= Craig (surname) =

Craig is a topographic surname of Scottish and English origin, derived from a Scots word for a steep or precipitous rock (cf. standard English "crag").

== People ==
- Albert Craig (disambiguation), multiple people
- Alfred M. Craig (1832–1911), American jurist
- Alisa Craig, a pen name of Charlotte MacLeod (1922–2005)
- Allan Craig (footballer) (1904–1984), Scottish footballer
- Allen Craig (born 1984), American Major League baseball player
- Amanda Craig (born 1959), British author
- Angie Craig (born 1972), American politician
- Ann Craig, English silversmith
- Annie Burgin Craig (1873–1955), American political hostess
- Annie Walker Craig, Scottish suffragette and political activist
- Arthur Craig aka AD (Bud) Craig Jr. (1951–2023), American neuroanatomist and neuroscientist
- Carl Craig (politician) (1878–1957), American politician
- Caroline Craig (born 1975), Australian actress
- Charity Rusk Craig (1849–1913), American organizational leader
- Charles Craig (disambiguation), multiple people
- Charles C. Craig (1865–1944), American jurist and legislator
- Charles L. Craig (1872–1935), American New York City Comptroller
- Charlotte Craig (born 1991), American Taekwondo practitioner
- Cola Barr Craig (1861–1930), American author and clubwoman
- Daniel Craig (born 1968), English actor
- Daniel F. Craig (1875–1929), American military officer
- David Craig (author), pseudonymous British author publishing in 2005
- Edward Gordon Craig (1872–1966), English theatre practitioner
- Elijah Craig (died 1808), American preacher
- Elizabeth Craig (writer) (1883–1980), British chef
- Elizabeth Craig, New Zealand politician
- Elizabeth A. Craig, American biochemist and geneticist
- Sir Ernest Craig, 1st Baronet (1859–1933), British Conservative Party politician
- Frank Barrington Craig (1902–1951), British artist
- Fred Craig (footballer) (1891–1966), played for Plymouth Argyle
- F. W. S. Craig (1929–1989), Scottish politician
- Gordon A. Craig (1913–2005), Scottish-American historian
- Harmon Craig (1926–2003), American geochemist
- Hector Craig (1775–1842), Congressman from New York
- Irwin Craig (died 1970), American juror
- James Craig (disambiguation), multiple people
- Janric Craig, 3rd Viscount Craigavon (1944–2025), British peer and chartered accountant
- Jecca Craig, British environmental conservationist
- Jennifer Craig, professor of ophthalmology
- Jenny Craig (born 1932), American entrepreneur
- Joe Craig (disambiguation), multiple people
- John Craig (disambiguation), multiple people
- John Manson Craig (1896–1970), Scottish soldier
- Judy Craig (born 1944), American singer
- Larry Craig (born 1945), American politician
- Locke Craig (1860–1925), American politician
- Lyman C. Craig (1906–1974), American chemist
- Malin Craig (1875–1945), American general
- Mary Lynde Craig (1834–1921), American writer, teacher, attorney, activist
- Meredith Craig, American politician
- Michael Craig (disambiguation), multiple people
- Neil Craig (born 1956), Australian rules footballer and coach
- Paco Craig (born 1965), American football player
- Paco Craig (born 1992), English footballer
- Paul Craig (born 1987), Scottish MMA Fighter
- Philip Craig (disambiguation), multiple people
- Ralph Craig (1889–1972), American track and field athlete
- Richard Craig (disambiguation), multiple people
- Robert Craig (disambiguation), multiple people
- Rod Craig (1958–2013), American baseball player
- Roger Craig (American football) (born 1960), American football player
- Roger Craig (baseball) (1930–2023), American baseball player
- Ryan Craig (born 1982), Canadian ice hockey player
- Ryan Craig (playwright) (born 1972), British playwright
- Shay Craig, American bishop
- Stephen Craig (bobsleigh) (born 1967), Australian bobsledder
- Steven Craig (born 1981), Scottish footballer
- Tommy Craig, (born 1950), Scottish footballer
- Thomas Craig (actor) (born 1962), English actor
- Thomas Craig (poet) (c. 1538 – 1608), Scottish jurist and poet
- Thomas Dixon Craig (1842–1905), Canadian politician
- Tully Craig (1895–1963), Scottish footballer and manager
- Walter H. Craig (1880–1937), American politician
- Wendy Craig (born 1934), English actress
- William Craig (disambiguation), multiple people
- Winchell McKendree Craig (1892–1960), American neurosurgeon
- Winston Craig (born 1995), American football player
- Yvonne Craig (1937–2015), American actress

== Fictional characters ==
- Brett Craig, from the television series Kath and Kim
- Harriet Craig, main character of the film Harriet Craig starring Joan Crawford
- John Craig (fictional agent), hero of spy thrillers by James Munro
- Kim Craig, from the television series Kath and Kim
- Kyle Craig, an antagonist in James Patterson's series of novels featuring detective Alex Cross
- Dr. Mark Craig, from the television series St. Elsewhere

== See also ==
- General Craig (disambiguation)
- Governor Craig (disambiguation)
- Justice Craig (disambiguation)
- Senator Craig (disambiguation)
- Craig (given name)
