= James Craig =

James or Jim Craig may refer to:

== Entertainment ==
- James Humbert Craig (1877–1944), Irish painter
- James Craig (actor) (1912–1985), American actor
- James Craig (General Hospital), fictional character on television, a.k.a. Jerry Jacks
- Jim Craig (One Life to Live), on television
- Jim Craig (The Man from Snowy River), fictional character in film

== Politics ==
=== U.K. ===
- James Henry Craig (1748–1812), British military officer and Canadian governor
- James Craig (MP for Carrickfergus) (1759–1833), British politician
- James Craig (MP for Newcastle) (1834–1902), British politician
- James Craig (physician) (1861–1933), Irish professor of medicine and independent politician
- James Craig, 1st Viscount Craigavon (1871–1940), first Prime Minister of Northern Ireland
- James Craig, 2nd Viscount Craigavon (1906–1974), British politician, son of prime minister
- James Craig (diplomat) (1924–2017), British ambassador, lecturer, writer
- James Craig (County Antrim, 20th century) (1931–1974), Northern Ireland politician

=== Elsewhere ===
- James Craig (Missouri soldier) (1818–1888), American politician and soldier
- James Craig (Canadian politician) (1823–1874), farmer and politician in Ontario
- James J. Craig (1853–1929), educator and politician in Ontario
- James Craig (Australian politician) (1911–1989), Australian politician

== Sports ==
- James B. Craig (1893–1990), American football player and coach
- Jim Craig (rugby league) (1895–1959), Australian rugby league footballer and coach
- Jim Craig (Australian footballer) (1900–1978), Australian rules footballer
- Jim Craig (Scottish footballer) (born 1943), fullback
- Jim Craig (ice hockey) (born 1957), American hockey player
- James Craig (rugby union, born 1977), Scottish rugby player, son of footballer Jim Craig
- James Craig (rugby union, born 1988), English rugby union player
- Jim Craig (bowls), Northern Irish lawn bowler

== Other ==
- James Craig (architect) (1739–1795), Scottish architect
- James Craig (loyalist) (1941–1988), Ulster loyalist paramilitary
- James Craig (police chief) (born 1956), American police chief and politician, formerly chief of the police departments of Detroit, Cincinnati, and Portland (Maine)
- James Craig (VC) (1824–1861), British soldier
- James Ireland Craig (1868–1952), Scottish mathematician and meteorologist
- James Craig (barque), three-mast sailing ship
- USS James E. Craig, American destroyer escort launched in 1943, named for U.S. Navy officer James Edwin Craig
- Sir James Henry Craig (ship)
- James Thomson Gibson-Craig (1799–1886), Scottish book collector
- Sir James Gibson-Craig (1765–1850), 1st Baronet Gibson-Craig
- Sir James Henry Gibson-Craig (1841–1908), 3rd Baronet Gibson-Craig
- James Craig, an accessory to murder involving followers of Charles Manson
- James Craig, pen name of Roy J. Snell

== See also ==
- Craig (surname)
- Craig James (disambiguation)
