= James Gibson-Craig =

James Gibson-Craig may refer to:

- Sir James Gibson-Craig, 1st Baronet (1765–1850), Scottish lawyer and government official
- James Thomson Gibson-Craig (1799–1886), his son, antiquary and bibliophile
