= Sir James Henry Craig (ship) =

At least two vessels have been named Sir James Henry Craig for General Sir James Henry Craig:

- Sir James Henry Craig (1811 ship) was launched at Sorel, Quebec. She sailed to England and made three voyages as a West Indiaman. In 1817 she sailed from England for India but was condemned at Calcutta in November after she sustained extensive storm-damage shortly after the start of her homeward-bound voyage.
- Sir James Henry Craig (1811 Quebec City ship) was built in Quebec and sailed to England. She spent her career primarily sailing between Canada and England. She was last listed in Lloyd's Register in 1831.
