= General Craig =

General Craig may refer to:

- Daniel Frank Craig (1875–1929), U.S. Army brigadier general
- Edward A. Craig (1896–1994), U.S. Marine Corps lieutenant general
- James Craig (Missouri soldier) (1818–1888), Union Army brigadier general of volunteers
- James Henry Craig (1748–1812), British Army general
- Malin Craig (1875–1945), U.S. Army general

== See also ==
- Christopher Craige (fl. 1990s–2020s), U.S. Air Force major general
