= 82nd Airborne Division Artillery =

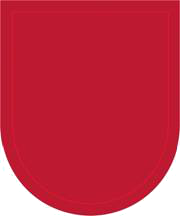
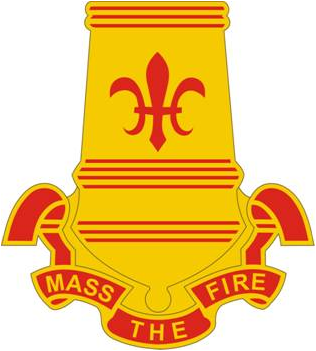
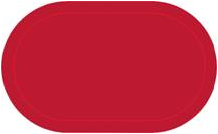
- Distinctive unit insignia
- Active: 1917–2006, 2014–present
- Country: United States
- Branch: United States Army
- Type: Field artillery
- Role: Division force fires HQ
- Size: Brigade
- Part of: 82nd Airborne Division
- Garrison/HQ: Fort Bragg, NC
- Motto: "Mass The Fire"
- Equipment: M119A3 Howitzer; M777A2 Howitzer
- Engagements: World War I World War II; Operation Power Pack/Dominican Republic; Operation Urgent Fury/Grenada; Operations Desert Shield & Desert Storm; Operation Enduring Freedom, Afghanistan; Operation Iraqi Freedom
- Website: www.bragg.army.mil/82nd/DivArty/Pages/default.aspx

Commanders
- Current commander: Colonel Michael Garry
- Command Sergeant Major: CSM Gregory Seymour
- Notable commanders: General Maxwell Taylor; General Maxwell Thurman; General Carl Vuono; Lieutenant General Joseph Swing; Major General Jay Hood

The 82nd Airborne Division Artillery (DIVARTY) is the divisional artillery command for the 82nd Airborne Division of the United States Army, stationed at Fort Bragg, North Carolina. It was organized in 1917, during World War I, was inactivated in 2006 as part of the transformation to modular brigade combat teams, and was reactivated in 2014.

== History ==
=== World War I ===
The 157th Field Artillery Brigade was organized at Camp Gordon, Georgia, in September 1917, five months after the American entry into World War I. The initial commander was Colonel Earle Pearce. Originally composed of two direct-support 3-in/75mm regiments (320th and 321st) with a total of 48 guns in 12 firing batteries, a general support regiment (319th) with 24 6-inch/155 mm howitzers in 6 firing batteries, and a trench mortar battery with twelve 6-in mortars. The brigade trained on limited U.S. made pieces before deploying to Europe. On 20 February 1918, Brigadier General Charles D. Rhodes assumed command of the brigade, which sailed for Europe on 19 May 1918, arriving in Southampton, England on 31 May 1918, then moved to Le Havre, France, on 3 June 1918. On 4 June 1918, the brigade moved to La Courtine, France, for training. On 19 August 1918, the brigade moved to the Marbache sector in Lorraine, rejoined the 82nd Division and assumed command of the sector artillery on 22 August 1918. From 12–16 September, the brigade supported the St Mihiel offensive. After the St Mihiel operation stabilized on 17 September, the brigade moved to the rear with the division, serving in First Army reserve from 26 September to 2 October. On 3 October 1918, the brigade assembled with the division near Varennes-en-Argonne before re-entering the line. From 6–31 October 1918, the brigade supported the division during the Meuse-Argonne Offensive. On 25 October 1918, Brigadier General Rhodes (promoted on 14 October to major general) departed, leaving Colonel Pearce in command. On 31 October 1918, the division was relieved and the brigade remained in support of the 80th Division until 6 November, before concentrating near Les Islettes on 10 November. On 3 November 1918, Brigadier General Daniel F. Craig assumed command from Colonel Pearce. The brigade trained in the Les Islettes Area (until 17 November) and then in the Ste-Menehould Area before rejoining the 82nd Division in Prauthoy on 17 December. On 9 February 1919, the 307th Trench Mortar Battery sailed from Brest for the United States, with the rest of the brigade following in May from Bordeaux. The brigade was demobilized at Camp Upton, NY, on 23 May 1919.

=== Interwar ===
The 157th Field Artillery Brigade was constituted in the Organized Reserve on 24 June 1921, and assigned to the 82nd Division in the 4th Corps Area. From 14 January 1922 until 8 July 1927, the brigade was stationed in Columbia, SC; it then relocated to Spartanburg, SC. The brigade consisted of two 75 mm gun regiments (the 319th and 320th Field Artillery regiments) and the 307th Ammunition Train. In 1929, a 155 mm howitzer regiment (the 452d Field Artillery) was added to the brigade when the Army adopted a lighter 155 mm howitzer. This regiment was redesignated as the 321st Field Artillery in 1929, and remained with the brigade until 1941. The brigade often conducted summer training with the 13th Field Artillery Brigade, a Regular Army brigade stationed at Fort Bragg, NC.

=== World War II ===
Recalled into active service on 25 March 1942, over three months after the United States entered World War II, at Camp Claiborne, Louisiana, the Division Artillery, under the command of then-Brigadier General Joseph Swing, consisted of four field artillery battalions: the 319th, 320th, 321st, and 907th. On 15 August 1942, the 82nd Infantry Division was reorganized as the 82nd Airborne Division and transferred the 321st and 907th Field Artillery Battalions to the 101st Airborne Division. The 319th and 320th Field Artillery Battalions were re-organized as Glider Field Artillery Battalions (GFAB), and a new battalion, the 376th Parachute Field Artillery Battalion (PFAB) was assigned. On 3 September 1942, the 80th Airborne Anti-Aircraft Battalion was activated. After moving from Camp Claiborne to Fort Bragg, North Carolina, in October 1942, a second parachute battalion, the 456th PFAB, was assigned to the division on 12 February 1943, when the division replaced the 326th Glider Infantry Regiment with the 505th Parachute Infantry Regiment. On 12 December 1942, Brigadier General Swing departed to take command of the 11th Airborne Division, succeeded by newly promoted Brigadier General Maxwell Taylor, who had been the division's chief of staff.

The DIVARTY sailed from New York with the division in April 1943, and landed at Casablanca, Morocco in May. After marshalling at Camp Don B. Passage near Casablanca, the division moved forward, with the 320th GFAB and 80th Airborne Anti-Aircraft bivouacking with the 325th Glider Infantry Regimental Combat Team near Marnia, Algeria, while the rest of the division settled near the airport at Oudja, French Morocco. In late June 1943, the division stages forward into its takeoff fields for Operation Husky, around Kairouan, Tunisia.

==== Sicily ====
On the evening of 9 July 1943 (D-1), the 456th PFAB under the command of Lieutenant Colonel Harrison Harden, departed Tunisia to conduct Operation Husky as part of the 505th Parachute Infantry Regimental Combat Team. After landing, 45 men led by 1st Lieutenant Willis from Battery C joined the 180th Infantry Regiment of the 45th Infantry Division, while 60 others, including three guns from the 456th, participated in capturing the town of Vittoria. Another 3 guns from the 456th were part of the defense of Biazza Ridge. During this fighting on 10 July (D-day), a machine gun crew from Battery D, 456th PFAB destroyed three enemy aircraft.

On 11 July (D+1), the 376th PFAB, under the command of Lieutenant Colonel Wilbur Griffith, followed as part of the 504th Parachute Regimental Combat Team. the 504th Combat Team's drop was attacked by friendly fire from U.S. Army and Navy anti-aircraft guns, destroying 23 of its 144 planes, including four that carried 33 paratroopers from Battery C, 376th; 10 of the 33 survived. On 16 July, the remaining elements of the DIVARTY moved to Sicily on gliders, landing safely at around 15:15.

=== Cold War ===
From 1948 to 1957, the Division Artillery consisted of Headquarters and Headquarters Battery; a medical detachment; a 155 mm towed howitzer battalion, the 98th Airborne Field Artillery Battalion; three 105 mm towed howitzer battalions, the 319th, 376th and 456th Airborne Field Artillery Battalions; and the 80th Airborne Anti-Aircraft Battalion. Each battalion consisted of a headquarters and headquarters battery, three firing batteries, and the howitzer battalions also had a service battery. The Division Artillery could field 36 (later 54) 105 mm howitzers (12/18 per battalion), 12/18 155 mm howitzers, 24 40 mm anti-aircraft guns and 24 .50-caliber machine guns.

Effective 1 September 1957, the Division Artillery reorganized under the pentomic or Reorganization of the Airborne Division (ROTAD) organization. To support each of the five new battle groups in the division, the division artillery had a separate batteries of five 105 mm howitzers that reported directly to the division artillery without intermediate battalions. The division artillery's five 105 mm howitzer batteries were designated as Batteries A, B and C of the 319th Artillery and Batteries D and E of the 320th Artillery. When Battery C, 319th Artillery accompanied the 2nd Airborne Battle Group, 503rd Infantry to Okinawa in 1960, Battery C, 320th Artillery was activated to replace it in the Division Artillery. To provide general support and nuclear fires, Battery B, 377th Artillery manned four Honest John (later Little John) rocket launchers. The pentomic Division Artillery, with only 25 105 mm howitzers, was a significant reduction in combat power. Partly due to this lack of firepower, the pentomic organization lasted only until 1964.

The 82nd Airborne Division Artillery implemented the Reorganization Objective Army Division (ROAD) on 25 May 1964. Under this organization, the DVIARTY consisted of the HHB, a Little John rocket battery (B/377 FA), and three 105mm direct support battalions: 1st Battalion (Airborne), 319th Field Artillery; 1st Battalion (Airborne), 320th Field Artillery; and the 2nd Battalion (Airborne), 321st Field Artillery.

Beginning on 30 April 1965, the Division Artillery deployed to the Dominican Republic with the 82d Airborne Division in 1965, but strict rules of engagement limited the employment of artillery. Except for 1 battery from 1-320 FA, the DIVARTY was redeployed by the end of May. The remaining battery redeployed on 28 June 1966.

Following the Tet Offensive in February 1968, the Division Artillery dispatched 2-321 with the 3d Brigade to Vietnam- the battalion deployed by battery with the brigade's infantry battalions from 16–27 February 1968. The 2-321 supported the Golden Brigade's operations in Vietnam for over 18 months, redeploying in October and November 1969. During the deployment of 2-321, the Division Artillery created an additional battalion, 3rd Battalion (Airborne), 320th Field Artillery, to support a provisional 4th Brigade formed by the division. Neither 3-320 nor 4th Brigade ever achieved full strength or operational readiness, and 3-320 inactivated on 15 December 1969.

=== Post Cold War ===
under construction

=== Global War on Terror ===
In September 2003, the Division Artillery returned to Iraq. Operating from Camp Champion Main in Ar Ramadi, the Division Artillery conducted captured enemy ammunition operations, consolidating and destroying nearly 50,000 short tons of ammunition and consolidating 92 unsecured storage areas into 4 secured storage areas. The Division Artillery was also base camp mayor for Camp Champion Main. The Division Artillery returned to Fort Bragg in March 2004.

As part of the 82d Airborne Division's response to Hurricane Katrina, the Division Artillery established an interagency operations cell at Louis Armstrong International Airport, bringing together more than 25 organizations.

As part of the Army's transformation to modularity, the Division Artillery was inactivated in January 2006, and its assets used to form the core of the new 4th Brigade Combat Team.

On 16 October 2014, the 82d Airborne Division Artillery was reactivated at Fort Bragg, North Carolina. The unit's current mission is to plan, synchronize and employ joint and combined fires in support of forced entry operations, designated division or CJTF HQ; on order integrate attached ground and air maneuver forces in order to conduct full-spectrum operations.

== Lineage and honors ==
=== Lineage ===
- Constituted 5 August 1917 in the National Army as Headquarters, 157th Field Artillery Brigade, and assigned to the 82d Division
- Organized in September 1917 at Camp Gordon, Georgia
- Demobilized 23 May 1919 at Camp Upton, New York
- Reconstituted 24 June 1921 in the Organized Reserves and assigned to the 82d Division
- Organized in January 1922 in the Fourth Corps Area
- Redesignated 13 February 1942 as Headquarters and Headquarters Battery, 82d Division Artillery
- Ordered into active military service 25 March 1942 and reorganized at Camp Clairborne, Louisiana
- Reorganized and redesignated 15 August 1942 as Headquarters and Headquarters Battery, 82d Airborne Division Artillery

(Organized Reserves redesignated 25 March 1948 as the Organized Reserve Corps)

- Withdrawn 15 November 1948 from the Organized Reserve Corps and allotted to the Regular Army
- Inactivated 15 June 2006 at Fort Bragg, North Carolina
- Activated 16 October 2014 at Fort Bragg, North Carolina

=== Campaign participation credit ===
- World War I: St. Mihiel; Meuse-Argonne; Lorraine 1918
- World War II: Sicily; Naples-Foggia; Normandy (with arrowhead); Rhineland (with arrowhead); Ardennes-Alsace; Central Europe
- Armed Forces Expeditions: Dominican Republic; Grenada
- Southwest Asia: Defense of Saudi Arabia; Liberation and Defense of Kuwait
- War on Terrorism: Campaigns to be determined
  - Iraq: Liberation of Iraq, Transition of Iraq

Note: the official Army lineage, published 15 February 2015, lists "Campaigns to be determined". Estimate that the unit will be entitled to campaign credit for two campaigns based on deployment dates.

=== Decorations ===
- Presidential Unit Citation (Army), Streamer embroidered STE. MERE EGLISE
- Meritorious Unit Commendation (Army), Streamer embroidered SOUTHWEST ASIA 1990–1991
- French Croix de Guerre with Palm, World War II, Streamer embroidered STE. MERE EGLISE
- French Croix de Guerre with Palm, World War II, Streamer embroidered COTENTIN
- French Croix de Guerre, World War II, Fourragere
- Military Order of William (Degree of the Knight of the Fourth Class) for NIJMEGEN 1944
- Netherlands Orange Lanyard
- Belgian Fourragere 1940
  - Cited in the Order of the Day of the Belgian Army for action in the Ardennes
  - Cited in the Order of the Day of the Belgian Army for action in Belgium and Germany

== Heraldry ==
=== Distinctive unit insignia ===
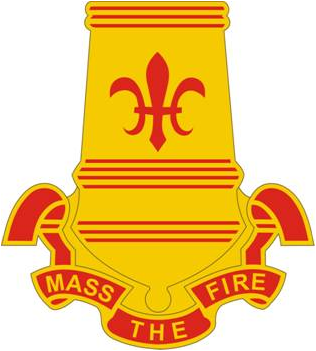

==== Description/blazon ====
A gold color metal and enamel device 1 5/32 inches (2.94 cm) in height consisting of a gold Revolutionary cannon palewise, a red fleur-de-lis; around the base a red scroll with the motto "MASS THE FIRE" in gold letters.

==== Symbolism ====
Scarlet and yellow are used for Artillery. The representation of the Revolutionary War period cannon is symbolic of the functions of the Battery and the red fleur-de-lis is representative of the battle honors earned in France during World War I.

==== Background ====
The distinctive unit insignia was originally approved for the Headquarters and Headquarters Battery, 82d Division Artillery on 12 October 1942. It was redesignated for the Headquarters and Headquarters Battery, 82nd Airborne Division Artillery and amended to change the wording of the description and symbolism on 14 January 1966.

=== Beret flash ===
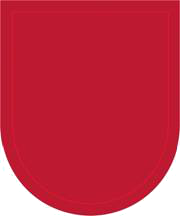

==== Description/blazon ====
A red shield-shaped embroidered item with a semi-circular base, 2 1/4 inches (5.72 cm) in height and 1 7/8 inches (4.76 cm) in width overall, edged with a 1/8 inch (.32 cm) red border. The beret flash was originally approved for the 82d Airborne Division Artillery on 17 June 1986. It was redesignated for the 2d Battalion, 321st Field Artillery Regiment on 18 May 2007. It was redesignated for the 82d Airborne Division Artillery effective 16 October 2014.

=== Background trimming ===
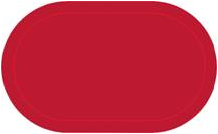

==== Description/blazon ====
A red oval-shaped embroidered item 1 3/8 inches (3.49 cm) in height and 2 1/4 inches (5.72 cm) in width overall, edged with a 1/8 inch (.32 cm) red border. The background trimming was originally approved for the 82d Airborne Division Artillery on 17 June 1986. It was redesignated for the 2d Battalion, 321st Field Artillery Regiment on 18 May 2007. It was redesignated for the 82d Airborne Division Artillery effective 16 October 2014.

== See also ==
319th Field Artillery Regiment

320th Field Artillery Regiment

321st Field Artillery Regiment

377th Field Artillery Regiment
