= John Wilde =

John Wilde or Wylde may refer to:

- John Wilde (jurist) (or Wylde; 1590–1669), English lawyer and politician
- John Wylde (lawyer) (or Wild; c. 1760–1840), Scottish lawyer and academic
- Sir John Wylde (or Wilde; 1781–1859), Chief Justice of the Cape Colony
- John Wilde (artist) (1919–2006), American painter

== See also ==
- John Wild (disambiguation)
