= John Wild =

John Wild may refer to:

- Jack Wild (1952–2006), English actor
- John Benton Wild (1806–1857), Australian politician
- John Caspar Wild (1804–1846), American painter
- John Daniel Wild (1902–1972), American philosopher
- John J. Wild (1914–2009), developer of ultrasound in cancer diagnosis
- Paul Wild (Australian scientist) (John Paul Wild, born 1923), Australian radio astronomer
- Frank Wild (John Wild, 1873–1939), Antarctic explorer
- Jonathan Wild (1682–1725), London criminal
- John Wild (priest) (1904–1992), English dean and college head
- John Wild (runner) (born 1953), English cross country and fell runner
- John Wild (cricketer) (born 1935), English cricketer
- John James Wild (1824–1900), Swiss linguist, oceanographer and natural history illustrator and lithographer
- John Wild (judge), judge at the Court of Appeal of New Zealand (2011–2017)

== See also ==
- John Wilde (disambiguation)
