= Justice Craig =

Justice Craig may refer to:

- Alfred M. Craig (1832–1911), associate justice of the Supreme Court of Illinois
- Charles C. Craig (1865–1944), associate justice of the Supreme Court of Illinois
