= James E. Craig =

James E. Craig could refer to:

- James Craig (police chief) (born 1956), American police official
- USS James E. Craig (DE-201), American destroyer escort launched in 1943, named for U.S. Navy officer James Edwin Craig

== See also ==
- James Craig (disambiguation)
