= Robert Craig =

Robert, Rob, Bob or Bobby Craig may refer to:

== Sportspeople ==
- Bob Craig (Scottish footballer) (1886–1918), Scottish footballer
- Bob Craig (rugby) (1881–1935), Australian rugby player and Olympic gold medalist
- Bobby Craig (footballer, born 1935) (1935–2010), Scottish footballer
- Bobby Craig (footballer, born 1928) (1928–2016), English footballer
- Bobby Craig (Australian footballer) (1882–?), Australian rules footballer

== Academics ==
- Robert T. Craig (born 1947), communication scholar
- Robert C. Craig (1921–1990), academic who taught at the Michigan State University
- Robert Craig (theologian) (1917–1995), academic and church leader
- Robert Meldrum Craig (1882–1956), geologist and academic author

== Others ==
- Robert Craig of Riccarton (1730–1823), Scottish lawyer, landowner and political writer
- Robert Craig (representative) (1792–1852), U.S. representative from Virginia
- Robert Hunter Craig (1829–1913), British member of parliament for Glasgow Govan, 1900–1906
- Robert Craig (Medal of Honor) (1919–1943), Scottish-born U.S. Army officer awarded the Medal of Honor for his service on Sicily
  - USNS Lt. Robert Craig
- Robert Craig (Illinois politician) (1921–2000), member of the Illinois House of Representatives

== See also ==
- Craig (surname)
