= Jay W. Hood =

United States Army general

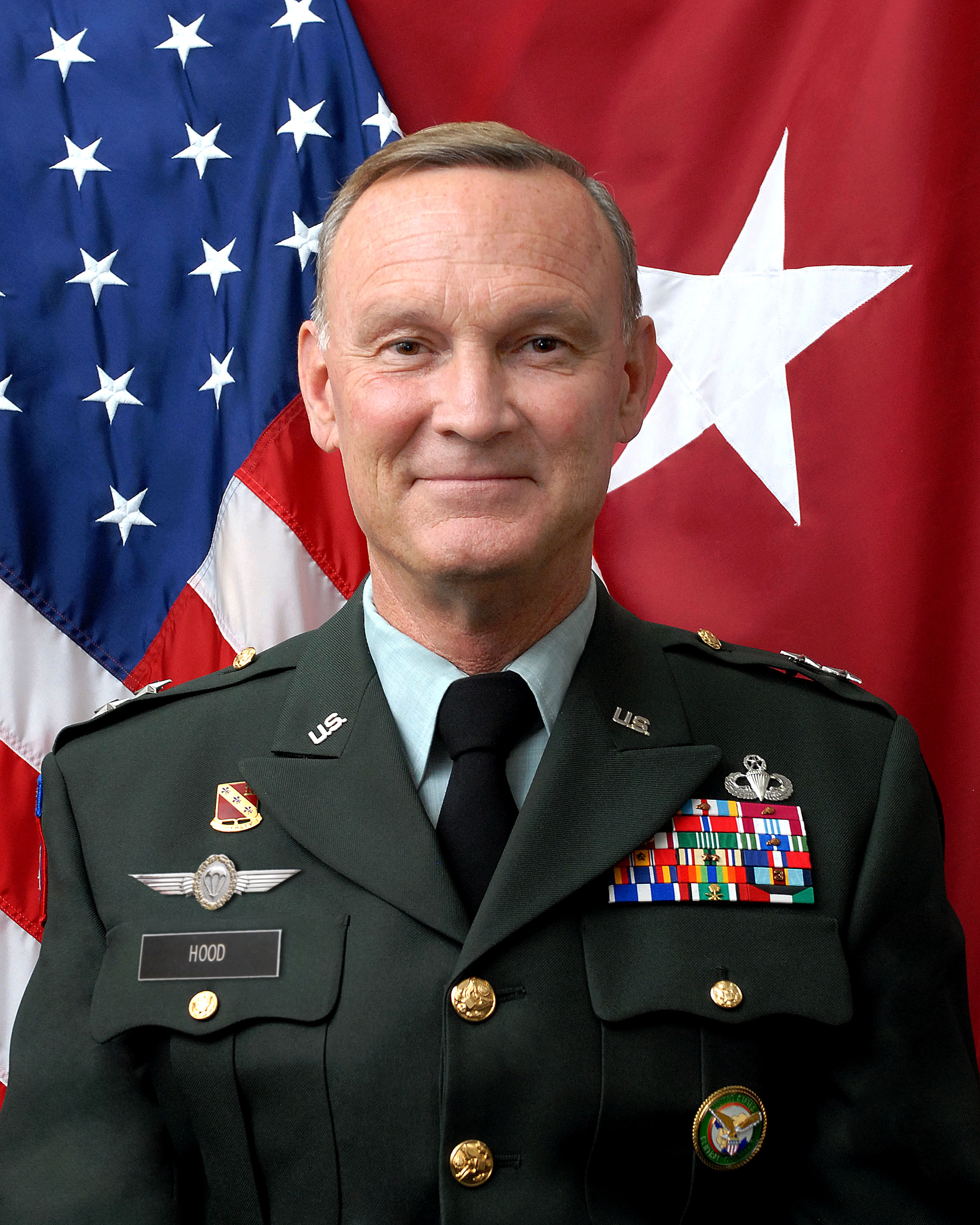
- Military career
- Allegiance: United States
- Branch: United States Army
- Service years: 1975–2010
- Rank: Major General
- Commands: First Army Division East; Joint Task Force Guantanamo; 82nd Airborne Division Artillery; 3rd Battalion, 319th Field Artillery Regiment
- Conflicts: Gulf War
- Awards: Defense Superior Service Medal (2); Legion of Merit (2); Bronze Star Medal

Jay W. Hood is a retired United States Army major general. His final assignment was as Chief Of Staff of the United States Central Command. His previous assignments include Commander of First Army Division East, Fort George G. Meade, Maryland; Commanding General of Joint Task Force Guantanamo (JTF-GTMO), Guantanamo Bay, Cuba; Assistant Division Commander (Forward), 24th Infantry Division and Deputy Commanding General (South), First Army, Fort Gillem, Georgia; Commander, 82nd Airborne Division Artillery and Commander, 3rd Battalion, 319th Field Artillery Regiment, 82nd Airborne, Fort Bragg, North Carolina; Commander, Battery D, 4th Battalion (Airborne), 325th Infantry (Battalion Combat Team), U.S. Army Southern European Task Force; and Commander, Battery A, 2nd Battalion, 321st Field Artillery Regiment, 82nd Airborne Division, Fort Bragg, North Carolina. General Hood is a graduate of Pittsburg (KS) State University

== Command of Joint Task Force Guantanamo ==
In November 2004, Hood became commander of the Joint Task Force Guantanamo, operator of the temporary detention facility at Camp X-Ray. The International Committee of the Red Cross released a confidential report to the United States government saying that the American military had intentionally used psychological and sometimes physical coercion "tantamount to torture" on prisoners at Guantanamo Bay. In response, Hood said, "I'm satisfied that the detainees here have not been abused, they've not been mistreated, they've not been tortured in any way."

In May 2005, Hood released a report of investigation headed by him, announcing five cases in which the Koran was mishandled at the prison.

Hood has come under criticism for his decision to force feed detainees with the use of a restraining chair. Hood defended the decision, saying he would not allow one of the detainees to become a martyr, thereby creating more pressure to close the camp.

"Imagine, if you will, if we simply allowed them, contrary to U.S. law, to kill themselves," Hood said. "What would that mean to the rest of the Islamic world? You have Muslim men dying at Guantanamo Bay."
