= List of shipwrecks in December 1829 =

The list of shipwrecks in December 1829 includes some ships sunk, wrecked or otherwise lost during December 1829.

== 1 December ==
List of shipwrecks: 1 December 1829
Ship	State	Description
Bardon	United Kingdom	The ship was abandoned in the Atlantic Ocean (49°00′N 9°00′W). Her crew were rescued by Bolivar (United Kingdom). Bardon was on a voyage from Quebec City, Lower Canada, British North America, to London.
John Adams	United States	The brig was wrecked on a reef north west of Barbuda. She was on a voyage from Antwerp, Netherlands to St. Jago de Cuba, Cuba.
Jong Claas	Kingdom of Hanover	The ship was wrecked on Borkum. She was on a voyage from Hull, Yorkshire, United Kingdom to Emden.
Leeuw	Netherlands	The ship was driven ashore and wrecked near Ingoldmells, Lincolnshire, United Kingdom.
Margarita	Netherlands	The ship was driven ashore crewless and wrecked at Flamborough Head, Yorkshire, United Kingdom.
Osmond	United Kingdom	The ship ran aground on the Haisborough Sands, in the North Sea off the coast of Norfolk and sank. Her crew were rescued. She was on a voyage from Newcastle upon Tyne, Northumberland, to London.
Ossian	United Kingdom	The ship was wrecked near St. Lucar, Spain. She was on a voyage from Liverpool, Lancashire, to St. Lucar.
Reward	United Kingdom	The ship was driven ashore in Ardmore Bay with the loss of her captain.
Svyatoy Nikolay (Святой Николай, 'St. Nicholas')	Imperial Russian Navy	The ship exploded at Izmail with the loss of six lives.
Superb	United Kingdom	The ship was lost on the Haisborough Sands with the loss of a crew member. She was on a voyage from Saint Petersburgh, Russia, to Sunderland, County Durham.
Teignmouth	United Kingdom	The smack was driven ashore and wrecked at Wick, Caithness. Her crew were rescued.
Thomas and Martha	United Kingdom	The ship was run into by Shepherd (United Kingdom at Whitby, Yorkshire, and sank.

== 2 December ==
List of shipwrecks: 2 December 1829
Ship	State	Description
John & Elizabeth	United Kingdom	The ship was driven ashore and wrecked at Sunderland, County Durham. Her crew were rescued by the Sunderland Lifeboat.
Omond	United Kingdom	The ship was wrecked on the Haisborough Sands, in the North Sea off the coast of Norfolk. Her crew were rescued. She was on a voyage from North Shields, County Durham, to London.
William	United States	The ship was wrecked on Bermuda. All on board were rescued. She was on a voyage from New York to Bermuda.

== 3 December ==
List of shipwrecks: 3 December 1829
Ship	State	Description
Betsey	United Kingdom	The ship ran aground on the Haisborough Sands, in the North Sea off the coast of Norfolk and was abandoned. Her crew were rescued by Planter (United Kingdom. Betsey was on a voyage from London to Sunderland, County Durham.
Britannia	United Kingdom	The ship ran aground on the Haisborough Sands. She was refloated but consequently capsized off the Dudgeon Lightship ( Trinity House). Britannia was later taken in to Hull, Yorkshire. She was on a voyage from Saint Petersburg, Russia, to London.
Concord	United Kingdom	The ship was wrecked on the Black Middens, in the North Sea off South Shields, County Durham. Her crew were rescued. She was on a voyage from Sunderland to London.
Eleanor	United Kingdom	The sloop was run down and sunk off Staithes, Yorkshire, by a collier. All hands were lost.
James	United Kingdom	The ship was wrecked on the Black Middens. Her crew were rescued. She was on a voyage from Sunderland to Exeter, Devon.
Polybank	United Kingdom	The sloop was wrecked on the Runnel Stone, in the Atlantic Ocean off the coast of Cornwall Her four crew survived. She was on a voyage from Newport, Monmouthshire to Dartmouth, Devon.
Reward	United Kingdom	The ship was driven ashore and wrecked in Ardmore Bay. She was on a voyage from Newfoundland, British North America to Liverpool, Lancashire.
Sir James Kemp	United Kingdom	The ship was driven ashore in Dundrum Bay. Her crew were rescued. She was on a voyage from Saint John, New Brunswick, British North America, to Liverpool.
HMS Success	Royal Navy	HMS Success under repair in the Swan River. The Atholl-class corvette ran aground on the Carnac Reef in the Swan River and was damaged. She was later repaired and returned to service.
William Harvey	United Kingdom	The ship was driven ashore at Savannah, Georgia, United States. She was on a voyage from Liverpool to savannah.
Wortley	United Kingdom	The ship was driven ashore in the Humber.

== 4 December ==
List of shipwrecks: 4 December 1829
Ship	State	Description
Aid	United Kingdom	The ship was wrecked on the Cross Sand, in the North Sea off the coast of Norfolk. Her crew survived.
Economy	United Kingdom	The ship was wrecked on the Black Middens, in the North Sea off Tynemouth, Northumberland.
Oak	United Kingdom	The ship was driven ashore at Gorleston, Suffolk.
Sir James Henry Craig	United Kingdom	The ship was lost.

== 5 December ==
List of shipwrecks: 5 December 1829
Ship	State	Description
Cornelia	France	The ship was wrecked on Belle Île, Morbihan. She was on a voyage from Cap-Haitien, Haiti to Nantes, Loire-Inférieure.
Delight	United Kingdom	The ship was run down off The Skerries, County Antrim, and was abandoned by her crew. She was on a voyage from Dundalk, County Louth, to Preston, Lancashire.
Economy	United Kingdom	The ship ran aground on the Black Middens, in the North Sea off South Shields, County Durham.
Phœnix	United Kingdom	The ship was driven ashore on North Uist, Outer Hebrides. She was on a voyage from Ballyshannon, County Donegal, to Liverpool, Lancashire.
Theodore	United Kingdom	The ship was driven ashore on North Uist. She was on a voyage from Westport, County Mayo, to Liverpool.
William and Agnes	United Kingdom	The ship foundered off "Magie Island". She was on a voyage from Sligo to Bristol, Gloucestershire.

== 6 December ==
List of shipwrecks: 6 December 1829
Ship	State	Description
Rover	United Kingdom	The brig struck a rock and foundered in the Atlantic Ocean 15 nautical miles (28 km) off the coast of Ceará, Brazil with the loss of five of her eight crew.

== 7 December ==
List of shipwrecks: 7 December 1829
Ship	State	Description
Sarah	United Kingdom	The ship was driven ashore at Liverpool, Lancashire.
Syren	United Kingdom	The ship was driven ashore at Robin Hoods Bay, Yorkshire.

== 9 December ==
List of shipwrecks: 9 December 1829
Ship	State	Description
Delight	United Kingdom	The ship was driven ashore crewless at Douglas, Isle of Man. She was on a voyage from Dundalk, County Louth, to Preston, Lancashire.
Idas	United Kingdom	The brigantine was driven ashore near the Mumbles Lighthouse, Glamorgan. Her crew were rescued. She was on a voyage from Miramichi, New Brunswick, British North America, to Gloucester. Idas subsequently became a wreck.

== 10 December ==
List of shipwrecks: 10 December 1829
Ship	State	Description
Favourite	United Kingdom	The ship was driven ashore at Maryport, Cumberland. She was on a voyage from Dublin to Workington, Cumberland.
General Bolivar	Mexico	The ship was wrecked at Veracruz.
Minerva	United Kingdom	The ship sank at Limerick. She was on a voyage from Limerick to Glasgow, Renfrewshire.
Pioneer	United Kingdom	The ship was driven ashore near Liverpool, Lancashire, and was wrecked. She was on a voyage from Quebec City, Lower Canada, British North America, to Liverpool.

== 11 December ==
List of shipwrecks: 11 December 1829
Ship	State	Description
Bannockburn	United Kingdom	The ship was wrecked on the Long Sand, in the North Sea off the coast of Essex. Her crew were rescued. She was on a voyage from Saint Petersburg, Russia, to Newhaven, Sussex.
Eagle	United Kingdom	The ship was wrecked off Islay.
Esperance	France	The schooner foundered in the Irish Sea off Bardsey Island, Pembrokeshire, United Kingdom with the loss of all but two of her crew. She was on a voyage from "Mallard" to Liverpool, Lancashire, United Kingdom.
Nimrod	United Kingdom	The ship was driven ashore and wrecked on the Isle of Harris, Outer Hebrides. Her crew were rescued. She was on a voyage from Belfast to Charleston, South Carolina, United States.

== 12 December ==
List of shipwrecks: 12 December 1829
Ship	State	Description
Brothers	United Kingdom	The ship was driven ashore at Ravenglass, Cumberland. She was refloated on 2 January 1830 and taken in to Whitehaven, Cumberland.
Burdon	United Kingdom	The ship was driven ashore and wrecked on Share Island, County Waterford. She was on a voyage from Quebec City, Lower Canada, British North America, to London.
Delight	United Kingdom	The ship was run down and sunk off The Skerries, County Antrim, by a schooner. Her crew were rescued. She was on a voyage from Dundalk, County Louth, to Preston, Lancashire.
Eleanor	United Kingdom	The ship was driven ashore and wrecked near Castletown, Isle of Man. Her crew were rescued. She was on a voyage from Liverpool, Lancashire, to Buenos Aires, Argentina.
George	(United Kingdom of Great Britain and Ireland) British North America	The ship was wrecked at Canso, Nova Scotia, with the loss of four of her crew. She was on a voyage from Halifax to Canso.
Lowe	Hamburg	The galiot was driven ashore on Scharhörn. She was abandoned on 28 December. Lowe wason a voyage from Aberdeen, United Kingdom to Hamburg.

== 13 December ==
List of shipwrecks: 13 December 1829
Ship	State	Description
Prince Kirtersoff or Prince Kutusoff	United Kingdom	The brig was driven ashore and wrecked at Baltimore, County Cork. Her crew were rescued. She was on a voyage from Quebec City, Lower Canada, British North America, to Liverpool, Lancashire.

== 14 December ==
List of shipwrecks: 14 December 1829
Ship	State	Description
Dunbar Castle	United Kingdom	The ship foundered in the Baltic Sea off Dragør, Denmark with the loss of all hands. She was on a voyage from Danzig, Prussia, to London.

== 15 December ==
List of shipwrecks: 15 December 1829
Ship	State	Description
Esperance	France	The ship was wrecked on Bardsey Island, Caernarfonshire, United Kingdom with the loss of all but two of her crew. She was on a voyage from Milford Haven, Pembrokeshire, United Kingdom, to Liverpool, Lancashire, United Kingdom.
Favourite	United Kingdom	The ship was driven ashore and wrecked at Maryport, Cumberland. She was on a voyage from Dublin to Workington, Cumberland.
Gallego	UKGBI	The ship was wrecked at Faial, Azores, Portugal. She was on a voyage from Boston, Massachusetts, United States, to London.
Maria Wilhelmina	Danzig	The ship was wrecked on Skagen, Denmark. She was on a voyage from London, United Kingdom, to Danzig.
Nelson	United Kingdom	The ship was driven ashore near Bowness-on-Solway, Cumberland.

== 16 December ==
List of shipwrecks: 16 December 1829
Ship	State	Description
Nancy	United Kingdom	The ship was driven ashore near Therapia, Ottoman Empire.

== 17 December ==
List of shipwrecks: 17 December 1829
Ship	State	Description
Hampshire	United Kingdom	The ship sprang a leak and was beached at Helford, Cornwall. She was on a voyage from Cardiff, Glamorgan, to London.

== 18 December ==
List of shipwrecks: 18 December 1829
Ship	State	Description
Aleppo	(United Kingdom of Great Britain and Ireland) British North America	The ship was wrecked in the Caicos Islands. She was on a voyage from Halifax, Nova Scotia, to Kingston, Jamaica.
Bibby	United Kingdom	The ship was lost on the Kish Bank, in Liverpool Bay.
Carl Hermann	Hamburg	The ship foundered at the mouth of the Elbe. She was on a voyage from Cephalonia, Greece to Hamburg.
Despique	Spain	The ship was abandoned in the Atlantic Ocean off Cabo Espichel, Portugal. She was on a voyage from Madeira to St. Ubes.
Percy	United Kingdom	The ship was wrecked on the Whiting Sand, in the North Sea off the coast of Essex. Her crew were rescued. She was on a voyage from Newcastle upon Tyne, Northumberland, to London.
Star	United Kingdom	The ship was wrecked on West Caicos. Her crew were rescued. She was on a voyage from Jamaica to Dublin.

== 19 December ==
List of shipwrecks: 19 December 1829
Ship	State	Description
Dora	France	The ship was wrecked on the Lemon and Ore Sand, in the North Sea. She was on a voyage from Danzig, Prussia, to Le Havre, Seine-Inférieure.

== 21 December ==
List of shipwrecks: 21 December 1829
Ship	State	Description
HMS Pelorus	Royal Navy	The Cruizer-class brig-sloop ran aground on a rock at Mahón, Menorca, Spain. She was refloated two days later but subsequently sank. HMS Pelorus was later refloated, repaired and returned to service.

== 22 December ==
List of shipwrecks: 22 December 1829
Ship	State	Description
Ann or Avon	United Kingdom	The ship was wrecked on the Barebush Key. She was on a voyage from Bristol, Gloucestershire, to Savanna-la-Mar, Jamaica.
Craig Elachie	United Kingdom	The ship was wrecked on the Gunfleet Sand, in the North Sea off the coast of Essex with the loss of five of her seven crew. She was on a voyage from Belfast, County Antrim, to London.
Glora	Danzig	The ship was lost near Falmouth, Cornwall, United Kingdom. Her crew were rescued. She was on a voyage from Danzig to Le Havre, Seine-Inférieure, France.

== 23 December ==
List of shipwrecks: 23 December 1829
Ship	State	Description
Eliza	United Kingdom	The ship was driven ashore on the Levan Sands, Renfrewshire.
Hannah	United Kingdom	The ship ran aground in the River Stour at Sandwich, Kent, and was wrecked.

== 24 December ==
List of shipwrecks: 24 December 1829
Ship	State	Description
Denison	United Kingdom	The ship was driven ashore at Great Yarmouth, Norfolk. Her crew were rescued.
Rambaska	Norway	The ship ran aground on the Stoney Binks, in the North Sea off the mouth of the Humber. She was consequently beached at Grimsby, Lincolnshire, United Kingdom. She was on a voyage from Fredrikstad to London, United Kingdom.

== 25 December ==
List of shipwrecks: 25 December 1829
Ship	State	Description
Goliah	France	The ship was driven ashore near Barfleur, Manche. She was on a voyage from Charleston, South Carolina, to Le Havre, Seine-Inférieure. Goliah was later refloated and taken in to Saint-Vaast-la-Hougue, Manche.
Joseph	United Kingdom	The ship was driven ashore at Great Yarmouth, Norfolk. Her crew were rescued.
Poetess	United Kingdom	The ship was wrecked on a reef "to the windward of Great Hill". Her crew were rescued.
Thornton	United Kingdom	The ship ran aground on the Stoney Binks, in the North Sea off the mouth of the Humber. Her crew were rescued by the Humber Lifeboat. She was later taken in to Grimsby, Lincolnshire, in a waterlogged condition.

== 29 December ==
List of shipwrecks: 29 December 1829
Ship	State	Description
Helen	(United Kingdom of Great Britain and Ireland) Grenada	The sloop was wrecked at Culwiny Bay, Grenada. Her crew were rescued.

== 30 December ==
List of shipwrecks: 30 December 1829
Ship	State	Description
St. Johannes	Danzig	The ship was driven ashore and wrecked at Hunstanton, Norfolk, United Kingdom. Her crew were rescued. She was on a voyage from Danzig to Bordeaux, Gironde, France.

== 31 December ==
List of shipwrecks: 31 December 1829
Ship	State	Description
Louise	United Kingdom	The ship was run down and sunk in the English Channel off Start Point, Devon, by a Maltese vessel. Her crew survived. She was on a voyage from Newport, Monmouthshire to Rouen, Seine-Inférieure, France.

== Unknown date ==
List of shipwrecks: Unknown date in December 1829
Ship	State	Description
Concord	United Kingdom	The ship foundered off the coast of Ireland.
Diana	United Kingdom	The ship was driven ashore and wrecked near Berwick upon Tweed, Northumberland, with the loss of all hands.
Henry	United Kingdom	The ship was driven ashore near Boston, Lincolnshire. She was on a voyage from Saint Petersburg, Russia, to King's Lynn, Norfolk.
Leenio	United Kingdom	The ship was lost near Ingoldmells, Lincolnshire.
Nelson	United Kingdom	The ship was driven ashore near Bowness-on-Solway, Cumberland.
Margaret	United Kingdom	The ship was driven ashore and wrecked at Powfoot, Wigtownshire.
Marigold	United Kingdom	The ship was driven ashore at North Somercotes, Lincolnshire.
Phœbe	United Kingdom	The ship was wrecked in the Bay of Luce.
Sportsman	United Kingdom	The ship was in collision with a brig off the Calf of Man, Isle of Man. She was subsequently driven ashore and wrecked at "Port Wash". Her crew were rescued. She was on a voyage from Liverpool, Lancashire, to Virginia, United States.
Three Sisters	United Kingdom	The ship foundered in the Atlantic Ocean (49°00′N 15°00′W). She was on a voyage from Alexandria, Egypt to London.
Union	United Kingdom	The ship foundered before 14 December. Her crew were rescued on 16 December by Deux Victoires (France). Union was on a voyage from Cork to Bristol, Gloucestershire.
Urania	France	The ship was wrecked on Gotland, Sweden. She was on a voyage from Saint Petersburg to Le Havre, Seine-Inférieure.
