= Sir James Henry Craig (1811 ship) =

History

United Kingdom
- Name: Sir James Henry Craig
- Namesake: James Henry Craig
- Builder: John Hare, William Henry Dockyard, William Henry
- Launched: 13 November 1811
- Fate: Condemned November 1817

General characteristics
- Tons burthen: 67064/94, or 677, or 680, or 686, (bm)
- Length: 137 ft 0 in (41.8 m), or 142 ft 3 in (43.4 m)
- Beam: 33 ft 11 in (10.3 m)
- Armament: 18 × 9-pounder guns + 2 × 24-pounder guns "of the New Construction"

Sir James Henry Craig was launched at Quebec in 1811. She sailed to England and made three voyages as a West Indiaman. The British East India Company (EIC), in 1813 lost its monopoly on the trade between Britain and India. In 1817 she sailed for India but was condemned at Calcutta after she sustained extensive storm-damage at the start of her homeward-bound voyage.

== Career ==
Sir James Henry Craig, Kippen, master, was cleared for London in November 1811. She then arrived at Deal, from Quebec. She was re-registered in London prior to 19 May 1812.

Sir James Henry Craig first appeared in Lloyd's Register (LR) for 1813 with Kippen, master, changing to Taylor, Linthorne, owner, changing to Dawson & Co., and trade London–Quebec, changing to London–Jamaica.

Lloyd's Register for 1815 listed her with A. Davidson, master, changing to M'Iver, J. Dawson, owner, and trade London–Jamaica. She had undergone repairs for damages in 1813 and 1814. In 1816 she was offered for sale or charter. The advertisement described her as having been built for the East India trade. She had only made three voyages to Jamaica, was copper-fastened and had been coppered in 1815. She had just come out of a dry dock.

In 1813 the EIC had lost its monopoly on the trade between India and Britain. British ships were then free to sail to India or the Indian Ocean under a licence from the EIC.

Captain B. Browne, owner and master, sailed her from England on 30 March 1817, bound for Bombay, under a license from the EIC.

== Fate ==
On 13 September 1817 Sir James Henry Craig, Brown, master, put back to Calcutta after sailing for London. She had endured 14 days of gales that had left leaking and with her mainmast and bowsprit sprung. It was expected that she would transship her cargo in October and that she would go into dock to be condemned. She was condemned on 14 November. She was then sold for breaking up.
