= Philip Craig =

Philip Craig may refer to:

- Phil Craig (South African politician)
- Philip R. Craig (1923–2007), American mystery writer

== See also ==
- Craig (surname)
- James Philip Craig (born 1943), Scottish footballer also known as Jim Craig
- Paul Philip Craig (born 1951), English legal scholar and academic
- Philip Craig Russell (born 1951), American comic book writer, artist and illustrator
