= Governor Craig =

Governor Craig may refer to:

- George N. Craig (1909–1992), 39th Governor of Indiana
- James Henry Craig (1748–1812), Governor-General of Canada from 1807 to 1811
- Locke Craig (1860–1924), 53rd Governor of North Carolina
