= Charles Craig =

Charles or Charlie Craig may refer to:

== Arts and entertainment ==
- Charles Craig (actor) (fl. 1900s–1930s), American actor
- Charles Craig (tenor) (1919–1997), English opera singer
- Charlie Craig (songwriter) (1938–2011), American songwriter
- Charlie Craig (screenwriter), American television producer and writer

== Sports ==
- Charlie Craig (footballer) (1876–1933), Scottish footballer
- Charlie Craig (baseball) (1905–?), American baseball player
- Charles Craig (triple jumper) (born 1942), American triple jumper

== Others ==
- Charles C. Craig (1865–1944), American jurist and politician
- Charles Craig (British politician) (1869–1960), Northern Irish politician, Member of Parliament for South Antrim 1903–1922 and Antrim 1922–1929
- Charles L. Craig (1872–1935), comptroller for New York City

== See also ==
- Craig Charles (born 1964), English actor
- Charles Craig Cannon (1914–1992), US Army officer
