= Sir James Gibson-Craig, 1st Baronet =

Scottish lawyer and government official

Sir James Gibson-Craig, 1st Baronet W.S.
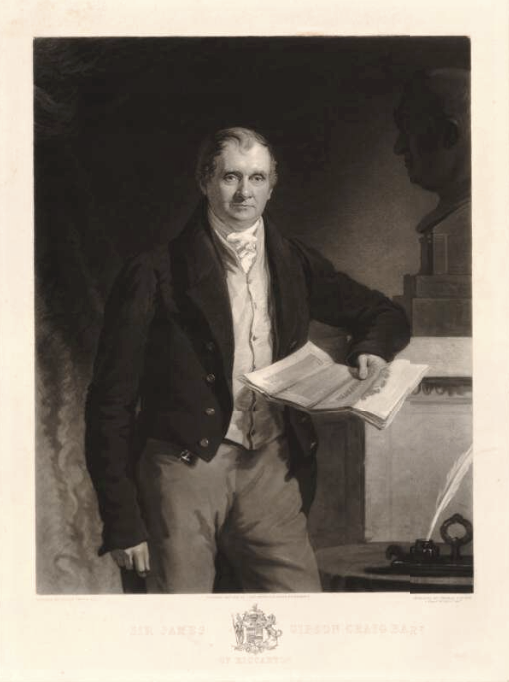
- Portrait of Sir James Gibson-Craig, 1st Baronet from 1846
- Born: 1765
- Died: 1850 (aged 84–85)
- Occupation: lawyer

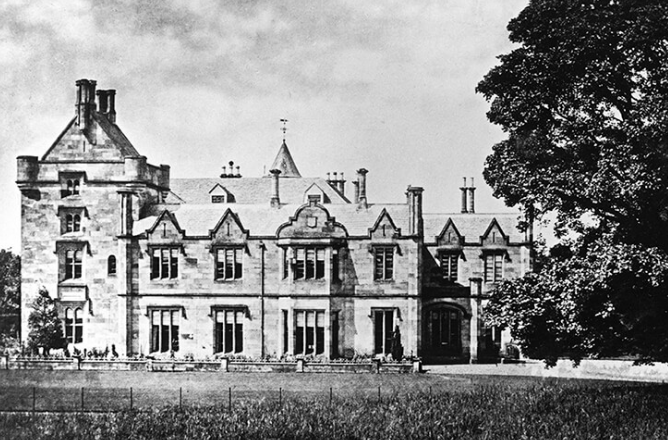
Riccarton House near Edinburgh

Sir James Gibson-Craig, 1st Baronet (1765–1850) was a Scottish lawyer and government official. In politics he was a Foxite Whig. In early life he was known as James Gibson of Ingleston. He was created a baronet in the Baronetage of the United Kingdom in 1831.

== Life ==
Born James Gibson he was the second son of William Gibson, an Edinburgh merchant. His mother was Mary Cecilia Balfour, daughter of James Balfour of Pilrig.

Gibson was educated at Edinburgh High School, and became a Writer to the Signet in 1786. He was a partner in the law firm Craig, Dalziel & Brodie.

In 1831 Gibson's political services were recognised with a baronetcy from the Grey administration. He died at his Riccarton estate on 6 March 1850. In 1832 he inherited the Riccarton estate from his uncle Robert Craig of Riccarton (1730–1823) on condition that he adopted the surname "Gibson-Craig".

His Tory friends included Charles Kirkpatrick Sharpe, who dedicated to him his 1837 edition of a poem The Valiant Christian by George Gordon, 1st Marquess of Huntly.

== Politics ==
In the 1780s a group of Edinburgh Whig lawyers came together under the name "Independent Friends", and Gibson was one of them. The leaders included Henry Erskine and Malcolm Laing. William Adam of Blair Adam and Sir Thomas Dundas acted as their liaison with English opposition politicians. Gibson was neither a public speaker nor a writer, but as an organiser in the group, he played a "leading but backstage" role.

Early in the history of the group, Gibson and others became involved in a theatrical feud between English actors appearing in Edinburgh, James Fennell and William Woods (1751–1806). Woods was a friend of Robert Fergusson, and of Robert Burns who wrote him a prologue for a 1787 benefit performance of the Merry Wives of Windsor. Matters came to a head over roles in a 1788 performance of Venice Preserv'd at the Theatre Royal, Edinburgh, managed by John Jackson. In it Jackson gave Fennell the role of Jaffier, and Woods the role of Pierre, and there was a riot in the audience. Henry Erskine sent a letter to the theatre manager, backing the claim of Woods to play Jaffier, signed by more than 180 others. The matter became a legal case. In his claim for damages, Fennell named, amongst others, John Wilde, John Clerk, Gibson and David Cathcart.

The events of the French Revolution of 1789 cast the supporters of Charles James Fox in a new light. Gibson's own account of Edinburgh's Foxite Whigs during the early 1790s was not made public for nearly two generations. It appeared in a memoir of his friend John Allen, based on a letter Gibson had written to Allen's friend Charles Richard Fox. It gave accounts of a dinner in July 1791, organised in Edinburgh by Gibson and Allen, to celebrate the storming of the Bastille; and another Edinburgh political dinner given at this period by Lord Daer. The memoir was published with Allen's Inquiry into the Rise and Growth of the Royal Prerogative in England in 1849. Gibson commented that those who attended the Bastille dinner "formed the nucleus on which the liberal party of Scotland was founded". Writing of the Pittite repression of the 1790s, Henry Cockburn stated that it was hard to understand "how Thomas Muir could be transported and James Gibson not even tried."

Under the Ministry of All the Talents of 1806–7, Gibson was given an official position, solicitor of stamps. He replaced in the post George Buchan of Kelloe, the elder. Sir William Cunynghame, 4th Baronet became the collector of land tax in Scotland. These appointments were at the expense of "Melvillites", the place men of the influential Tory Robert Dundas, 2nd Viscount Melville. There was no wholesale cull of Tories to satisfy the partisan wishes of some Foxites, such as William Maule.

In 1821 Gibson set about uncovering the backers of the Beacon, a local Tory political paper that was making scurrilous attacks on Whigs. Feelings were running high, and an 1822 duel between James Stuart and Sir Alexander Boswell, 1st Baronet who wrote for the Beacon resulted in Boswell's death. Gibson pressed Sir William Rae, 3rd Baronet. Rae reluctantly gave the names of Sir William Arbuthnot, 1st Baronet and James Wedderburn; with Rae they had subscribed to a bond to pay for any debts of the Beacon.

For the Edinburghshire constituency, before the reform of 1832, Gibson-Craig and his group supported Sir George Clerk, 6th Baronet as Member of Parliament. Seeing, however, a prospect of change, Sir John Dalrymple, 5th Baronet and Gibson-Craig publicly withdrew their support in 1831, and Dalrymple was elected in the 1832 general election. In the city constituency of Edinburgh, Gibson-Craig proposed Francis Jeffrey and Adam Black proposed James Abercromby, both of whom were elected, ahead of the Tory Forbes Blair.

In relation to the freedom of the city of Edinburgh granted to Henry Brougham, who was born there, Noctes Ambrosianae (vol. II) commented on Gibson in the terms:

"The provosts and bailies thought more of your James Gibsons, your Cockburns, Jeffreys, and so forth, than of any body so much out of their own sphere as Master Brougham."

== Landowner ==
In 1797 Gibson purchased Haltoun House and its estate. He proceeded to break up the estate into smaller units and sell them off. It left the ancient mansion with 500 acres (200 ha). In 1801 he bought the Dairsie estate in Fifeshire from the Marchioness of Titchfield. He sold it in 1806 to Henry Trail.

Gibson succeeded in 1823 to an estate at Riccarton, Midlothian left to him by a relation, Robert Craig. He consequently changed his surname to Gibson-Craig.

== Family ==
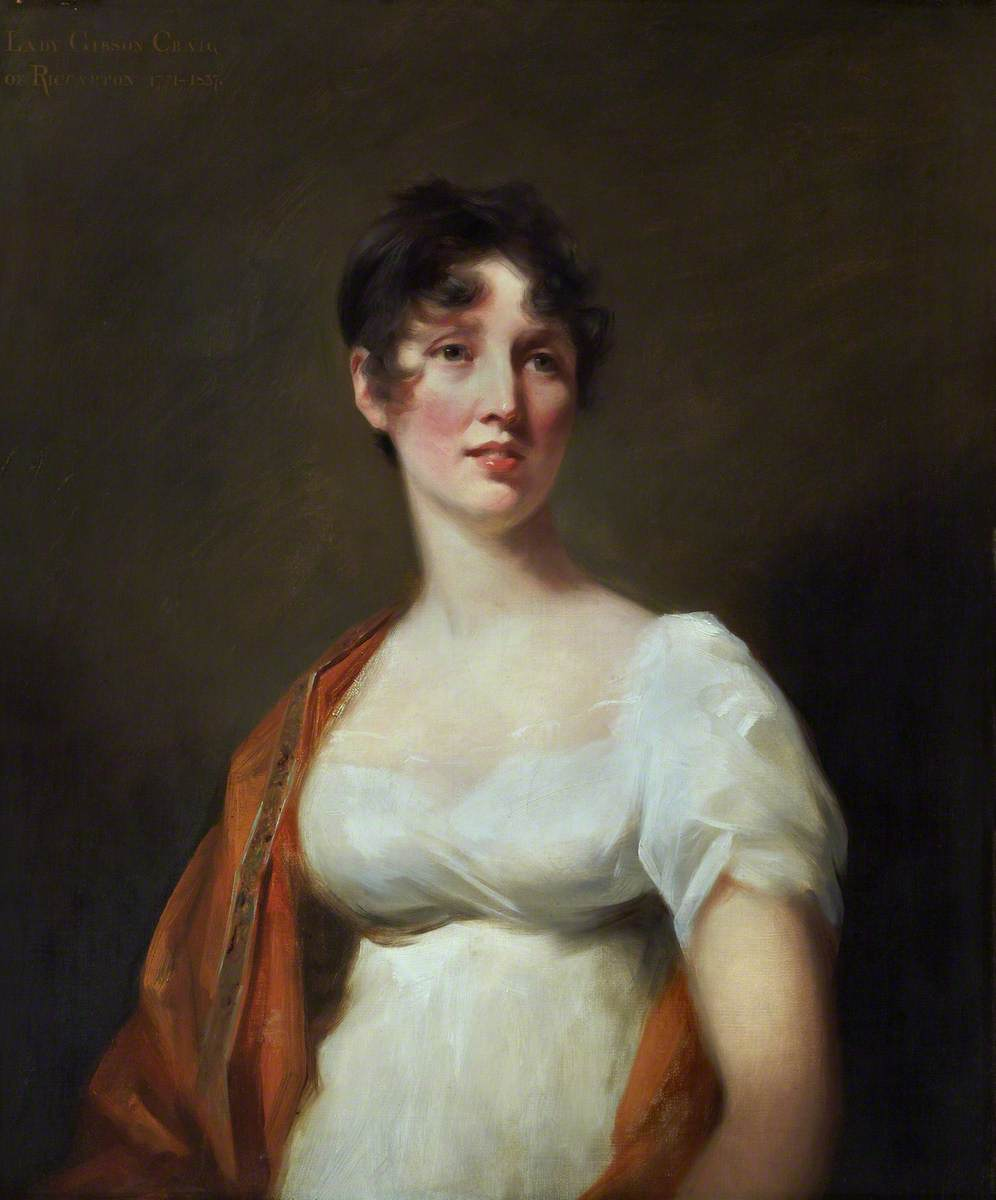
Lady Anne Gibson-Craig (1771–1837), painting by Henry Raeburn, circa 1806.

Gibson-Craig married in 1796 Ann Thomson, daughter of James Thomson, of Edinburgh. They had two sons and seven daughters. He was succeeded by his elder son Sir William Gibson-Craig, 2nd Baronet. The other son was James Thomson Gibson-Craig.

- Mary Cecilia, eldest daughter, married in 1824 William Kaye of the Middle Temple.
- Margaret Christian
- Anne, third daughter, married in 1828 John Hay Mackenzie; and was mother of Anne Sutherland-Leveson-Gower, Duchess of Sutherland.
- Cecilia Helen
- Joanna
- Helen, married 1834 Biggs Andrews QC.
- Jemima Campbell
