= Craig James =

Craig James may refer to:

- Craig James (politician) (born 1941), U.S. Representative from Florida
- Craig James (running back) (born 1961), American football commentator and former player
- Craig James (economist) (born 1962), Australian economist
- Craig James (footballer, born 1982), English footballer
- Craig James (defensive back) (born 1996), American football safety

== See also ==
- James Craig (disambiguation)
