= William Craig =

Bill, Billy, Will, Willie or William Craig may refer to:

== Politicians ==
- William Gibson-Craig (1797–1878), Scottish Lord Clerk Register
- William Young Craig (1827–1924), British MP for North Staffordshire, 1880–1885
- William Craig (Canadian politician) (1828–1897), Legislative Assembly of Ontario member
- William Benjamin Craig (1877–1925), American congressman from Alabama
- William Craig (Northern Ireland politician) (1924–2011), founder of Unionist Vanguard movement

== Sportsmen ==
- Billy Craig (rugby league) (1898–1980), Australian rugby league player
- Billy Craig (footballer) (1929–2011), Scottish footballer
- Bill Craig (swimmer) (1945–2017), American Olympic gold medalist
- Will Craig (born 1994), American baseball first baseman

== Writers ==
- William Craig, Lord Craig (1745–1813), Scottish judge and essayist
- William Marshall Craig (before 1760–1827), English painter and lecture author
- William Craig (botanist) (1832–1922), Scottish surgeon and science writer
- William James Craig (1843–1906), Anglo-Irish editor of Oxford Shakespeare
- William Craig (priest) (1873–1957), Canadian dean of Ontario and sermon writer
- William Craig (philosopher) (1918–2016), American academic at UC Berkeley
- William Craig (author) (1929–1997), American historian and novelist
- Bill Craig (writer) (1930–2002), Scottish TV scriptwriter
- William Lane Craig (born 1949), American philosopher and theologian
- William Stuart Mcrae Craig (1903–1975), English physician and medical author

== Others ==
- William Craig (frontiersman) (1807–1869), American pioneer and trapper
- William Grindley Craig (1818–1886), Scottish railway engineer and designer
- William Craig (Secret Service) (1855–1902), American agent for Theodore Roosevelt
- William Benson Craig (1896–1918), Canadian flying ace during World War I
- William Craig (businessman) (1903–1972), Scottish co-founder of West Coast Motor Service Company
- William Craig (broadcaster), Canadian TV executive since 1970s
