= Glasgow Citybus =

Scottish bus operator

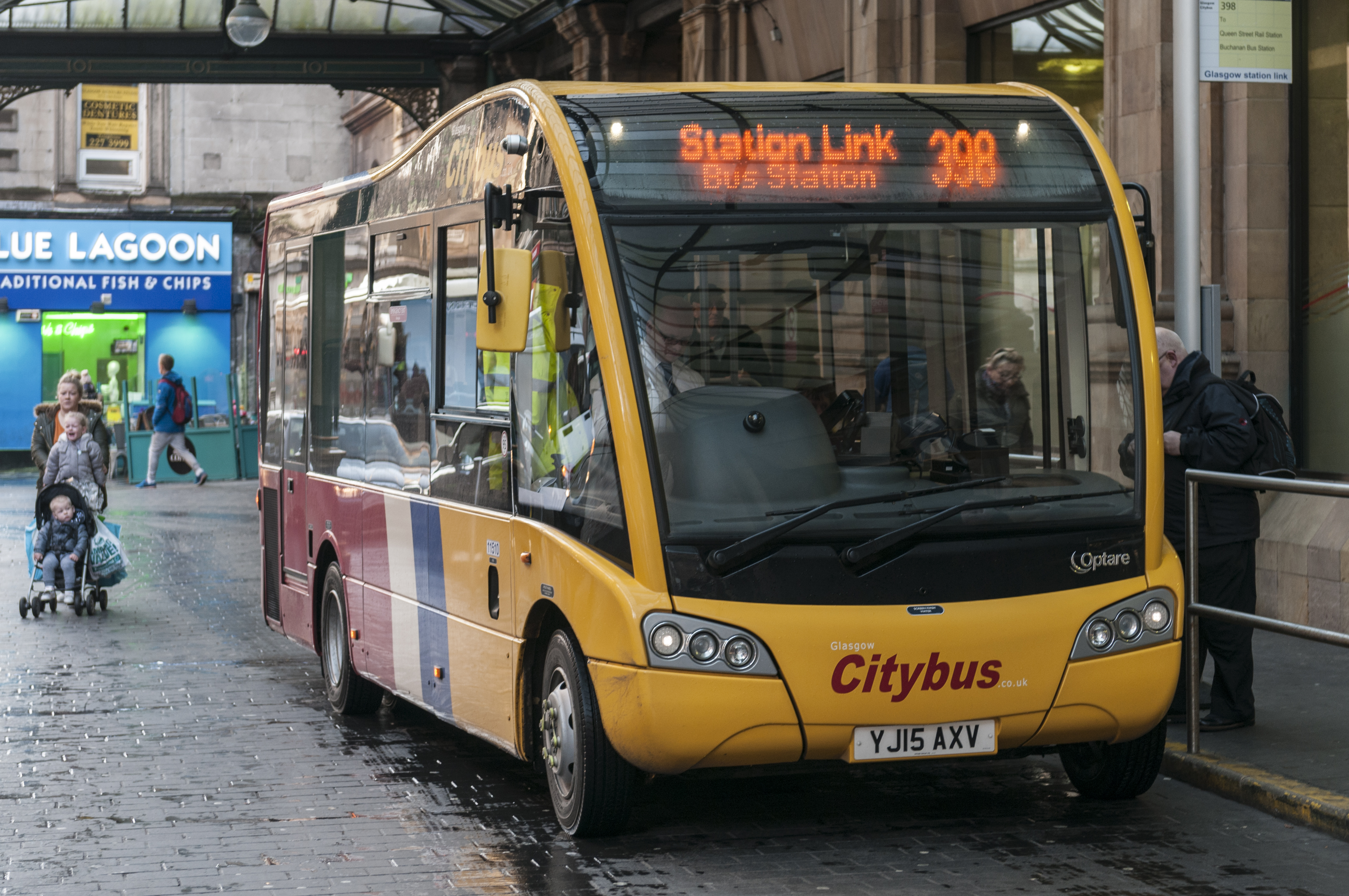
- An Optare Solo SR, branded in the company's former corporate livery, at Glasgow Central
- Parent: West Coast Motors
- Founded: 1999 (27 years ago)
- Headquarters: Benmhor; Saddell Street; Campbeltown
- Service area: Dunbartonshire; Glasgow
- Service type: Bus and coach
- Depots: 1
- Managing Director: Colin Robert Craig
- Website: www.westcoastmotors.co.uk

Glasgow Citybus was a bus company operating services across Glasgow and Dunbartonshire. It was a subsidiary of West Coast Motors.

== History ==
Glasgow Citybus was formed in November 1999, by Russell Arden. The company was acquired by Campbeltown-based West Coast Motors in January 2006.

Under the ownership of West Coast Motors, the company went on to acquire Glasgow's City Sightseeing franchise in January 2008, John Morrow Coaches of Clydebank in March 2012, and Fairline Coaches in November 2013.

Between February and May 2012, Glasgow Citybus received an order of fifteen brand new Alexander Dennis Enviro 200 vehicles – at a cost of £1.8 million. This investment saw the average age of the fleet, at the time, reduced to just two years old.

In April 2015, the company was awarded the contract to operate the 398 shuttle service, on behalf of Abellio ScotRail, connecting Glasgow Central and Glasgow Queen Street. The service is currently operated by Alexander Dennis Enviro 200 MMCs, branded in a dark blue livery, with Abellio ScotRail branding.

On 31 January 2023, the company was absorbed into West Coast Motors, and the name Glasgow Citybus was dropped.

== Fleet and operations ==
The Glasgow Citybus fleet consisted mainly of vehicles manufactured by Alexander Dennis. At the time of absorption into the parent company, the company operated from a single depot located on South Street in Glasgow.

== Livery and branding ==
Originally, vehicles were branded in a red and yellow livery, which featured a blue and red diagonal stripe. The livery and logo was updated in 2017, to the style of parent company, West Coast Motors. Vehicles were then branded in a cream and red livery, with a blue stripe along the length of the vehicle, with a Glasgow Citybus logo. All vehicles were then rebranded as West Coast Motors when absorbed.

== See also ==
- West Coast Motors
