= John Craig =

John Craig or Craige may refer to:

== Religion ==
- John Craig (reformer) (c. 1512–1600), Scottish minister and ancestor of Reverend John Craig, (1709–1774)
- John Craig (priest) (1805–1877), English clergyman responsible for All Saints Leamington Spa and the Craig telescope
- John Duncan Craig (1831–1909), Irish poet, writer and Church of Ireland clergyman

== Sciences ==
- John Craig (physician) (died 1620), Scottish physician
- John Craig (mathematician) (1663–1731), Scottish mathematician
- John Craig (geologist) (1796–1880), Scottish geologist and lexicographer

== Military ==
- John Manson Craig (1896–1970), Scottish recipient of the Victoria Cross
- John R. Craig (1906–1943), officer in the United States Navy

== Politics ==
- John Craig (Ontario MPP) (1843–1898), newspaper publisher and politician in Ontario, Canada
- John B. Craig (born 1945), American diplomat
- John Alexander Craig (1880–1968), political figure in Ontario

== Business ==
- John D. Craig (1903–1997), American businessman, entertainer, and deep-sea diver
- John Craig, a retail chain in South Africa

== Sports ==
- John Craig (rugby union) (1918–1976), Scotland international rugby union player
- John Craige (wrestler) (1886–1954), American, competed at the 1908 Summer Olympics

== Others ==
- John Craig (actor) (1866–1932), American actor-manager
- John Craig (classicist) (1887–1968), Scottish classicist, professor at the University of Sheffield
- John C. Craig, architect in Salt Lake City, Utah
- John Craig (economist), British economist
- Johnny Craig (1926–2001), American comic book artist
- John Craig (fictional agent), character in a series of spy thrillers by author James Munro

== See also ==
- Jon Craig (born 1957), chief political correspondent of Sky News
- Jon Craig (architect) (c. 1941–2015), New Zealand architect
- Jonathan Craig, Northern Irish Unionist politician
- Johnny Craig (1926–2001), American comic book artist
- Jonny Craig (born 1986), Canadian-American singer/songwriter
