= West Coast Motors =

Bus, coach, and ferry operator in Argyll, Scotland

Craig of Campbeltown Limited

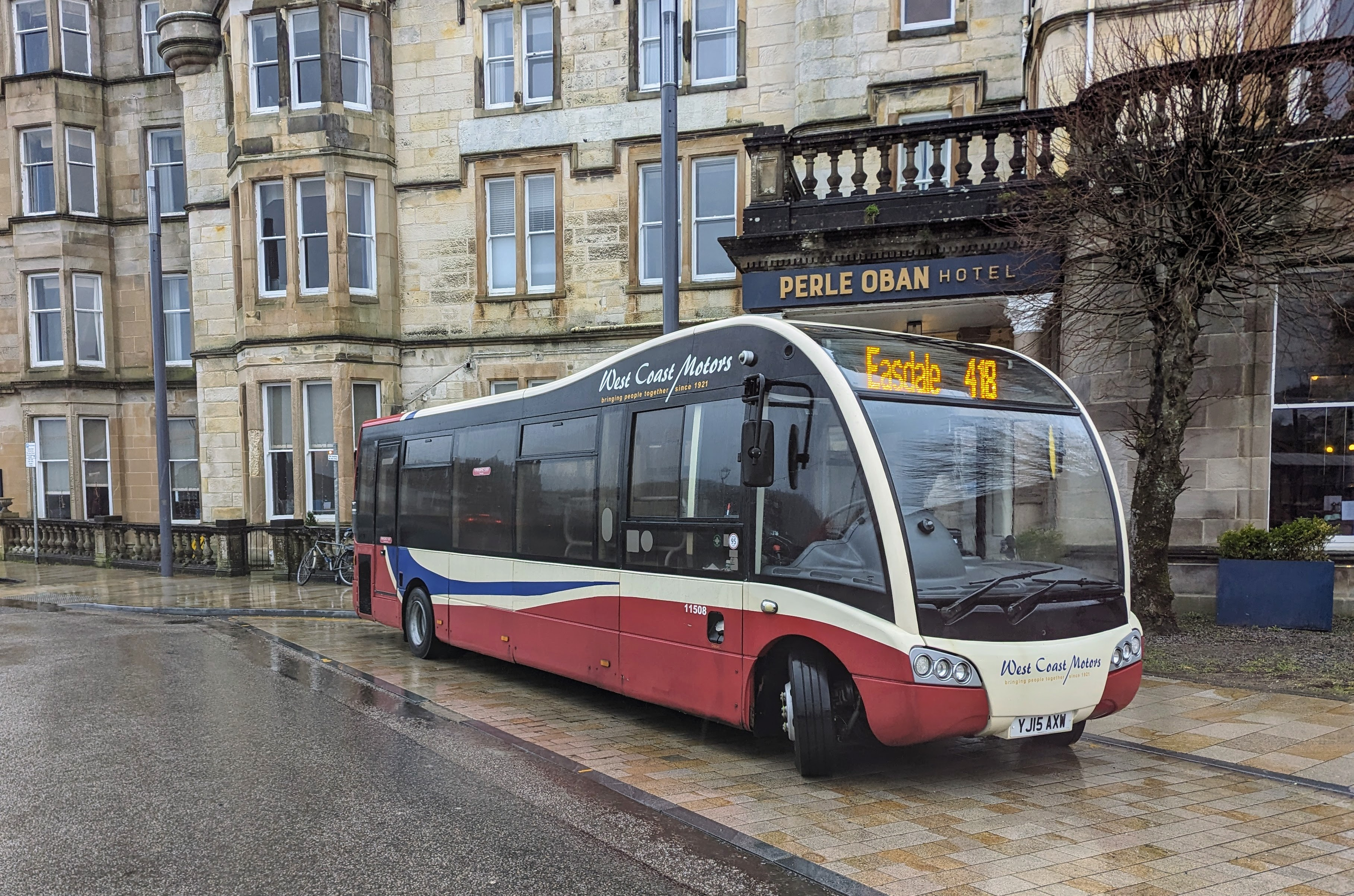
- An Optare Solo SR, seen at Oban in March 2024
- Founded: 1921 (105 years ago)
- Headquarters: Campbeltown, Scotland, UK
- Service area: Argyll & Bute; Cumbria; Dunbartonshire; East Lothian; Edinburgh; Glasgow; Renfrewshire; Midlothian; Northumberland; Scottish Borders; Scottish Highlands
- Service type: Bus, coach and ferry
- Fleet: 270
- Managing Director: Colin Robert Craig
- Website: www.westcoastmotors.co.uk

West Coast Motors (legally incorporated as Craig of Campbeltown Limited) is a bus, coach and ferry operator, based in Campbeltown, Scotland. The company also operates under the name Borders Buses in the Scottish Borders and formerly under the Glasgow Citybus brand in Greater Glasgow.

== History ==
The founding of the company dates back to 1921, when Jack Craig commenced a bus operation in Campbeltown. In 1935, William Craig convinced the Royal Mail to allow him to commence an overnight road service from Campbeltown to Glasgow, in lieu of transporting mail by ship. The company remained a Royal Mail contractor until October 2011.

In 1950, the business purchased Dickies of Tarbert, along with the service between East and West Loch Tarbert Piers. In 1955, haulage company West Coast Transport was formed. After purchasing James McPhee Haulage and Ramsays Haulage in 1963, the business was sold to British Road Services in 1966.

In 1970, McConnachie's was purchased, resulting in West Coast operating all services in the Kintyre area. In 1982, McColls of Benderloch was purchased, along with the Oban to Benderloch and Easdale services. In 1986, Stag Garage of Lochgilphead was purchased, along with services to Ford, Kilmartin and Ormsary. In 1999, West Coast Motors purchased Oban & District Buses.

In 2004, West Coast Motors commenced operating in Bute and Cowal, after taking over services from Stagecoach, along with depots in Dunoon and Rothesay. In 2006, service between Oban and Dalavich was purchased from L.F. Stewart & Son, along with Kilberry and Skipness services from D & E Henderson Hiring.

In January 2008, the City Sightseeing franchise in Glasgow was purchased, followed in 2009 by the Kintyre Express ferry operation. Kintyre Express later commenced operating a ferry service from Campbeltown to Ballycastle, in 2011.

In June 2013, Bowman's Tours on the Isle of Mull was purchased, along with 10 vehicles, and was renamed West Coast Tours. In November 2013, the company acquired Fairline Coaches in Glasgow, along with 16 vehicles.

On 12 June 2023, West Coast Motors took over the Tighnabruaich-Otter Ferry and the Tighnabruaich local service from Tighnabruaich Service Station, giving West Coast Motors full dominance on mainland Argyll, excluding Garelochhead Coaches in Lochgoilhead and express operators.

=== Borders Buses ===
In February 2016, Perryman's Buses of Berwick-upon-Tweed was purchased by West Coast Motors. The sale included 45 vehicles, and both depots at Berwick-upon-Tweed and St. Boswells. Later in the same year, Perryman's also took over several services from First Scotland East. The remainder of First's operations in the Scottish Borders, including the depot at Galashiels, as well as outstations at Hawick, Kelso and Peebles, was sold to West Coast Motors in March 2017.

In July 2017, the business was re-branded as Borders Buses. Re-branding saw the introduction of a new cream and red corporate livery, with a blue stripe along the length of the vehicle. Some vehicles operating on key routes have since received route-specific branding, based on the corporate livery.

=== Glasgow Citybus ===
Glasgow Citybus was purchased by West Coast Motors in 2006. The company operates local bus services in Glasgow and Dunbartonshire, with a fleet of around 60 vehicles.

=== Scottish Citylink ===
As well as operating local bus services, West Coast Motors has, since 1986, operated long-distance express services on behalf of Scottish Citylink. West Coast Motors mainly serve the route between Glasgow and Campbeltown, but also operate on other routes, serving Dundee, Edinburgh, Fort William, Oban and the Isle of Skye.

In May 2008, the company refused to sign a new contract to operate Scottish Citylink routes in the Highlands, and launched a series of routes in competition. Two months later, the services were withdrawn, with a new contract drawn up between the two companies. West Coast Motors resumed operation of Scottish Citylink services in September 2008.

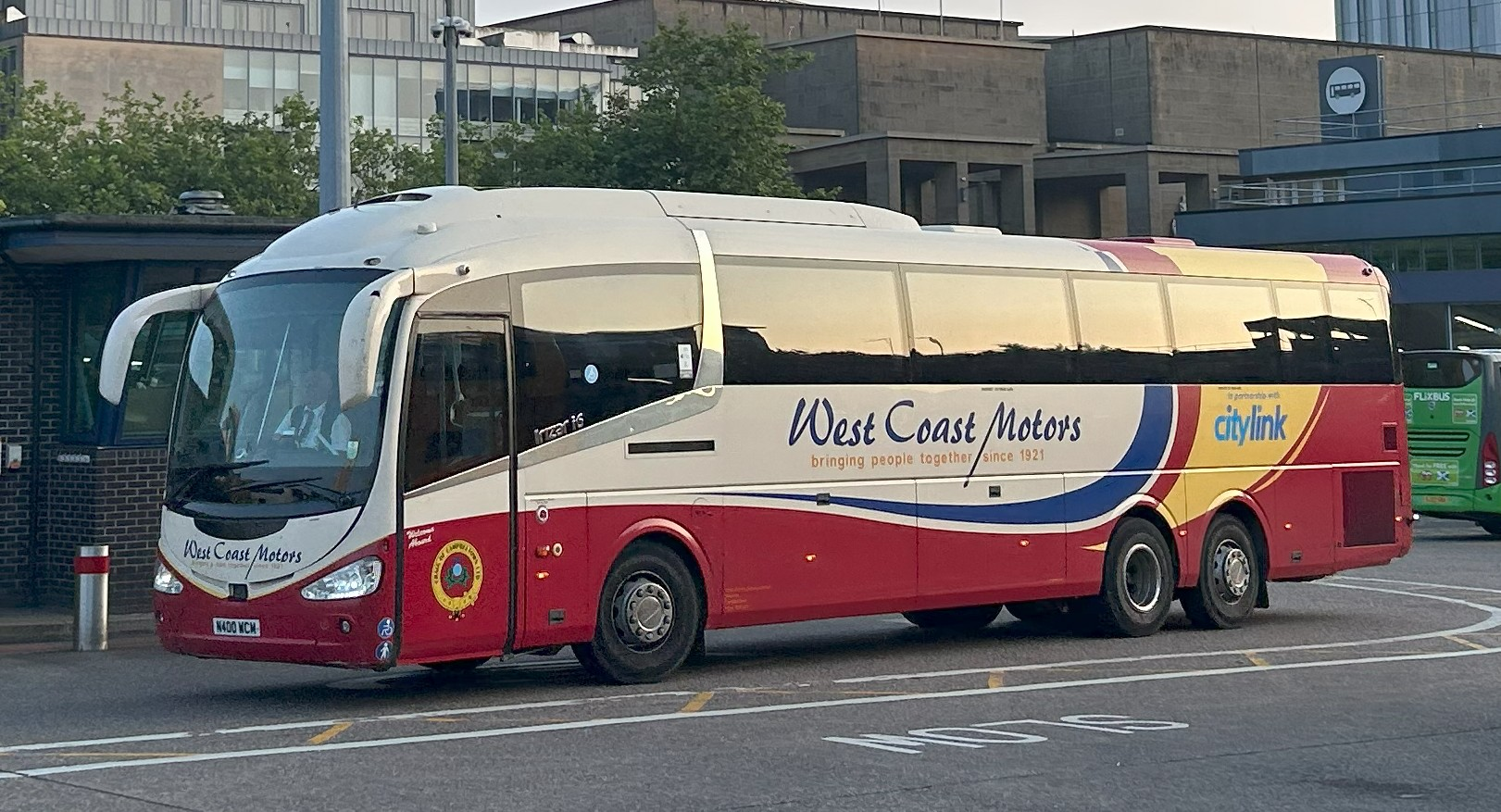
A Scottish Citylink branded Irizar i6 bodied Scania K360EB, seen at Buchanan Bus Station in July 2025

As of July 2025, West Coast Motors operates the following services on behalf of Scottish Citylink:

- 914, 915 & 916: Glasgow to Fort William and Skye (certain journeys)
- 918 & 919: Oban to Fort William and Inverness
- 926: Glasgow to Campbeltown
- 975/976: Glasgow to Oban
- 978: Edinburgh to Oban
- M9: Glasgow to Aberdeen (certain journeys)
- AIR: Glasgow to Edinburgh Airport
- 900: Glasgow to Edinburgh

== Operations ==
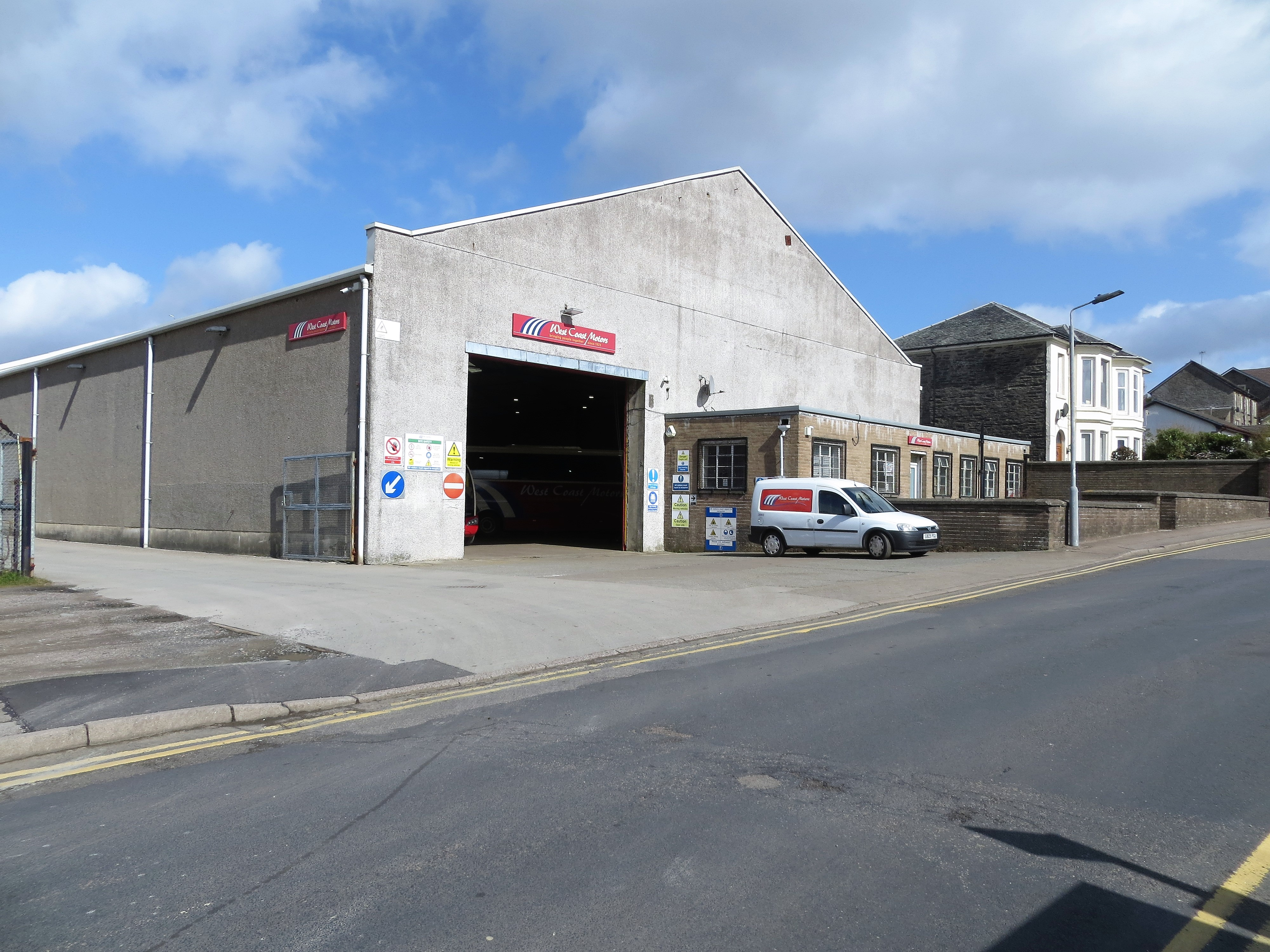
The depot in Dunoon

As of March 2020, West Coast Motors operate bus and coach services from eleven depots.

- Ardrishaig: Glenburn Road, Ardrishaig, Argyll and Bute
- Berwick-upon-Tweed: Ramparts Business Park, North Road, Berwick-upon-Tweed, Northumberland (Note: This depot is operated by Borders Buses.)
- Campbeltown: Benmore Street, Campbeltown, Argyll and Bute
- Dunoon: Argyll Road, Dunoon, Argyll and Bute
- Galashiels: Duke Street, Galashiels, Scottish Borders
- Glasgow: South Street, Glasgow (Note: This depot is operated by Glasgow Citybus.)
- Glasgow: Charles Street, Glasgow
- Mull: Birchwood, Craignure, Isle of Mull, Argyll and Bute
- Oban: Glengallan Road, Oban, Argyll and Bute
- Rothesay: High Road, Ardbeg, Rothesay, Argyll and Bute
- St. Boswells: Mitchells Yard, Charlesfield, St. Boswells, Melrose, Scottish Borders

== Fleet ==
As at August 2024, West Coast Motors operates a fleet of More than 200 buses and coaches (excluding the Borders Buses operation).
