= Senator Craig (disambiguation) =

Larry Craig (born 1945) was a U.S. Senator from Idaho from 1991 to 2009. Senator Craig may also refer to:

- Dave Craig (born 1979), Wisconsin State Senate
- David R. Craig (born 1949), Maryland State Senate
- Hearcel Craig (born 1949), Ohio State Senate
