= Albert Craig =

Albert Craig may refer to:

- Albert M. Craig (1927–2021), American professor of Japanese history
- Albert Craig (rhymester) (1849–1909), English writer of cricket verse, known as "The Surrey Poet"
- Albert Craig (footballer) (born 1962), Scottish former footballer
- Albert "Apple Gabriel" Craig, former member of Jamaican vocal trio Israel Vibration
