= John Wild (cricketer) =

English cricketer

John Wild is an English former cricketer active from 1953 to 1961 who played for Northamptonshire (Northants). He was born in Northampton on 24 February 1935. He appeared in 41 first-class matches as a righthanded batsman who bowled off spin. He scored 664 runs with a highest score of 95 and took 57 wickets with a best performance of four for 44.
