= John Craig (economist) =

John Craig of Glasgow was elected in 1818 to the Fellowship of the Royal Society of Edinburgh, from which he resigned about 1840. Otherwise, very little is known about his life.

Craig wrote the three-volume The Elements of Political Science (1814) and Remarks on Some Fundamental Doctrines in Political Economy (1821). He studied under John Millar (philosopher).

Bruce (1938) states that Craig "is continually on the verge of expressing the idea of marginal utility", became "the first exponent of the idea of the connection between utility and value", and "comes close to expressing the idea of consumers' surplus". Craig "not only pioneered in opposing the theories of his time, but laid the groundwork for the utility theory to follow."

His outstanding contribution to the discussion of wages is his opposition to the theories of the classical school: first, their theory that wages are fixed by the standard of life; second, the theory that a tax on wages necessarily raises wages; and third, the doctrine that wages and profits must vary inversely to each other.

Joseph Schumpeter (1954) states that Craig's Fundamental Doctrines was "a performance of considerable merit" and "a whole Marshall in nuce" (in a nutshell).
