= Robert Craig of Riccarton =

Scottish lawyer, landowner and political writer

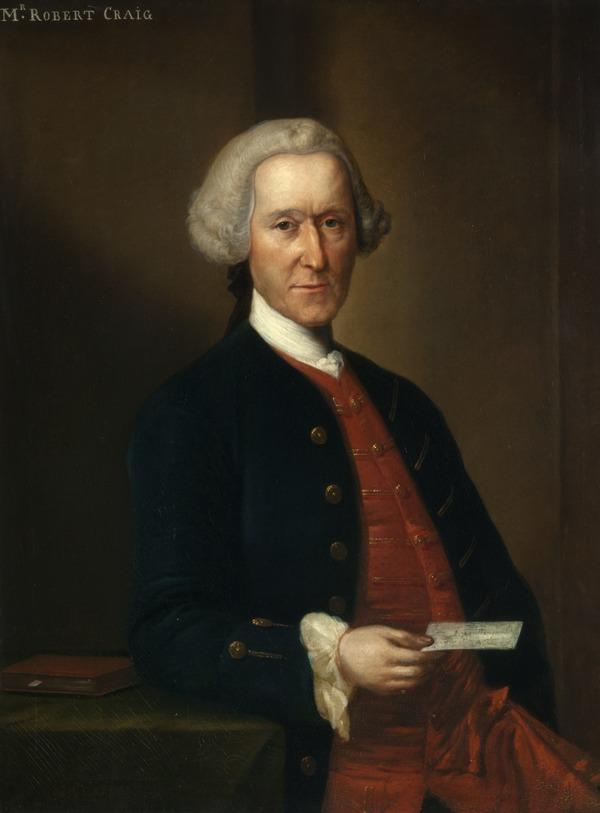
Andreas van der Mijn - Robert Craig of Riccarton

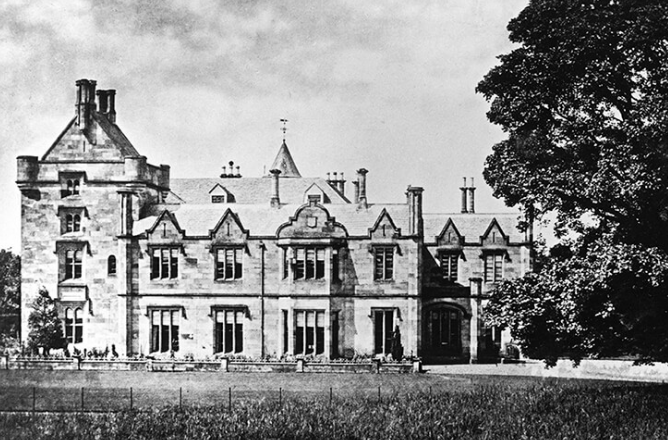
Riccarton House near Edinburgh

Robert Craig of Riccarton (1730–1823) was a Scottish lawyer, landowner and political writer. Immensely wealthy and childless, he was the patriarch catalyst to the dynasty of Gibson-Craig baronets.

He was born in Edinburgh in 1730 the son of James Craig, Professor of Civil Law at the University of Edinburgh and great-great-grandson of Sir Thomas Craig of Riccarton. His mother was the daughter of Robert Dundas, Lord Arniston a prominent law lord. His father died when he was young and Thomas became Laird of the Riccarton estate to the west of Edinburgh, with Riccarton House at its centre.

He studied law at Edinburgh University, and qualified as an advocate in 1754. In 1775 he is listed as living "near Crichton's coach works" at the east end of the Canongate in Edinburgh, around 1 km from the law courts. In 1776 he was appointed a Judge of the Commissary Court, resigning this position in 1791.

On the building of the First New Town in Edinburgh, Craig lived with his brother Thomas at 9 Princes Street. Around 1795 he bought his own house at 91 Princes Street and this was his townhouse for business purposes.

He died on 13 March 1823 aged 93. The Riccarton estate passed to his nephew, Sir James Gibson-Craig (1765–1850).

The Riccarton estate was requisitioned in 1939 for army use, and was the base for the liberation of Norway. From 1947 to 1954 it was the headquarters for the Royal Artillery's 3rd Anti-Aircraft Division, and it was demolished in 1956 having fallen into very poor condition. The estate was redeveloped in the later 20th century to create a campus for Heriot Watt University having been purchased by Midlothian County Council for this purpose in 1969.

== Artistic recognition ==
Craig's portrait in oils is held in the Scottish National Portrait Gallery.

He was also caricatured sitting outside his Princes Street house by John Kay.
