= 2nd Battalion, 321st Field Artillery Regiment =

Inactive US army unit

1st Battalion, 321st Field Artillery Regiment
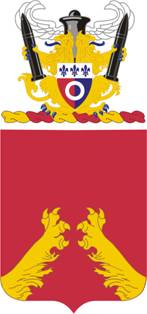
- Coat of arms
- Country: United States
- Branch: Army
- Type: Field artillery
- Size: battalion
- Garrison/HQ: inactive
- Motto: "Noli Me Tangere" (Don’t Tread On Me)

Insignia
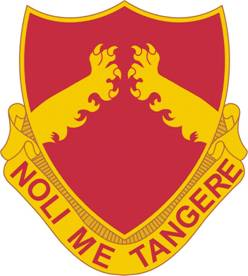
- Distinctive unit insignia

- Beret flash

The 2nd Battalion, 321st Field Artillery Regiment (2-321 FAR) is an inactive field artillery battalion of the United States Army. The battalion served in World War I, World War II, Vietnam and the Global War on Terrorism with the 82nd Airborne and 101st Airborne Divisions. The battalion was inactivated in 2014 as part of force reductions.

== History ==
=== World War I ===
2-321 FAR traces its lineage to Battery B, 321st Field Artillery, which organized on 2 September 1917 at Camp Gordon, Georgia. After training at Camp Gordon until May 1918, the battery shipped to France, and participated with the regiment in the St. Mihiel, Meuse Argonne and Lorraine 1918 campaigns. Following the Armistice, the battery redeployed to the United States and was demobilized at Camp Dix, New Jersey in May 1919.

=== Vietnam ===
The 3d Brigade, 82d Airborne Division, with 2-321 AFAR attached from the Division Artillery, was alerted to deploy to Vietnam on 12 February 1968. The battalion commander was LTC Howard C. Jelinek. At the time of notification, the battalion was at 50% strength, but received 211 "fillers" from within the 82d Division Artillery over the 16 hours following the deployment notification and deployed at 100% strength of 458 personnel (39 officers, 2 warrant officers and 416 enlisted personnel). Elements of the battalion deployed over the next two weeks. Battery A deployed with Task Force (TF) Privette (2d Battalion, 505th Parachute Infantry Regiment [2-505 PIR]), arriving at Chu Lai between 16 and 19 February 1968. Battery C followed as part of TF Carpenter (1-508 PIR), arriving between 19 and 21 February 1968. The battalion headquarters controlled TF Jelinek, arriving from 21–23 February 1968, and Battery B deployed with TF Jameson (1-505 PIR), arriving 23–26 February 1968. The last aircraft in the brigade arrived at 0800hrs on 27 February 1968. Upon arrival in Vietnam, the battalion conducted in-country orientation training at the 23d Americal Division Combat Training Center under the operational control of the 1st Battalion, 14th Field Artillery. During the 6 days of training, Battery C was credited with the brigade’s first kill on 28 February 1968. Battery A provided direct support to 2-505 PIR from Fire Base Fat City, and then moved north by air with 2-505 PIR and established a fire base in Phu Bai base defense perimeter. Battery B provided direct support to 1-505 PIR from Fire Base Fat City, and Battery C provided direct support to 1-508 PIR from Landing Zone (LZ) Gator. On 2 March 1968, the battalion (less Battery A) began preparations to move north to Hue/Phu Bai. The brigade (less 2-505 PIR) departed Chu Lai by road in three serials, on 3, 4 and 6 March 1968. Each serial stopped at Da Nang overnight and arrived at Hue/Phu Bai on 4, 5 and 7 March 1968 without enemy contact. Upon arrival in Hue/Phu Bai, the brigade began development of Camp Rodriguez at map coordinates YD817147. Beginning 9 March 1968, the brigade conducted Operation Carentan I. The battalion counter-mortar radar supported from Camp Rodriguez. Battery A occupied FSB Panther in support of 2-505 PIR. Battery B supported 1-505 PIR from FSB Mongoose. When the brigade’s area of operations expanded ((on 29 March 1968??)), Battery B moved to FSB Sally. On 28 March 1968, Battery C received 20 rounds of 122mm rockets, wounding one man and damaging two ¼-ton trucks. The rocket fire ceased when the battalion fired its counter-rocket program and the radar siting. On 30 March 1968, Battery B received 8 rounds of 82mm mortar, wounding three men and damaging the mess tent. Again, the fire ceased in response to the battalion’s counter-mortar fire. On 3 April, Battery C moved by road to FSB Geronimo in order to support 1-508 PIR in Area of Operations (AO) Bass. Battery A provided support from FSB Sally, supporting 1-501 PIR (attached to the brigade from the 101st Airborne Division) from 28 March – 15 April 1968. From deployment through 30 April 1968, the battalion fired 21,564 rounds during 1,437 missions.

The 2-321 began May 1968 supporting Operation Delaware, with batteries at FSBs Boyd (Battery A) and Geronimo (Battery B), and at Camp Rodriguez (Battery C). On 3 May 1968, Battery B moved by road from FSB Geronimo to Camp Rodriguez, and Battery C moved from Camp Rodriguez to FSB Birmingham. On 26 May 1968, the battalion stood down for reorganization and training because of personnel rotation. The training emphasized FDC and FO procedures and airmobile operations. On 3 July 1968, Battery B conducted an artillery raid by air from FSB Panther II to FSB Panther III, fired 1000 rounds on suspected enemy positions and returned to FSB Panther II. On 9 July 1968, the battalion fired a preparation on LZ Green before it was occupied and developed into a battalion observation post. On 13 July 1968, the battalion, reinforced with medium and heavy artillery, conducted a one-hour prep of LZ Leach before elements of 1st Brigade assaulted the LZ. On 23 July 1968, Battery A moved by air from FSB Boyd to FSB Veghel. On 31 July 1968, Battery B moved by air from FSB Panther III to FSB Boyd.

The battalion began August 1968 with its headquarters at Camp Eagle, Battery A remained at FSB Veghel, Battery B at FSB Boyd, and Battery C at FSB Georgia. On 19 August 1968, Battery C moved by air from FSB Georgia to FSB Birmingham as part of the end of Operation SOMERSET PLAIN in the A Shau Valley. On 22 August 1968, Battery A moved by air to FSB Panther III to support operations in the southern part of 3d Brigade’s area of operations. On 23 August, Battery B moved by air from FSB Boyd to FSB Brick. On 3 September 1968, Battery B moved by air from FSB Brick to FSB Greer, and was replaced at FSB Brick by Battery C from FSB Birmingham. On 9 September 1968, Battery C moved from FSB Brick to FSB Boyd. On 10 September 1968, Battery A moved from FSB Panther III to FSB Birmingham. On 12 September 1968, Battery A moved from FSB Birmingham to Camp Eagle to prepare to move to III Corps with 3d Brigade. On 1 October 1968, Battery C deployed from Camp Eagle to III Corps. On 12 October 1968, Battery B moved from FSB Greer to FSB Anzio, then on 14 October moved to Phu Bai to join the rest of the battalion in III Corps.

February 1969 opened with Headquarters and Headquarters Battery at FSB Copperhead, along with Battery C, 3-197 Artillery in general support of the brigade. Battery A occupied FSB All American, Battery B FSB June and Battery C FSB Harrison. On 4 February 1969, Battery B moved by road to FSB Odessa in support of 2-505 Infantry. On 11 February, Battery B moved by helicopter to FSB Joe, continuing in support of 2-505. On 14 February 1969, Battery B moved by C-130 to Tan Son Nhut Air Force Base, and then by road to FSB Harrison to relieve Battery C. Battery C then displaced by road to FSB Hardcore. On 17 March 1969, Battery A moved to FSB Tracy by road. Battery C moved by helicopter to FSB Keene on 27 March 1969, and then on to FSB Hardcore on 29 March 1969.

From August to October 1969, HSB remained at FSB Copperhead. Battery A, with priority of fires to 1-505 PIR, occupied FSB Barbara until 15 August, then moved to FSB All American I until 10 September, then FSB All American II. Battery B, with priority of fires to 2-505 PIR, occupied FSB Harrison until 28 September. On 18 August 1969, Battery B fired in support of B/1-505, and was credited with one VC killed by artillery. On 28 September, Battery B moved to FSB Barbara until 15 October, and then moved to FSB Copperhead for standdown and re-deployed on 29 October. Battery C, with priority of fires to 1-508 PIR, occupied FSB Hardcore I until 15 August, then FSB Barbara until 28 September, then FSB Harrison until 1 October, then FSB Hardcore II. The unit began standdown for redeployment on 1 November 1969. Throughout the quarter, the battalion fired 66,525 rounds during 7,225 missions, and was credited with 16 enemy killed by artillery.

=== Later Cold War ===
Following redeployment from Vietnam, 2-321 continued to serve as a direct support battalion in the 82nd Airborne Division Artillery. In 1986, the battalion was inactivated and reflagged as 3-319 AFAR in conjunction with the implementation of the U.S. Army Regimental System.

=== Global War on Terror ===
As part of the transformation of the Army into modular brigade combat teams, 2-321 was reactivated as the 4th BCT, 82nd ABN's organic field artillery battalion. 2-321 deployed to Afghanistan three times, for OEF VII (2007-2008), OEF X (2009-2010), and OEF XII (2012). As part of force reductions, 2-321 was inactivated on 14 May 2014.

== Lineage and honors ==
=== Lineage ===
- Constituted 5 August 1917 in the National Army as Battery B, 321st Field Artillery, and element of the 82d Division
- Organized 2 September 1917 at Camp Gordon, Georgia
- Demobilized 26 May 1919 at Camp Dix, New Jersey
- Reconstituted 5 June 1930 in the Organized Reserves; concurrently, consolidated with Battery B, 321st Field Artillery (active) (constituted in July 1923 in the Organized Reserves as Battery B, 452d Field Artillery and organized in Georgia; redesignated 5 October 1929 as Battery B, 321st Field Artillery, an element of the 82d Division), and consolidated unit designated as Battery B, 321st Field Artillery, and element of the 82d Division.
- Reorganized and redesignated 13 February 1942 as Battery B, 321st Field Artillery Battalion
- Ordered into active military service 25 March 1942 and reorganized at Camp Claiborne, Louisiana
- Reorganized and redesignated 15 August 1942 as Battery B, 321st Glider Field Artillery Battalion, an element of the 101st Airborne Division
- Inactivated 30 November 1945 in Germany

(Organized Reserves redesignated 25 March 1948 as the Organized Reserve Corps)

- Redesignated 18 June 1948 as Battery B, 518th Airborne Field Artillery Battalion
- Withdrawn 25 June 1958 from the Organized Reserve Corps and allotted to the Regular Army
- Activated 6 July 1948 at Camp Breckinridge, Kentucky
- Inactivated 1 April 1949 at Camp Breckinridge, Kentucky
- Activated 25 August 1950 at Camp Breckinridge, Kentucky
- Inactivated 1 December 1953 at Camp Breckinridge, Kentucky
- Activated 15 May 1954 at Fort Jackson, South Carolina
- Redesignated 1 July 1956 as Battery B, 321st Airborne Field Artillery Battalion
- Reorganized and redesignated 25 April 1957 as Battery B, 321st Artillery, an element of the 101st Airborne Division
- Relieved 1 February 1964 from assignment to the 101st Airborne Division and assigned to the 82d Airborne Division
- Reorganized and redesignated 25 May 1964 as Headquarters, Headquarters and Service Battery, 2d Battalion, 321st Artillery (organic element constituted 6 March 1964 and activated 25 May 1964)
- Redesignated 1 September 1971 as the 2d Battalion, 321st Field Artillery
- Inactivated 2 October 1986 at Fort Bragg, North Carolina, and relieved from Assignment to the 82d Airborne Division
- Redesignated 1 October 2005 as the 2d Battalion, 321st Field Artillery Regiment
- Assigned 16 June 2006 to the 4th Brigade Combat Team, 82d Airborne Division and activated at Fort Bragg, North Carolina
- Inactivated 15 May 2014 at Fort Bragg, North Carolina

=== Campaign participation credit ===
- World War I: St. Mihiel; Meuse-Argonne; Lorraine 1918
- World War II: Normandy (with arrowhead); Rhineland (with arrowhead); Ardennes-Alsace; Central Europe
- Vietnam: Tet Counteroffensive; Counteroffensive, Phase IV; Counteroffensive, Phase V; Counteroffensive, Phase VI; Tet 69/Counteroffensive; Summer-Fall 1969; Winter-Spring 1970
- Armed Forces Expeditions: Dominican Republic
- Global War on Terrorism
  - Afghanistan: Consolidation II, Consolidation III; Transition I

Note: The published US Army lineage lists no War on Terrorism campaigns, as of 17 August 2006. Comparison of the battalion's deployment dates with War on Terrorism campaigns estimates that the battalion is entitled to credit for participation in the 3 campaigns listed.

=== Decorations ===
- Presidential Unit Citation (Army), Streamer embroidered BASTOGNE
- French Croix de Guerre with Palm, World War II for NORMANDY
- Netherlands Orange Lanyard
- Belgian Fourragere 1940
  - Cited in the Order of the Day of the Belgian Army for action in France and Belgium
- Belgian Croix de Guerre 1940 with Palm for BASTOGNE; cited in the Order of the Day of the Belgian Army for action at Bastogne
- Republic of Vietnam Cross of Gallantry with Palm for VIETNAM 1968-1969
- Republic of Vietnam Civil Action Honor Medal, First Class for VIETNAM 1968

Batteries A and B each additionally entitled to:
- Valorous Unit Award for HUE and SAIGON

== Heraldry ==
=== Distinctive unit insignia ===
321st Field Artillery Regiment Distinctive Unit Insignia

=== Coat of arms ===
321st Field Artillery Regiment Coat of Arms

== See also ==
- 321st Field Artillery Regiment
