= Jecca Craig =

British environmental conservationist

Jessica Craig
- Born: Jessica Elizabeth Craig; Taunton, England, UK
- Other name: Jecca Craig
- Education: University College London (BA); University College London (MSc)
- Spouse: Jonathan Baillie (m. 2016)
- Children: 2
- Scientific career
- Workplaces: Panthera; Stop Ivory

Jessica Elizabeth Craig, known as Jecca Craig, is a British environmental conservationist and doctoral student at University College London. She helped found Panthera, the world's largest wildcat conservation organization and Stop Ivory, an independent NGO aiming to protect elephant and stop the trade in ivory. She is currently completing a doctorate on the use of remote camera traps and other technology to monitor and manage protected areas.

== Early life ==
Her family formerly ran a cattle ranch at Lewa in Kenya; her father Ian Craig founded the Ngare Sergoi Rhino Sanctuary on the family's land, and went on to found the Lewa Wildlife Conservancy, which incorporated the original sanctuary.

Jessica is a former girlfriend of the Prince of Wales. In October 2008, she became engaged to Hugh Crossley, a director at the investment company Equitix, but they separated in October 2009. In April 2015, she became engaged to Canadian professor Jonathan Baillie, director of conservation at the Zoological Society of London. Craig married Jonathan Baillie on Saturday, 26 March 2016 at her family estate at Lewa with the Prince of Wales, then Duke of Cambridge, as one of the guests.
