= Charles B. Lawrence (judge) =

American judge

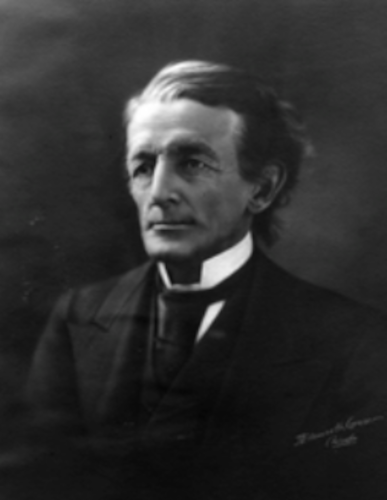
Lawrence's portrait at the Illinois Supreme Court.

Charles Brush Lawrence (December 17, 1820 – April 9, 1883) was an American jurist.

Born in Vergennes, Vermont, Lawrence received his bachelor's degree from Union College in 1841. Lawrence served as an Illinois circuit court judge. From 1864 until 1873, Lawrence served on the Illinois Supreme Court and was chief justice of the court. He lived in Galesburg, Illinois. Lawrence died in Decatur, Alabama.
