= Alfred M. Craig =

American judge

Alfred Marion Craig
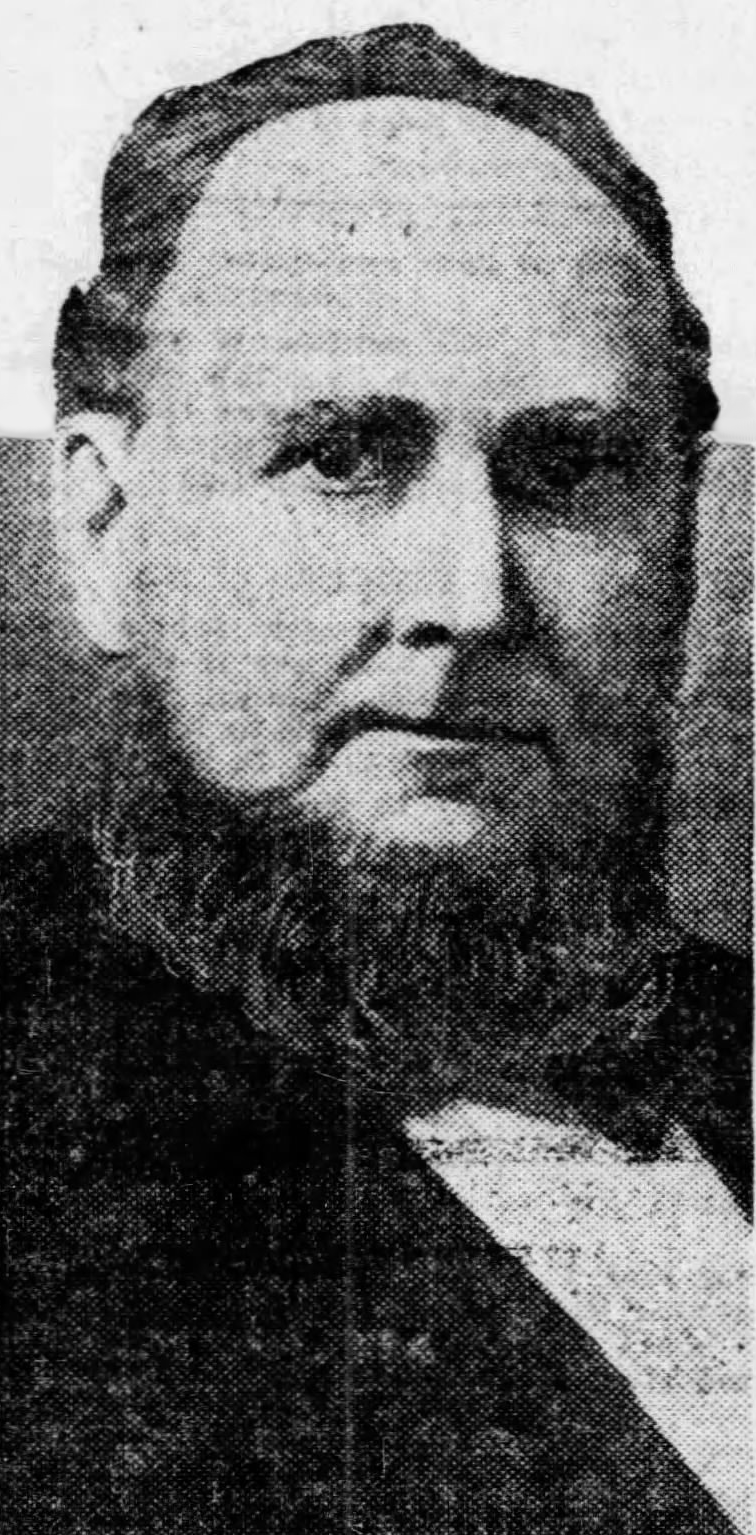

Justice of the Supreme Court of Illinois
- In office 1873–1900
- Preceded by: Charles B. Lawrence
- Succeeded by: John P. Hand

Personal details
- Born: January 15, 1832 Paris, Illinois
- Died: September 6, 1911 (aged 79) Galesburg, Illinois
- Party: Democratic

Alfred Marion Craig (January 15, 1832 – September 6, 1911) was an American judge from Illinois. Born and raised in the state, he was first elected as Knox County judge before he was named to the Illinois Supreme Court in 1873. Craig served three nine-year terms there, as Chief Justice four times.

== Biography ==
He was born on January 15, 1832, in Paris, Illinois, the son of David and Mintie Craig. He attended public schools and Knox College, graduating in 1853. He moved to Lewistown and studied law under Hezekiah H. Weed and William C. Goudy. Craig was admitted to the bar in 1855 and moved to Knoxville to form the law firm of Manning, Douglas & Craig.

In 1864, Craig was elected as Knox County judge. He formed a new practice with his brother-in-law C. K. Harvey in 1868. Craig represented Knoxville in the unsuccessful legal battle to remain the county seat of Knox County. He lost an election to the Illinois House of Representatives in 1868 and an election to the Illinois Senate two years later. As one of the foremost judges in the area affiliated with the Democratic Party, Craig was nominated to challenge the Republican Justice Charles B. Lawrence for a seat on the Illinois Supreme Court in 1873. Craig's bid was successful. He was re-elected in 1882, defeating John Davis McCulloch, and again in 1891, defeating Henry W. Wells. He was named Chief Justice, then a one-year position, in 1878, 1881, 1888 and 1895. He wrote the opinion of Illinois Central Railroad v. Illinois, a case later taken up by the Supreme Court of the United States.

Craig was often coveted for political candidacy, but he refused all offers. Grover Cleveland considered Craig to fill the Chief Justice vacancy on the Supreme Court of the United States, but he instead chose to name Melville Fuller. Outside of his law interests, Craig also had large landholdings. He was the president of the Banks of Galesburg and the Bank of Altoona, and was a director of the First National Bank of Knoxville.

Craig married Elizabeth Harvey on August 4, 1857. They had three children, one of whom, Charles C. Craig, also sat on the Illinois Supreme Court. He died in Galesburg on September 6, 1911, from pneumonia and was buried in Hope Cemetery.
