= Joseph Craig =

Joseph Craig may refer to:

- Joseph A. Craig High School, a public high school in Janesville, Wisconsin, named after Joseph A. Craig, who was instrumental in attracting the General Motors Janesville Assembly plant to the city
- Joe Craig (baseball) (1918–1991), American Negro leagues baseball player
- Joe Craig (footballer) (born 1954), former Scottish footballer
- Joe Craig (writer) (born 1981), British writer
- Joe Craig (Canadian football) (born 1992), Canadian football wide receiver
