= William Craig (businessman) =

Scottish businessman (c. 1903–1972)

- Born: William Slater Gold Craig c. 1903; Scotland
- Died: 1972 (aged 69)
- Occupation: Businessman
- Years active: 1921–unknown
- Known for: Founding West Coast Motors
- Relatives: Jack Craig (brother); David Craig (brother)

William Slater Gold Craig (c. 1903–1972) was a Scottish businessman. In 1921, with his brother Jack, he established West Coast Motor Service Company. It is still in business today as West Coast Motors.

== Life and career ==
After serving as a pilot in the Royal Flying Corps during World War I, his brother, Jack, settled in Campbeltown, Argyll, in 1919. William joined him shortly thereafter.

In 1920, with the addition of third brother, David, the Craig Brothers Motor Engineers garage opened in Longrow in Campbeltown. They later began a business of hiring out passenger-carrying vehicles.

A regular bus service between Campbeltown and Tarbet began in 1921 under the business name of West Coast Motor Service Company (WCMS). It was at this point that a third partner, David Sommerville, joined the company.

The garage name was changed to County Garage in 1923.

A return service from Tarbet to Campbeltown was established in 1925, at which point David moved to Tarbet to manage the route. He moved again two years later, when the route's starting point was moved to Lochgilphead.

In 1935, Craig arranged for West Coast Motors Service to deliver the Royal Mail's letters and parcels on an overnight service between Glasgow and Campbeltown, instead of via steamship. Newspapers were added to the service in 1936. The service continued until 2011.

The Craigs purchased Benmore distillery in 1936, and moved WCMS into the premises. They changed the name of the premises to Benmhor, which remains today.

== Death ==
Craig died in 1972, aged 69. The business passed to R. H. Craig and William G. Craig. As of 2008, Craig's grandson Ian Craig was the company's chief executive, with his brother Colin being the managing director.
