= Ann Craig =

British artist

- Occupation: Silversmith

Ann Craig was an English silversmith.

Recorded as a largeworker, Craig was the wife of silversmith John Craig. He died around 1735, and on 15 October 1740 she registered her own mark. She was active until around 1745, working in partnership with John Neville. Her address was the corner of Norris Street, St James's, Haymarket; her husband had previously been in partnership with George Wickes at the same location. Among her customers with Neville was Robert Howard, Bishop of Elphin.

Craig and Neville were the makers of a George II saucepan, dating to 1742, in the collection of the National Museum of Women in the Arts.
