= Sir James Henry Craig (1811 Quebec City ship) =

History

United Kingdom
- Name: Sir James Henry Craig
- Namesake: General Sir James Henry Craig
- Builder: Bell & Robitaille, Quebec
- Launched: 1811
- Fate: Lost 4 December 1829

General characteristics
- Tons burthen: 250, or 262, or 268, or 286 (bm)
- Length: 94 ft (29 m)
- Beam: 26 ft (7.9 m)
- Armament: 6 × 18-pounder carronades

Sir James Henry Craig (or Sir James H. Craig) was launched in Quebec in 1811. She first appeared in Lloyd's Register (LR) in 1813 and then spent much of her career sailing between Britain and Canada. She was lost on 4 December 1829.

Year	Master	Owner	Trade	Source & notes
1813	R.Baxter	Hall & Co.	Falmouth transport	LR
1815	R.Baxter	Hall & Co.	Falmouth transport	LR
1815	Davison	Johnson	London transport	Register of Shipping
1816	R.Baxter; Selkrig	Hall & Co. Johnston	Falmouth transport	LR
1818	R.Selkrig; Eddington	Johnson	London–Jamaica; London−Riga	LR
1819	Eddington; J.Diese	Johnson	London–Riga; Leith–Quebec	LR;

On 7 May 1819, Sir J.H.Craig, Dease, master, arrived at Quebec after a six-week voyage from Leith. She had sailed in ballast.

On 15 July 1820, Sir J.H.Craig, James Dease, master, arrived at Quebec after a 54-day voyage from Leith. She brought 100 settlers.

Year	Master	Owner	Trade	Source & notes
1821	J.Diese; M.Craig	Johnson & Co.	London–Quebec; Leith–Memel	LR; damages repaired 1819, and small repairs 1821
1825	M.Craig	Captain	Leith–Richibucto	LR; damages repaired 1819, and small repairs 1821 & 1823
1826	M.Craig; Kinghorn	Johnson	Leith–Richibucto	LR; damages repaired 1819, small repairs 1821 & 1823, and thorough repair 1825
1829	Kinghorn; D.Johnson	Swan & Co.	Dublin	LR; damages repaired 1819, small repairs 1821 & 1823, and thorough repair 1825
1831	D.Johnson	Johnson & Co.	Dublin-Miramichi, New Brunswick	LR; thorough repair 1825

== Fate ==
By one report she was lost on 4 December 1829. She was last listed in 1831 with stale data.
