= Michael Craig =

Michael or Mike Craig may refer to:

- Michael Craig (actor) (born 1929), Indian-born British retired actor
- Michael Craig (footballer, born 1977), former Aberdeen FC player
- Michael Craig (footballer, born 2003), Reading FC player
- Michael Craig (squash player) (born 1996), Northern Irish squash player
- Michael Earl Craig (born 1970), American poet
- Mike Craig (field hockey) (1931–2023), Australian Olympic hockey player
- Mike Craig (ice hockey, born 1962), Canadian ice hockey goaltender
- Mike Craig (ice hockey, born 1971), Canadian ice hockey winger who played in the NHL
- Mikey Craig (born 1960), British musician
