= Richard Craig =

Richard Craig may refer to:

- Richard Craig (politician)
- Richard Craig (adventurer)
- Richard Craig (priest)
