= John Wylde (lawyer) =

Scottish advocate and antiquarian

John Wylde FRSE (or Wild; c. 1760 – 6 February 1840) was a Scottish advocate, academic and antiquarian. He was Professor of Civil Law at the University of Edinburgh.

== Life ==
He was born in Edinburgh the son of John Wild, a tobacconist on the Royal Mile at the head of Fleshmarket Close.

He was educated at the Edinburgh High School (then south of the Cowgate). He then studied law at the University of Edinburgh. He qualified as an advocate in 1785.

In 1788 he was elected a Fellow of the Royal Society of Edinburgh. His proposers were Andrew Dalzell, John Hill, and John Clerk, Lord Eldin.

In 1790 he was living at North Castle Street in Edinburgh's New Town, then a newly built townhouse.

In 1792 he became Joint Professor of Civil Law at the University of Edinburgh along with Robert Dick, and in 1796 full Professor. He then moved to 5 College Street next to Old College. He retired in 1800 due to mental health issues. He was succeeded by Alexander Irving.

He died on 6 February 1840.

== Family ==
He is thought to be father of the mid-19th century Edinburgh lawyer Robert Wyld WS.
