= James Thomson Gibson-Craig =

Scottish book collector (1799–1886)

James Thomson Gibson-Craig WS FRSE (12 March 1799 – 18 July 1886) was a Scottish book collector and writer to the Signet.

== Early life, education, and career ==
Gibson-Craig was born on 12 March 1799 as the second son of James Gibson (1765–1850), and his wife Anne (d. 1837), née Thomson; his father was a Clerk of the Signet and had married Anne in 1796. He double-barrelled his name with "Craig" on royal license in 1823, and was created a baronet in 1831. His elder brother and father's heir, William Gibson-Craig, 2nd Baronet, became a notable Member of Parliament and advocate.

Gibson-Craig attended the Royal High School at the University of Edinburgh. In 1824, he was admitted writer to the Signet. Gibson-Craig was apprenticed under his father and practiced as a partner in the firm J. T. Gibson-Craig, Dalziel, and Brodies.

== Antiquarian tastes ==
In Edinburgh, Gibson-Craig ingratiated himself into the city's cultivated circles, gathering over antiquarian, literary, and artistic topics. He made his acquaintance with such figures as Walter Scott, Thomas Babington Macaulay, Henry Cockburn, Lord Cockburn, Alexander Jeffrey, Charles Kirkpatrick Sharpe, David Laing, Henry Raeburn, and William Fettes Douglas. He was a very early member of the Bannatyne Club in 1823, a Scottish antiquarian group dedicated to publishing rare Scottish texts. On 1 March 1830, Gibson-Craig was elected a Fellow of the Royal Society of Edinburgh, on the proposal of Andrew Duncan, the younger, a society which his brother had joined the previous year.

Gibson-Craig was a keen antiquarian, and compiled an extensive library, including several French and Scottish books with gold-tooled bindings. In an 1871 sale, he purchased the Murthly Hours, a 13th-century French book of hours, brought to Scotland in the 15th century, and annotated in Scottish Gaelic. Shortly after this purchase, Gibson-Craig brought the manuscript to the British Museum, where he showed it to the keeper of manuscripts, Edward Augustus Bond, who speculated on its date and origins.

He presented an edition of Papers Relative to the Marriage of King James the Sixth of Scotland, with the Princess Anna of Denmark: A.D. MDLXXXIX, and the Form and Manner of Her Majesty's Coronation at Holyroodhouse, A.D. MDXC, to the Bannatyne Club in 1828. He also sponsored the publication of a facsimile edition of his ancestor, John Craig's, Short Summe of the Whole Catechisme (1581), which was published with a biography of Craig by Thomas Graves Law. In a private issue of 25 copies, Gibson-Craig produced a facsimile edition of several bookbindings in his father's collection in 1828, Fac-Similes of Old Bookbinding in the Collection of James Gibson Craig.

== Personal life ==
On 23 November 1841, he married Jane, the daughter of John Peter Grant of Rothiemurchus and widow of Colonel Gervaise Pennington. The couple had no children. Politically, Gibson-Craig followed his father as a Whig. Jane predeceased her husband on 25 April 1863, and James died on 18 July 1886, in Edinburgh.

After his death, Gibson-Craig's will was confirmed at £68,789 5s 7d, and his library was auctioned off. The auction of 9674 lots from his library occurred at Sotheby's, over the course of twenty-eight days between 27 June 1887 and 17 November 1888, eventually raising as much as £15,509 4s 6d. Among these manuscripts sold, was the Murthly Hours. At Dowells, Edinburgh, his Scottish manuscripts were sold off in 1887. At Christie's, over three sales, some art from Gibson-Craig's collection was auctioned off in April 1887.
