= Charles C. Craig =

American judge (1865–1944)

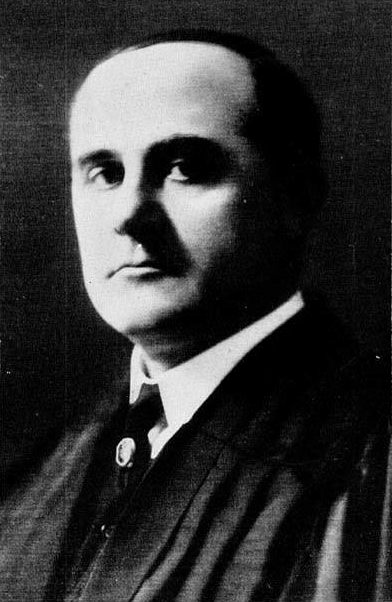
Craig's official photograph, c. 1917.

Charles Curtis Craig (June 16, 1865 – August 25, 1944) was an American jurist, served on the Illinois Supreme Court, and was a politician.

Born in Knoxville, Illinois, Craig went to Knox College and the United States Naval Academy. He studied law at Illinois Wesleyan University and with the Stevenson and Ewing Law Firm in Bloomington, Illinois and was admitted to the Illinois bar in 1885. His father was Alfred M. Craig who also served on the Illinois Supreme Court.

Craig served in the Illinois National Guard during the Spanish–American War. Craig practiced law in Galesburg, Illinois and served as state's attorney for Knox County, Illinois as a Democrat. He served in the Illinois House of Representatives from 1899 to 1903. Craig served on the Illinois Supreme Court from 1913 to 1918. Craig died at his home in Galesburg, Illinois.
