= Daniel Frank Craig =

United States Army officer (1875–1929)

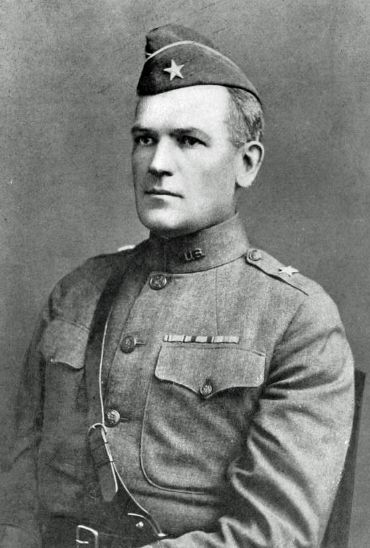
- From 1919's The 302nd Field Artillery, United States Army
- Born: 3 October 1875; Mahaska County, Iowa, U.S.
- Died: 17 April 1929 (aged 53) Cranston, Rhode Island, U.S.
- Buried: Arlington National Cemetery
- Allegiance: United States
- Branch: United States Army
- Rank: Brigadier General
- Conflicts: Occupation of Veracruz; Pancho Villa Expedition; World War I
- Awards: Army Distinguished Service Medal; Silver Plaque (France)

Daniel Frank Craig (3 October 1875 – 17 April 1929) was a United States Army officer. He served in a number of U.S. military conflicts including in the Philippines, Mexico and World War I.

== Early life ==
Craig was born on 3 October 1875 in Mahaska County near Oskaloosa, Iowa, to Samuel Craig and Sarah Jane (Stirlen) Craig.

== Military career ==
On 18 May 1898 Craig became first lieutenant of the 20th Kansas Infantry, advancing to captain the following year. Not long after being honorably discharged on 12 June 1899, he was recommissioned as captain of the 36th United States Volunteer Infantry, where he served until being honorably mustered out on 16 March 1901. Craig was commissioned second lieutenant of the Artillery Corps on 8 May 1901, promoted to first lieutenant on 28 July 1903 and again promoted to captain, this time of the Fourth Field Artillery Brigade, on 25 Jan 1907. During this time Craig served in the Philippines between 1898 and 1901 and 1904–1907. Craig later served in Mexico at Veracruz (1914) and in the Punitive Expedition against Pancho Villa (1916). After serving in Mexico, Craig became part of the General Staff Corps on 25 Nov 1916, acting as chief of staff of the 12th Infantry Division until becoming the assistant chief of staff of the Southern Department on 24 March 1917. He later become part of the War College Division as General Staff in Washington, D.C., from April to June 1917, during which he was promoted to major on 15 May 1917. In August 1917 he went to France as a colonel in the National Army. During World War I, Craig served as a commanding officer of various artillery brigades, ultimately becoming brigadier general in October 1918. He commanded the 302nd Field Artillery Regiment, 151st Brigade, 76th Division and the 157th Field Artillery Brigade in 1918 and later the 158th, 2nd and 5th Field Artillery Brigades in 1919. For his service during the war, Craig received the Army Distinguished Service Medal and a French Silver Plaque.

== Personal life and education ==
Craig married to Florence Elizabeth Burt on 19 May 1906. He was a graduate of the Mounted Service School in 1910, the School of the Line (now the United States Army Command and General Staff College) in 1912, and the United States Army War College in 1916. Craig was an Episcopalian and Freemason, including a member of the Shriners.

In retirement, Craig lived in Garnett, Kansas. He died in Cranston, Rhode Island, on April 17 1929, while on an automobile tour of the New England states. Craig was buried at Arlington National Cemetery.
