= James Henry Craig =

British Army officer and colonial administrator (1748–1812

General Sir James Henry Craig KB
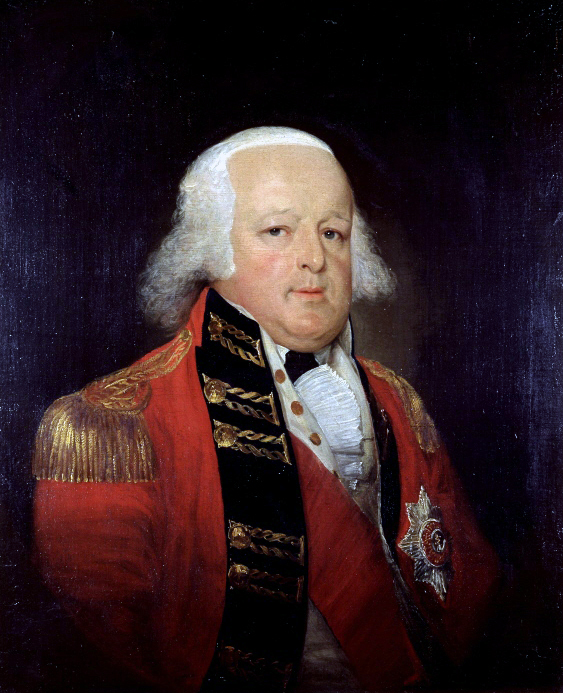
- Portrait by Thomas Lawrence, c. 1806–1807
- Born: 1748; Gibraltar
- Died: 12 January 1812 (aged 63); London, England
- Military career
- Allegiance: Great Britain; United Kingdom
- Branch: British Army
- Service years: 1763–1812
- Rank: General
- Conflicts: American War of Independence; Battle of Bunker Hill; Battle of Quebec (1775); Battle of Trois-Rivières; Saratoga campaign; Battle of Ticonderoga (1777); Battle of Hubbardton; Battles of Saratoga; Penobscot Expedition; Southern theater of the American Revolutionary War; French Revolutionary Wars; Invasion of the Cape Colony; Napoleonic Wars; Anglo-Russian invasion of Naples
- Awards: Knight of the Order of the Bath

General Sir James Henry Craig KB (1748 – 12 January 1812) was a British Army officer and colonial administrator who served as the governor general of British North America from 1807 to 1811.

== Early life and military service ==
Craig came from a Scottish family whose father was a judge of the civil and military courts in Gibraltar. At the age of 15 in 1763 he was enrolled as an ensign in the 30th (Cambridgeshire) Regiment of Foot. Colonel Robert Boyd, the lieutenant governor of Gibraltar in 1770 endorsed his promotion to an aide-de-camp which allowed him to later take command of a company in the 47th (Lancashire) Regiment of Foot stationed in the American colonies.

== Service during the American War of Independence ==
After the outbreak of the War of Independence in 1775, Craig took part in the Battle of Bunker Hill, where he was badly wounded, but refused to leave his regiment, and participated in the defence of Quebec in 1776, where he met the American invaders at Trois-Rivières while commanding the advance guard that forced them back beyond the border.

During 1777, he was wounded twice, once seriously, during engagements at Fort Ticonderoga, Hubbardton, and Freeman's Farm. Major-General John Burgoyne, who expressed high regard for Craig as an officer, recommended him for the rank of a major in the 82nd Regiment of Foot (1777) in recognition of his service.

From 1778 to 1781 Craig served with the 82nd Regiment in Nova Scotia, at Penobscot, and later in North Carolina. Due to constant involvement in operations during the war, Craig usually led light infantry troops.

== Service during the Napoleonic Wars ==
After promotion to lieutenant-colonel in 1781, Craig became Lieutenant Governor of Guernsey in 1793 and then an adjutant general to the Duke of York in the 1794 Army of Netherlands, being promoted to major-general.

In 1794–1795, the Netherlands were overrun by the revolutionary armies of the new republic of France, and Stadtholder Prince William V of Orange became a refugee in England. A British force under General Sir James Craig set out to Cape Town to secure the colony against the French. The Battle of Muizenberg successfully wrested control from William V of Orange to Britain.

In 1795 he served with Vice-Admiral Viscount Keith and Major-General Alured Clarke in occupying the Cape Colony from the Dutch Republic where he became governor of the new possession, and remained in that posting until 1797, for which he received the Order of the Bath. In the same year Craig sailed to Madras, and saw combat in the Bengal region of India for which he was again promoted to lieutenant-general in January 1801. Craig returned to England to serve for three years as the commander of the Eastern District.

In 1805, despite poor health, he was appointed to lead the Anglo-Russian invasion of Naples, but after a brief occupation, the mission was aborted after the news of Austrian defeat at the Battle of Ulm.

== Service in Canada ==
Craig concurrently held the positions of Governor-General of British North America and lieutenant-governor of Lower Canada from 1807 to 1811. Craig considered measures such as creating English counties and replacing the legislative assembly with an appointed government as a means of increasing the power of English speakers in predominantly French Lower Canada. He tried to encourage immigration from Britain and the United States in hopes of making the French a minority.

In 1809, he employed a former U.S. Army officer named John Henry to determine if the Federalist New England states desired seceding from the United States and returning to their former states as Crown colonies. The British did not pursue re-acquiring New England and, after Henry unsuccessfully sought to be rewarded for his efforts, Henry sold the correspondence to President James Madison for $50,000 and sailed for France. (See Henry letters.)

== See also ==
- List of governors general of Canada
- List of lieutenant governors of Quebec
- Sir John Thomas Jones
- Sir James Henry Craig (ship)

== Sources ==
- Flayhart, William Henry (2004). Counterpoint to Trafalgar : the Anglo-Russian invasion of Naples, 1805-1806. New Perspectives on Maritime History and Nautical Archaeology. Gainesville: University Press of Florida. ISBN 0-8130-2795-0. OCLC 55625407.
- Christie, Robert (1818). The military and naval operations in the Canadas, during the late war with the United States. Including also the political history of Lower-Canada during the administrations of Sir James Henry Craig and Sir George Prevost; from the year 1807 until the year 1815. Quebec. OCLC 3765786. Re-printed by Oram and Mott, New York

Military offices
Preceded by Thomas Dundas	Lieutenant Governor of Guernsey; 1793	Succeeded by John Small
Preceded by Sir Alured Clarke	Commander-in-Chief, India; 1801	Succeeded by Gerald Lake
Preceded by Charles Hamilton	Governor of Blackness Castle; 1806–1812	Succeeded by Sir Rowland Hill
Preceded by Alexander Mackenzie Fraser	Colonel of the 78th (Highlanders) Regiment of Foot; 1809–1812	Succeeded by Sir Samuel Auchmuty
Preceded by John Graves Simcoe	Colonel of the 22nd (the Cheshire) Regiment of Foot; 1806–1809	Succeeded by Edward Finch
Preceded by William Grinfield	Colonel of the 86th (the Shropshire Volunteers); 1804–1806	Succeeded by Sir Charles Ross
Preceded by Sir John Vaughan	Colonel of the 46th (South Devonshire) Regiment of Foot; 1795–1804	Succeeded by John Whyte
Government offices
Preceded by Thomas Dunn	Governor General of British North America; 1807–1811	Succeeded by Sir George Prevost
