= Balanced budget amendment =

Constitutional provision

A balanced budget amendment or debt brake is a constitutional rule requiring that a state cannot spend more than its income. It requires a balance between the projected receipts and expenditures of the government, and the balance requirement may be for each fiscal year or over a multi-year period.

Balanced-budget provisions have been added to the constitutions of Germany, Hong Kong, Italy, Poland, Slovenia, Spain and Switzerland, among others, as well as to the constitutions of most U.S. states. In the United States, proposals for balanced budget amendments to the United States Constitution have often had bipartisan support but have become more associated with the Republican Party in the 21st century. In 1995, such an amendment passed the US House and came within one vote of passing the Senate.

Balanced budget amendments are defended with arguments that they reduce deficit spending and constrain politicians from making irresponsible short-term spending decisions when they are in office. Research shows that balanced budget amendments lead to greater fiscal discipline. However, there is substantial agreement among economists that strict annual balanced budget amendments have harmful near-term economic effects. In times of recession, deficit spending has significant benefits, whereas spending cuts by governments aggravate and lengthen recessions.

To prevent that, most balanced-budget provisions make an exception for times of war, national emergency, or recession, or allow the legislature to suspend the rule by a supermajority vote. Alternatively, some balanced budget requirements and proposals target multi-year balance instead of annual balance. Structural balance—balance over the medium term—avoids the pro-cyclical features of an annual balance requirement and may allow adjustments for automatic changes in benefits programs known as automatic stabilizers.

== Europe ==
=== Austria ===
In November 2011, the Austrian coalition government tried to amend its constitution and introduce a German style Schuldenbremse ("debt brake"). This would have forced the government to reduce its debt level to 60% of gross domestic product (GDP) by 2020. However, the government failed to gain a two-thirds majority in support of the constitutional amendment. Another attempt was made in October 2019, which was also unsuccessful.

=== Denmark ===
Local and regional authorities in Denmark are not allowed to run deficits and must always balance their budgets. There is no such rule for the national government, which has no limits on debt beyond the common rules of the European Union. Danish debt is very low in international comparison and stands at 33% of GDP in 2019.

=== France ===
Article 34 of the Constitution was amended in 2008 to include the objective of balancing the public sector accounts. In 2012, France passed a new law (2012–1403), creating the independent High Council of Public Finances, giving it the responsibility to report on the sustainability and deviation from planned targets of public spending.

=== Germany ===
In 2009, Germany's constitution was amended to introduce the Schuldenbremse ("debt brake"), a balanced budget provision. This applies to both the federal government and the Länder (German states). From 2016 onwards, the federal government was forbidden to run a structural deficit of more than 0.35% of GDP. Since 2020, the states have not been permitted to run any structural deficit at all. The Basic Law permits an exception to be made for emergencies such as a natural disaster or severe economic crisis. The Federal government also used off-budget funds (Sondervermögen) to circumvent the brake rule. The debt brake has been criticized for low flexibility.

=== Italy ===
In 2011, Italian Prime Minister Silvio Berlusconi promised to balance the budget by 2013, and a balanced budget amendment to the Constitution of Italy was added in 2012 with an overwhelming parliamentary majority, under the following Monti government. Under the amended Constitution, deficit spending can still take place in the event of emergencies, but only if authorized by a majority of the entire membership in both houses of Parliament. In practice, the term "emergency" has been loosely interpreted, and Parliament has always authorized the borrowing of new debt; Italy has not yet had a balanced budget since the passage of the amendment.

=== Poland ===
Poland's constitution (adopted in 1997) caps the public debt at 60% of GDP – the government cannot take on any financial obligations that would cause that limit to be exceeded. To ensure this level is never breached, Poland has a self-imposed debt threshold of 55% of GDP, and the government must take action to balance the budget once this level is exceeded.

=== Slovenia ===
In 2013, the Slovenian parliament approved a balanced budget amendment to the constitution that came into force in 2015.

=== Spain ===
In 2011, the Spanish Parliament proposed a law amending the Spanish Constitution to require a balanced budget at both the national and regional level by 2020. The law states that public debt cannot exceed 60% of GDP, though exceptions would be made in case of a natural catastrophe, economic recession, or other emergencies. The changes will also require the government to stick to EU annual deficit limits of 3% of GDP.

=== Sweden ===
The Swedish government is obliged to run a budget surplus of at least 1% of GDP on average over a business cycle. In 2019, this goal was temporarily lowered to 0.33% of GDP. The overall debt must not be above 35% of GDP. This rule includes all levels of government, including local authorities.

=== Switzerland ===
After years of rising deficits and debt in the 1990s, Switzerland's citizens adopted the debt brake as a constitutional amendment in 2001. The rule was implemented starting in 2003. It states that each year, the budget must be in balance, adjusted for economic conditions. This adjustment is made by multiplying expenditures by a cyclical factor (the ratio of trend real GDP to expected real GDP), thus either allowing for deficits during recessions or forcing lawmakers to have surpluses during booms. Essentially, the rule calls for structural balance in each year and absolute balance over the course of a business cycle. So if lawmakers want to have expansionary fiscal policy during recessions, they need to pay for it by saving up during good economic times. The rule did initially allow for "extraordinary spending" if a qualified parliamentary majority approved, but recent changes have made this spending count as normal expenditures.

== United States ==
=== U.S. states ===
Every U.S. state other than Vermont has some form of balanced budget provision that applies to its operating budget. The precise form of this provision varies from state to state. Indiana has a state debt prohibition with an exception for "temporary and casual deficits," but no balanced budget requirement. The governor is not legally required to submit a balanced budget, the legislature is not required to approve appropriations that are within available revenue, and the state is not required to end the year in balance. An unusual variant is the Oregon kicker, which bans surpluses of more than 2% of revenue by refunding the money to the taxpayers. State balanced budget requirements do not apply to state capital budgets, which generally allow states to use their debt capacity to finance long-term expenditures such as transportation and other infrastructure.

=== U.S. federal government ===
There is no balanced budget provision in the U.S. Constitution, so the federal government is not required to have a balanced budget and Congress usually does not pass one. Several proposed amendments to the U.S. Constitution would require a balanced budget. Most of these proposed amendments allow a supermajority to waive the requirement of a balanced budget in times of war, national emergency, or recession.

==== History ====
The Articles of Confederation and the Perpetual Union had granted to the Continental Congress the power

to borrow money, or emit bills on the credit of the United States, transmitting every half-year to the respective States an account of the sums of money so borrowed or emitted

And, with this as a model Article I, Section 8, Clause 2 of the Constitution grants to the United States Congress the power

To borrow money on the credit of the United States;

At the time that the Constitution came into effect, the United States had a significant debt, primarily associated with the Revolutionary War. There were differences within and between the major political coalitions over the possible liquidation or increase of this debt. As early as 1798, Thomas Jefferson wrote:

I wish it were possible to obtain a single amendment to our Constitution. I would be willing to depend on that alone for the reduction of the administration of our government; I mean an additional article taking from the Federal Government the power of borrowing. I now deny their power of making paper money or anything else a legal tender. I know that to pay all proper expenses within the year would, in a case of war, be hard on us. But not so hard as ten wars instead of one. For wars could be reduced in that proportion; besides that, the State governments would be free to lend their credit in borrowing quotas.

(Although Jefferson made a point of seeking a balanced budget during the early years of his administration, he seems to have later reversed himself in purchasing the Louisiana Territory. He made no exception for war, but rather saw the requirement of maintaining a balanced budget as a salutary deterrent.)

The issue of the federal debt was next addressed by the Constitution within Section 4 of the Fourteenth Amendment (proposed on June 13, 1866, and ratified on July 9, 1868):

The validity of the public debt of the United States, authorized by law, including debts incurred for payment of pensions and bounties for services in suppressing insurrection or rebellion, shall not be questioned. But neither the United States nor any State shall assume or pay any debt or obligation incurred in aid of insurrection or rebellion against the United States, or any claim for the loss or emancipation of any slave; but all such debts, obligation, and claims shall be held illegal and void.

One of the earliest Balanced Budget Amendment proposals presented in Congress was that of Senator Millard Tydings, who introduced Senate Joint Resolution 36, a resolution in support of a Constitutional Amendment that would have taken away some of the flexibility the U.S. Treasury had accrued with respect to debt management by proposing to prohibit appropriations in excess of revenues in the absence of a new debt authorization and require that any new debt be liquidated over a 15-year period.

On May 4, 1936, Representative Harold Knutson (R-Minnesota) introduced House Joint Resolution 579, resolution in support of a Constitutional Amendment that would have placed a per capita ceiling on the federal debt in peacetime.

Article V of the Constitution specifies that if the legislatures of two-thirds of the states apply to Congress for a constitutional amendment by means of an amendment-proposing convention, then Congress must call that convention. A total of 44 states have submitted applications for a balanced budget amendment, at some time in the past. However, they were not outstanding simultaneously as some have expired or been rescinded. As of 27 December 2016, there were 28 outstanding applications according to the Balanced Budget Amendment Task Force which advocates for such an amendment. On 24 February 2017, Wyoming became the 29th state to call for a convention to pass a balanced budget amendment.

==== Deficit spending ====
Unlike the constitutions of most U.S. states, the United States Constitution does not require the United States Congress to pass a balanced budget, one in which the projected income to the government through taxes, fees, fines, and other revenues equals or exceeds the amount proposed to be spent. This has led to deficit spending and the creation of a national debt. Except for a short period during the presidency of Andrew Jackson since its inception the United States federal government has always been in debt.

Gross debt includes both public debt and Intragovernmental holdings—money borrowed from federal funds such as Medicare and Social Security.

End of Fiscal Year	Gross Debt in $Billions undeflated Treas.	Gross Debt in $Billions undeflated OMB	as % of GDP Low-High	Debt Held By Public ($Billions)	as % of GDP (Treas/MW, OMB or OMB/MW)	GDP $Billions OMB/BEA est.=MW.com
1910	2.653		8.0	2.653	8.0	est. 32.8
1920	25.95		29.2	25.95	29.2	est. 88.6
1927	18.51		19.2	18.51	19.2	est. 96.5
1930	16.19		16.6	16.19	16.6	est. 97.4
1940	42.97	50.70	44.4-52.4	42.97	42.1	96.8/
1950	257.3	256.9	91.2-94.2	219.0	80.2	273.1/281.7
1960	286.3	290.5	54.6-56.0	236.8	45.6	518.9/523.9
1970	370.9	380.9	36.2-37.6	283.2	28.0	1,013/1,026
1980	907.7	909.0	33.4	711.9	26.1	2,724
1990	3,233	3,206	56.0-56.4	2,412	42.1	5,735
2000	5,674	5,629	57.4-57.8	3,410	34.7	9,821
2001	5,807	5,770	56.4-56.8	3,320	32.5	10,225
2002	6,228	6,198	58.8-59.0	3,540	33.6	10,544
2003	6,783	6,760	61.6-61.8	3,913	35.6	10,980
2004	7,379	7,355	63.0-63.2	4,296	36.8	11,686
2005	7,933	7,905	63.6-63.8	4,592	36.9	12,446
2006	8,507	8,451	63.8-64.2	4,829	36.5	13,255
2007	9,008	8,951	64.4-64.8	5,035	36.2	13,896
2008	10,025	9,986	69.2-69.6	5,803	40.2	14,439/14,394
2009	11,910	11,876	83.4-84.4	7,552	53.6	14,237/14,098
2010	13,562		93.4	9,023	62.2	/14,512

Fiscal years 1940–2009 GDP figures are derived from 2010 Office of Management and Budget figures which contained revisions of prior year figures due to significant changes from prior GDP measurements. Fiscal years 1950-2010 GDP measurements are derived from December 2010 Bureau of Economic Analysis figures which also tend to be subject to revision. The two measures in Fiscal Years 1980, 1990 and 2000-2007 diverge only slightly.

==== Nixon and Carter ====
Deficit spending resumed under Richard Nixon, who had become president by the time that the 1969 surplus was known. Nixon's advisors chose to fight inflation rather than to maintain a balanced budget. Nixon was famously quoted as saying, "We are all Keynesians now," with regard to the budget deficit that his administration began to accumulate during years of mild recession. He also imposed the first peacetime wage and price controls, mandatory petroleum allotments, and many other features of a planned economy. Even so, the debt held by the public as a share of gross domestic product reached its lowest post-World War II level of 23.2 per cent by the end of Fiscal Year 1974, shortly before Nixon resigned from the Office of the President.

With the distractions of the Watergate scandal and the budget deficit relatively small, however, most criticisms were sidelined until the administration of Jimmy Carter. During Carter's presidency, the term "stagflation" enjoyed widespread use as the economy stagnated even among increased inflation rates. This economic situation had been previously unheard of in the United States where increasing prices and wages had generally been seen during times of economic growth. Republicans began to make much mention of "Democratic deficits" and proposed the Balanced Budget Amendment as a cure.

During this time period, many liberal Democrats began to call for a Balanced Budget Amendment, including Governor Jerry Brown of California, who ran for president against Carter in 1980, and then-Congressman Paul Simon, who, upon his election to the U.S. Senate, would write the version of the amendment that came closest to passing.

==== National Taxpayers Union and an Article V Convention ====
The 1980 presidential election gave the presidency to Republican Ronald Reagan and control of the Senate to the Republicans. With President Reagan's support, passage of the amendment started to seem more possible. On August 4, 1982, the United States Senate introduced and debated Joint Resolution 58, an Amendment to the United States Constitution requiring for each year's Federal budget that "total outlays are no greater than total receipts" without three-fifths majority vote of both houses. Joint Resolution 58 passed in the Senate but was defeated in the House of Representatives, falling 46 votes short of the 2/3 majority needed. The amendment's backers, far from despairing, said that it was needed more than ever. They began a plan to make an "end run" around Congress, for the U.S. Constitution also allows two-thirds of state legislatures to petition for a convention to be called for the purpose of writing proposed amendments to the Constitution, a procedure which has never happened under the Constitution; the Constitution itself was created by the original constitutional convention of 1787. Much of this effort was initially organized by the National Taxpayers Union and its president at the time, George Snyder, a former Majority Leader of the Maryland State Senate. Many people were appalled at the concept; some constitutional scholars suggested that such a body could not be limited to its ostensible purpose and could largely rewrite the Constitution, perhaps removing or reducing the Bill of Rights, a fear that backers described as being totally groundless, since any proposed changes would still have to be approved by three-quarters of the states, which would presumably doom any attempt to end basic constitutional freedoms.

Detractors also noted that there was no mechanism in place by which to select delegates to any such convention, meaning that the state legislatures might choose to select them in a way which tended to subvert democracy. Backers also produced their own constitutional scholars stating that limiting such a convention was perfectly constitutional, that it could be limited to whatever purpose the states had called it for, and that states would be free to select the delegates to represent them, as was the case in 1787.

==== Gramm-Rudman-Hollings Act ====
Perhaps motivated by the number of state legislatures calling for such a convention approaching the required two-thirds, and recognizing its inability to make sufficient cuts on its own initiative to balance the budget, Congress responded in 1985 with the Gramm-Rudman-Hollings Act, named for its Senate sponsors, which called for automatic cuts in discretionary spending when certain deficit-reduction targets were not met. This act soon became a convenient target for opponents of all stripes, who blamed it for government failing to meet perceived needs, for not abolishing the deficit, and anything else that might be wrong with government. When it began to affect popular programs and was partially overturned in the courts, it was first amended to postpone the strength of its effects until later years, and then substantially revised in the Budget Enforcement Act of 1990, the Budget Control Act of 2011, and the Fiscal Responsibility Act of 2023, among other statutes.

==== George H. W. Bush and Ross Perot ====
President George H. W. Bush, in part to help ensure Congressional support for the Gulf War, agreed to turn back on a campaign promise of no tax increases, reportedly in part because he saw disaffection from his conservative base due to the looming deficit. In his rhetoric to defend the idea of a balanced budget amendment, Bush likened the U.S. government to a household.

Deficit spending continued but was no longer much of an issue until the presidential bid of Ross Perot during the 1992 presidential election. Perot made the deficit, and his plans to eliminate it, the major issue of his campaign, along with his protectionist plans to reduce and then eliminate the trade deficit. Many supporters of the Balanced Budget Amendment flocked to the Perot camp. Despite winning a substantial number of popular votes, Perot failed to carry a single state (zero electoral votes). He eventually faded from the political scene and when appearances were made, focused more on the trade deficit issue.

==== Newt Gingrich, Clinton and the budget surplus ====
President Bill Clinton did not support a constitutional amendment, but in his 1992 campaign, he called for balancing the budget through ordinary fiscal policy. He came into office facing a large deficit. Clinton signed into law the Omnibus Budget Reconciliation Act of 1993, which attacked the deficit by raising taxes. Beginning with the 1998 budget year, during his second term, the federal government ran a yearly budget surplus through FY 2001. During the Clinton administration, there was an official surplus of $419 billion during fiscal years 1998, 1999, 2000, and 2001.

However, it has been argued that this official balanced budget only constituted a surplus in the public debt (or on-budget), in which the Treasury Department borrowed increased tax revenue from intragovernmental debt (namely the Social Security Trust Fund), thus adding more interest on Treasury bonds. In effect, the four year alleged 'surplus' was only in public debt holdings, while the National Debt Outstanding increased every fiscal year, the lowest being a $17.9 billion deficit in FY2000. Meanwhile, Government Sponsored Enterprises (GSEs) such as GNMA, FNMA and FHLMC continued to borrow and spend an extra $543.6 billion over and above their previous 3 years. GSE debt instruments are classified as US Government Securities, but are not officially part of the Federal Debt total. (Note: Submitted by John Buck)

In 1995, the Republican-led Congress immediately engaged in a battle with President Clinton culminating in a vetoed budget and a brief shutdown of the Federal government. Despite negotiations disagreement remained on the pace of spending cuts. Ultimately Republican concessions differed little from what was attainable without shutdown. One provision of their "Contract with America" campaign document, the brainchild of Newt Gingrich, who would later become Speaker of the House, called for a balanced-budget amendment. In 1995, such an amendment (requiring 3/5th House & Senate votes for deficits) passed the House of Representatives and came within one vote of passing the Senate.

In his final State of the Union address, Clinton said the United States should continue to balance its books and pay off the debt.

==== Deficits under George W. Bush and Barack Obama ====
A recession, tax cuts and increases in military and other spending have eliminated late 1990s-era surpluses. Both the deficit and debt grew to the largest in U.S. history. In fiscal years starting September 30, 2002, and ending September 30, 2004, the deficit increased nearly 50%.

By 2008, the last full year of George W. Bush's presidency, the deficit had almost doubled again, for the first time exceeding $1 trillion. As a result, during the administration of President George W. Bush, the gross debt increased from $5.7 trillion in January 2001 to $10.7 trillion by December 2008, rising from 57.0% of GDP to 74.5% of GDP.

By the end of 2008, a large reduction in tax revenues caused by the Great Recession and the cost of federal stimulus spending began contributing to a rapidly increasing deficit. Responses to the crisis from both the Bush administration—the bank bailouts and economic stimulus of late 2008—and more stimulus spending in the first months of the Obama administration grew the deficit further. By the end of 2009, the national debt reached a record $11.9 trillion. The Congressional Budget Office estimated in March 2009 that under the Obama administration public debt would rise from 40.8% of GDP in 2008 to 70.1% in 2012. Gross debt did rise to 84.5% of GDP at the end of Fiscal Year 2009 and to 93.5% of GDP at the end of the fiscal year 2010. (Gross debt includes both public debt and intragovernmental holdings – money borrowed from federal funds such as Medicare and Social Security.)

Additions to U.S. public debt from FY1994 to FY2012
Fiscal year (begins Oct 1 of prev. year)	Annual deficit	% of GDP	Total debt	% of GDP
1994	$281.0 billion	4.0%	$4.70 trillion	67.3%
1995	$281.5 billion	3.8%	$4.95 trillion	67.8%
1996	$251.0 billion	3.2%	$5.20 trillion	67.7%
1997	$188.5 billion	2.3%	$5.40 trillion	65.9%
1998	$113.0 billion	1.3%	$5.55 trillion	63.8%
1999	$130.0 billion	1.4%	$5.65 trillion	61.4%
2000	$18.0 billion	0.2%	$5.65 trillion	57.8%
2001	$133.5 billion	1.3%	$5.80 trillion	56.8%
2002	$421.0 billion	4.0%	$6.25 trillion	59.1%
2003	$555.0 billion	5.1%	$6.80 trillion	61.8%
2004	$596.0 billion	5.1%	$7.40 trillion	63.1%
2005	$553.5 billion	4.4%	$7.95 trillion	63.7%
2006	$536.5 billion	4.1%	$8.50 trillion	64.3%
2007	$500.5 billion	3.6%	$9.00 trillion	64.8%
2008	$1,017 billion	7.1%	$10.0 trillion	69.6%
2009	$1,885 billion	13.4%	$11.9 trillion	84.5%
2010	$1,652 billion	11.4%	$13.6 trillion	93.5%
2011	$1,316 billion	8.2%	$15.2 trillion	96.5%
2012	$1,327 billion	8.4%	$16.3 trillion	~104%

During the 2011 US debt ceiling crisis, some Republicans supported a bill that would avert the crisis by raising the debt ceiling, but with an increase that would not take effect until a balanced-budget amendment was approved by both houses of Congress and submitted to the states. In addition to balancing the budget, it would also impose a constitutional limit on federal spending as a percentage of gross domestic product and would set a supermajority requirement on tax increases.

The Budget Control Act of 2011, which resolved the debt-ceiling crisis, required Congress to vote on a balanced-budget amendment in the near future. In addition, it stated that once a balanced budget amendment was sent to the states, the debt ceiling would be automatically increased by $1.5 trillion (this would be in addition to the initial debt limit increase of $2.1 trillion (from $14.294 to $16.394 trillion)).

On November 18, 2011, the House of Representatives voted 261-165 (two-thirds required) on H.J.Res.2, a balanced budget amendment proposal similar to the annual balance resolution that passed the House in 1995 and would not have imposed a supermajority requirement on tax increases. House Rules Committee chair David Dreier (R-CA), who had voted for the amendment in 1995, announced that he had changed his mind about the need to amend the Constitution, in light of the success in balancing the budget in the late 1990s.

On December 14, 2011, the Senate voted on two BBA proposals. S.J.Res.24 by Sen. Mark Udall (D-CO) failed with the support of 20 Democrats and one Republican, and S.J.Res.10 by Sen. Orrin Hatch (R-UT) failed with the support of 47 Republicans and no Democrats.

The U.S. House next voted on a BBA on April 12, 2018, when it failed 233-184. The vote followed enactment of the Bipartisan Budget Act of 2018 on February 9, 2018, which avoided automatic cuts to a variety of programs by removing the deficit effects of the Tax Cuts and Jobs Act of 2017 from the 5- and 10-year scorecards that the Office of Management and Budget maintains under the Statutory Pay-As-You-Go Act.

The increase the federal debt, elevated inflation, and higher interest rates associated with the COVID-19 pandemic have renewed congressional interest in a constitutional fiscal rule. In addition to variations on the traditional annual balance concept, new approaches have emerged. These include a constitutional debt limit, a "Business Cycle BBA" that would tie spending to a rolling average of recent revenue, and a "Principles-based BBA" that proposes general principles and leaves the details to implementing legislation.

==== Impact ====
There is substantial agreement among economists that a strict balanced budget amendment would have adverse effects. In times of recession, deficit spending has significant benefits, whereas spending cuts by governments aggravate and lengthen recessions. In 2003, approximately 90% of the members of the American Economic Association agreed with the statement, "If the federal budget is to be balanced, it should be done over the course of the business cycle, rather than yearly." Weighted by confidence, 99% of U.S. economists surveyed by IGM in 2017 agreed that a balanced budget amendment would not reduce economic output variability in the United States, and 53% agreed that it would not substantially decrease the borrowing costs of the federal government.

Economist and public choice scholar James Buchanan was a prominent advocate for a balanced budget amendment. In U.S. politics, Republicans tend to advocate for balanced budget amendments, whereas Democrats oppose them. Lobbying organizations supporting the balanced budget amendment include: Balanced Budget Amendment Task Force, the American Legislative Exchange Council, and Citizens for Self-Governance. The Center for Budget and Policy Priorities has argued that constitutional balanced budget amendment would pose serious risks.

The amendment has been called "political posturing" because its proponents use it to position themselves as supporters of a balanced budget but without specifying which unpopular tax increases or spending cuts they would support to reach that goal. For example, Robert Bixby of the anti-deficit Concord Coalition called the amendment "an avoidance device." Economist Dean Baker has noted that if the federal government were to run budget surpluses with the US still experiencing a large trade deficit, the economy would, in the absence of economic bubbles, shrink and experience rising unemployment. Without significant devaluation of the US dollar, he has stated, the federal government necessarily has to run budget deficits to offset trade deficits or there will be high unemployment.

It has been argued that such amendment would likely be unenforceable. Among other reasons, the standard budgetary process in the United States operates with projected figures. There is no way of knowing ahead of time whether the budget would end up unbalanced in any fiscal year before that fiscal year is over. While the Congress may be mandated by the amendment only to pass balanced budgets, this could be easily circumvented by inflating revenue projections or routing spending through off-budget channels. Balanced-budget amendment proposals often contain an exemption for emergencies such as being in the state of war. It could be envisioned that the Congress would simply declare the country in a perpetual state of war, year after year, just to avoid the necessity of politically costly spending cuts or tax increases.

== Asia ==
=== Hong Kong ===
The Hong Kong Basic Law stipulates that the government must keep “the expenditure within the limits of revenues in drawing up its budget” and “avoid deficits”. Debt to GDP in Hong Kong was 42.4% in 2019.

== See also ==
- Deficit spending
- Golden Rule (fiscal policy)
- Euro area crisis
- Keynesian economics
- Tragedy of the commons

== Sources ==
- Murau, Steffen; Thie, Jan-Erik (2022). "Für eine Ausstattung des Energie- und Klimafonds mit Kreditermächtigungen (In Favor of Endowing the Energy and Climate Fund with Borrowing Powers)" (PDF). Wirtschaftsdienst (in German). 102 (6). Walter de Gruyter GmbH: 449–455. doi:10.1007/s10273-022-3215-3. ISSN 1613-978X.
