= Contingency operation =

Military response to emergencies

United States Congress
- Citation: 10 U.S.C. § 101(a)(13)
- Territorial extent: United States Federal Government
- Enacted: 2011
- Commenced: January 3, 2012

Related legislation
- Authorization for Use of Military Force
- Status: In force

A contingency operation is a United States Department of Defense operation, conducted in response to natural disasters, terrorists, subversives, or as otherwise directed by appropriate authority to protect national interests. The designation is made by a finding by the discretion of the Secretary of Defense, and triggers the implementation of a variety of wartime plans and preparations throughout the federal government, and within each of the military branches. Contingency operations are often referred to more specifically as overseas contingency operations (OCO), a term which is often substituted because there has not been a recent war on United States soil. The term's best known use is in the United States Congress' Overseas Contingency Operations funding, a discretionary budget appropriation sometimes described as a slush fund used originally for the wars in Iraq and Afghanistan, but now used more broadly for other expenditures associated primarily with the war on terror.

== Background ==
Historically, the US Congress in its appropriations allocates the "base" budget of the US Department of Defense (DoD), that includes the routine costs of maintaining the military forces. In case of an unforeseen threat (like an actual war) Congress may consider a supplemental appropriations bill to increase the funding. The latter mechanism was extensively used in the 20th century, especially at the beginning of hostilities. Usually (Korean War, Vietnam War, 1990-1991 Gulf War) the expenses were quickly rolled into the next base DoD budget (in the case of Korean War, the supplemental appropriations in the 1951 totaled 32.8 billion dollars, and in 1952 just 1.4 billion). After the September 11 attacks the pattern have changed, as the Congress started to rely on non-base funding for larger amounts and longer periods (amounts allocated for both supplemental and designated for non-base activities in the Vietnam war averaged 6% of the DoD budget vs. 17% in the first two decades of the 21st century).

Initially, until 2010, the non-base funding was mostly provided through emergency-related supplemental appropriations. Starting in 2011, under the Obama administration, Congress was asked to authorize war funds as a part of the regular appropriation bill. At this point the formal use of the label Overseas Contingency Operations (OCO) started to indicate that the authorized amounts were exempt from the Budget Control Act (BCA) limits on discretionary spending. OCO started to replace the "Global war on terrorism" in early 2009. BCA has specifically amended the Balanced Budget and Emergency Deficit Control Act (BBEDCA) to include an "Overseas Contingency Operations/Global War on Terrorism" designation, so that the "emergency" label was no longer needed to exclude funds from the BCA caps.

As of 2019, there were no procedural or statutory limits on the amounts of OCO spending, although the president must approve the spending after the appropriation bill is passed for the funds to become available.

Starting in 2012, Congress has adopted the same approach (and the OCO designation) for foreign affairs funding, sometimes with "no-year" accounts (funds available until spent), each year allocating more money than was requested. This use of OCO, which some argued was a mechanism to bypass the budget limits, ceased in 2022.

== Legal definition ==
Per 10 USC 101 (a)(13), the term “contingency operation” means a military operation that—

(A) is designated by the Secretary of Defense as an operation in which members of the armed forces are or may become involved in

- military actions,
- operations, or
- hostilities against an enemy of the United States or
- against an opposing military force; or

(B) results in the call or order to, or retention on, active duty of members of the uniformed services under section 688, 12301(a), 12302, 12304, 12304a, 12305, or 12406 of this title, chapter 13 of this title, section 3713 of title 14, or any other provision of law during a war or during a national emergency declared by the President or Congress.

== See also ==
- Contingency Fund for Foreign Intercourse, an off-budget fund in the US at the end of the 18th century
- Off-budget fund (Germany)

== Sources ==
- McGarry, Brendan W.; Morgenstern, Emily M. (2019). "Overseas Contingency Operations Funding: Background and Status" (PDF). crsreports.congress.gov. Congressional Research Service.
- McCabe, Emily M. (February 10, 2021). "Foreign Affairs Overseas Contingency Operations (OCO) Funding: Background and Current Status". Congressional Research Service (13 ed.). Archived from the original on 2021-07-17.
