= Off-budget fund (Germany) =

Budget for limited government tasks in an emergency

In German budget law, an off-budget fund ("off-budget entity", "special fund", German: Sondervermögen, the same word Sondervermögen in other context can be used for "special asset", a state-owned enterprise) is an independent additional budget ("shadow budget") that is intended exclusively to fulfill individual, limited tasks of the federal government in an emergency situation, is not part of the regular budget and thus is not subject to the debt brake and can be used for circumvention of budget rules. Management and financial responsibility for the off-budget entities is provided by the federal government, the funds are set up and managed in accordance with the provisions of the Federal Budget Code (BHO) (Section 113 BHO). In the 2020s the use of off-budget funds dramatically expanded, with the total (multi-year) potential deficits by the end of fiscal 2022 coming to 400 billion euro, about 10% of 2023 GDP. For comparison, the debt brake limit would only allow borrowing of 13 billion euro in 2023.

In contrast to the federal budget of Germany, which represents all income and expenditure of the federal government (general budget financing of all departments), the expenditure of the special fund is strictly earmarked. The federal government can be authorized to take out loans to cover the expenses of a special fund. According to the principle of budgetary universality, all income in the general budget serves to cover all expenses (Section 8 BHO). Since the introduction of the debt brake, the budgets of the federal and state governments have generally had to be balanced without income from loans (Art. 109 Para. 3 Sentence 1 GG); the income should be generated from general tax revenue.

In the case of off-budget funds, only the ongoing contributions to the fund and withdrawals from it need to be included in the budget (Art. 110 Para. 1 Sentence 1 HS 2 GG). However, like the budget itself, special funds may only be established through legislation and are subject to control by the Bundestag, the German Bundesrat and the Federal Audit Office (Art. 114 GG).

== History ==
The use of off-budget funds is not new: state-owned enterprises were allowed to issue their own debt under the 1924 law that covered initially postal service and railroads (at the time, the Reichsbahn and the Reichspost,). The tradition continued until the Corporatization or privatization of these entities in 1993-1994 (a modern example is still provided by Autobahn GmbH). Postwar reconstruction involved multiple funds, including the one that held the money received from the Marshall Plan. These funds were also used as a collateral to obtain market loans. Similar mechanisms were used to offset the costs of the reunification of Germany, with the total amount equivalent to about 300 billion euro.

In late 2025, the 500B-euro SVIK fund was approved by the Bundestag.

== Circumvention of the budget rules ==
The traffic light coalition found the off-budget funds to be a convenient tool to reconcile the divergent goals of the three parties:

- Greens wanted major investments into energy transformation;
- SPD needed to preserve the social expenditures of the budget;
- fiscally-conservative FDP required strict adherence to the budget rules.

Notably, the new KTF fund for climate protection and technology development did not have its own authority to issue debt. In practice, the fund was getting money from the federal budget and carbon emissions trading. The planned transfers to KTF from the fund allocated to fight the COVID-19 pandemics were also in practice just allocations from the federal budget (and legally questionable due to change in the earmarking). Therefore all these transfers should have been covered under the debt brake reactivated in 2023. To avoid this issue, the coalition passed a law that money "accumulated" in the funds (due to allocations in the previous years with the break suspended) can be spent off-budget.

Although as of 2022 Asatryan et al. concluded that there is no systematic misuse of the mechanism, some of the off-budget funds established or extended in the 2020s (like Sondervermögen Bundeswehr (100 billion euros for rearmament) or the Klima and Transformationsfonds, KTF) are "clear examples" of intentional use of the off-budget funds to circumvent the budget rules and the legally dubious transfer of 60 billion euros of funds dedicated to pandemics to KTF was challenged in 2022 in the Federal Constitutional Court. In 2023 the court declared unconstitutional the repurposing for KTF of the pandemic funds allocated under a temporary emergency suspension of the debt brake. It was forecasted in early 2025 that, as the money in Sondervermögen Bundeswehr runs out, either the German defense budget that had been essentially flat at €50–53 billion through 2026, will have to be increased by about €30 billion or a new off-budget fund will have to be set up.

Deutsche Bundesbank in 2023 argued that due to opacity of the off-budget vehicles and potential problems with the European budget limit, it would be better to return to the previous arrangement with central government finances relying on the core budget.

== See also ==
- Overseas Contingency Operation, a similar off-budget vehicle in the US
- Contingency Fund for Foreign Intercourse, an off-budget fund in the US at the end of the 18th century

== Sources ==
- Asatryan, Zareh; Heinemann, Friedrich; Nover, Justus (2022). "The other government: State-owned enterprises in Germany and their implications for the core public sector. ZEW Expert Brief, No. 22-08" (PDF). Mannheim: ZEW - Leibniz Centre for European Economic Research.
- Beznoska, Martin; Burstedde, Alexander; Hentze, Tobias (12 September 2025). Sondervermögen Infrastruktur und Klimaneutralität: Bund investiert nur wenig zusätzlich (PDF) (Report). IW-Kurzbericht. Cologne: Institut der deutschen Wirtschaft (IW).
- Deni, John R.; Henke, Marina E.; Matlé, Aylin; Besch, Sophia; Bosch, Tim; Campbell, Loyle; Stent, Angela E; Rathke, Jeffrey D.; Luetkefend, Theresa; Stumbaum, May-Britt U.; de Cet, Sharon (2025). Assessing the Zeitenwende: Implications for Germany, the United States, and Transatlantic Security. Carlisle Barracks, PA: US Army War College Press.
- Deutsche Bundesbank (June 2023). "Central government's off-budget entities". Monthly Report. 75 (6): 63–82.
- Rietzler, Katja; Watt, Andrew (2022-12-07). "3. Public Investment in Germany". Greening Europe. Cambridge, UK: Open Book Publishers. doi:10.11647/obp.0328.03. ISBN 978-1-80064-905-7.
- Murau, Steffen; Thie, Jan-Erik (2022). "Für eine Ausstattung des Energie- und Klimafonds mit Kreditermächtigungen (In Favor of Endowing the Energy and Climate Fund with Borrowing Powers)" (PDF). Wirtschaftsdienst (in German). 102 (6). Walter de Gruyter GmbH: 449–455. doi:10.1007/s10273-022-3215-3. ISSN 1613-978X.
