= Contingency Fund for Foreign Intercourse =

Early U.S. "black budget"

The Contingency Fund for Foreign Intercourse (sometimes referred to as the Contingent Fund for Foreign Intercourse) was a United States government "black budget" program established in 1790 to fund covert operations primarily directed against Europe. Three years later, it consumed 12% of the government's budget to help pay the ransoms of American hostages held by Barbary pirates. In 1846, it came under the scrutiny of Congress, but the government refused to provide details of the operation of the fund.

== History ==
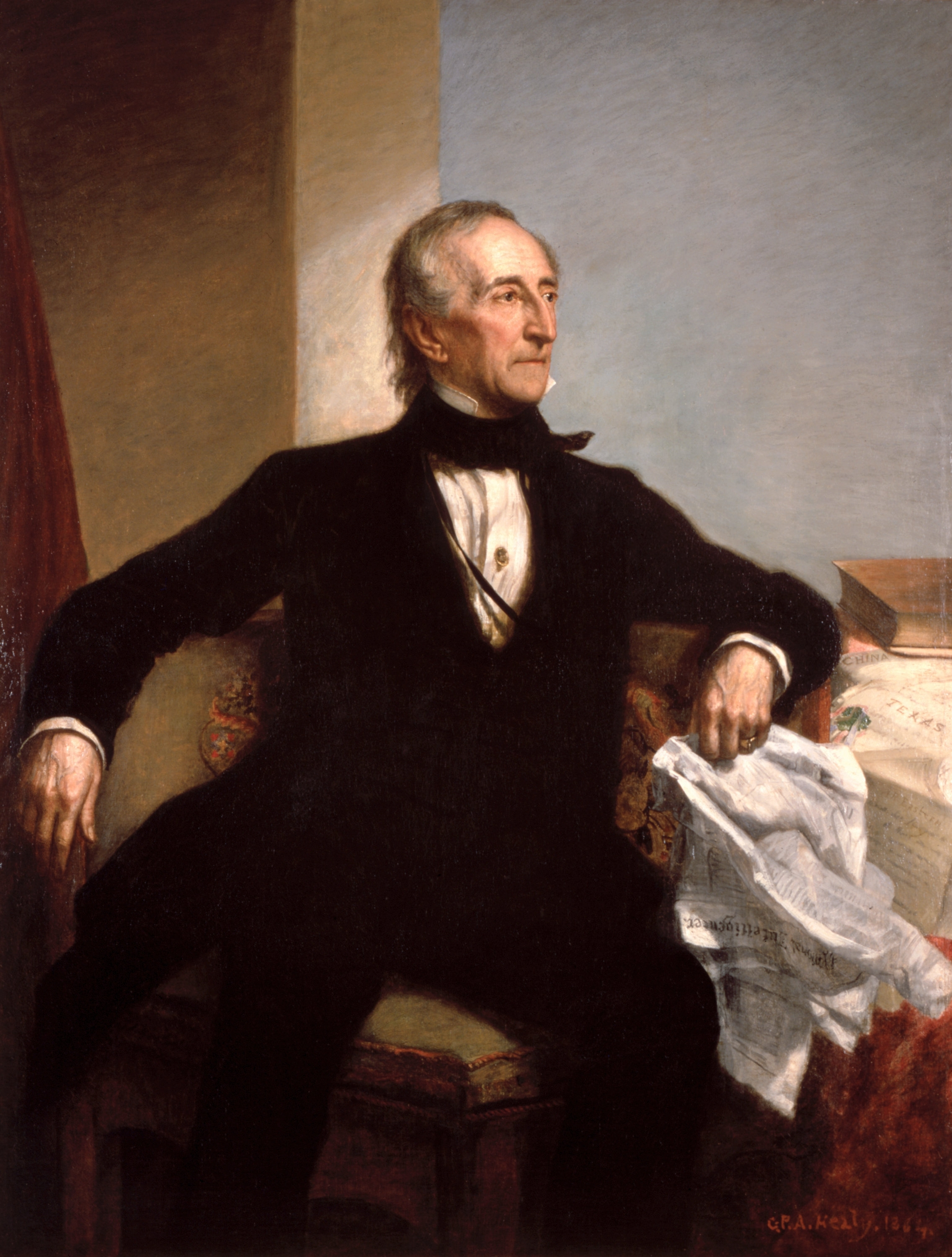
An 1846 attempt by Whigs to obtain details of covert operations ordered by John Tyler, pictured, was rebuffed by then-president James Polk.

The Contingency Fund was established at the request of President George Washington in July 1790 with an initial appropriation of $40,000. Within three years this amount had grown to more than a million dollars, consuming roughly twelve percent of the United States federal budget. The terms of the appropriation the President to conceal the nature and purpose of expenditures made from the fund. Information about activities funded by the Contingency Fund are sparse, however, it is known they were generally ad hoc covert operations directed against European states.

In 1831 Senator John Forsyth described the purpose of the fund as one designed to finance the operation of "spies, if the gentleman pleases; for persons sent publicly and secretly to search for important information, political or commercial ... for agents to feel the pulse of foreign governments."

By 1846 the Contingency Fund had come under increasing congressional scrutiny. Whigs in the United States House of Representatives requested a full accounting of expenditures made under the fund during the just-completed administration of John Tyler, a request then-president James Polk rebuffed, declaring that "in no nation is the application of such funds made public."

In the 1880s the first permanent U.S. government intelligence services were established in the form of the Office of Naval Intelligence and the Military Intelligence Division.

== Known operations financed by the Fund ==
In its first year of existence, 1790, the fund was used to finance a sensitive diplomatic mission by Gouverneur Morris in London regarding outstanding boundary matters between the United States and United Kingdom. The first use of the fund to underwrite covert activities, meanwhile, occurred shortly thereafter when the United States secretly paid ransoms and tributes to the Barbary States for the release of American hostages and promises of non-interference with American shipping.

In 1812 James Madison used $50,000 from the fund, equivalent to the cost of a naval frigate, to acquire the Henry letters, purported correspondence between alleged British spy John Henry and the Governor General of Canada. The publication of the papers by Madison helped generate sufficient public outrage to secure the passage of the United States declaration of war upon the United Kingdom. Madison also tapped the fund to secretly finance paramilitary forces in Florida as a pressure against Spain.

According to a public statement made by President John Tyler, Duff Green was paid $1,000 from the fund to finance an operation in the United Kingdom in 1841 that influenced the appointment of the Lord Ashburton as the British negotiator in the Maine-New Brunswick border dispute. The ultimate settlement of that dispute resulted in the net transfer of about 2,000 square miles (5,200 km^{2}) of territory to the United States by the United Kingdom, to the consternation of many in Canada.

== See also ==
- United States Intelligence Community
