= Fort Adams =

Former United States Army post in Newport, Rhode Island

- Newport, Rhode Island
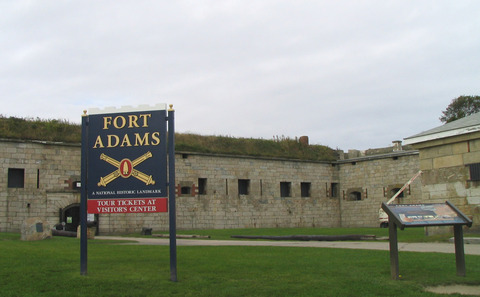
- Fort Adams on 31 August 2005

Site information
- Type: Coastal artillery post
- Controlled by: United States

Site history
- Built: 1798–1799; 1824–1857
- In use: 1799–1824; 1841–1953
- Materials: granite, shale and brick

Garrison information
- Past commanders: Captain John Henry; Lieutenant Colonel Benjamin Kendrick Pierce; Brigadier General Robert Anderson; Colonel Henry Jackson Hunt
- Fort Adams
- U.S. National Register of Historic Places
- U.S. National Historic Landmark District
- Interactive map showing the location of Fort Adams
- Nearest city: Newport, Rhode Island
- Coordinates: 41.47866°N 71.33788°W
- Built: 1799, rebuilt 1824
- Architect: Louis de Tousard (1799), Simon Bernard and Joseph G. Totten (1824)
- NRHP reference No.: 70000014

Significant dates
- Added to NRHP: July 28, 1970
- Designated NHLD: December 8, 1976

Fort Adams is a former United States Army post in Newport, Rhode Island, that was established on July 4, 1799, as a First System coastal fortification, named for the American Founding Father and president John Adams, who was in office at the time. Its first commanding officer was Captain John Henry, who was later instrumental in starting the War of 1812. The current Fort Adams was built between 1824 and 1857 under the Third System of coastal forts; it is part of Fort Adams State Park today.

== History ==
The first Fort Adams was designed by Major Louis de Tousard of the United States Army Corps of Engineers as part of the first system of US fortifications. After some additions in 1809, this fort mounted 17 cannon and was garrisoned during the War of 1812 by Wood's State Corps of Rhode Island militiamen. The United States Secretary of War's report for December 1811 describes the fort as "an irregular star fort of masonry, with an irregular indented work of masonry adjoining it, mounting seventeen heavy guns. ... The barracks are of wood and bricks, for one company."

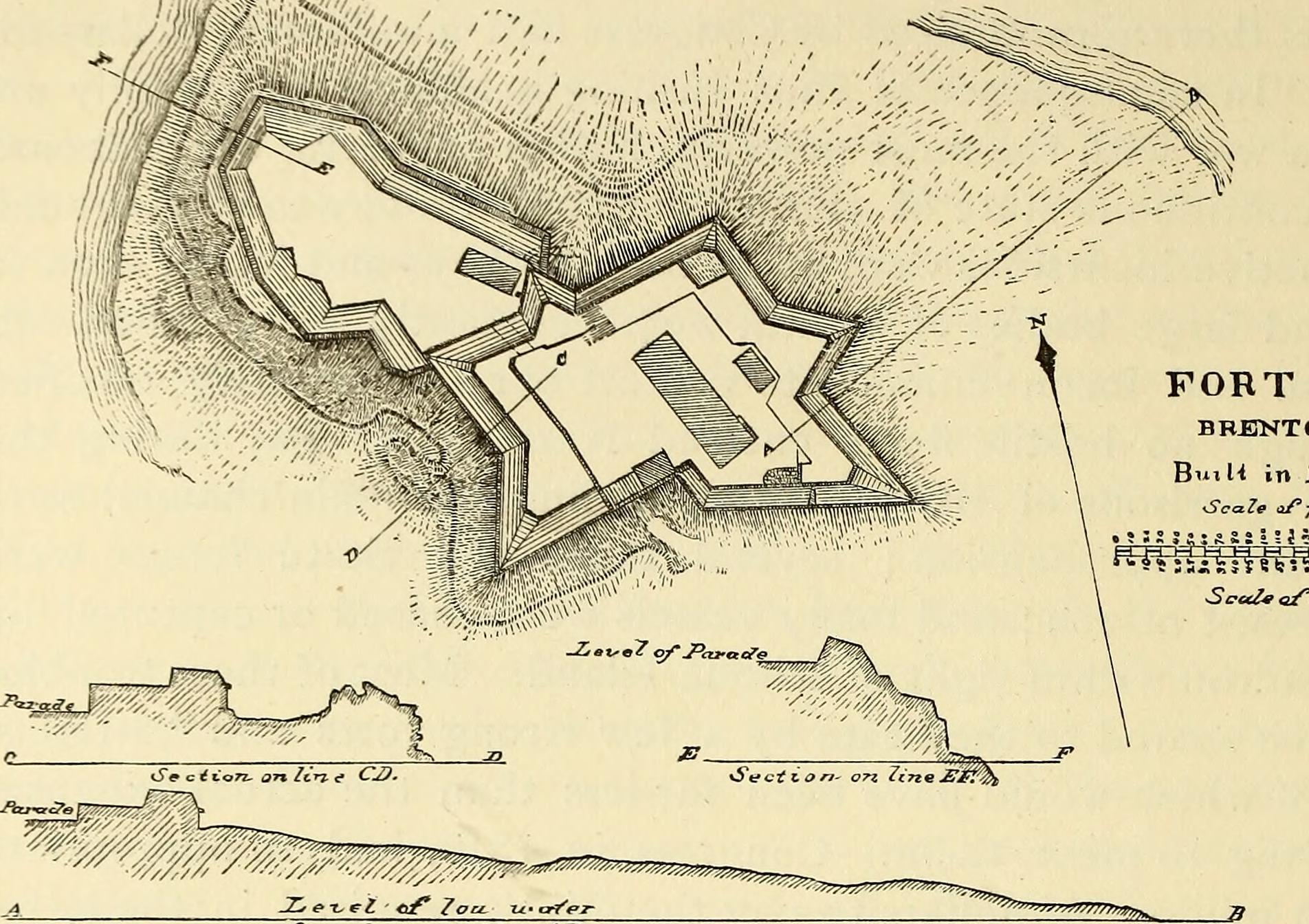
Plan of First System Fort Adams

After the War of 1812, there was a thorough review of the fortification needs of the United States and it was decided to replace the older Fort Adams with a newer and much larger fort. This was part of what became known as the Third System of U.S. fortifications. The new fort was designed by Brigadier General Simon Bernard, a Frenchman who had served as a military engineer under Napoleon Bonaparte. Bernard designed the new Fort Adams in the classic style and it became the most complex fortification in the Western Hemisphere. It included a tenaille and crownwork, a complex outer work on the southern (landward) side, designed to break up and channel an assault force. The fort also had a detached redoubt 650 yards (594 m) south of the main fort. In the United States, it is rivaled in size only by Fort Monroe in Hampton, Virginia, and Fort Jefferson on the Dry Tortugas in Florida.

Construction of the new fort began in 1824 under First lieutenant Andrew Talcott and continued at irregular intervals until 1857. From 1825 to 1838 construction was overseen by Lieutenant Colonel Joseph Gilbert Totten, the foremost American military engineer of his day. In 1838 Totten became U.S. Army Chief of Engineers and served until his death in 1864.

The new Fort Adams was first garrisoned in August 1841, functioning as an active U.S. Army post until 1950. During this time the fort was active in five major wars – the Mexican–American War (1846–1848), American Civil War (1861–1865), Spanish–American War (1898), World War I (1917–1918), and World War II (1941–1945) — but never fired a shot in anger.

At the start of the Mexican–American War in 1846, the post was commanded by Benjamin Kendrick Pierce, the brother of President Franklin Pierce. The fort's redoubt, about 1/4 mile (0.4 km) south of the main fort, was built during this war.

From 1848 to 1853, Fort Adams was commanded by Colonel William Gates, a long-serving veteran of both the War of 1812 and the Mexican–American War. The fort's garrison was ordered to California and many of the soldiers lost their lives when the steamer SS San Francisco was wrecked in a North Atlantic storm on December 24, 1853.

A report of 1854 stated that Fort Adams was armed with 100 32-pounder seacoast guns, 57 24-pounder seacoast guns, and 43 24-pounder flank howitzers. All of these weapons were smoothbore cannon. The flank howitzers were short-barreled guns deployed in casemates in the tenaille and redoubt to protect the fort against a landward assault.

From 1859 to 1863 the fort was in the care of Ordnance Sergeant Mark Wentworth Smith, a Mexican–American War veteran who was wounded at the Battle of Chapultepec. He died in 1879 at the age of 76, the oldest active-duty enlisted soldier in the history of the U.S. Army.

== Civil War ==
The United States Department of War was concerned about the political sympathies of residents in Maryland during the American Civil War, so the United States Naval Academy was moved in 1861 from Annapolis, Maryland, to Fort Adams. In September 1861, the academy moved to the Atlantic House Hotel in Newport, Rhode Island, and remained there for the rest of the war.

Among the midshipmen assigned to the Naval Academy while it was at Fort Adams was Robley D. Evans who was wounded at Fort Fisher, North Carolina, in 1865, commanded the battleship USS Iowa during the Spanish–American War in 1898, and later commanded the Great White Fleet on the first leg of its epic around-the-world voyage of 1906–1908. Among Evans' classmates at Fort Adams were future Rear Admiral Charles Sigsbee, who commanded the battleship USS Maine, and future Captain Charles Vernon Gridley, who commanded the protected cruiser Olympia at the Battle of Manila Bay on 1 May 1898.

In 1862 Fort Adams became the headquarters and recruit depot for the U.S. Army's 15th Infantry Regiment. This regiment, along with several others, was reorganized into a regiment of three eight-company battalions, with the 3rd Battalion formed at Fort Adams in March 1864.

From August to October 1863, Fort Adams was commanded by Brigadier General Robert Anderson, who had commanded Fort Sumter when it was attacked by Confederate forces in April 1861, beginning the American Civil War.

Plan of Third System Fort Adams

=== 1870s upgrade ===
As part of a major upgrade to U.S. seacoast defenses, Fort Adams' armament was modernized in the 1870s with eleven 15-inch (381 mm) Rodman guns, thirteen 10-inch (254 mm) Rodman guns, and four 6.4-inch (163 mm) (100-pounder) Parrott rifles. Three new emplacements were built for the 15-inch (381 mm) guns; the remainder replaced older weapons in the fort, of which all but 20 32-pounders were removed by 1873. For mobile defense, four 4.5-inch (114 mm) siege rifles, four 3-inch (76.2 mm) Ordnance rifles, and four 10-inch (254 mm) mortars were provided. In 1894, four 8-inch (203 mm) converted rifles were added in a new battery south of the fort.

== Twentieth century ==
=== Endicott period ===
As time went by, the fort's armament was upgraded to keep up with technological innovations. Major kinds of ordnance used at the fort included muzzle-loading cannon in the 19th century, rifled breech-loading artillery pieces in the early 20th century, and anti-aircraft guns during and after World War II. The fort received significant armament, in the form of batteries to the south of the main fort, under the Endicott and Taft programs from 1896 through 1907. These were to defend the East Passage of Narragansett Bay in combination with the new Fort Wetherill in Jamestown, Rhode Island, as part of the Coast Defenses of Narragansett Bay.

The Endicott and Taft-period batteries at Fort Adams were:

Name	No. of guns	Gun type	Carriage type	Years active
Greene-Edgerton	16	12-inch (305 mm) coast defense mortar M1890	barbette M1896	1898–1942
Reilly	2	10-inch (254 mm) gun M1888	disappearing M1896	1899–1917
Talbot	2	4.72-inch (120 mm) Armstrong gun	pedestal	1899–1919
unnamed	1	8-inch (203 mm) gun M1888	converted Rodman carriage	1898–1899?
Bankhead	3	6-inch (152 mm) Armstrong gun	pedestal	1907–1913
Belton	2	3-inch (76.2 mm) gun M1903	pedestal M1903	1907–1925

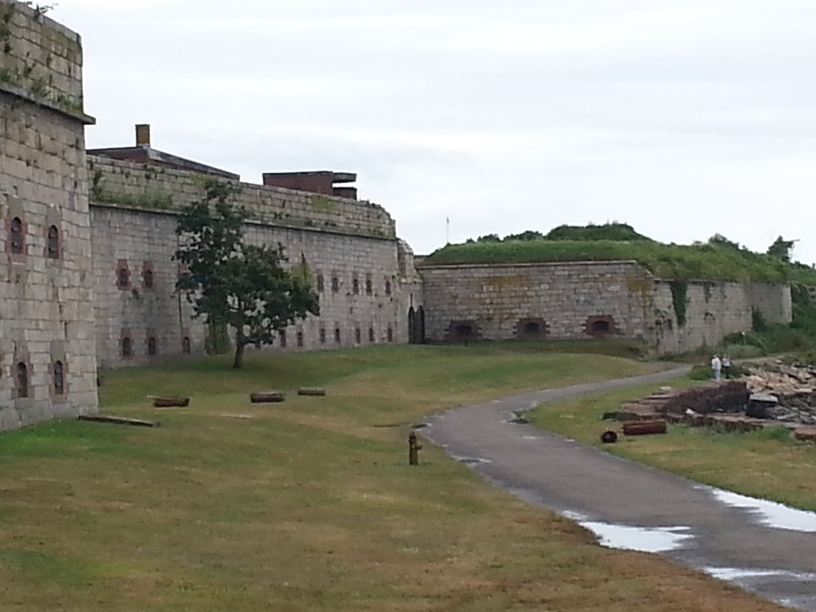
2016 view of the west front of Fort Adams. Note the Endicott-era fire control station.

Batteries Greene-Edgerton, Reilly, and Talbot were built between 1896 and 1899 and were the first of these to be completed. Battery Greene-Edgerton included sixteen mortars, all of which were at first called Battery Greene, but the battery was divided into two groups of eight in 1906. Battery Talbot, one of a number of batteries added on the United States East Coast at the outbreak of the Spanish–American War in 1898, included two 4.72-inch (120 mm) Armstrong guns. One gun of Battery Talbot is preserved at Equality Park in Newport.Rhode Island; another was in Westerly, Rhode Island, circa 1920–1977 and now is at Fort Moultrie near Charleston, South Carolina. An unnamed battery of a single 8-inch M1888 gun on a converted 1870s carriage also existed briefly from 1898. In 1907 two additional batteries were completed, Battery Bankhead with three 6-inch Armstrong guns and Battery Belton with two 3-inch M1903 guns.

Battery Greene-Edgerton was named for Major General Nathanael Greene of the American Revolutionary War and Lieutenant Colonel Wright P. Edgerton, a professor at the United States Military Academy. Battery Reilly was named for Captain Henry J. Reilly, killed in the China Relief Expedition near Peking on 15 August 1900 during the Boxer Rebellion who previously served at Fort Adams. Battery Talbot was named for Silas Talbot, a U.S. Army officer from Rhode Island in the American Revolutionary War who later became a United States Navy officer and commanded the frigate USS Constitution from 1799 to 1801. Battery Bankhead was named for Brevet Major General James Bankhead, who served in the War of 1812, Second Seminole War, and Mexican–American War. Battery Belton was named for Francis S. Belton, who served in the War of 1812 and the Mexican–American War.

In 1913 Battery Bankhead was disarmed and its three 6-inch (152 mm) guns sent to Hawaii.

=== World War I ===
The United States entered World War I in April 1917. During the war, Fort Adams served as the headquarters for the Coast Defenses of Narragansett Bay, as well as a training center. The United States Army Coast Artillery Corps (CAC) was chosen to man all U.S. heavy artillery in that war, as it was the only part of the U.S. Army with experience using big guns and had a significant number of personnel trained in the operation of such guns. Four heavy artillery regiments and two heavy artillery brigade headquarters were organized at Fort Adams and served in France, with troops of Coast Defense Commands from Maine, Rhode Island, New York, and elsewhere as their cadre. These included two of the four U.S. railway artillery regiments that saw action in that war (using French-made weapons) and their brigade headquarters. The railway gun units were designated the 52nd and 53rd Artillery Regiments (CAC) (originally the 7th and 8th Provisional Regiments), and the 30th Separate Artillery Brigade (Railway) (CAC) (originally the 1st Expeditionary Brigade). The 51st Artillery Regiment (CAC) (originally the 6th Provisional Regiment), 66th Artillery Regiment (CAC), and 34th Artillery Brigade (CAC) also were organized at Fort Adams and sent to France, but only the 51st completed training in time to see action. Thornton Wilder, author and playwright whose 1973 novel Theophilus North is set in Newport, served a three-month enlistment in the United States Army Coast Artillery Corps at Fort Adams during World War I. Wilder rose to the rank of corporal in the Army.

The two 10-inch (254 mm) guns of Battery Reilly were dismounted in 1917 for potential service as railway guns, but after considerable delay they were sent to Fort Warren near Boston, Massachusetts, in 1919 to replace guns removed from that fort. Eight of the sixteen mortars at Battery Greene-Edgerton were removed in 1918 for potential railway artillery service; this was also done as a force-wide program to improve the rate of fire due to overcrowding in the mortar pits during reloading.

Some sources state that Battery Talbot's guns were redeployed to Sachuest Point, a few miles from Fort Adams, from 1917 to 1919. However, U.S. Army records show that these guns came from Fort Strong, Massachusetts, in the Coast Defenses of Boston.

World War I ended on 11 November 1918. With the war over, Battery Talbot was disarmed in 1919 and its guns sent to Newport and Westerly as memorials. At some time after the war three 3-inch (76.2 mm) M1917 anti-aircraft guns were deployed at the fort, supplemented by at least two mobile 3-inch (76.2 mm) guns (or possibly mobile 75 mm guns) on White truck or Ford Model T chassis. Battery Belton's two 3-inch (76.2 mm) guns were transferred to Fort Wetherill in 1925 to replace obsolescent M1902 guns there. This left the eight mortars of Battery Greene-Edgerton as Fort Adams' only armament.

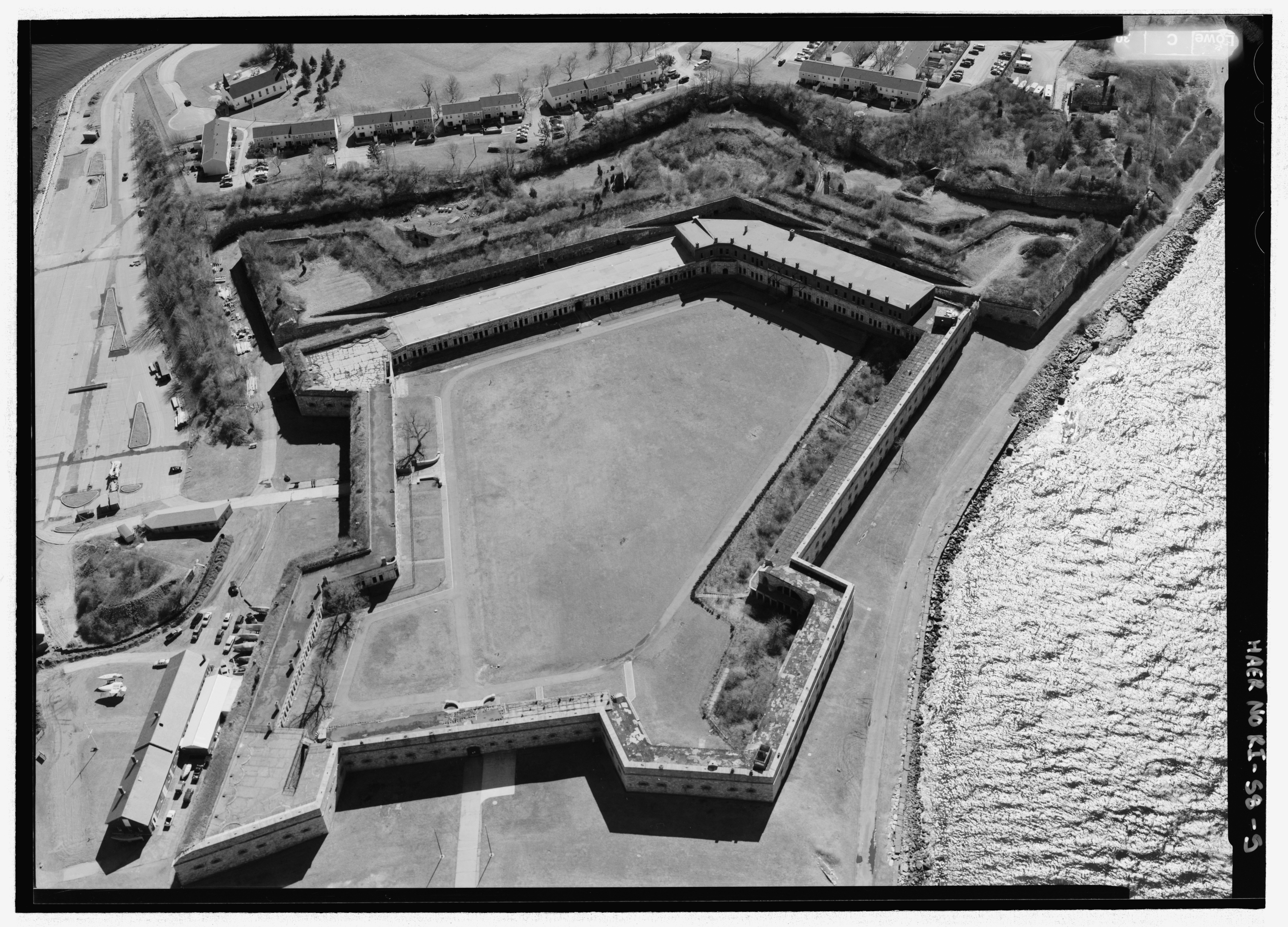
Aerial view of Fort Adams

=== World War II ===
In the Second World War a peak strength of over 3,000 soldiers were assigned to the Harbor Defenses of Narragansett Bay. In September 1940 the 243rd Coast Artillery Regiment of the Rhode Island National Guard was mobilized and sent to Fort Adams to reinforce the Regular Army's 10th Coast Artillery Regiment. The two regiments garrisoned several coast defense forts and anti-aircraft installations under the Harbor Defenses of Narragansett Bay. The United States entered the war on 7 December 1941, and during the war Fort Adams and most of the other Endicott Period forts in Rhode Island were superseded by new defenses centered on Fort Church and Fort Greene and their guns were scrapped.

However, the previous anti-aircraft guns at the fort were replaced by two 90-millimeter guns with several 40 mm Bofors guns and .50-caliber (12.7 mm) machine guns. An Anti-Motor Torpedo Boat Battery (AMTB 925), with two 90-millimeter guns on mobile mounts, was also at Fort Adams by December 1943. As the war progressed, the number of troops was gradually reduced to about 500 by the end of the war in August 1945.

== State Park ==
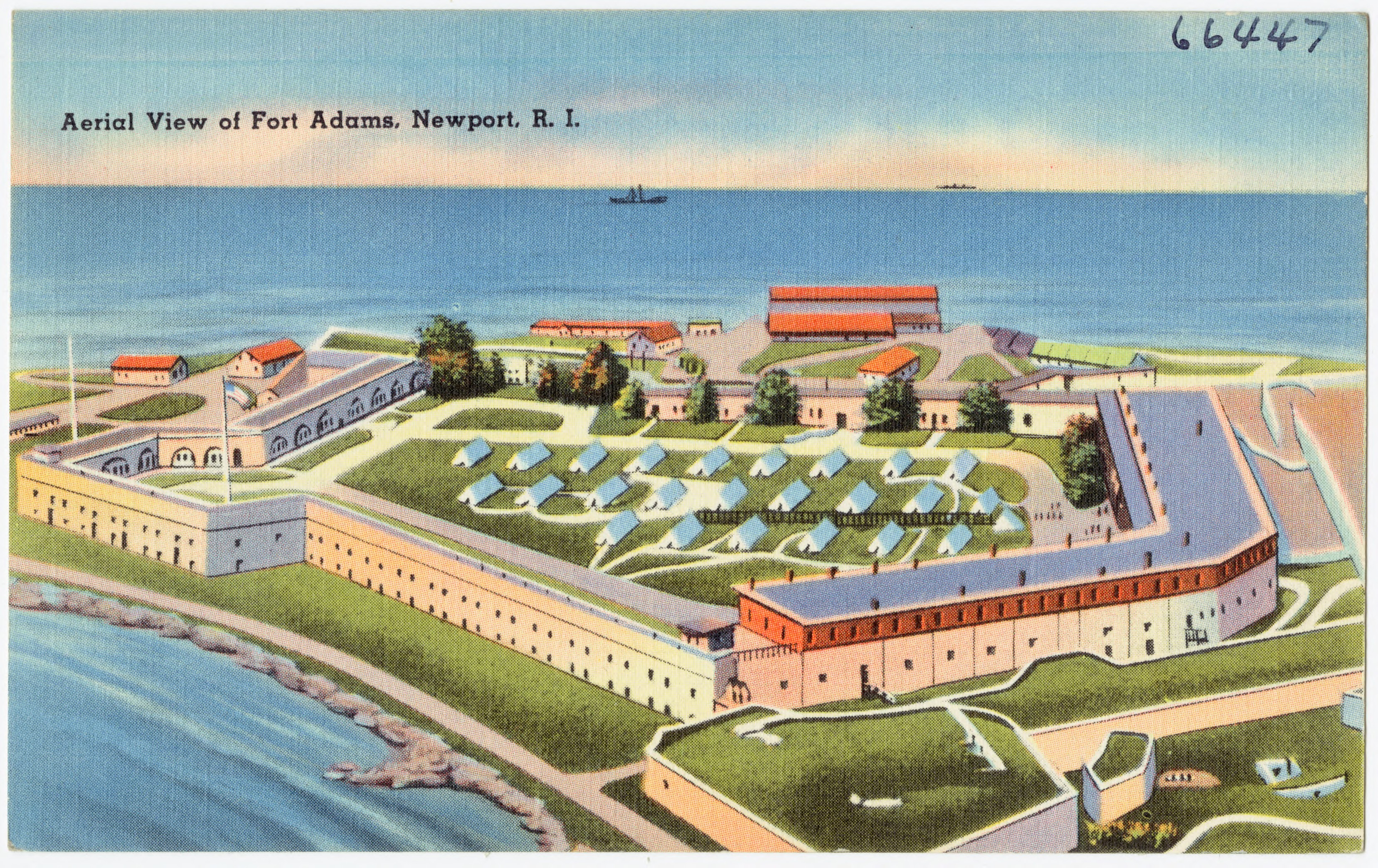
Postcard view, circa 1950

In 1953, the U.S. Army transferred ownership of Fort Adams to the U.S. Navy, which still uses some of the grounds for family housing. President Dwight D. Eisenhower lived at the former commanding officer's quarters (now called the Eisenhower House) during his summer vacations in Newport in 1958 and 1960.

From the early 1950s until the mid-1970s, Fort Adams fell victim to neglect, the weather, and vandalism. In 1965, the fort and most of the surrounding land was given to the State of Rhode Island for use as Fort Adams State Park.

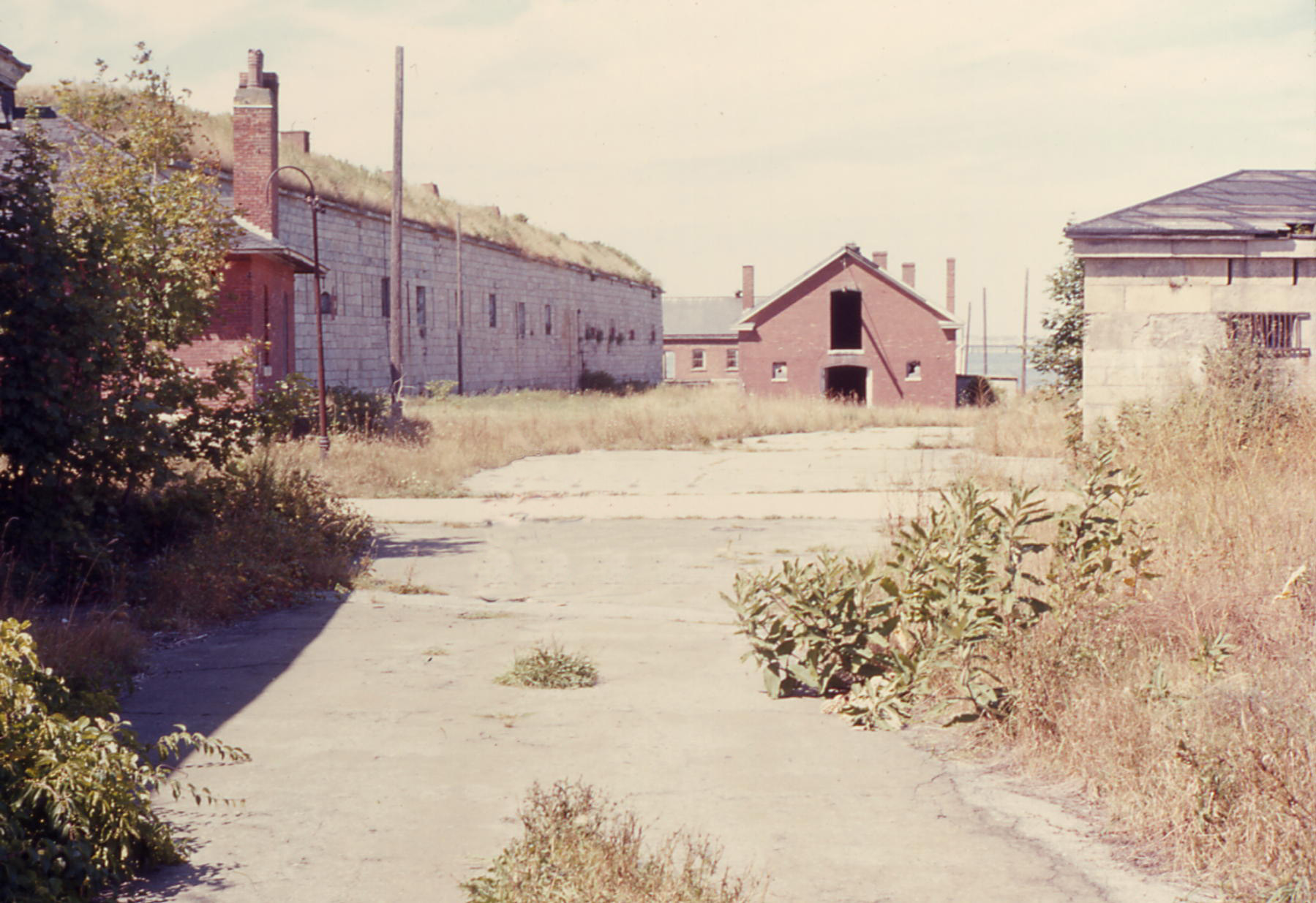
A section of historic Fort Adams in a neglected state in 1968.

In 1976, Fort Adams was declared a National Historic Landmark in recognition of its distinctive military architecture, which includes features not found in other forts of the period. Through the efforts of State Senator Eric O'D. Taylor, in the 1970s Fort Adams was cleaned up, opened for tours, and used for the filming of the PBS television miniseries The Scarlet Letter. The tour program was cancelled circa 1980 due to budget cutbacks by the State of Rhode Island. Since 1981, the Fort Adams grounds have been host to the Newport Jazz Festival and the Newport Folk Festival.

In the early 1990s, Fort Adams was subjected to an environmental remediation program which made the fort safe for public access. In 1994, the Fort Adams Trust was formed; to provide guided tours at the fort and oversee restoration work there. In 1995 the Fort Adams Trust began giving tours at the fort from May to September. Since that time, the fort has had several areas of the fort restored as well as having its land defenses cleared of overgrowth, and the trust's restoration efforts are ongoing.

In 2012, the park was the official venue for the America's Cup World Series in Newport.

== Notable persons associated with Fort Adams ==
- Robert Anderson – Commander of Fort Sumter and Civil War general
- John G. Barnard – Army engineer, Civil War general and Superintendent of West Point.
- Alexander Dallas Bache – Army engineer and second superintendent of the United States Coast Survey.
- Pierre G. T. Beauregard – Confederate Civil War general.
- Simon Bernard – French army general, military engineer under Napoleon and designer of Fort Adams.
- Ambrose Burnside – Civil War general, Governor of Rhode Island and United States Senator.
- Fox Conner – AEF Operations Officer in the First World War and mentor to General and President Dwight Eisenhower.
- George W. Cullum – Civil War general and Superintendent of West Point.
- Henry A. du Pont – Medal of Honor recipient, president of the Wilmington & Northern Railroad Company and United States Senator.
- Dwight Eisenhower – Vacationed at Fort Adams while he was president.
- William P. Ennis – Army lieutenant general born at Fort Adams.
- Robley D. Evans – Navy rear admiral and commander of the Great White Fleet.
- John G. Foster – Civil War general.
- William Gates – long serving Army officer.
- John Henry – First commander of Fort Adams and adventurer.
- Henry Jackson Hunt – Civil War general and artillery commander at the Battle of Gettysburg.
- Lyman Lemnitzer – Army general and Chairman of the Joint Chiefs of Staff.
- John B. Magruder – Confederate Civil War general.
- Franklin Pierce – General, Senator and President of the United States.
- William S. Rosecrans – Civil War general.
- Isaac Ingalls Stevens – Civil War general.
- Thomas W. Sherman – Civil War general.
- Joseph G. Totten – Oversaw construction of Fort Adams and Chief Engineer of the United States Army.
- Louis de Tousard – Revolutionary War hero and designer of the first Fort Adams.
- Thornton Wilder – Author. Parts of his book Theophilus North were inspired by his experiences while stationed at Fort Adams during the First World War.
- William Griffith Wilson – Best known as "Bill W". Founder of Alcoholics Anonymous. Stationed at Fort Adams during the First World War.

== Gallery ==
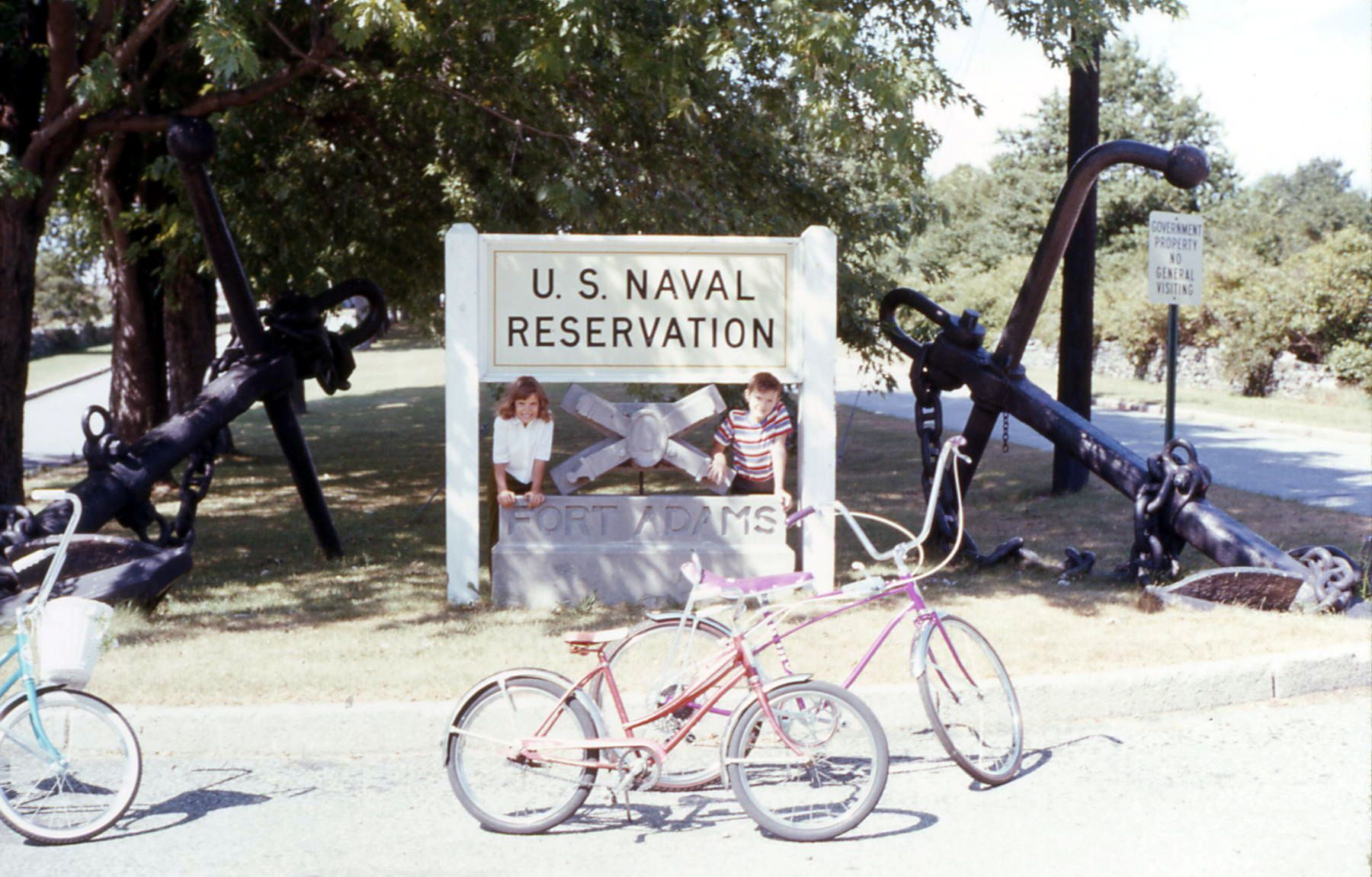
Entrance, 1968

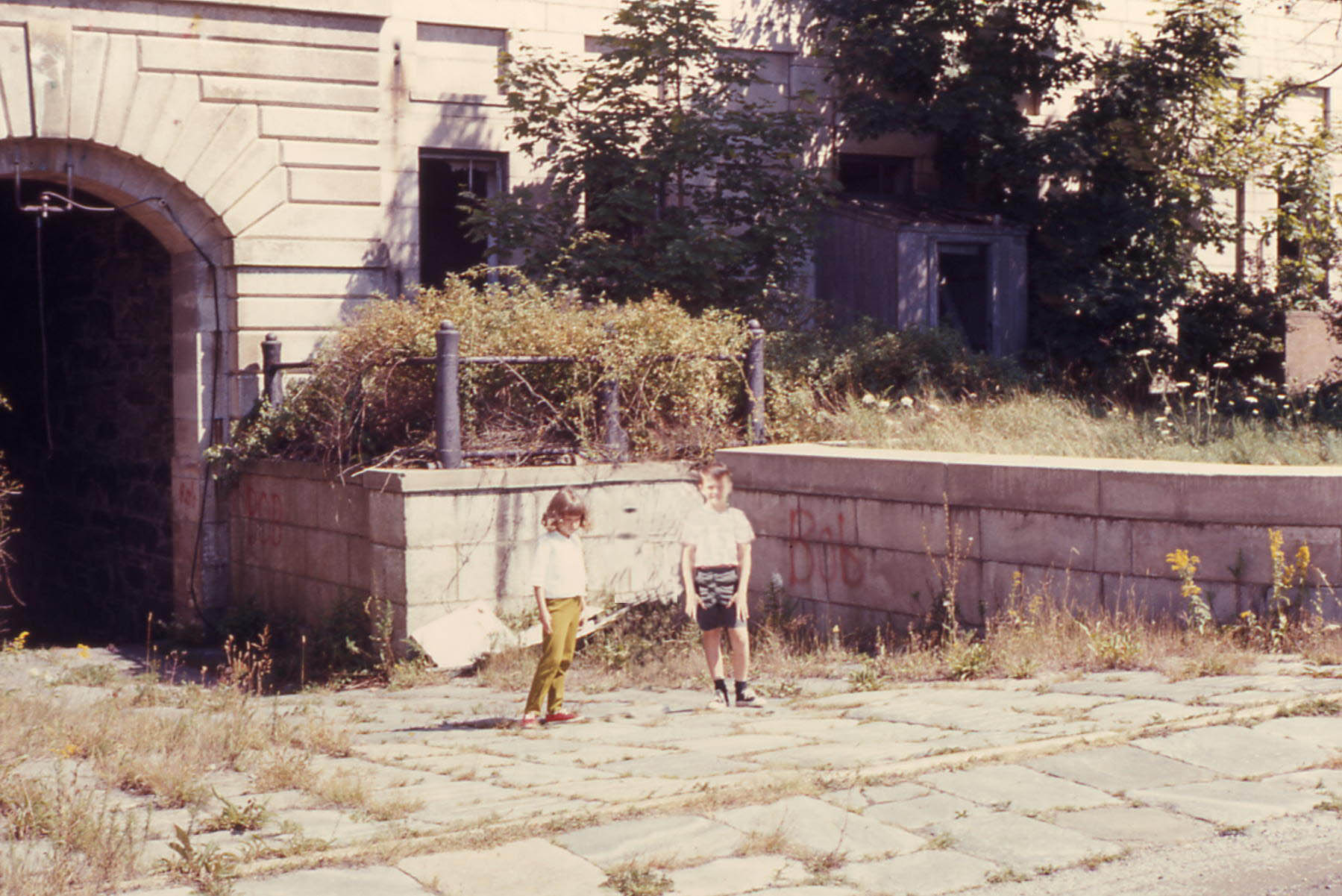
1968

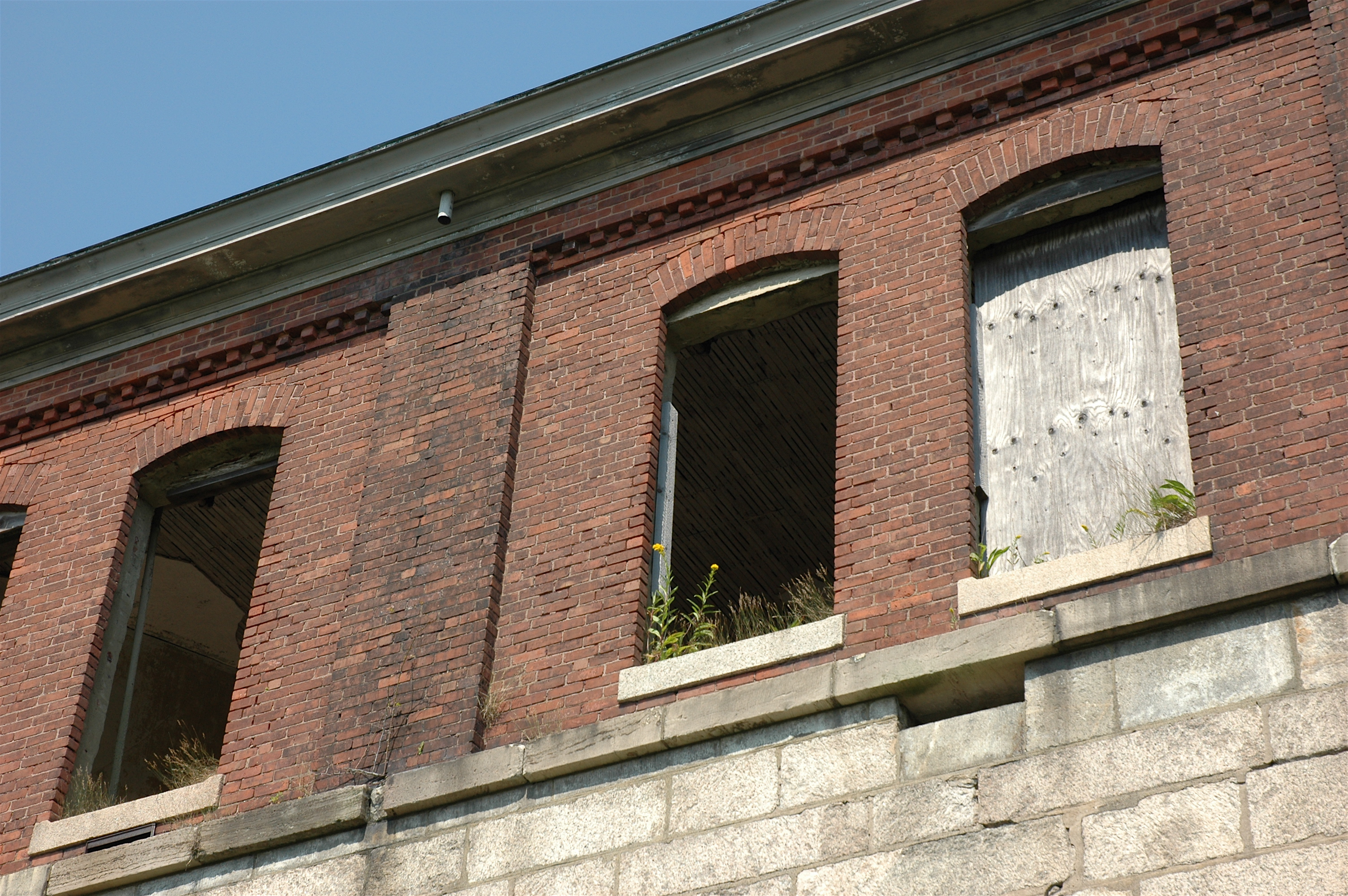

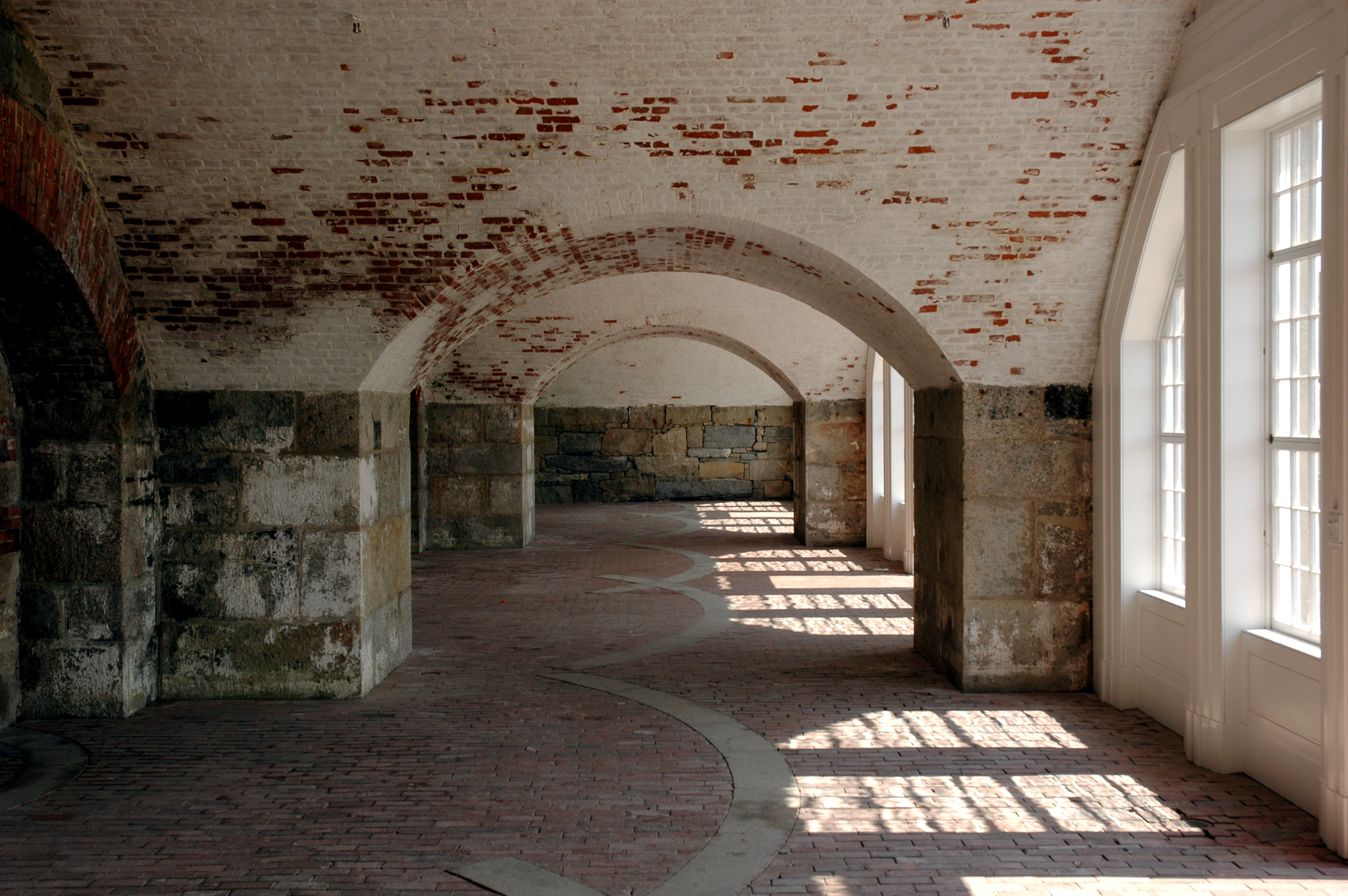

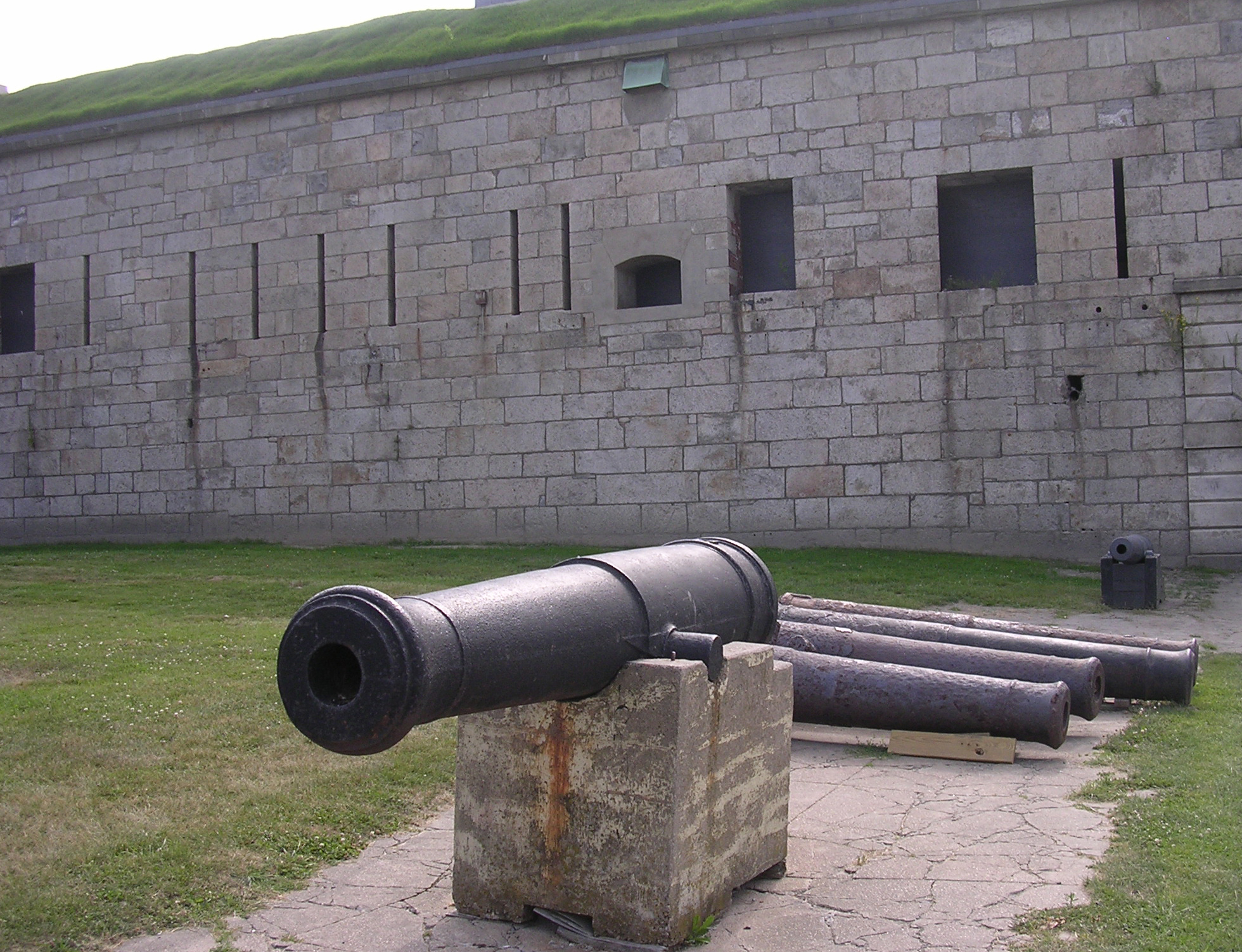

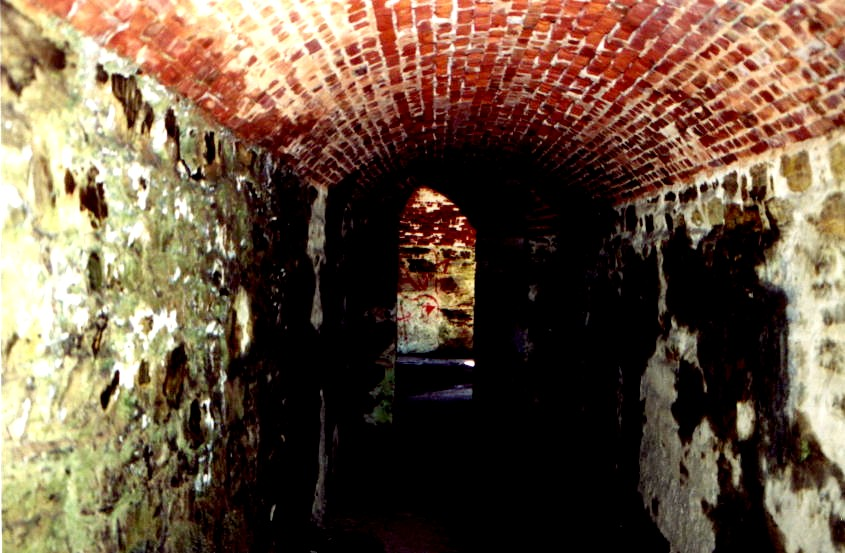
Tunnel

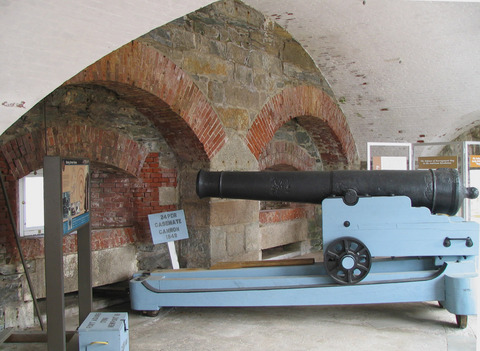

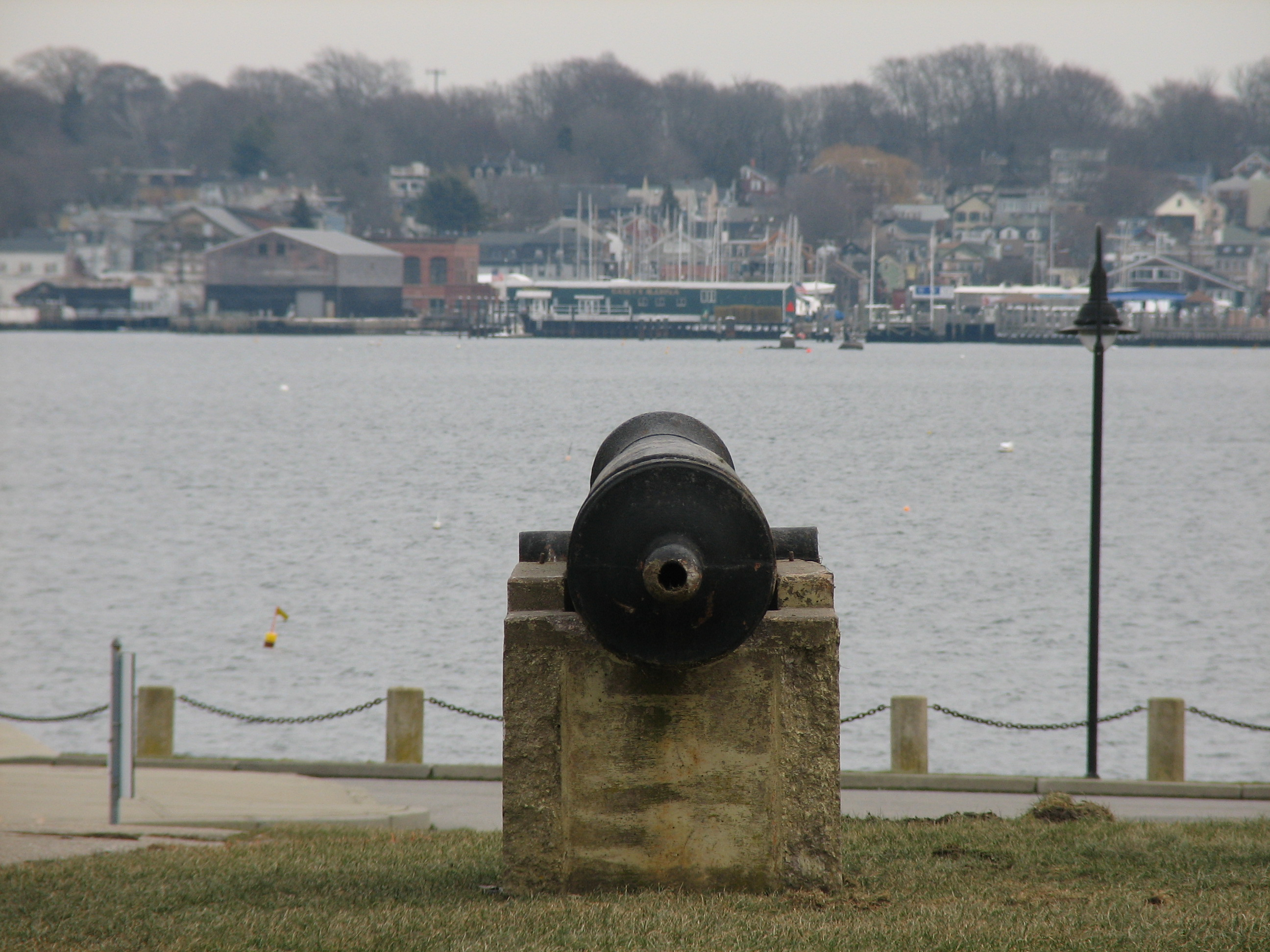

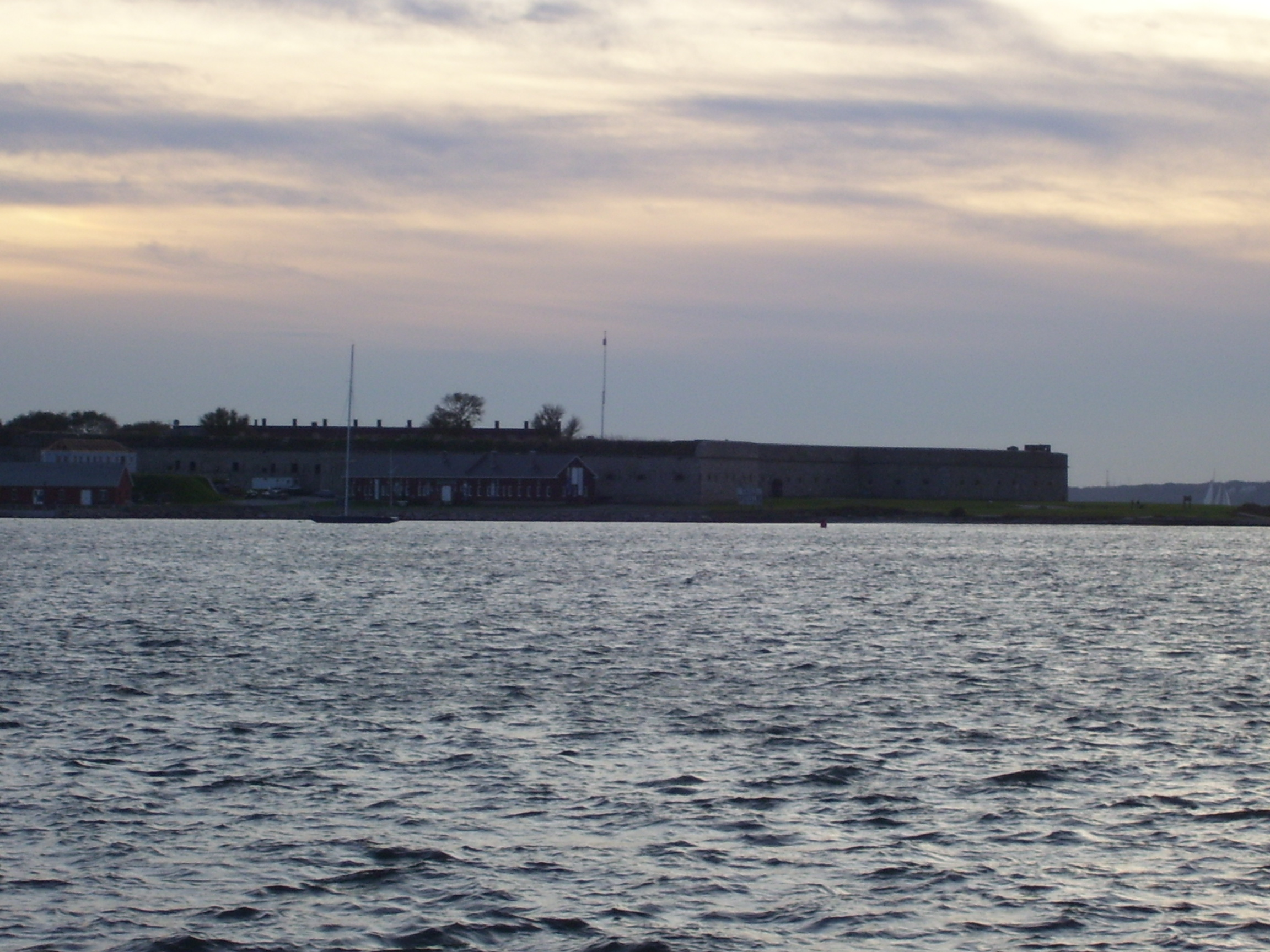
Fort Adams in 2008

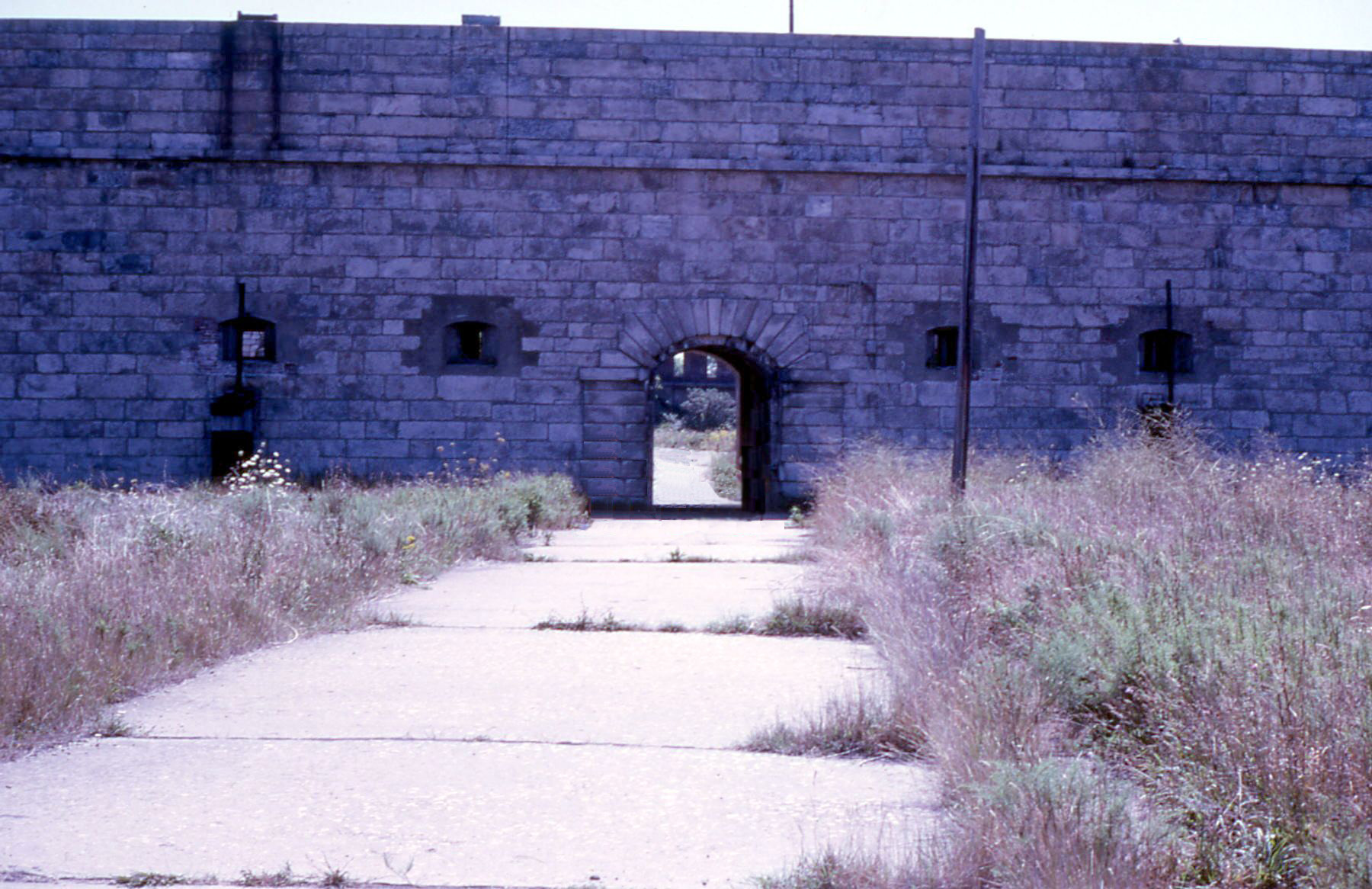
Neglected section, 1968

== See also ==
- 10th Coast Artillery (United States)
- United States Army Coast Artillery Corps
- Seacoast defense in the United States
- Naval Station Newport
- List of National Historic Landmarks in Rhode Island
- National Register of Historic Places listings in Newport County, Rhode Island
