= Balanced Budget Amendment Task Force =

American political action committee

Balanced Budget Amendment Inc.
- Formation: August 2010; 16 years ago
- Type: 501(c)(4)
- Tax ID no.: 27-1351108
- Purpose: Advocating for a balanced-budget amendment
- Location: Palm City, Florida
- Website: bba4usa.org

The Balanced Budget Amendment Task Force is a conservative Florida-based lobbying organization supporting a balanced-budget amendment to the United States Constitution.

The group advocates an Article V convention to include such an amendment. An Article V convention is convened at the request of two-thirds of the states. Twenty-seven have made the request. Thirty-four are needed and then thirty-eight states would be needed for ratification of any proposed amendments.

== States requesting a convention ==
1. Alabama
2. Alaska
3. Arizona
4. Arkansas
5. Florida
6. Georgia
7. Indiana
8. Iowa
9. Kansas
10. Louisiana
11. Michigan
12. Mississippi
13. Missouri
14. Nebraska
15. New Hampshire
16. North Carolina
17. North Dakota
18. Ohio
19. Oklahoma
20. Pennsylvania
21. South Dakota
22. Tennessee
23. Texas
24. Utah
25. West Virginia
26. Wisconsin
27. Wyoming

== States rejecting a convention ==
1. Colorado
2. Delaware
3. Maryland
4. Nevada
5. New Mexico
