= William Gates (soldier) =

American Union Army colonel and general (1788–1868)

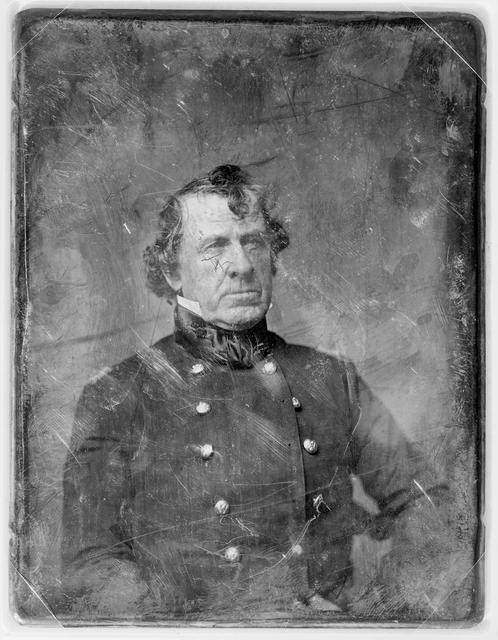
- William Gates
- Born: April 6, 1788; Gloucester, Massachusetts, U.S.
- Died: October 7, 1868 (aged 80); New York City, U.S.
- Burial place: Cypress Hills National Cemetery in Brooklyn, King's County, New York (state)
- Military career
- Allegiance: United States of America; Union
- Branch: United States Army; Union Army
- Service years: 1806–1867
- Rank: Colonel; Brevet Brigadier General
- Conflicts: War of 1812; Battle of York; Battle of Fort George; Second Seminole War; Battles of the Loxahatchee; Mexican-American War; American Civil War

William Gates (6 April 1788 – 7 October 1868) was a long serving career United States Army officer who served on active duty from when he entered West Point as a cadet in 1801 until his final retirement in 1867. He was a veteran of the War of 1812, Seminole Wars, the Mexican War and the American Civil War, to which he was called to duty at the age of 73.

== Early life ==
He was born on 6 April 1788 in Gloucester, Massachusetts. He was the son of Captain Lemuel Gates, a veteran of the Revolutionary War, and attended Phillips Academy in Andover, Massachusetts, graduating in 1800.

== Military career ==
Gates was one of the first cadets at the United States Military Academy at West Point when he was appointed as a cadet on 2 March 1801. He graduated on 6 March 1806, and was commissioned in the Army as a second lieutenant in the Regiment of Artillerists. He was the 11th cadet to graduate West Point and was ranked first in the Class of 1806.

He served in garrison at forts along the Atlantic seaboard from 1806 to 1812. He was promoted to first lieutenant on 3 November 1807.

=== War of 1812 ===
In the War of 1812 he served as acting adjutant of Regiment of Light Artillery, and Aide-de-camp to Brevet Brigadier General Moses Porter in 1813, being engaged in the capture of York (now Toronto) in Upper Canada on 27 April 1813. He was promoted to captain on 3 March 1813.

Gates then participated in the bombardment and capture of Fort George on 27 May 1813.

He was placed in command of Fort Independence, Massachusetts from 1813 to 1815. This coincided with British capturing Castine, Maine in 1814 which created the fear that any part of the New England coast might be subject to attack but no attacks were made against Massachusetts. The war ended with the news of the Treaty of Ghent had been signed in early 1815.

=== Middle career ===
Gates was in garrison at Fort Niagara, New York from 1815 to 1820. He spent the next several years at various posts in New York state including Madison Barracks in Sackett's Harbor from 1820 to 1821; Plattsburg from 1821 to 1824; Fort Lafayette from 1824 to 1826 and Fort Columbus on Governor's Island from 1826 to 1827.

He was awarded a brevet (honorary promotion) to the rank of major on March 3, 1823, for "Faithful Service Ten Years in one Grade".

He next series of assignments brought him south and included Fort McHenry in Maryland in 1827; Fort Marion in Florida from 1827 to 1829; Fort Moultrie near Charleston, South Carolina in 1829 and Fort Marion, Florida from 1829 to 1832.

Gates was promoted to major of 1st Artillery Regiment on May 30, 1832. He was assigned to Fort Monroe, Virginia (where he served as the major of Artillery School for Practice), in 1832 and then to Charleston, South Carolina, from 1832‑33, (which was during South Carolina's threatened nullification) and again to Fort Moultrie from 1833‑35.

=== Seminole War ===
He was assigned to Fort Washington, Maryland from 1835 to 1836 and then served in the Seminole War in Florida from 1836 to 1838. He fought against the Seminole Indians in defense of Fort Barnwell (Volusia) on April 12, 1836. In June of that year he was court-martialed for cowardice, having failed to retrieve the bodies of slain soldiers outside his bulwark, resulting in their being mutilated by the Seminoles.

Gates transferred to the 2nd Artillery Regiment on August 4, 1836. He was promoted to lieutenant colonel of the 3d Artillery on 17 December 1836.

Gates arrested Seminole leader Osceola on October 21, 1837 during peace negotiations at Fort Marion (a.k.a. Castillo San Marcos) in St. Augustine, Florida. Osceola was sent to Fort Moultrie near Charleston, South Carolina where he died a few weeks later. He was in the combat of Locha-Hatchee on January 24, 1838, in the Cherokee Nation, while transferring the Indians to the West. He returned to Florida from 1839 to 1842 and served in garrison at Fort Pickens.

=== War with Mexico ===
He served at Fort Moultrie from 1842‑43 and in Savannah, Georgia from 1843 to 1844 before returning to Fort Moultrie from 1844 to 1846. He was promoted to colonel in command of the 3rd Artillery Regiment on 13 October 1845 which made him one of the highest-ranking officers in the Army. He served in the War with Mexico, from 1846 to 1848, as Governor of Tampico, Mexico. He served as the commander of Fort Adams in Newport, Rhode Island from 1848 to 1853.

=== Wreck of SS San Francisco ===
Late in 1853 Gates and his regiment were ordered to be stationed in California. Gates was on board, along with hundreds of his soldiers and their families, the ill-fated steamer SS San Francisco when it was wrecked in a storm on 24 December 1853. An investigation of the incident found Gates to be delinquent in this duties and he was placed on waiting orders (i.e. with no active assignment) from 1854 until 1861.

=== Civil War service ===
With the outbreak of the Civil War in April 1861 the Union needed to maximize its resources and Gates was given an active assignment, despite being 73 years old. In December 1861 he assumed command of Fort Trumbull in New London, Connecticut. He was retired from the Army on 1 June 1863, under the retirement law of 17 July 1862, for having served in the Army for more than 45 years. Due to wartime needs, however, he continued to command Fort Trumbull until he was reassigned in March 1864 to Fort Constitution near Portsmouth, New Hampshire. He remained at Fort Constitution until his full retirement in 1867 after 66 years of military service.

After the Civil War, Gates was breveted as a brigadier general for "Long and Faithful Service in the Army" to rank from March 13, 1865.

== Death ==
General Gates died in New York City on 7 October 1868, at the age of 80.
