= Henry letters =

The Henry Letters were correspondence by a fraudster named John Henry with the Governor General of Canada, Sir James Craig in 1809. The letters documented Henry's efforts to determine Federalist sympathies to have the New England states leave the United States and join the British Empire. A bundle of letters was sold to President James Madison for $50,000. The letters were fraudulent, but both the President and his fellow Republicans in Congress were deceived on the eve of the War of 1812.

Henry left the United States for France shortly before the letters were made public on March 9, 1812 in a message to Congress by President Madison.

Historians have been sharply critical of Madison's actions. Leopold writes, "In buying sight unseen, in February, 1812, the worthless Henry letters at the cost of a badly needed frigate in order to expose the supposed intrigues of the New England Federalists, Madison and Secretary of State Monroe looked like fools as well as knaves."

== See also ==
- Origins of the War of 1812
- Cadore Letter
