= United States policy responses to the Great Recession =

United States policy responses to the late-2000s recession explores legislation, banking industry and market volatility within retirement plans.

The Federal Reserve, Treasury, and Securities and Exchange Commission took several steps on September 19, 2008, to intervene in the crisis caused by the late-2000s recession. To stop the potential run on money market mutual funds, the Treasury also announced that same day a new $50 billion program to insure the investments, similar to the Federal Deposit Insurance Corporation (FDIC) program. Part of the announcements included temporary exceptions to section 23A and 23B (Regulation W), allowing financial groups to more easily share funds within their group. The exceptions would expire on January 30, 2009, unless extended by the Federal Reserve Board. The Securities and Exchange Commission announced termination of short-selling of 799 financial stocks, as well as action against naked short selling, as part of its reaction to the mortgage crisis.

== Market volatility within US 401(k) and retirement plans ==
The US Pension Protection Act of 2006 included a provision which changed the definition of Qualified Default Investments (QDI) for retirement plans from stable value investments, money market funds, and cash investments to investments which expose an individual to appropriate levels of stock and bond risk based on the years left to retirement. The Act required that Plan Sponsors move the assets of individuals who had never actively elected their investments and had their contributions in the default investment option. This meant that individuals who had defaulted into a cash fund with little fluctuation or growth would soon have their account balances moved to much more aggressive investments.

Starting in early 2008, most US employer-sponsored plans sent notices to their employees informing them that the plan default investment was changing from a cash/stable option to something new, such as a retirement date fund which had significant market exposure. Most participants ignored these notices until September and October, when the market crash was on every news station and media outlet. It was then that participants called their 401(k) and retirement plan providers and discovered losses in excess of 30% in some cases. Call centers for 401(k) providers experienced record call volume and wait times, as millions of inexperienced investors struggled to understand how their investments had been changed so fundamentally without their explicit consent, and reacted in a panic by liquidating everything with any stock or bond exposure, locking in huge losses in their accounts.

Due to the speculation and uncertainty in the market, discussion forums filled with questions about whether or not to liquidate assets and financial gurus were swamped with questions about the right steps to take to protect what remained of their retirement accounts. During the third quarter of 2008, over $72 billion (~$103 billion in 2024) left mutual fund investments that invested in stocks or bonds and rushed into Stable Value investments in the month of October. Against the advice of financial experts, and ignoring historical data illustrating that long-term balanced investing has produced positive returns in all types of markets, investors with decades to retirement instead sold their holdings during one of the largest drops in stock market history.

== Loans to banks for asset-backed commercial paper ==
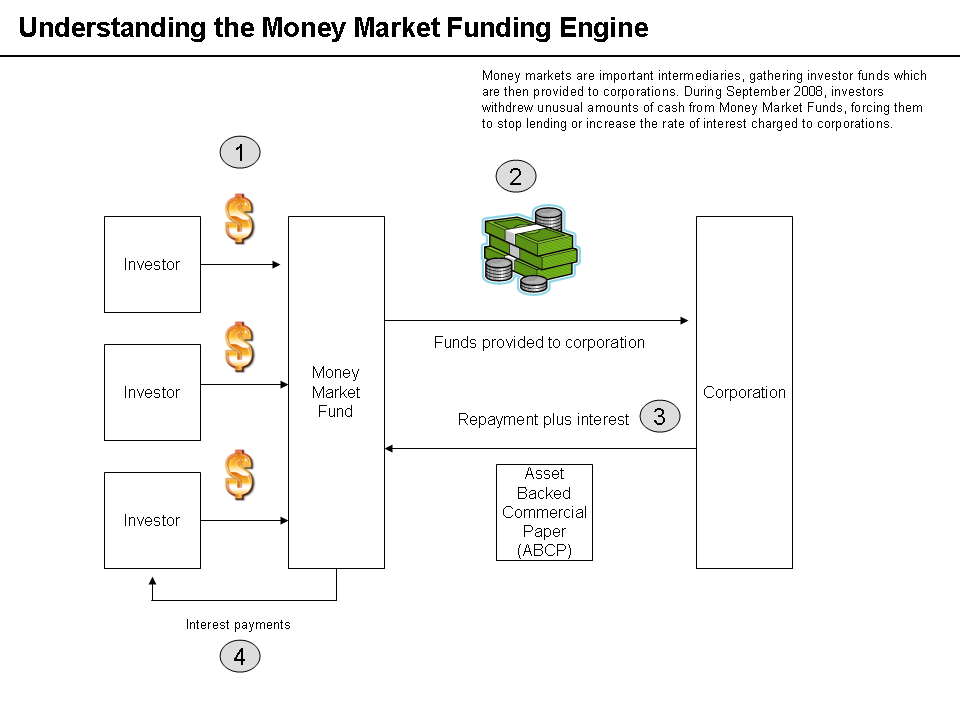
How money markets fund corporations

During the week ending September 19, 2008, money market funds had begun to experience significant withdrawals of funds by investors. This created a significant risk because money market funds are integral to the ongoing financing of corporations of all types. Individual investors lend money to money market funds, which then provide the funds to corporations in exchange for corporate short-term securities called asset-backed commercial paper (ABCP). However, a potential bank run had begun on certain money market funds. If this situation had worsened, the ability of major corporations to secure needed short-term financing through ABCP issuance would have been significantly affected. To assist with liquidity throughout the system, the US Treasury and Federal Reserve Bank announced that banks could obtain funds via the Federal Reserve's Discount Window using ABCP as collateral.

== Federal Reserve lowers interest rates ==
Federal reserve rates changes (Just data after January 1, 2008)
Date	Discount rate	Discount rate	Discount rate	Fed funds	Fed funds rate
		Primary	Secondary		
	rate change	new interest rate	new interest rate	rate change	new interest rate
October 8, 2008*	-0.50%	1.75%	2.25%	-0.50%	1.50%
April 30, 2008	-0.25%	2.25%	2.75%	-0.25%	2.00%
March 18, 2008	-0.75%	2.50%	3.00%	-0.75%	2.25%
March 16, 2008	-0.25%	3.25%	3.75%		
January 30, 2008	-0.50%	3.50%	4.00%	-0.50%	3.00%
January 22, 2008	-0.75%	4.00%	4.50%	-0.75%	3.50%

–→ * Part of a coordinated global rate cut of 50 basis point by main central banks.

– See more detailed US federal discount rate chart:

== Legislation ==
The Secretary of the United States Treasury, Henry Paulson and President George W. Bush proposed legislation for the government to purchase up to US$700 billion of "troubled mortgage-related assets" from financial firms in hopes of improving confidence in the mortgage-backed securities markets and the financial firms participating in it. Discussion, hearings and meetings among legislative leaders and the administration later made clear that the proposal would undergo significant change before it could be approved by Congress. On October 1, a revised compromise version was approved by the Senate with a 74–25 vote. The bill, HR1424 was passed by the House on October 3, 2008, and signed into law. The first half of the bailout money was primarily used to buy preferred stock in banks instead of troubled mortgage assets.

In January 2009, the Obama administration announced a stimulus plan to revive the economy with the intention to create or save more than 3.6 million jobs in two years. The cost of this initial recovery plan was estimated at 825 billion dollars (5.8% of GDP). The plan included 365.5 billion dollars to be spent on major policy and reform of the health system, 275 billion (through tax rebates) to be redistributed to households and firms, notably those investing in renewable energy, 94 billion to be dedicated to social assistance for the unemployed and families, 87 billion of direct assistance to states to help them finance health expenditures of Medicaid, and finally 13 billion spent to improve access to digital technologies. The administration also attributed of 13.4 billion dollars aid to automobile manufacturers General Motors and Chrysler, but this plan is not included in the stimulus plan.

== Federal Reserve response ==
In an effort to increase available funds for commercial banks and lower the fed funds rate, on September 29, 2008, the U.S. Federal Reserve announced plans to double its Term Auction Facility to $300 billion (~$428 billion in 2024). Because there appeared to be a shortage of U.S. dollars in Europe at that time, the Federal Reserve also announced it would increase its swap facilities with foreign central banks from $290 billion to $620 billion.

On November 25, 2008, the Fed announced it would buy $800 billion (~$1.14 trillion in 2024) of debt and mortgage backed securities, in a fund separate from the 700-billion dollar Troubled Asset Relief Program (TARP) that was originally passed by Congress. According to the BBC, the Fed used the fund to buy $100 billion in debt from Fannie Mae and Freddie Mac and $500 billion in Mortgage-backed securities. The fund would also be used to loan $200 billion to the holders of securities backed by various types of consumer loans, such as credit cards and student loans, to help unfreeze the consumer debt market. According to a Des Moines Register editorial, it is not clear whether bodies that oversee the TARP will oversee Paulson's control of the Fed's $800 billion loan and bond actions.

As of December 24, 2008, the Federal Reserve had used its independent authority to spend $1.2 trillion on purchasing various financial assets and making emergency loans to address the financial crisis, far beyond the $700 billion authorized by Congress from the federal budget. This included emergency loans to banks, credit card companies, and general businesses, temporary swaps of treasury bills for mortgage-backed securities, the sale of Bear Stearns, and the bailouts of American International Group (AIG), Fannie Mae and Freddie Mac, and Citigroup.

In May 2013, as the stock market was hitting record highs and the housing and employment markets were improving slightly, the prospect of the Federal Reserve beginning to decrease its economic stimulus activities began to enter the projections of investment analysts and affected global markets.
