= John Henry (spy) =

British spy

John Henry (c. 1776 – 1853) was a spy and adventurer of mysterious origins. He sold documents called the Henry letters to the United States suggesting treason by Federalists on the eve of the War of 1812 with Great Britain. The Henry letters helped build outrage against Britain which led to the United States declaring war in June 1812.

== Early life ==
It is reputed that Henry was born to a well to do family in Dublin, Ireland, probably in the 1770s. (One source states his age in 1812 was 36 indicating he was born about 1776.)

As a younger son, Henry was not entitled to an inheritance and, about 1790, left for the United States to join an elderly uncle named Daniel McCormick, Esq. in New York. (Some sources say his name was McGillivary, others Keane.)

Henry was described as being 5 feet 9 inches tall, blonde and "very handsome".

Henry came to Philadelphia about 1793 and edited a newspaper, Brown's Philadelphia Gazette.

== Military service ==
When Henry's financial prospects soured, Henry obtained, through the influence of the British minister to the United States, a commission as a captain in the United States Army, on June 1, 1798. This was during the Quasi-War with France, when the Army was undergoing a great expansion. Henry commanded an artillery company, under Brigadier General Ebenezer Stevens of the New York Militia, while he served as commanding officer of Fort Wood on Bedloe's Island (now Liberty Island) in New York Harbor. He later served at Fort Jay on Governor's Island.

In the Spring of 1799, Henry and his company were ordered to deploy to Northampton County, Pennsylvania to aid in suppressing Fries's Rebellion against Federal taxation.

Henry was the first commander of Fort Adams in Newport, Rhode Island, when the fort was first garrisoned on July 4, 1799. Near the end of 1800 he was transferred to Fort Sumner in Portland, Maine. He served at Portland until he resigned from the Army at the end of 1801.

== Political intrigues ==
Henry settled on a farm in northern Vermont, and also studied law. Here he remained five years studying law and, occasionally, writing articles for the press against the republican form of government.

These attracted the attention of Sir James Craig, then Governor-General of Canada, who employed him in 1809 to find out the extent of the reported disaffection to the U.S. government in New England. Henry spent three months in Boston in this employment, living at the Exchange Coffee House. He reported constantly to Craig by letter, and at one time thought that in the event of war between Great Britain and the United States, Massachusetts would take the lead in establishing a northern confederacy, which might, in the end, ally itself with Great Britain.

Craig promised Henry office in Canada, but died soon afterward, and the spy's efforts to obtain his reward in London, meeting with no success, he returned to the United States. En route to the United States in September 1811, he made the acquaintance of one Comte Edouard de Crillon who Henry took into his confidence and to whom he explained the entire affair. De Crillon suggested that Henry sell the correspondence to President Madison as Madison was seeking grounds on which to declare war on Britain. In reality, De Crillon was not a French count, but a notorious con artist whose real name was Paul Émile Soubiran.

Henry, on February 10, 1812, sold the documents, called the Henry Papers, to President James Madison, who paid him $50,000 for his information, the other $40,000 of his reward to be guaranteed by the deed to an ancestral estate of de Crillon's. (Some sources state that Henry gave the bulk of the cash to de Crillon in exchange for the deed to de Crillon's estate in France named St. Martial.)

Henry sailed from New York for France aboard the sloop USS Wasp on March 9, 1812. The estate in Gascony granted by the "Count de Crillon" did not exist, as Crillon proved to be an impostor - possibly in the employ of Emperor Napoleon to help distract the United Kingdom in a war with the United States prior to his invasion of Russia.

His disclosures, although considered by some to be fraudulent, were believed by President Madison and his Republican Party. They were made the subject of a special message to Congress, and created much excitement throughout the country. Some Federalists alleged that it was all a political trick that had been devised by the President to cause war with Great Britain.

Historians have been sharply critical of Madison. Richard Leopold wrote, "In buying sight unseen, in February, 1812, the worthless Henry letters at the cost of a badly needed frigate in order to expose the supposed intrigues of the New England Federalists, Madison and Secretary of State Monroe looked like fools as well as knaves."

== Later life ==
The last known report of Henry was that he was employed in 1820 by King George IV to spy on the king's wife, Caroline of Brunswick, while she was living in Rome. George was eager to divorce Caroline because of her suspected adultery of which proof was needed to obtain a legal divorce. Details of Henry's later life are few, but he is believed to have died in Paris in 1853.

== Family ==
Henry married Elizabeth Sophia Duché (born on September 18, 1774, in Philadelphia) on May 23, 1799, at Christ Church in Philadelphia. She was the daughter of Reverend Jacob Duché - a once-prominent Episcopal priest at Christ Church and the first official chaplain of the Continental Congress who later went over to the British side and was convicted of high treason against the state of Pennsylvania.

Elizabeth bore him two daughters, Sophia-Duché Henry (b. 1799, d. about 1829) and Elisabeth-Blois Henry (b. 1802, d. after 1882), prior to her untimely death on December 11, 1808, in Montreal at the age of 34.

Elisabeth-Blois Henry married Adolphe de Chanal (who later became a brigadier general in the French army and served in the Franco-Prussian War) on February 24, 1844, in Nantes, France.

When John Henry died, his daughter Elisabeth-Blois inherited his fortune estimated at 319,836 francs. With half of this sum, Elisabeth-Blois and her husband Adolphe de Chanal bought the castle of Sédières in the department of Corrèze in France.

== See also ==
- Henry letters
