= Budgetary universality =

Budgetary universality, also called the principle of budget universality, is a principle of public finance under which the revenue of a government budget finances its expenditure as a whole. Individual revenue streams are generally not earmarked for particular purposes. In French budget law, universality also requires revenue and expenditure to be recorded at their gross amounts, without offsetting one against the other. These two requirements are known as non-affectation and non-compensation or non-contraction, respectively.

The principle supports parliamentary control over public finances by making the amounts received and spent visible and by allowing spending priorities to be considered across the budget. Both French and German law provide exceptions permitting particular receipts to be reserved for specified expenditure.

== France ==
In France, budgetary universality is one of the principles governing the state budget. Its two rules were set out in article 18 of the organic ordinance of 2 January 1959. They are now expressed in article 6 of the Organic Law on Finance Acts (Loi organique relative aux lois de finances, LOLF) of 1 August 2001.

=== Gross budgeting and non-earmarking ===
The gross-budgeting rule requires the full amount of each receipt and expenditure to appear in the budget. A service cannot deduct the revenue it expects to collect from its planned expenditure and present only the difference for parliamentary approval. This allows Parliament to scrutinise the scale of the operations concerned. The rule also prevents a service from using receipts to supplement its spending without the necessary budgetary authority.

Under the rule against earmarking, receipts enter a common pool from which expenditure is financed. Collecting revenue does not, by itself, entitle the service concerned to spend it. The rule has also been applied to the use of state property. In 1940, the Court of Accounts held that using wood from the grounds of the Palace of Versailles to heat its buildings breached budgetary universality. A specific legal provision was subsequently adopted to permit this use. Criticism of non-earmarking has concerned administrative complexity and the difficulty of justifying a tax by linking it to a particular use.

Article 16 of the LOLF allows revenue to be assigned to expenditure through annexed budgets, special accounts and designated accounting procedures.

=== Special accounting procedures ===
Article 17 of the LOLF provides three procedures for earmarking within the general budget, an annexed budget or a special account:

- Fonds de concours are non-tax contributions from individuals or public or private bodies towards expenditure in the public interest, including gifts and bequests to the state. The contribution is recorded as revenue, and the finance minister opens an additional appropriation of the same amount for the relevant programme or allocation. The money must be used in accordance with the contributor's intentions.
- Attribution de produits allows fees for services regularly supplied by a state service to finance that service. The procedure is authorised by decree and follows the rules applicable to fonds de concours.
- Rétablissement de crédits, or restoration of appropriations, allows certain receipts to replenish appropriations previously used. It applies to repayments of amounts paid in error or provisionally, and to receipts from transfers between state services that were paid for from budget appropriations.

=== Annexed budgets and special accounts ===
An annexed budget (budget annexe) records operations of a state service without separate legal personality whose principal activity is producing goods or supplying services for a fee. A finance act must authorise both its creation and the assignment of revenue to it. Each annexed budget constitutes a budgetary mission and is voted on separately. The two annexed budgets in the 2026 budget documents concern air traffic control and aviation operations (Contrôle et exploitation aériens) and official publications and administrative information (Publications officielles et information administrative).

Special accounts (comptes spéciaux) also require authorisation in a finance act. The LOLF recognises four categories: earmarked accounts (comptes d'affectation spéciale), trading accounts (comptes de commerce), monetary operations accounts (comptes d'opérations monétaires) and financial assistance accounts (comptes de concours financiers). Earmarked accounts finance operations from receipts directly related to the expenditure concerned, while financial assistance accounts record state loans and advances.

Trading and monetary operations accounts are subject to a different form of budgetary authorisation: their revenue and expenditure estimates are indicative, while the authorised overdraft is the binding limit.

=== Earmarked taxes ===
Earmarking also occurs through taxes assigned to bodies outside the general state budget. The contribution pour le remboursement de la dette sociale (CRDS) was created in 1996 to finance the Caisse d'amortissement de la dette sociale (CADES), which repays accumulated social security debt. CADES also receives a share of the general social contribution (CSG).

The broadcasting licence fee was another example of revenue reserved for a specific purpose, funding public broadcasting. It was abolished in 2022.

=== Transfers from state revenue ===
The procedure known as prélèvements sur recettes transfers a specified amount of state revenue directly to local authorities or the European Union. These transfers are deducted from state receipts instead of being recorded as expenditure financed by an appropriation. Article 6 of the LOLF expressly permits them and requires their amounts to be estimated separately and precisely in the finance act.

The Constitutional Council upheld this procedure in its decision of 29 December 1982. It found that listing gross revenue and each deduction in the finance act's schedule A preserved parliamentary scrutiny. The transfers financed obligations of the recipients, rather than expenditure belonging to the state itself. The Council required the amount and destination of each transfer to be clearly identified and adequately explained.

== Germany ==
In German budget law, the principle is known as Gesamtdeckungsprinzip, Grundsatz der Gesamtdeckung or Non-Affektationsprinzip.

The principle applies to both cash-basis accounting, traditionally known in Germany as cameral accounting, and double-entry bookkeeping. It is used in preparing federal, state and municipal budgets, as well as the budgets of bodies constituted under public law, including public broadcasters.

=== Background ===
The presentation of revenue alongside expenditure in a cash-based budget can suggest that particular receipts finance particular expenses. Governments may also associate a tax with a specific spending programme when explaining it to the public. For example, in presenting West Germany's 1959 federal budget, almost all revenue from the mineral oil tax was associated with road construction, despite the principle of budgetary universality.

A comparison for 2005 put Germany's tax receipts at €48 billion and expenditure on road construction at €17.5 billion. These figures excluded spending on parking spaces, street lighting and street cleaning, as well as the external costs of road transport, such as accidents, noise and air pollution, and its external benefits.

=== Purpose and rationale ===
The principle is intended to preserve the discretion of the legislature, or another body responsible for adopting a budget, over the use of public revenue. Pooling receipts leaves room to change spending priorities from one budget to the next. Earmarking can limit that discretion by reserving individual sources of revenue for particular purposes. The rationale is associated with democratic control of public spending and parliament's responsibility for the budget.

=== Budgetary effects ===
In Germany, the rule is set out in section 7 of the Budgetary Principles Act (Haushaltsgrundsätzegesetz, HGrG) and section 8 of the Federal Budget Code (Bundeshaushaltsordnung, BHO). Both provisions establish general coverage of expenditure by revenue while allowing specified exceptions.

Pooling revenue allows spending plans to be made without tying a particular expenditure to the amount collected from a particular tax. It does not prevent revenue and expenditure from being grouped for accounting or analytical purposes. Earmarking, however, restricts the use of the receipts concerned and can make it harder to redirect spending towards higher priorities.

Budgetary universality differs from financing an individual expense through a designated tax or grant. A political statement associating a tax increase with a spending programme does not, by itself, create a binding earmark.

=== Exceptions and earmarking ===
The Budgetary Principles Act and the Federal Budget Code permit revenue to be earmarked where this is prescribed by law or authorised in the budget. Earmarked receipts are then available only for the designated expenditure, rather than forming part of the revenue available to finance the budget as a whole.

Municipal budgets can also contain earmarked revenue. In a 2000 judgment concerning Lower Saxony, the Federal Administrative Court described an exception under section 17(1) of the municipal budget ordinance (Gemeindehaushaltsverordnung, GemHVO) applicable to the case. The court held that a municipality could establish a binding earmark through a note in its budget.

Certain municipal services funded through fees may operate outside the general revenue pool. For example, fees collected by separate municipal bodies responsible for waste disposal or water services may be reserved for the functions assigned to those bodies.

Earmarking can make the relationship between a particular source of revenue and its use easier to trace. Under budgetary universality, a budget identifies expenditure under individual budget items, but does not assign a particular source of revenue to each item. Earmarking is also a feature of public budgeting in the United States.

=== Political debate ===
Governments often present new taxes or tax increases together with proposals for additional expenditure. German examples include:

- The sparkling wine tax introduced in 1902 to help finance the Imperial German Navy.
- The solidarity surcharge introduced in 1991, as part of measures to meet the costs of German reunification and Germany's contribution to the Gulf War.
- The tobacco-tax increases adopted in 2001, alongside an increase in insurance tax, to finance measures against international terrorism.

In the absence of a binding earmark, a change in revenue from a particular tax does not by itself prescribe a corresponding change in the spending programme politically associated with it.

Another debate concerns taxpayers who object to particular uses of public money. The German campaign group Netzwerk Friedenssteuer advocates arrangements under which taxpayers could avoid contributing to military expenditure. In a 2012 decision, the Federal Fiscal Court held that freedom of conscience did not entitle taxpayers to withhold tax payments because they opposed the activities financed by the state. The court distinguished the obligation to pay tax from parliament's authority to decide how the revenue is spent.
