= Ray Moorcroft =

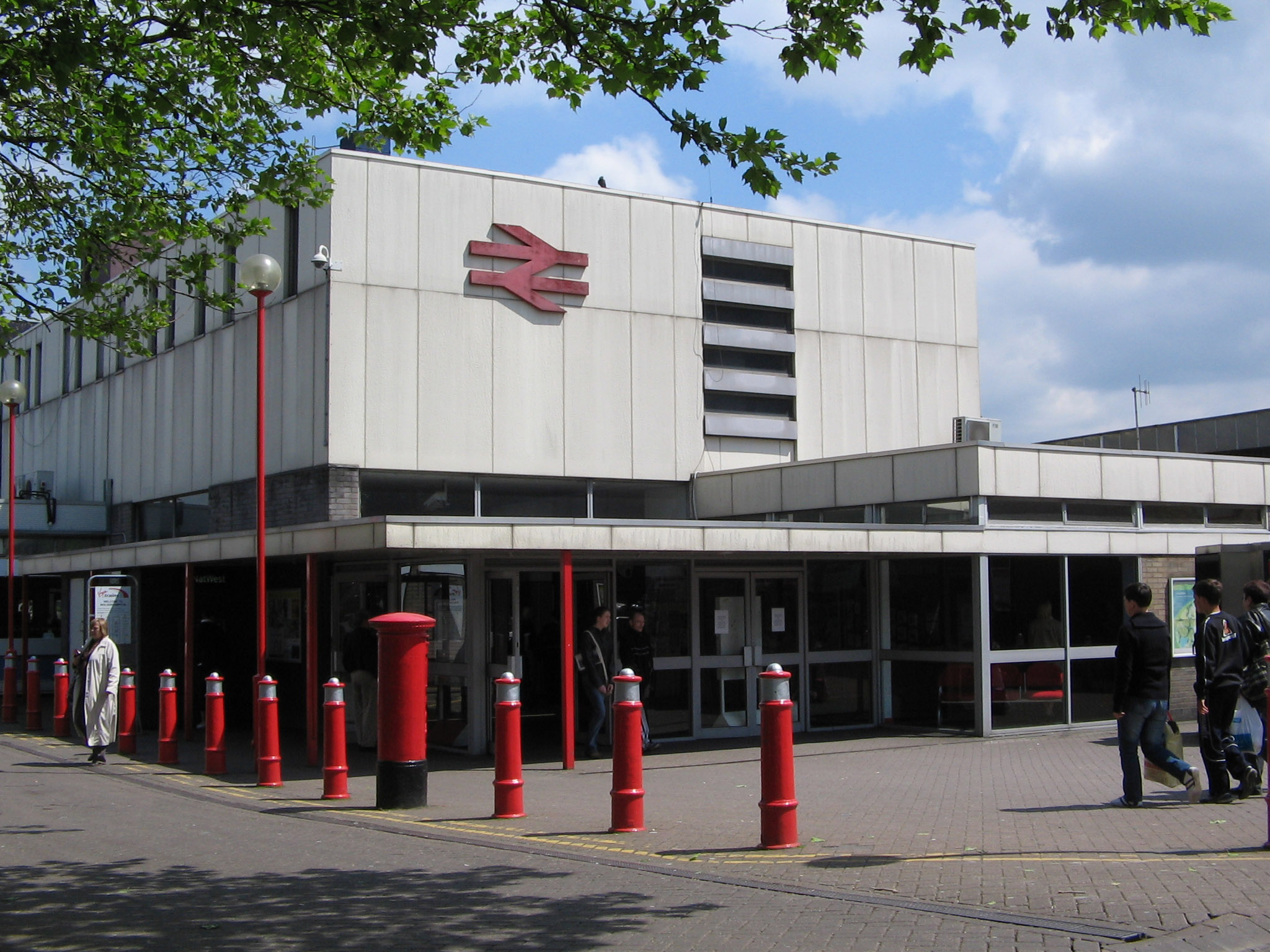
Wolverhampton railway station of 1964-67

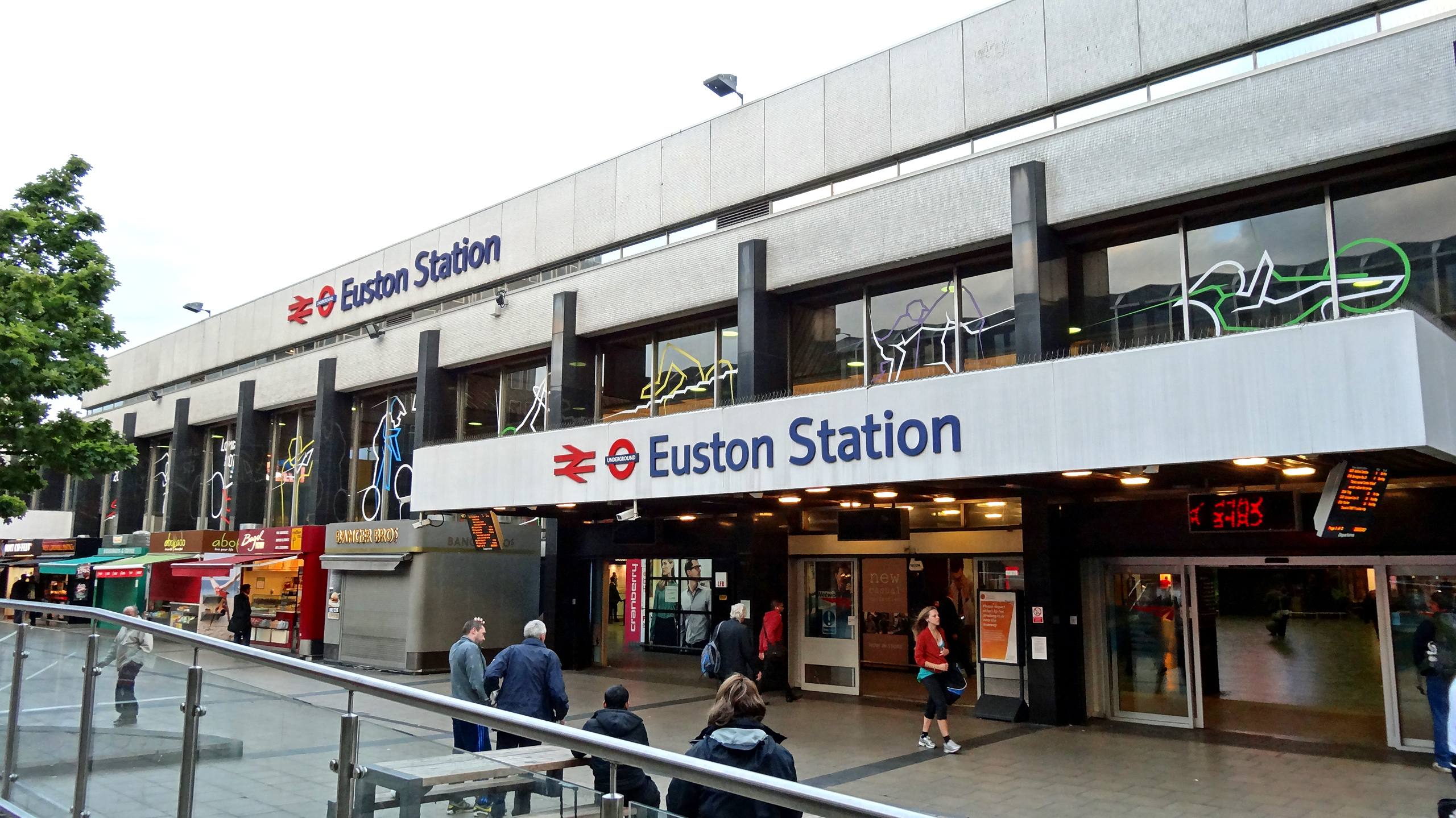
The passenger hall of Euston railway station from 1966-68

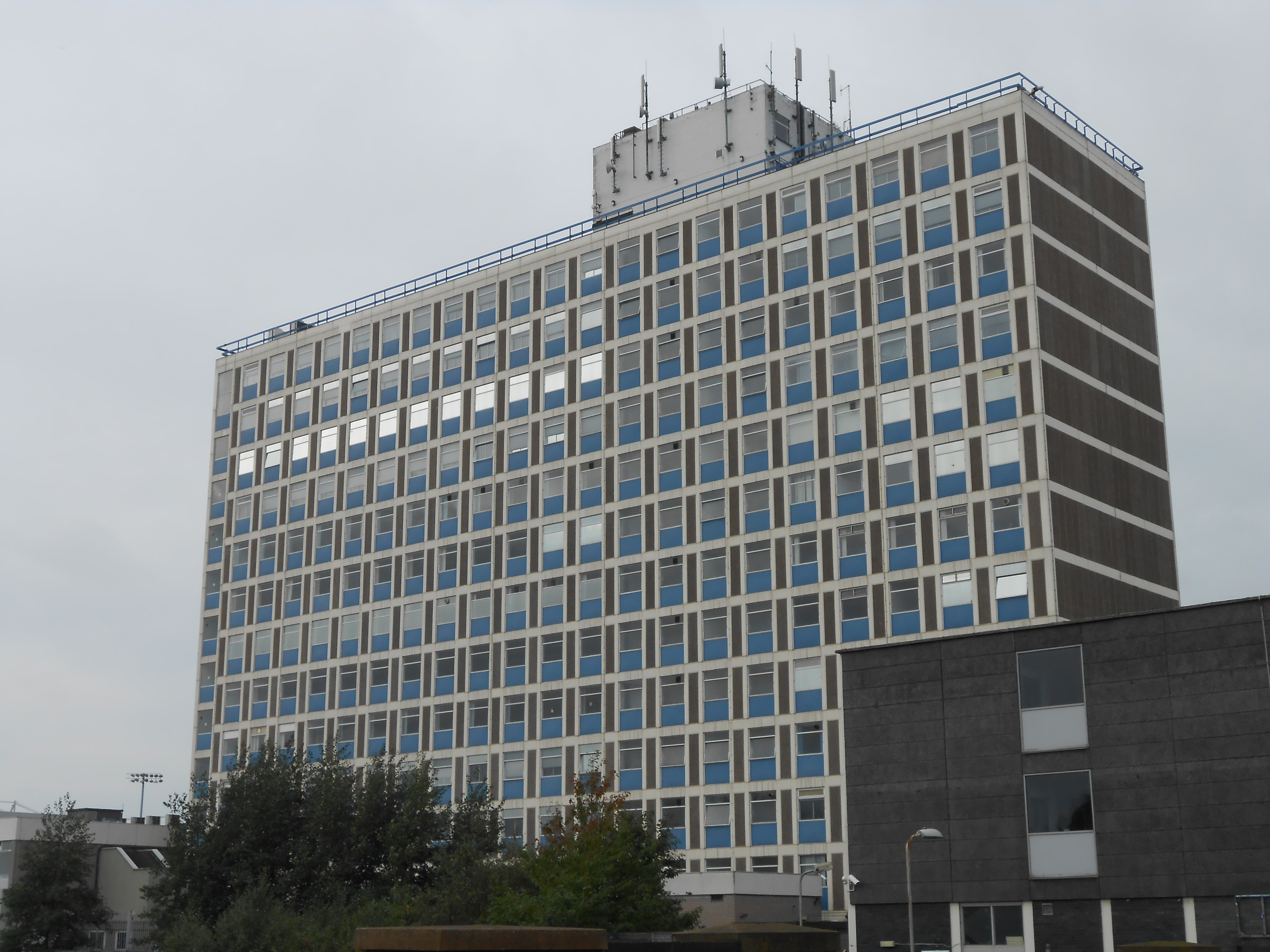
Rail House, Crewe, 1967-68

Roy L Moorcroft FRIBA was chief architect for British Rail from 1977, and is best known for his work on the controversial passenger hall of Euston railway station.

== Career ==
Moorcroft started with British Rail as an architect in the London Midland Region, working with William Robert Headley. He succeeded Bernard Kaukas as Chief Architect to British Rail in 1977, when Kaukas was appointed Director of Environment.

== Works ==
- Esso Petroleum Company, Davies Street, London. 1954 (modernisation)
- Manchester Piccadilly railway station 1959-64
- Railway hostel, Tyseley, Birmingham 1962
- Euston railway station passenger hall, London 1966-68 with William Robert Headley
- Birmingham New Street Signal Box, Birmingham 1966 with John Bicknell and Paul Hamilton (Grade II listed)
- King's Cross railway station, London 1963-68 (rebuilding)
- Wolverhampton railway station 1964-67
- Northampton railway station 1965-66 (rebuilding)
- Rail House, Crewe 1967-68 (with Frederick Francis Charles Curtis)
- Birmingham International railway station 1976

== Publications ==
- Aspects of Railway Architecture 1985
