= Chelford railway station =

Railway station in Cheshire, England

Coordinates: 53.271°N 2.280°W

Chelford
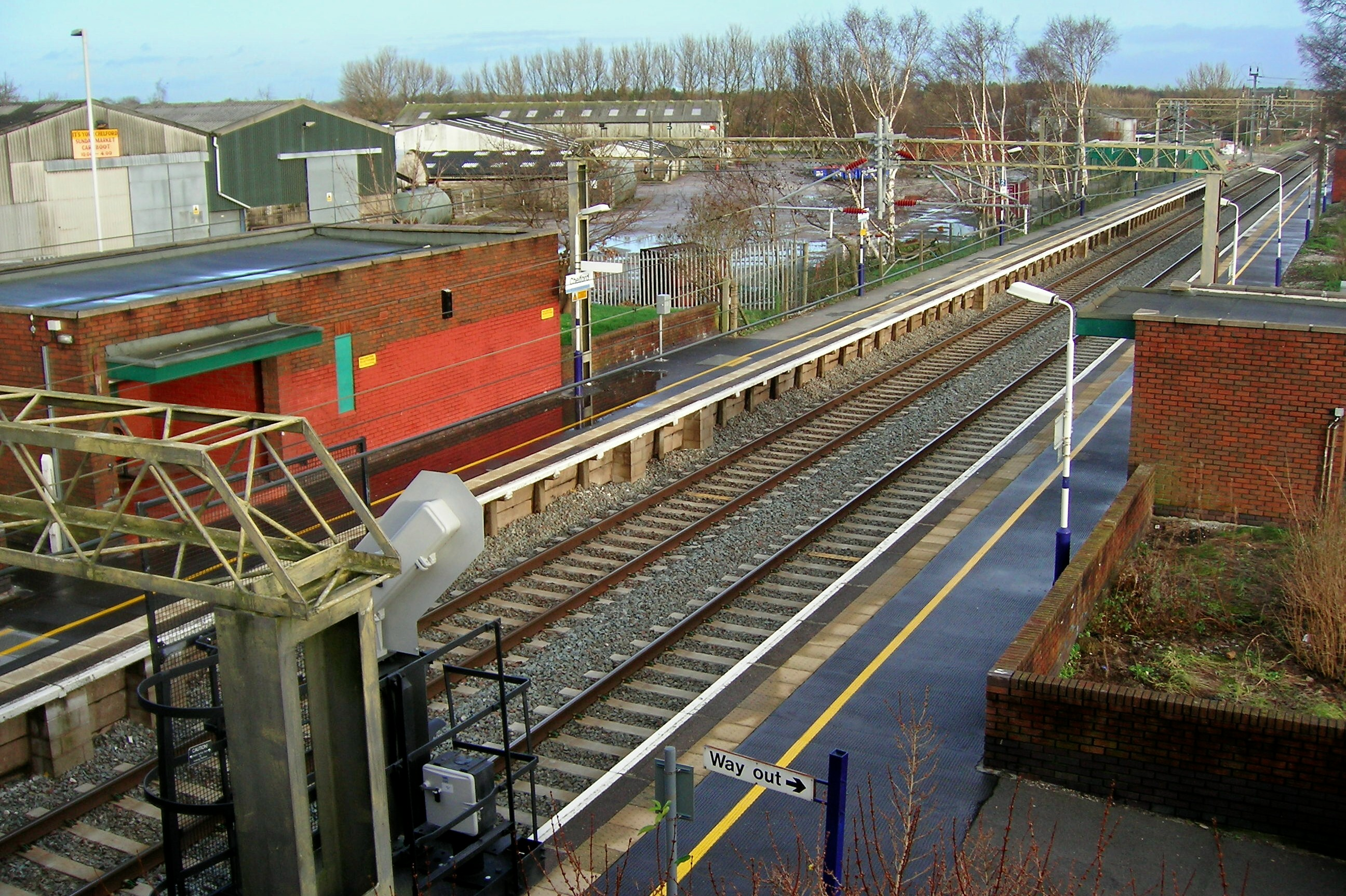
- Chelford railway station in 2006

General information
- Location: Chelford, Cheshire East; England
- Grid reference: SJ814749
- Manager: Northern Trains
- Platforms: 2

Other information
- Station code: CEL
- Classification: DfT category F2

History
- Opened: 10 May 1842
- Original company: Manchester and Birmingham Railway

Key dates
- C1880: Engine shed demolished
- 4 May 1970: Good yard closed

Passengers
- 2021/22: ▲36,838
- 2022/23: ▲39,986
- 2023/24: ▲41,124
- 2024/25: ▲46,262
- 2025/26: ▲50,582
Location
Notes
- Passenger statistics from the Office of Rail and Road

Chelford railway station serves the village of Chelford in Cheshire, England. It is a stop on the Crewe to Manchester Line, sited 14 1/4 miles (22.9 km) north of Crewe.

== History ==
Chelford railway station was opened by the Manchester and Birmingham Railway on 10 May 1842. It had its own engine shed, however this was demolished around 1880.

Following the formation of British Railways in 1948, services were operated by the London Midland region.

The station was rebuilt in 1960 by the architect to the London Midland section of British Rail, William Robert Headley. On 4 May 1970, the goods yard was closed.

=== Rail crash in 1894 ===
On 22 December 1894, a strong wind blew a high-sided freight wagon into violent contact with other wagons, causing one to overturn and block the main line. An express train, travelling between London Euston and Manchester London Road, collided with the wagon; 14 people were killed and 48 were injured.

== Services ==
Northern Trains provides an hourly service in each direction between Manchester Piccadilly, Stockport and Crewe.

Preceding station	National Rail	Following station
Goostrey	Northern Trains Crewe-Manchester line	Alderley Edge
