= William Robert Headley =

British 20th century architect

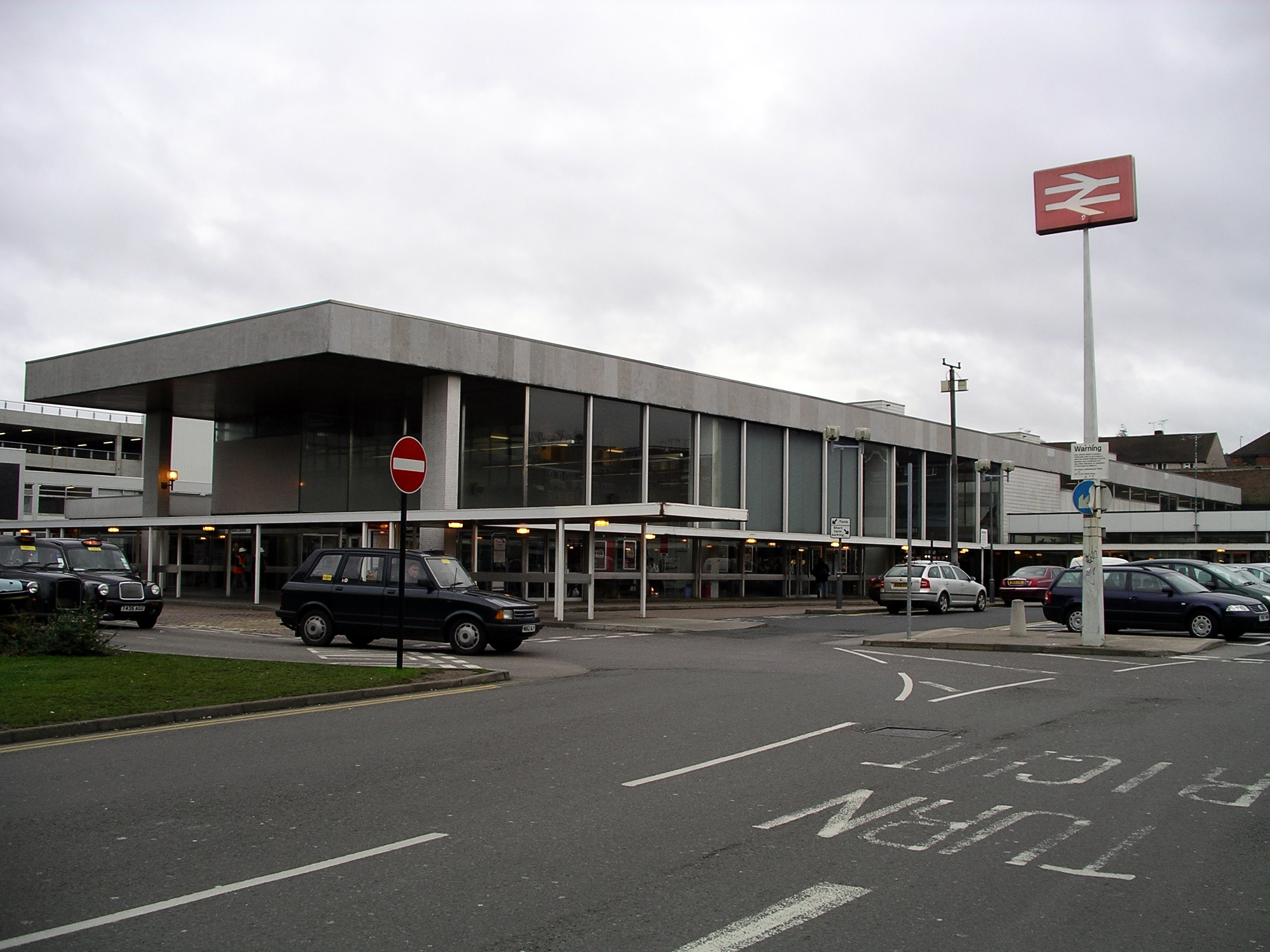
Coventry railway station 1959-62

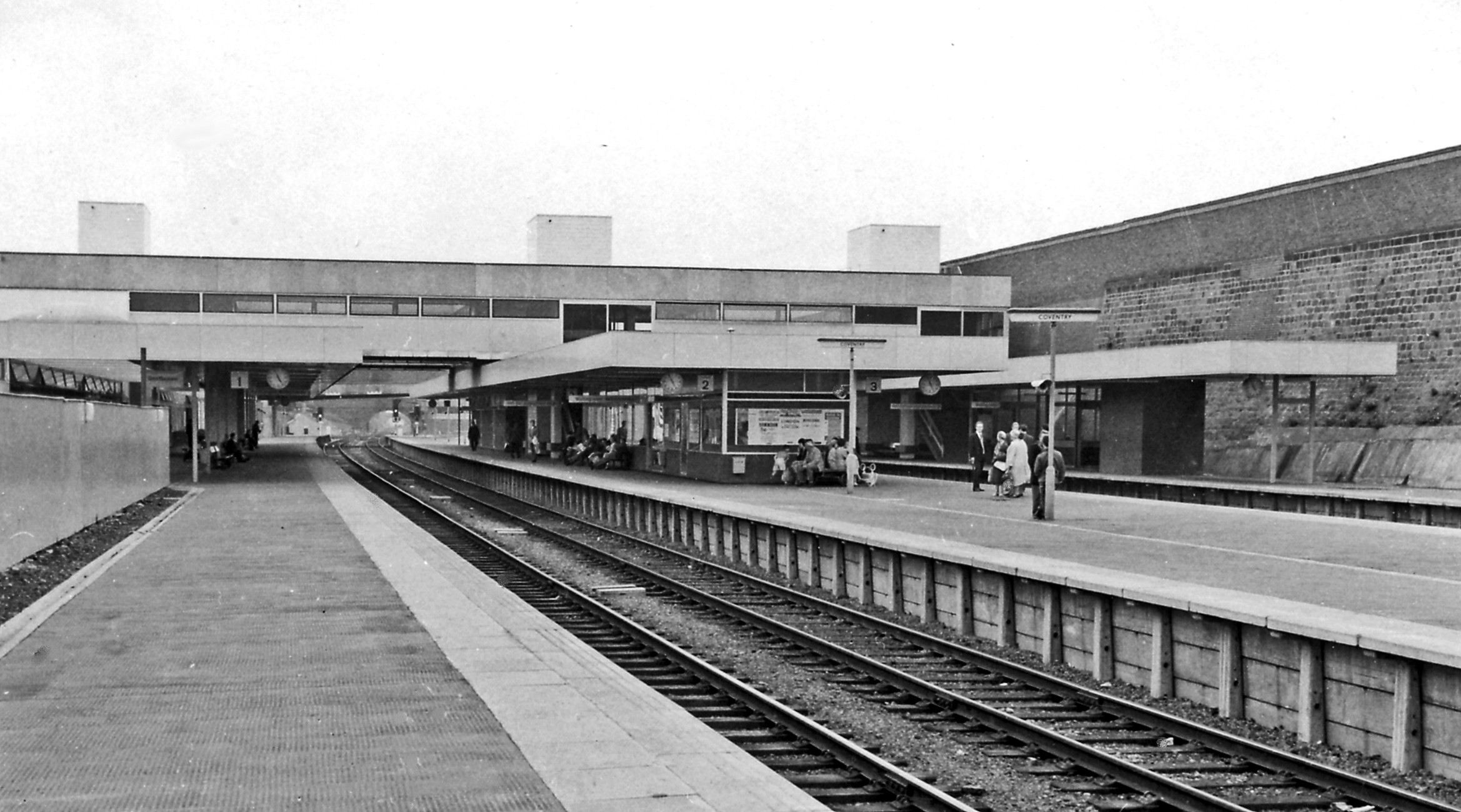
Coventry railway station platform buildings and shelters in 1962

William Robert Headley was an architect who is best known for his modernist railway stations for the London Midland Region of British Railways in the early 1960s.

Headley joined the railway service in 1947, achieved his diploma of the Architectural Association in 1948 and became architect for the London Midland region of British railways. He resigned his position with British Railways and was taken into partnership with Messrs Gollins, Melvin, Ward and Partners on 1 January 1963. He gave up his partnership in 1989.

== Works ==
- Manchester Piccadilly railway station 1958-60 (rebuilding)
- Wilmslow signal box 1959
- East Didsbury railway station 1959
- Coventry railway station 1959-62 with project architect Derrick Shorten
- Manchester Oxford Road railway station 1960. (with Max Clendinning)
- Crewe railway station 1960
- Manchester new power signal box 1960
- St Helens Central railway station 1960-61 (replaced in 2007)
- Stafford railway station 1961-62
- Chelford railway station 1960
- Euston railway station 1962-68 (with Ray Moorcroft)
- New Street station signal box 1964-65 (with Bicknell & Hamilton)
