= Bernard Kaukas =

Bernard Aloysius Kaukas MBE FRIBA (30 July 1922 – 2 May 2014) was Chief Architect for British Railways (BR) from 1968 to 1977 and BR's Director of Environment from 1977 to 1982.

== Biography ==
Kaukas was born in Hackney (London), on 30 July 1922 to Joseph Kaukas (1885–1964) and Ethel Margaret Morgan-Adlam (1894–1979). He was schooled at St Ignatius College, Stamford Hill.

"It is important that uses should be found for redundant listed buildings [in Britain], but the growth of modern legislation relating to safety and welfare has created its own Frankensteins in the gaunt spectres of uninhabitable and unlettable listed buildings, particularly in our urban areas."

Bernard Kaukas, quoted by Anne Keleny in The Independent, 2014

During the Second World War he spent a brief period as a firefighter in the London Blitz before joining the Royal Navy and serving on HMS Douglas.

After the war, he studied architecture at the Northern Polytechnic Institute in London, and worked briefly for two county council departments before going into private practice. In 1959 he moved to the British Transport Commission. In 1968 he succeeded Frederick Francis Charles Curtis as chief architect to the British Railways Board and in 1977 their Director of Environment until he retired in 1982. He was succeeded as Chief Architect to British Railways by Ray Moorcroft.

During his time at British Rail he persuaded the company to invest £3m to save the roof of St Pancras railway station which was in danger of collapse.

He was appointed MBE in 1984.

== Works ==
- Church of the Holy Apostles, Pimlico 1957.
