= Frederick Francis Charles Curtis =

- Born: 9 August 1903
- Died: 16 June 1975 (aged 71)
- Occupation: Architect

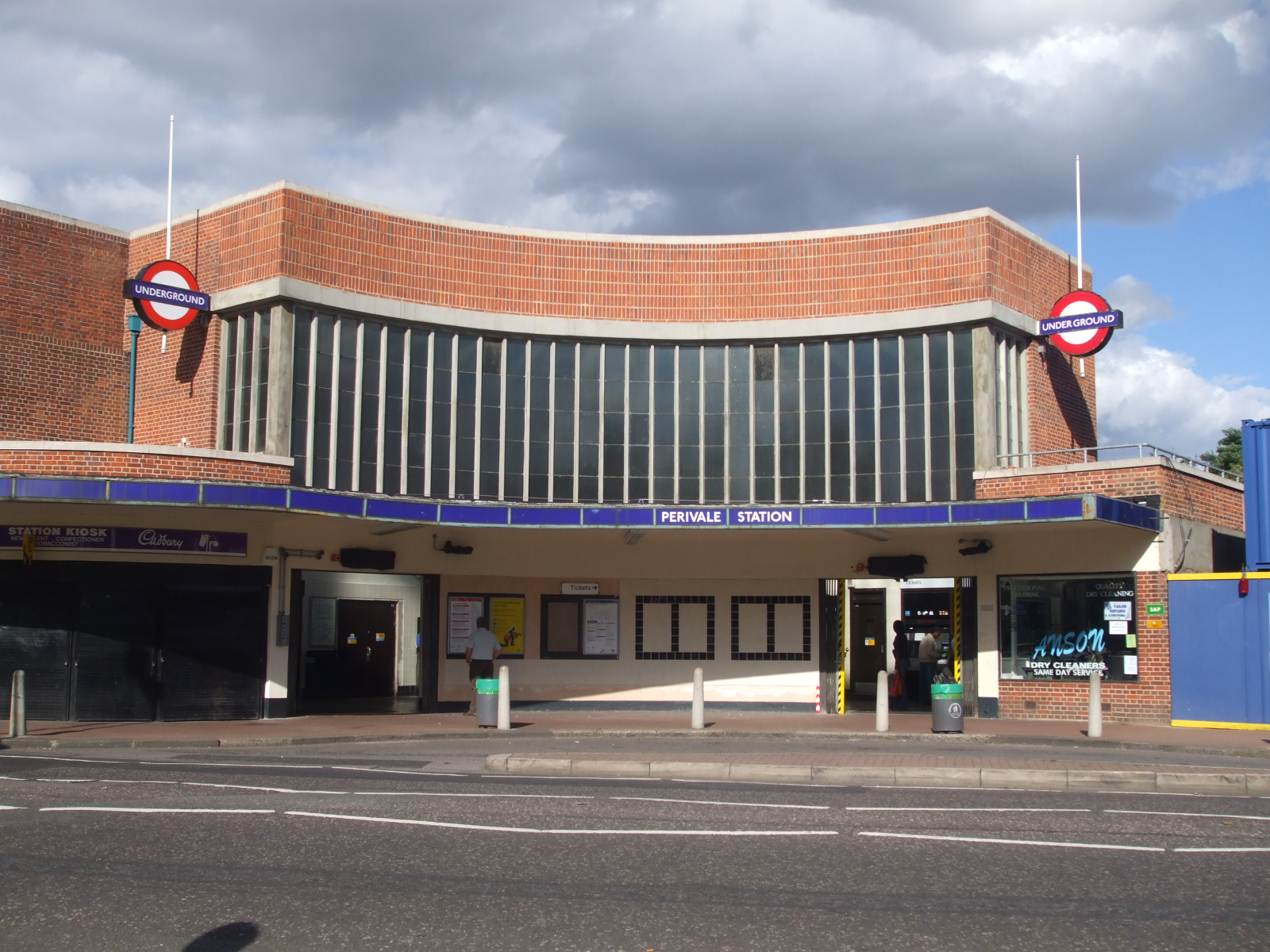
Perivale tube station of 1947

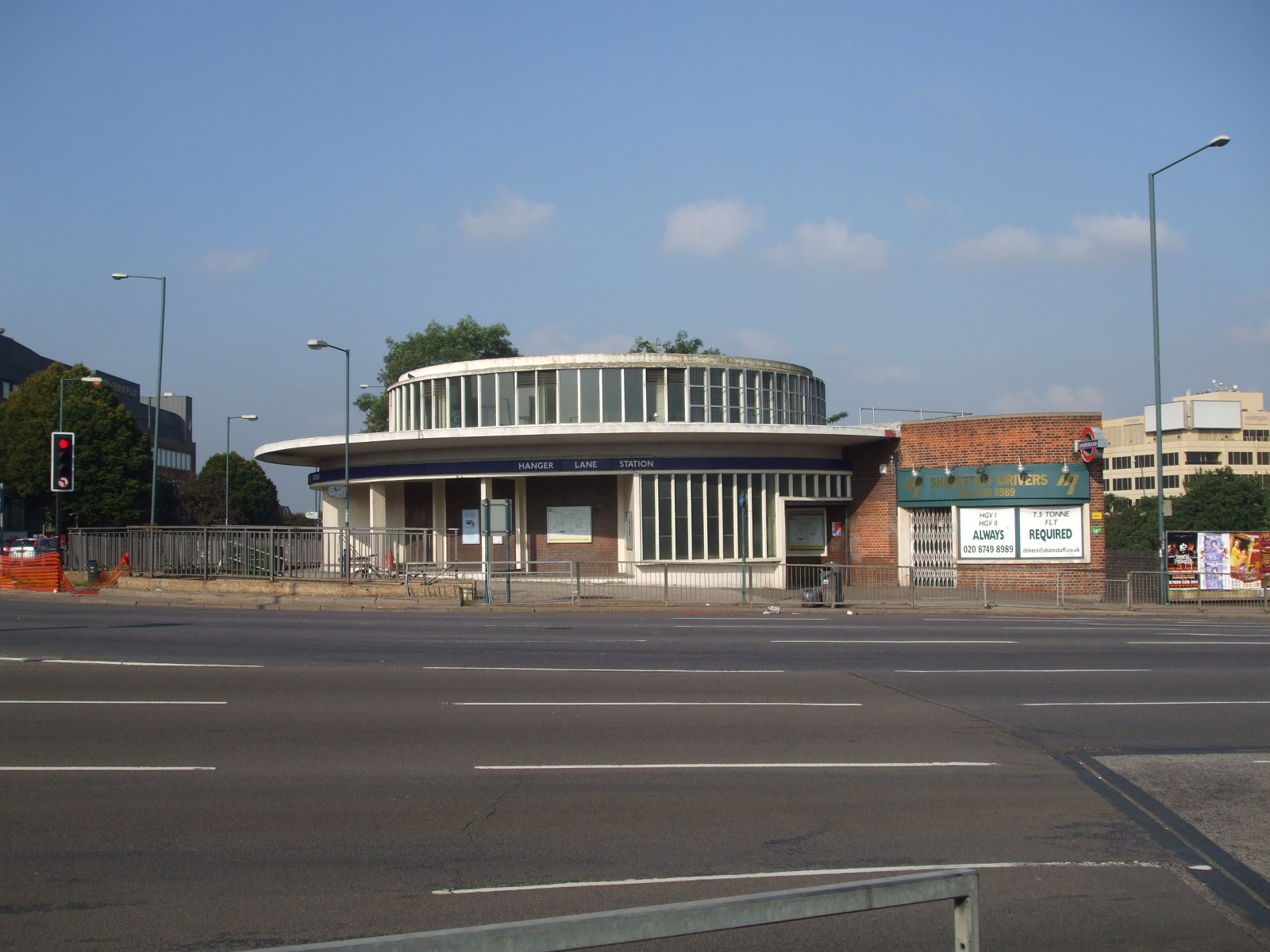
Hanger Lane tube station of 1947

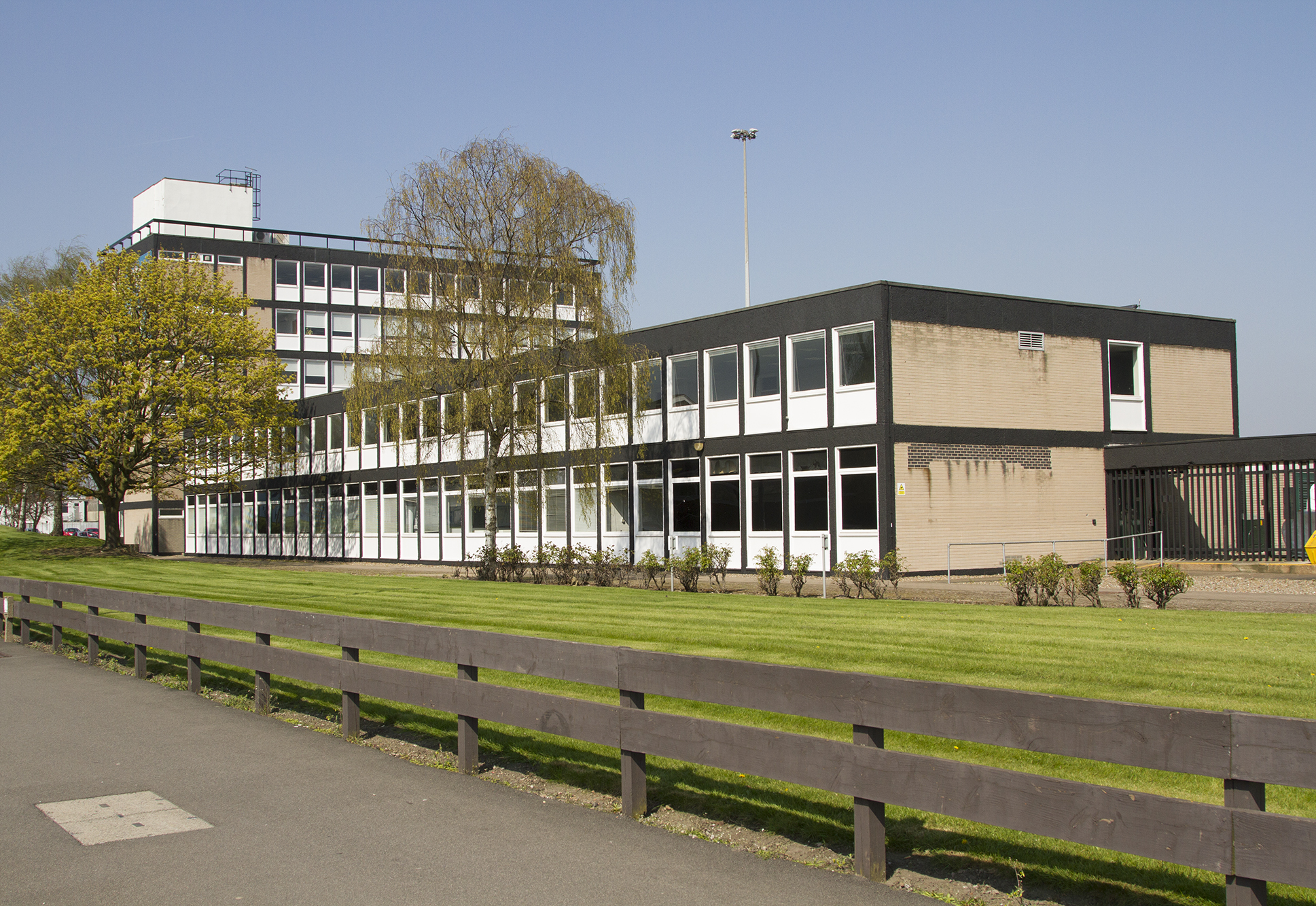
Railway Technical Centre, Derby 1965-68

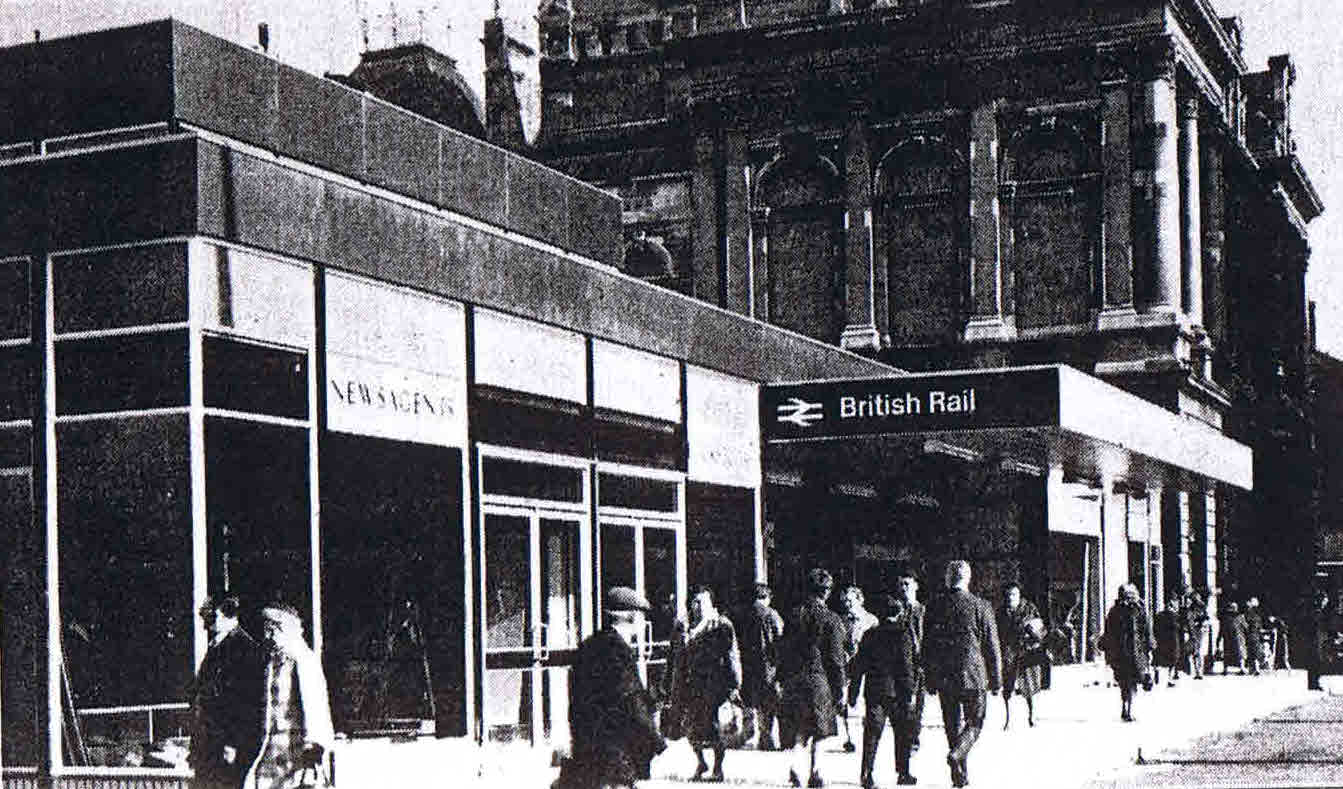
Sunderland station 1965

Frederick Francis Charles Curtis FRIBA (9 August 1903 – 16 June 1975) was the first chief architect for British Railways from 1948.

== Career ==
Curtis was born on 9 August 1903, at Frankfurt-on-Main. His father, Francis Curtis, was a lecturer in English at the Technische Universität Darmstadt, and from 1922 to 1927, Frederick Francis Curtis studied there. He then worked as an assistant and lecturer at the same institution until 1933. With the ascent of the National Socialist Party in 1933, he left Germany and moved to Britain where he worked with Charles Holden on the Southern Railway until 1936.

He was a lecturer in the Liverpool School of Architecture from 1936 – 1946 and during the Second World War served in the Railway Engineers at General Headquarters, India Command.

He is mentioned in The Black Book by the National Socialists and had the invasion of Britain been successful, he would have been arrested.

He was appointed an architect to the Great Western Railway company in 1947 in succession to Brian Lewis and became the first Chief Architect of British Railways in 1948.

He retired in 1968 and was succeeded as Chief Architect to British Railways by Bernard Kaukas.

== Works ==
- Peverel, Shellwood Road, Leigh, Surrey, 1936.
- British Transport Police Dog Training School, Elstree
- Perivale tube station 1947 (based on original designs by Brian Lewis)
- Hanger Lane tube station 1947 (based on original designs by Brian Lewis)
- South Ruislip station 1948
- Mechanical Engineering Museum of the British Railways Technical Centre, Derby.
- British Rail Technical Centre, London Road, Derby 1965–68.
- Sunderland station 1965
