= Euston railway station =

Central London railway terminus

Euston
- London Euston
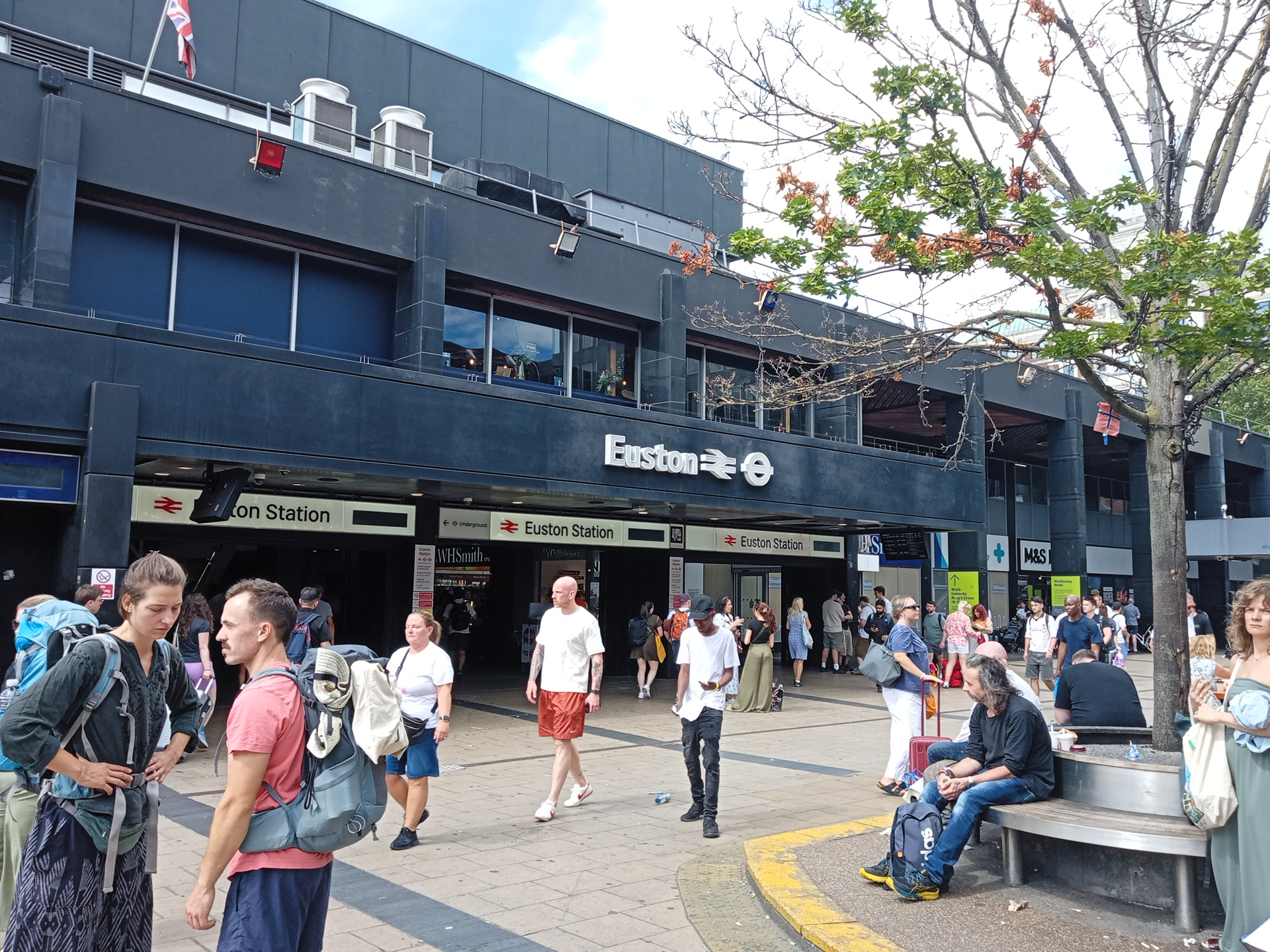
- Euston station frontage
- Interactive map of Euston

General information
- Location: Euston Road
- Local authority: London Borough of Camden
- Managed by: Network Rail
- Station code: EUS
- DfT category: A
- Number of platforms: 16
- Accessible: Yes
- Fare zone: 1
- OSI: Euston; Euston Square; St Pancras; King's Cross
- Cycle parking: Yes – platforms 17–18 and external
- Toilet facilities: Yes

National Rail annual entry and exit
- 2021–22: ▲23.098 million
- Interchange: ▲3.121 million
- 2022–23: ▲31.318 million
- Interchange: ▼2.124 million
- 2023–24: ▲36.185 million
- Interchange: ▲2.680 million
- 2024–25: ▲40.249 million
- Interchange: ▼2.433 million
- 2025–26: ▲42.170 million
- Interchange: ▲2.629 million

Railway companies
- Original company: London & Birmingham Railway
- Pre-grouping: London & North Western Railway
- Post-grouping: London Midland & Scottish Railway

Key dates
- 20 July 1837: Opened
- 1849: Expanded
- 1962–1968: Rebuilt

Other information
- External links: Departures; Facilities
- Coordinates: 51.5284°N 0.1331°W

Euston railway station (/ˈjuːstən/ YOO-stən; or London Euston) is a major central London railway terminus and connected London Underground station managed by Network Rail in the London Borough of Camden. It is the southern terminus of the West Coast Main Line, the UK's busiest inter-city railway. Euston is the tenth-busiest station in Britain and the country's busiest inter-city passenger terminal, being the gateway from London to the West Midlands, North West England, North Wales and Scotland.

Intercity express passenger services to the major cities of Birmingham, Manchester, Liverpool, Glasgow and Edinburgh, and through services to Holyhead for connecting ferries to Dublin are operated by Avanti West Coast. Overnight sleeper services to Scotland are provided by the Caledonian Sleeper. London Northwestern Railway provide commuter and regional services to the West Midlands, whilst the Lioness line of the London Overground provides local suburban services in the London area via the Watford DC Line which runs parallel to the West Coast Main Line as far as Watford Junction. Euston tube station is connected to the main concourse and Euston Square tube station is nearby. King's Cross and St Pancras railway stations are about 1/2 mile (800 metres) east along Euston Road.

Euston, the first inter-city railway terminal in London, was planned by George and Robert Stephenson. It was designed by Philip Hardwick and built by William Cubitt, with a distinctive arch over the station entrance. The station opened as the terminus of the London and Birmingham Railway (L&BR) on 20 July 1837. Euston was expanded after the L&BR was amalgamated with other companies to form the London and North Western Railway, and the original sheds were replaced by the Great Hall in 1849. Capacity was increased throughout the 19th century from two platforms to fifteen. The station was controversially rebuilt in the mid-1960s when the Arch and the Great Hall were demolished to accommodate the electrified West Coast Main Line, and the revamped station still attracts criticism over its architecture. Euston is to be the London terminus for the planned High Speed 2 railway and the station is being redeveloped to accommodate it.

== Name and location ==
Unusually for a London terminus, the station is not based on its location, but after Euston Hall in Suffolk, the ancestral home of the Dukes of Grafton, the main landowners in the area during the mid-19th century. It is set back from Euston Square and Euston Road on the London Inner Ring Road, between Cardington Street and Eversholt Street in the London Borough of Camden. It is one of 20 stations managed by Network Rail. As of 2023–2024, it is the tenth-busiest station in Britain. Euston bus station is in front of the main entrance.

== History ==
Euston was the first inter-city railway station in London. It opened on 20 July 1837 as the terminus of the London and Birmingham Railway (L&BR). It was demolished in the 1960s and replaced with the present building in the international modern style.

The site was chosen in 1831 by George and Robert Stephenson, engineers of the L&BR. The area was mostly farmland at the edge of the expanding city, and adjacent to the New Road (now Euston Road), which had caused urban development. The name Euston came from Euston Hall, the seat of the duke of Grafton, who owned the locality.

The station and railway have been owned by the L&BR (1837–1846), the London and North Western Railway (LNWR) (1846–1923), the London, Midland and Scottish Railway (LMS) (1923–1948), British Railways (1948–1994), Railtrack (1994–2002) and Network Rail (2002–present).

=== Old station ===
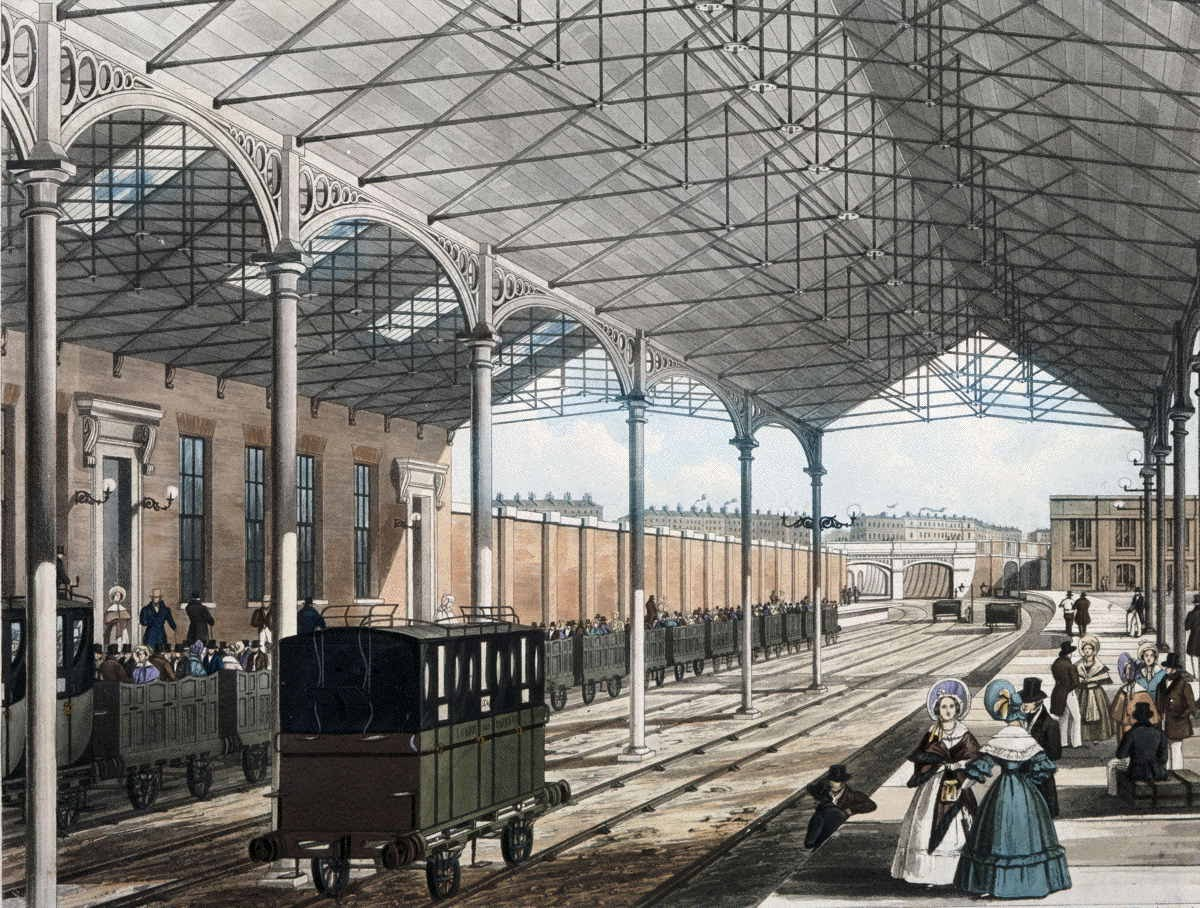
An early print of Euston showing the wrought iron roof of 1837

The plan was to construct a station near the Regent's Canal in Islington to provide a connection for London dock traffic. An alternative site at Marble Arch, proposed by Robert Stephenson, was rejected by a provisional committee, and a proposal to end the line at Maiden Lane was rejected by the House of Lords in 1832. A terminus at Camden Town, announced by Stephenson the following year, received royal assent on 6 May, before an extension was approved in 1834, allowing the line to reach Euston Grove where the original station was built by William Cubitt.

Initial services were three trains to and from Boxmoor with journeys taking just over an hour. On 9 April 1838, they were extended to a temporary halt at Denbigh Hall near Bletchley where a coach service was provided to Rugby. The line to Curzon Street station in Birmingham opened on 17 September 1838, the journey of 112 miles (180 km) took around 5 1/4 hours.

The incline from Camden Town to Euston involved crossing the Regent's Canal on a gradient of more than 1 in 68 (1.47%). Because steam trains at the time could not climb such an ascent, they were cable-hauled on the down line towards Camden until 1844, after which bank engines were used. The L&BR's act of Parliament prohibited the use of locomotives in the Euston area, following concerns of residents about noise and smoke from locomotives toiling up the incline.

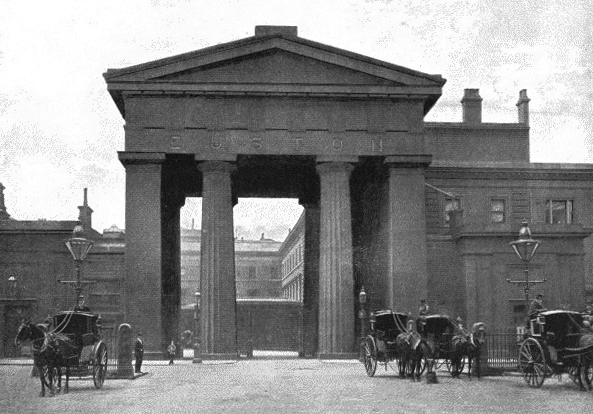
The Euston Arch, the original entrance to Euston Station (1896)

The station was built with space left vacant for extra platforms, as it was originally planned for the Great Western Railway (GWR) to use Euston, as the terminus of the Great Western Main Line. In the event, the GWR chose to build their own terminus at Paddington. The spare land was instead used for more platforms for ever expanding services as the railway network grew.

The station building, designed by the classically trained architect Philip Hardwick, had a 200-foot-long (61 m) trainshed by structural engineer Charles Fox. It had two 420-foot-long (130 m) platforms, one each for departures and arrival. The main entrance portico, the Euston Arch, also by Hardwick, symbolised the arrival of a major new transport system and was "the gateway to the north". It was 72 feet (22 m) high, supported on four 44 ft 2 in (13.46 m) by 8 ft 6 in (2.59 m) hollow Doric propylaeum columns of Bramley Fall stone, the largest ever built. It was completed in May 1838 and cost £35,000 (now £3,355,000). The old station building was probably the first one in the world with all-wrought iron roof trusses.

The first railway hotels in London were built at Euston. Two hotels designed by Hardwick opened in 1839 on either side of the Arch; the Victoria on the west had basic facilities while the Euston on the east was designed for first-class passengers.

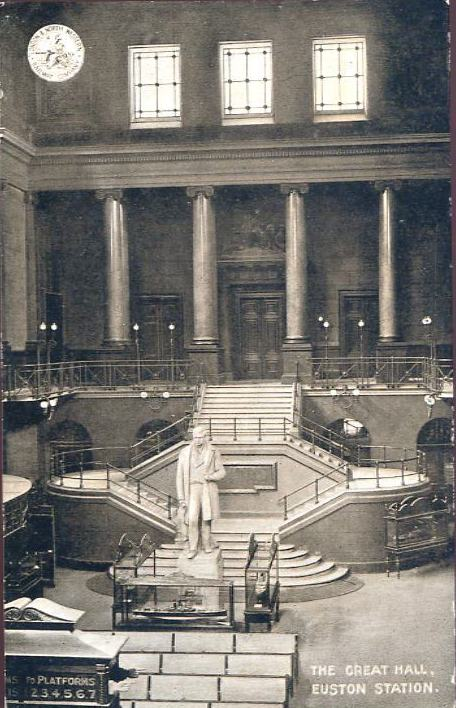
The Great Hall, Euston Station

Between 1838 and 1841, parcel handling grew from 2,700 parcels a month to 52,000. By 1845, 140 staff were employed but trains began to run late because of a lack of capacity. The following year, two platforms (later 9 and 10) were constructed on vacant land to the west of the station that had been reserved for Great Western Railway services. The L&BR amalgamated with the Manchester & Birmingham Railway and the Grand Junction Railway in 1846 to form the LNWR. The company headquarters were established at Euston requiring a block of offices to be built between the Arch and the platforms.

The station's facilities were expanded with the opening of the Great Hall on 27 May 1849 replacing the original sheds. The Great Hall was designed by Hardwick's son Philip Charles Hardwick in classical style. It was 125 ft (38 m) long, 61 ft (18.6 m) wide, and 62 ft (18.9 m) high with a coffered ceiling and a sweeping double flight of stairs leading to offices at its northern end. Architectural sculptor John Thomas contributed eight allegorical statues representing the cities served by the line. The station faced Drummond Street, further back from Euston Road than the front of the modern complex; Drummond Street now terminates at the side of the station but then ran across its front. A short road, Euston Grove, ran from Euston Square towards the arch.

A bay platform (later platform 7) for local services to Kensington (Addison Road) opened in 1863. Two new platforms (1 and 2) were added in 1873 along with an entrance for cabs from Seymour Street. At the same time, the station roof was raised by 6 feet (1.8 m) to accommodate smoke from the engines.

The continued growth of long-distance railway traffic led to major expansion along the station's west side starting in 1887. It involved rerouting Cardington Street over part of the burial ground (later St James's Gardens) of St James's Church, Piccadilly, which was located some way from the church. To avoid public outcry, the remains were reinterred at St Pancras Cemetery. Two more platforms (4 and 5) opened in 1891. Four departure platforms (now platforms 12–15), bringing the total to 15, and a booking office on Drummond Street opened on 1 July 1892.

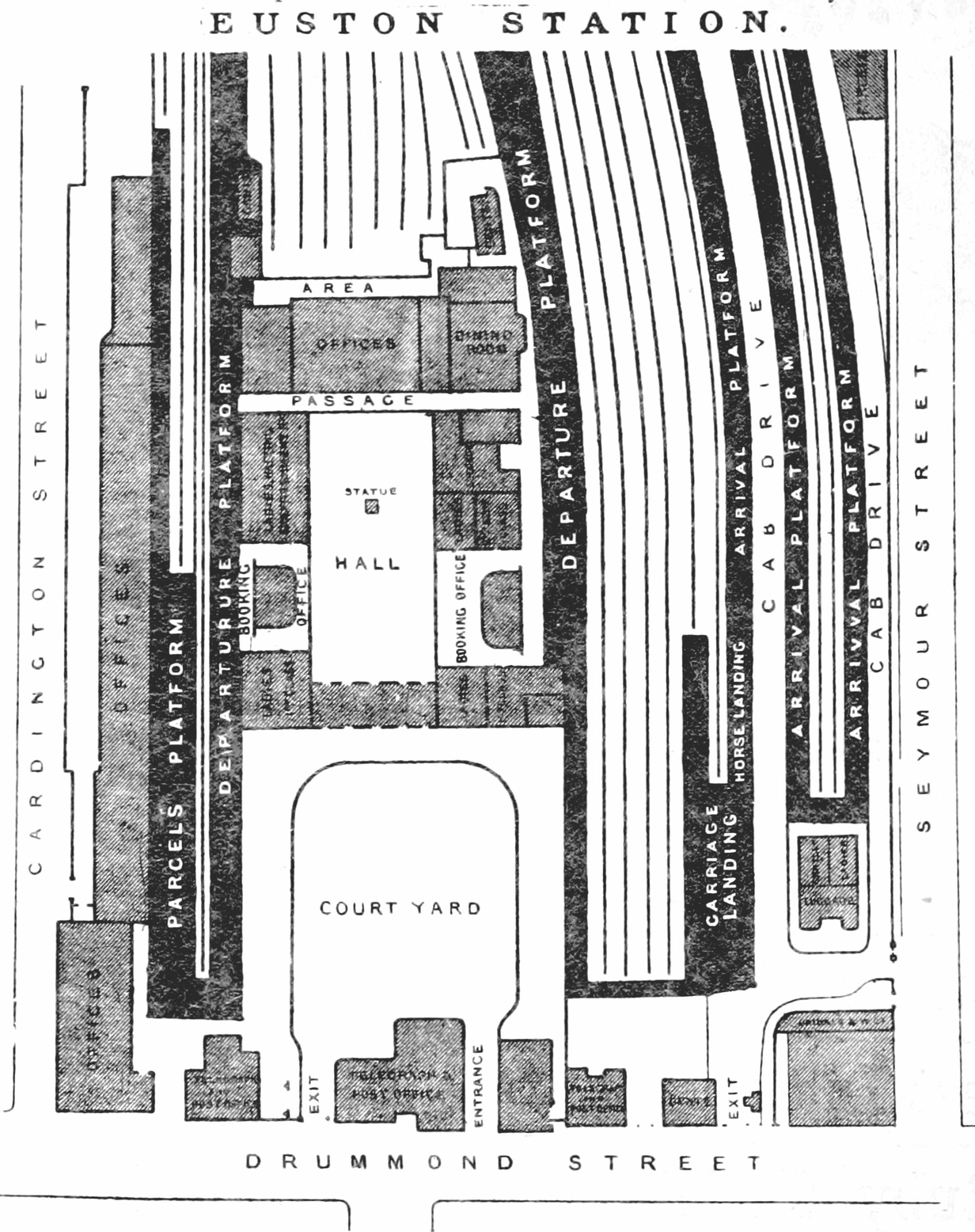
Plan of Euston station from 1888

The line between Euston and Camden was doubled between 1901 and 1906. A new booking hall opened in 1914 on part of the cab yard. The Great Hall was redecorated and refurbished between 1915 and 1916 and again in 1927. The station's ownership was transferred to the London, Midland and Scottish Railway (LMS) in the 1923 grouping.

Apart from the lodges on Euston Road and statues now on the forecourt, few relics of the old station survive. The National Railway Museum's collection at York includes Edward Hodges Baily's statue of George Stephenson from the Great Hall; the entrance gates; and a turntable from 1846 discovered during demolition.

=== London, Midland and Scottish Railway redevelopment ===
By the 1930s Euston was again congested and the LMS considered rebuilding it. In 1931 it was reported that a site for a new station was being sought, the most likely option was behind the existing station in the direction of Camden Town. The LMS announced in 1935 that the station (including the hotel and offices) would be rebuilt using a government loan guarantee.

In 1937 it appointed the architect Percy Thomas to produce designs. He proposed an American-inspired station that would involve removing or resiting the arch, and included office frontages along Euston Road and a helicopter pad on the roof. Redevelopment began on 12 July 1938, when 100,000 long tons (101,605 tonnes) of limestone was extracted for the building and new flats were constructed to rehouse people displaced by the works. The project was shelved indefinitely because of World War II.

The station was damaged several times during the Blitz in 1940. Part of the Great Hall's roof was destroyed, and a bomb landed between platforms 2 and 3, destroying offices and part of the hotel.

=== New station ===
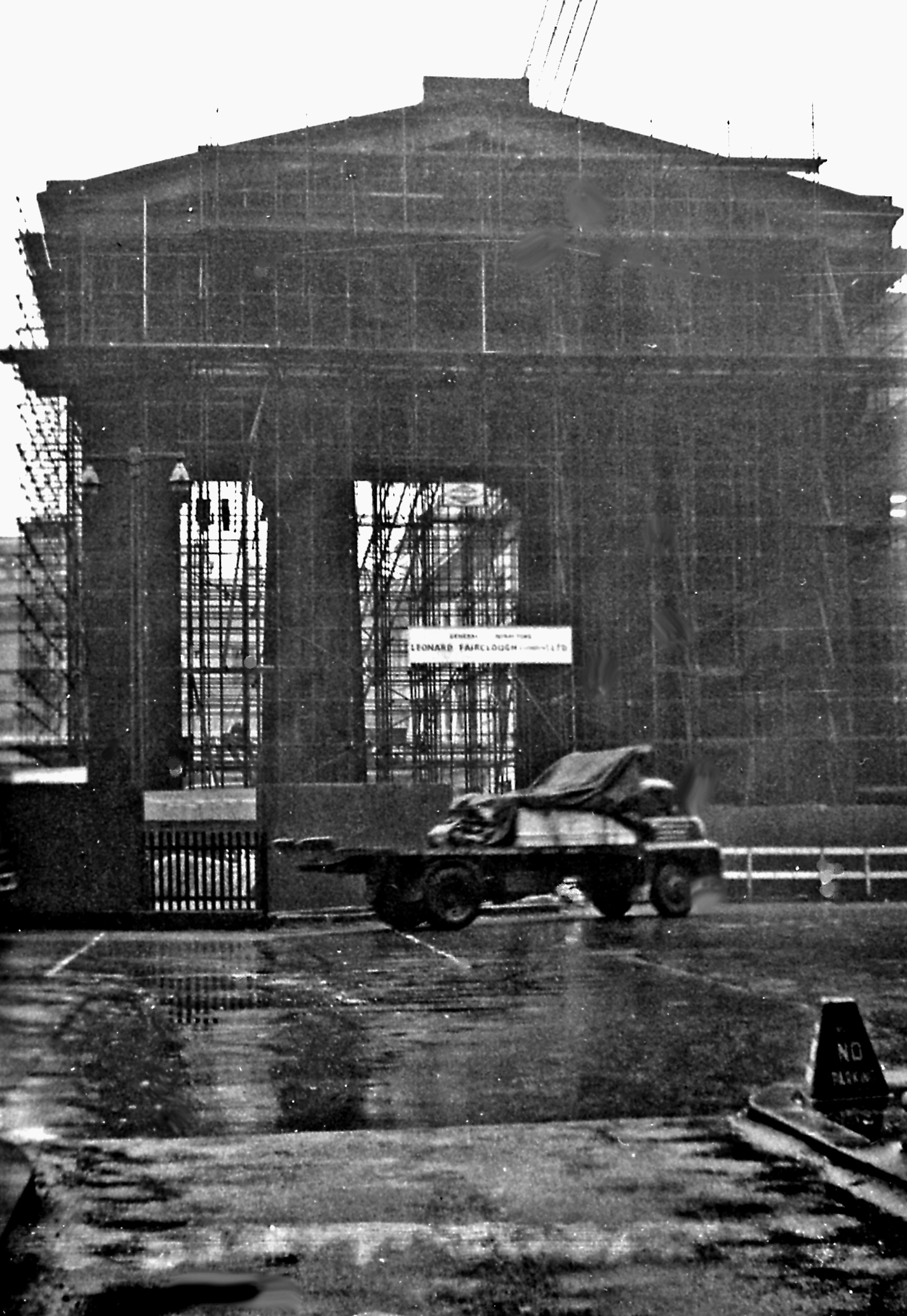
The Euston Arch being demolished in 1962

Passengers considered Euston to be squalid and covered in soot and it was restored and redecorated in 1953, when an enquiry kiosk in the middle of the Great Hall was removed. Ticket machines were modernised. By this time the Arch was surrounded by property development and kiosks and in need of restoration.

British Railways announced that Euston would be rebuilt to accommodate the electrification of the West Coast Main Line in 1959. Because of the restricted layout of track and tunnels at the northern end, enlargement only could be accomplished by expanding southwards over the area occupied by the Great Hall and the Arch. Permission to demolish the Arch and Great Hall was sought from London County Council and it was granted on condition that the Arch would be restored and re-sited. BR estimated it would cost at least £190,000 (now £4,610,000) and was not viable.

The Arch's demolition, announced by the Minister of Transport, Ernest Marples in July 1961, drew objections from the Earl of Euston, the Earl of Rosse and John Betjeman. Experts did not believe the work would cost £190,000 and speculated it could be done more cheaply by foreign labour. On 16 October 1961, 75 architects and students staged a demonstration against its demolition inside the Great Hall and a week later Sir Charles Wheeler led a deputation to speak with the Prime Minister Harold Macmillan. Macmillan replied that as well as the cost, there was nowhere large enough to relocate the Arch in keeping with its surroundings.

Demolition began on 6 November and was completed within four months. The station was rebuilt by Taylor Woodrow Construction to a design by London Midland Region architects of British Railways, William Robert Headley and Ray Moorcroft, in consultation with Richard Seifert & Partners. Redevelopment began in summer 1962 and progressed from east to west, the Great Hall was demolished and an 11,000-square-foot (1,000 m^{2}) temporary building housed ticket offices and essential facilities. Euston worked to 80% capacity during the works with at least 11 platforms in operation at any time. Services were diverted elsewhere where practical and the station remained operational throughout the works.

The first phase of construction involved building 18 platforms with two track bays to handle parcels above them, a signal and communications building and various staff offices. The parcel deck was reinforced using 5,500 tons of structural steelwork. Signalling on the routes leading out of the station was reworked along with the electrification of the lines, including the British Rail Automatic Warning System. Fifteen platforms had been completed by 1966, and the electric service began on 3 January. An automated parcel depot above platforms 3 to 18 opened on 7 August 1966. The station was opened by Queen Elizabeth II on 14 October 1968.

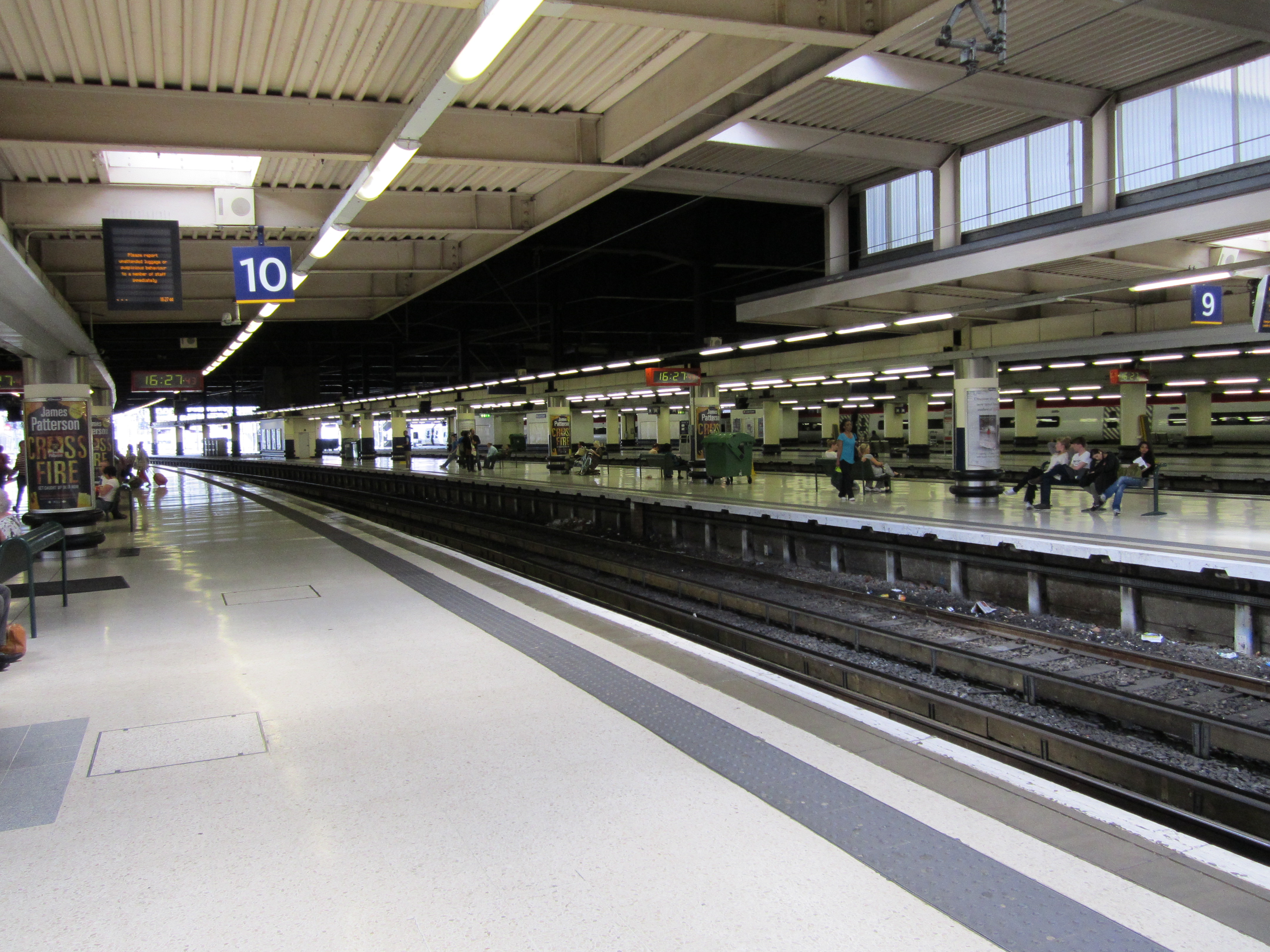
Platforms

The station is a long, low structure, 200 feet (61 m) wide and 150 feet (46 m) deep under a 36-foot (11 m) high roof. It opened with integrated automatic ticket facilities and a range of shops; the first of its kind for any British station. The plan to construct offices above the station whose rents would help fund the cost of the rebuilding was scrapped after a government White Paper was released in 1963 that restricted the rate of commercial office development in London.

In 1966, a "Whites only" recruitment policy for guards at the station was dropped after the case of Asquith Xavier, a migrant from Dominica, who had been refused promotion on those grounds, was raised in Parliament and taken up by the Secretary of State for Transport, Barbara Castle.

A second development phase by Richard Seifert & Partners began in 1979, adding 405,000 square feet (37,600 m^{2}) of office space along the station frontage in the form of three low-rise towers overlooking Melton Street and Eversholt Street. The offices were occupied by British Rail, then by Railtrack, and by Network Rail which has now vacated (Note: Many staff transferred to a new complex in Milton Keynes, see Quadrant:mk) all but a small portion of one of the towers. The offices are in a functional style; the main facing material is polished dark stone, complemented by white tiles, exposed concrete and plain glazing.

The station has a large concourse separate from the train shed. Originally, no seats were installed there to deter vagrants and crime, but were added after complaints from passengers. Few remnants of the older station remain: two Portland stone entrance lodges, the London and North Western Railway War Memorial and a statue of Robert Stephenson by Carlo Marochetti, from the old ticket hall, stands in the forecourt.

A large statue by Eduardo Paolozzi named Piscator dedicated to German theatre director Erwin Piscator is sited at the front of the courtyard, which as of 2016 was reported to be deteriorating. Other pieces of public art, including low stone benches by Paul de Monchaux around the courtyard, were commissioned by Network Rail in 1990. The station has catering units and shops, a large ticket hall and an enclosed car park with over 200 spaces. The lack of daylight on the platforms compares unfavourably with the glazed trainshed roofs of traditional Victorian railway stations, but the use of the space above as a parcels depot released the maximum space at ground level for platforms and passenger facilities.

Since 1996, proposals have been formulated to reconstruct the Arch as part of the redevelopment of the station, and its use as the terminus of the High Speed 2 line.

=== Privatisation ===
Ownership of the station transferred from British Rail to Railtrack in 1994, passing to Network Rail in 2002 following the collapse of Railtrack. In 2005 Network Rail was reported to have long-term aspirations to redevelop the station, removing the 1960s buildings and providing more commercial space by using the "air rights" above the platforms.

In 2007, British Land announced that it had won the tender to demolish and rebuild the station, spending some £250 million of its overall redevelopment budget of £1 billion for the area. The number of platforms would increase from 18 to 21. In 2008, it was reported that the Arch could be rebuilt. In September 2011, the demolition plans were cancelled, and Aedas was appointed to give the station a makeover.

In July 2014 a statue of navigator and cartographer Matthew Flinders, who circumnavigated the globe and charted Australia, was unveiled at Euston; his grave was rumoured to lie under platform 15 at the station, but had been relocated during the original station construction and in 2019 was found behind the station during excavation work for the HS2 line.

=== High Speed 2 ===
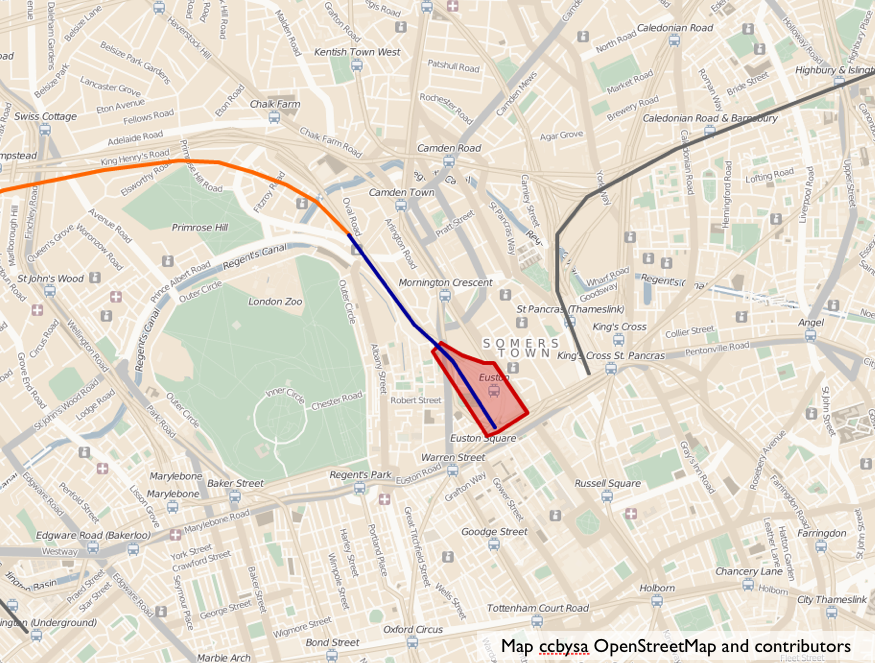
Map of the area around Euston, with planned High Speed 2 redevelopment. The new line is drawn in orange (left). (The line to the right is High Speed 1 entering St Pancras International).

In March 2010 the Secretary of State for Transport, Andrew Adonis announced that Euston was the preferred southern terminus of the planned High Speed 2 line, which would connect to a newly built station near Curzon Street and Fazeley Street in Birmingham. This would require expansion to the south and west to create new sufficiently long platforms. These plans involved a complete reconstruction, involving the demolition of 220 Camden Council flats, with half the station providing conventional train services and the new half high-speed trains. The Command Paper suggested rebuilding the Arch, and included an artist's impression.

The station is to have seven new platforms dropped from an original planned eight, taking the total to 23, with 10 dedicated to HS2 services and 13 to conventional lines at a low level. The flats demolished for the extension would be replaced by significant building work above. The Underground station would be rebuilt and connected to adjacent Euston Square station. As part of the extension beyond Birmingham, the Mayor of London's office believed it will be necessary to build the proposed Crossrail 2 line via Euston to relieve 10,000 extra passengers forecast to arrive during an average day.

To relieve pressure on Euston during and after rebuilding for High Speed 2, HS2 Ltd has proposed the diversion of some services to Old Oak Common (for Crossrail). This would include eight commuter trains per hour originating/terminating between Tring and Milton Keynes Central inclusive. In 2016, the Mayor Sadiq Khan endorsed the plans and suggested that all services should terminate at Old Oak Common while a more appropriate solution is found for Euston.

The current scheme does not provide any direct access between High Speed 2 at Euston and the existing High Speed 1 at St Pancras. In 2015, plans were announced to link the two stations via a travelator service. Platforms 17 and 18 closed in May and June 2019 for High Speed 2 preparation work.

The Euston Downside Carriage Maintenance Depot was demolished in 2018 in preparation for the start of tunnelling. The two office towers in front of the station were demolished between January 2019 and December 2020. The third tower at 1 Eversholt Street is not part of these plans. Two hotels on Cardington Street adjacent to the west of the station were also demolished. The development will remove 3.6 acres (14,404 m^{2}) of green space and playgrounds in the area, with additional temporary closures during the development. The cemetery in adjacent St James's Gardens was controversially excavated in 2018–19, resulting in an estimated 60,000 graves having to be exhumed, and the entire site being cleared of all human remains – the largest exhumation in British history, and the corpses having to be reburied in Brookwood Cemetery in Brookwood, Surrey.

In August 2019, the Department for Transport (DfT) ordered an independent review of the project, chaired by the British civil engineer Douglas Oakervee. The Oakervee Review was published by the Department for Transport the following February, alongside a statement from the Prime Minister Boris Johnson confirming that HS2 would go ahead in full, with reservations. The review said the rebuild was "not satisfactory" and called the management "muddled" and recommended a change of governance. In Summer 2020, the government asked Network Rail's chairman, Sir Peter Hendy, to lead an oversight board; in October 2020, the Architects' Journal reported that more than £100m had already been spent on engineering and architectural design fees.

In October 2023, the Prime Minister Rishi Sunak announced that construction of the Euston terminus and approach tunnel would not be government funded and that it could only go ahead with private sector investment. Transport for London commissioner Andy Lord was sceptical that the private sector would pay for the link to Old Oak Common. Government funding for the approach tunnel was subsequently restored in the October 2024 United Kingdom budget; the source of funding for the station itself remained unconfirmed.

== Criticism ==
=== Demolition of original station ===
The demolition of the original buildings in 1962 was described by the Royal Institute of British Architects as "one of the greatest acts of Post-War architectural vandalism in Britain" and was approved directly by Harold Macmillan. The attempts made to preserve the earlier building, championed by Sir John Betjeman, led to the formation of the Victorian Society and heralded the modern conservation movement. This movement saved the nearby high Gothic St Pancras station when threatened with demolition in 1966, ultimately leading to its renovation in 2007 as the terminus of HS1 to the Continent.

=== Architecture ===
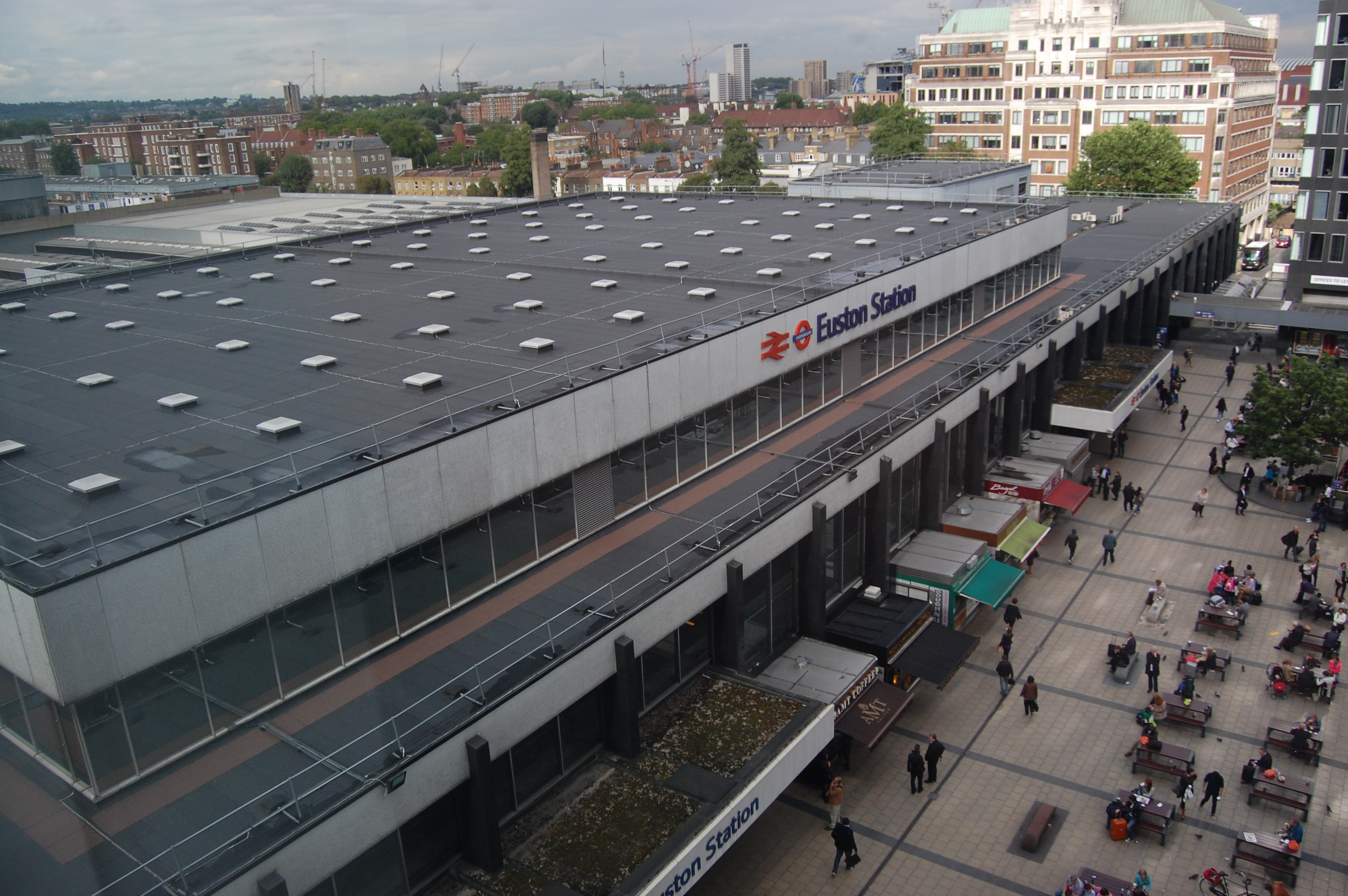
Euston station seen from above, in 2013

Euston's 1960s style of architecture has been described as "a dingy, grey, horizontal nothingness" and a reflection of "the tawdry glamour of its time", entirely lacking in "the sense of occasion, of adventure, that the great Victorian termini gave to the traveller". Writing in The Times, Richard Morrison stated that "even by the bleak standards of Sixties architecture, Euston is one of the nastiest concrete boxes in London: devoid of any decorative merit; seemingly concocted to induce maximum angst among passengers; and a blight on surrounding streets. The design should never have left the drawing-board – if, indeed, it was ever on a drawing-board. It gives the impression of having been scribbled on the back of a soiled paper bag by a thuggish android with a grudge against humanity and a vampiric loathing of sunlight".

=== Passenger experience ===
Michael Palin, explorer and travel writer, in his contribution to Great Railway Journeys titled "Confessions of a Trainspotter" in 1980, likened it to "a great bath, full of smooth, slippery surfaces where people can be sloshed about efficiently". Journalist Barney Ronay described the station as "easily, easily the worst main station in Western Europe" and that using it is "like being taken away to be machine gunned in the woods by various mobile phone and soft drinks companies". In contrast, the Spectator's Richard Bratby praised the station, saying it is "human in scale. It's classically proportioned, respectful of the cityscape around it and lovingly detailed".

Access to parts of the station is difficult for people with physical disability. The introduction of lifts in 2010 made the taxi rank and underground station accessible from the concourse, though some customers found them unreliable and frequently broken down. Wayfindr technology was introduced to the station in 2015 to help people with visual impairment to navigate the station.

In September 2023, the Office of Rail and Road issued Network Rail with an improvement notice in relation to its failure to put in place effective measures to tackle overcrowding. Network Rail admitted that the station was designed for a different era and that "the passenger experience at Euston remains uncomfortable at times". The Office of Rail and Road declared in December 2023 that Network Rail had complied with the notice and implemented measures to better manage passenger traffic flows and overcrowding. In October 2024, London TravelWatch warned that passengers at Euston are being put in danger when the station becomes severely overcrowded during periods of disruption to services. Transport Secretary Louise Haigh subsequently asked Network Rail to declutter the station concourse and improve how it handles train announcements. Network Rail reacted by switching off the advertising board installed in January 2024 after removal of the main departure boards, and issued a five point improvement plan.

== Incidents ==
On 26 April 1924, an electric multiple unit collided with the rear of an excursion train carrying passengers from Coventry to the FA Cup Final. Five passengers were killed. The crash was blamed on poor visibility owing to smoke and steam under the Park Street Bridge.

On 27 August 1928, a passenger train collided with the buffer stops. Thirty people were injured.

On 10 November 1938, a suburban service collided with empty coaches after a signal was misinterpreted. 23 people were injured.

On 6 August 1949, an empty train was accidentally routed towards a service for Manchester, colliding with it at about 5 mph (8 km/h). The crash was blamed on a lack of track circuiting and no proper indication of when platforms were occupied.

=== 1973 IRA attack ===
Extensive but superficial damage was caused by an IRA bomb that exploded close to a snack bar at approximately 1:10 pm on 10 September 1973, injuring eight people. A similar explosive had detonated 50 minutes earlier at King's Cross. The Metropolitan Police had received a three-minute warning, and were unable to evacuate the station completely, but British Transport Police managed to clear much of the area just before the explosion. In 1974, the mentally ill Judith Ward confessed to the bombing and was convicted of this and other crimes, despite the evidence against her being highly suspect and Ward retracting her confessions. She was acquitted in 1992; the true culprit has yet to be identified.

== Cultural references ==
The station has been the backdrop for a musical film clip as well as the subject in songs since the 1960s. Barbara Ruskin both wrote and recorded the song "Euston Station" which was released in 1967. In 1969, rock group Ambrose Slade shot a promo film at the station for their Beginnings album. Craig Davies recorded the song "Euston Railway Station Blues" which was released in the late 1980s. Jane Kitto's 2002 song "Busdriver" is about getting on the no. 73 bus from Euston station to Stoke Newington. In another travel theme it was referenced by The Smiths in their song "London" as a way to get to the city from Manchester.

== National Rail services and London Overground ==
Euston has services from five different train operators:

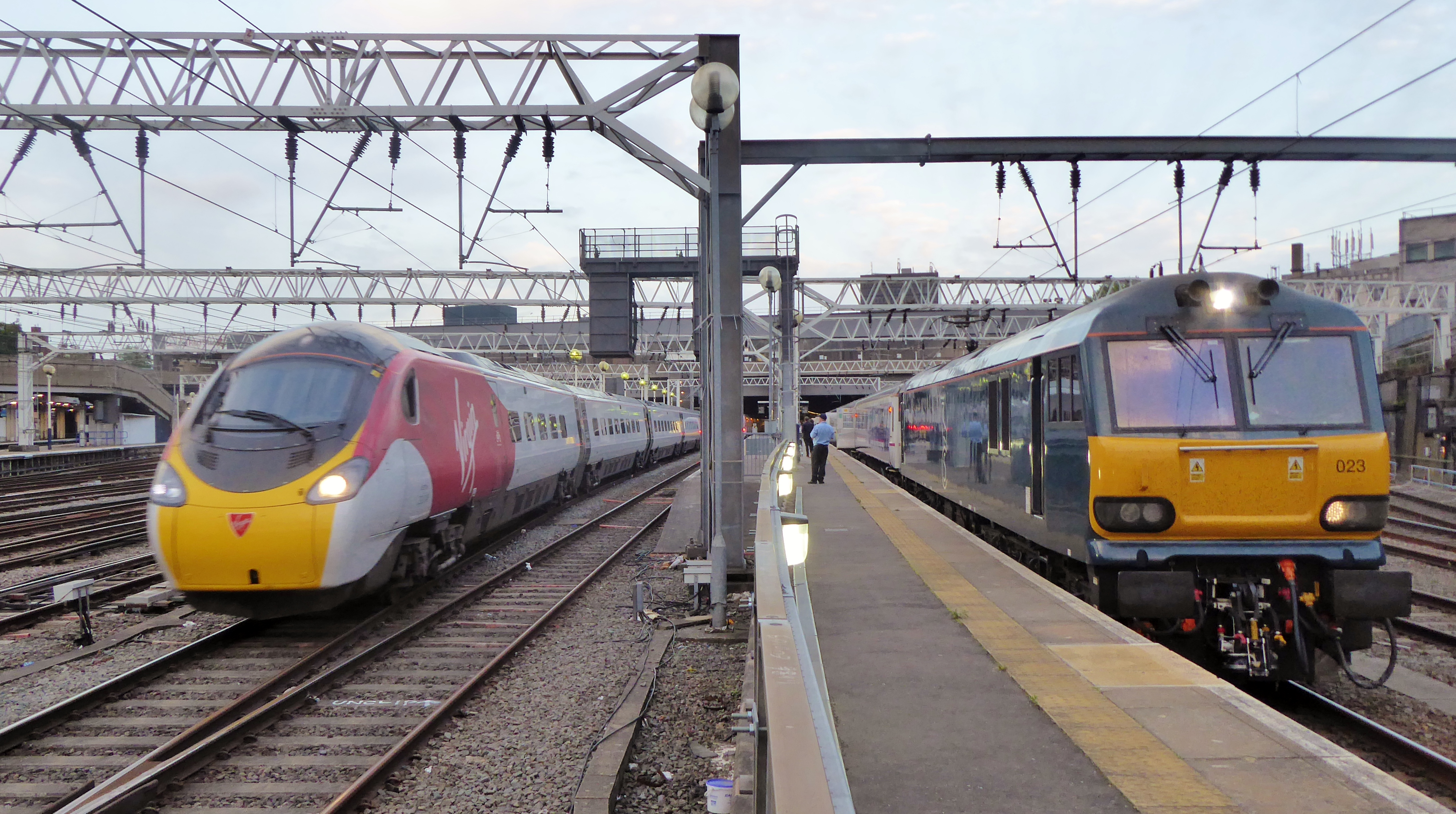
Virgin Trains Class 390 (left) and Caledonian Sleeper Class 92 (right)

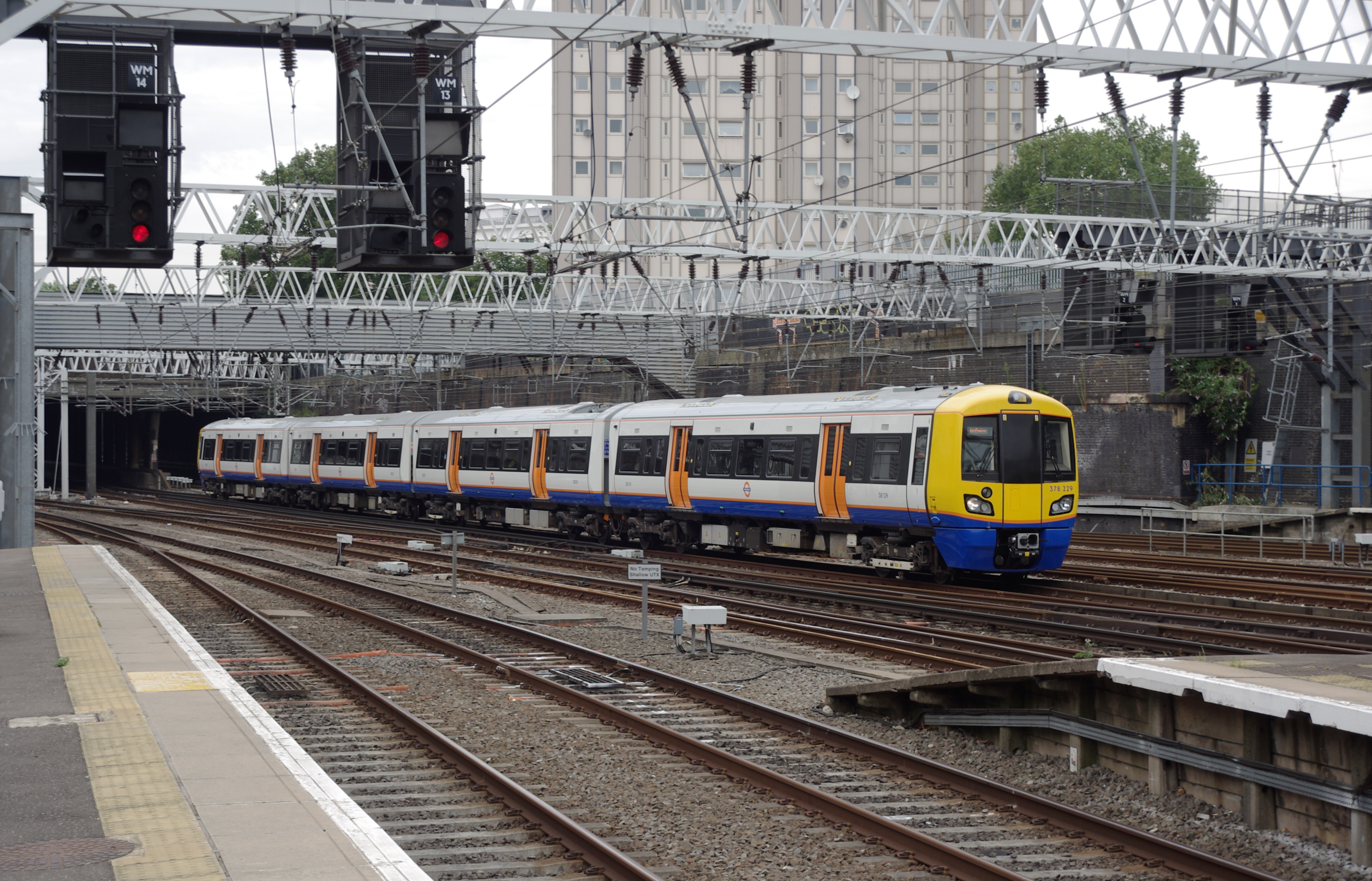
London Overground Class 378 entering Euston on the Lioness line from Watford Junction

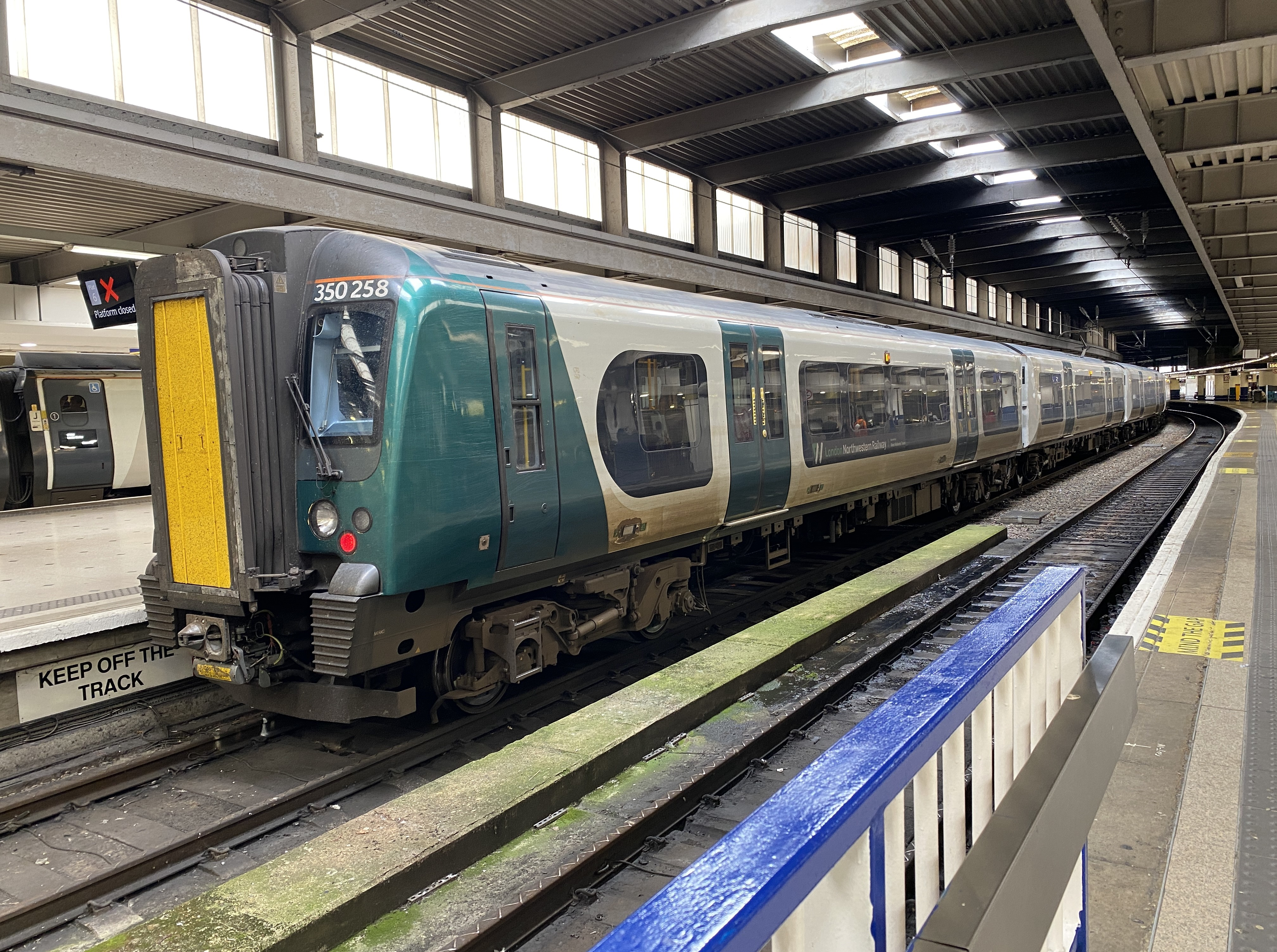
London Northwestern Railway Class 350 entering Euston from the West Coast Main Line

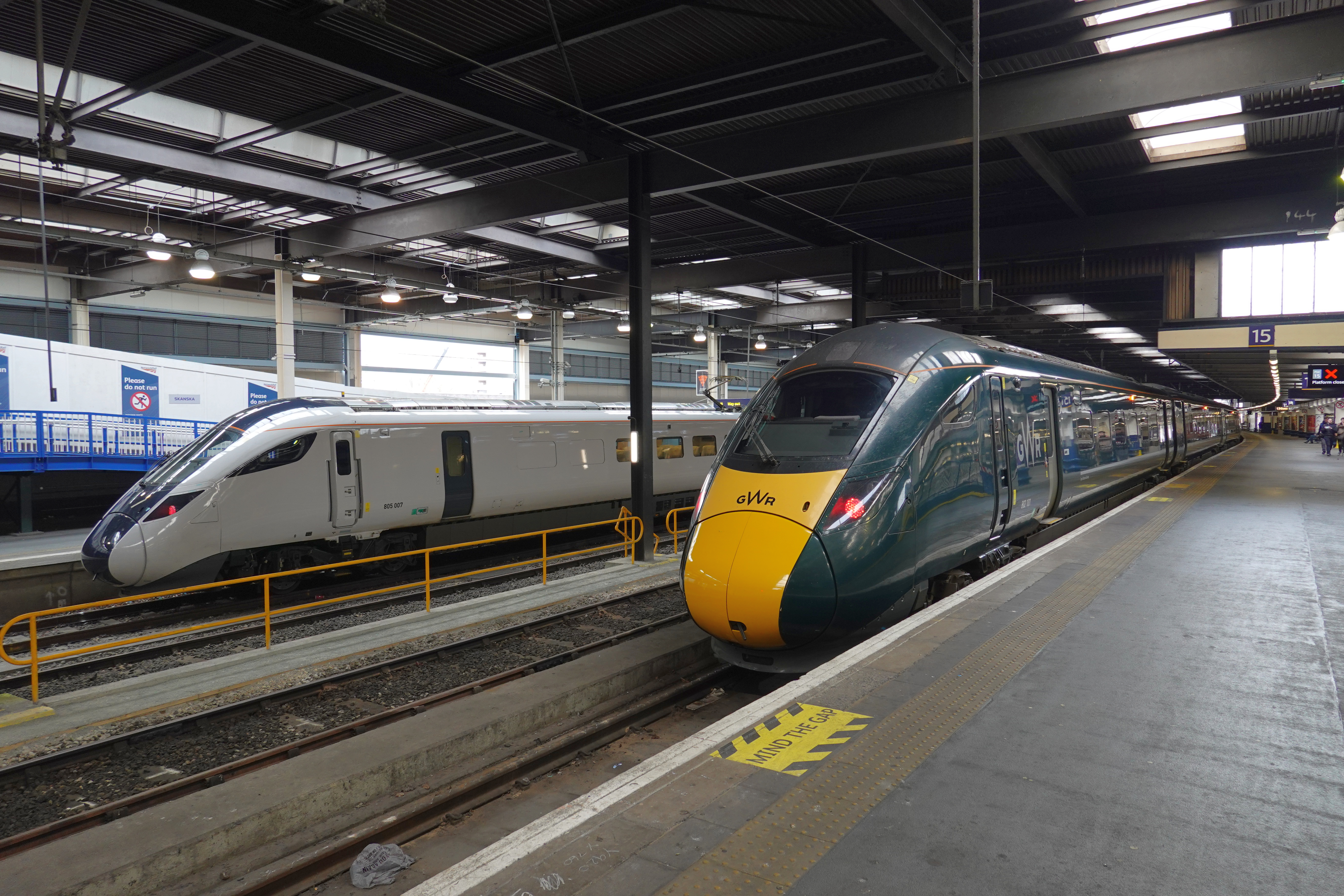
Great Western Railway Class 800 (right) and Avanti West Coast Class 805 (left)

Avanti West Coast operates InterCity West Coast services:

- 3 tph (trains per hour) to Birmingham New Street via Coventry, extended to/from Wolverhampton (at peak hours), of which:
  - 1 tph extends to Preston via Warrington Bank Quay and Wigan North Western
    - 6 trains per day (tpd) run Glasgow Central, with 1 train every 2 hours running to Edinburgh, via Carlisle.
- 1 tph to Chester via Crewe, with certain trains extended along the North Wales Main Line to Bangor or Holyhead for the ferries to Ireland, such as Irish Ferries as well as Stena Line to Dublin Port, one train on Mon-Fri to Wrexham General
- 3 tph to Manchester Piccadilly via Stockport, of which:
  - 2 tph operate via Stoke-on-Trent
  - 1 tph operate via Stafford, Crewe and Wilmslow
- 2 tph to Liverpool Lime Street via Runcorn, of which:
  - 1tph operates via Milton Keynes Central, Crewe and Liverpool South Parkway
  - 1 tph operates via Tamworth and Lichfield Trent Valley
- 1 tph to Glasgow Central via Preston. Additional services operate to/from Preston, Lancaster and Carlisle during peak times.

London Northwestern Railway operates regional and commuter services.

- 2 tph to Tring via Watford Junction
- 2 tph to Milton Keynes Central
- 2 tph to Birmingham New Street via Northampton
- 1 tph to Crewe via Nuneaton and Stafford

London Overground operates local commuter services.

- 4 tph to Watford Junction via the Lioness line (Watford DC line)

Lumo

- 4 trains per day Stirling
- 1 trains per day Preston

Caledonian Sleeper operates two nightly services to Scotland from Sunday to Friday inclusive.

- Highland sleeper to Aberdeen via Kirkcaldy and Dundee. Fort William via Dalmuir and Glasgow Queen Street. and Inverness via Stirling and Perth
- Lowland sleeper to Glasgow Central and Edinburgh Waverley via Carlisle

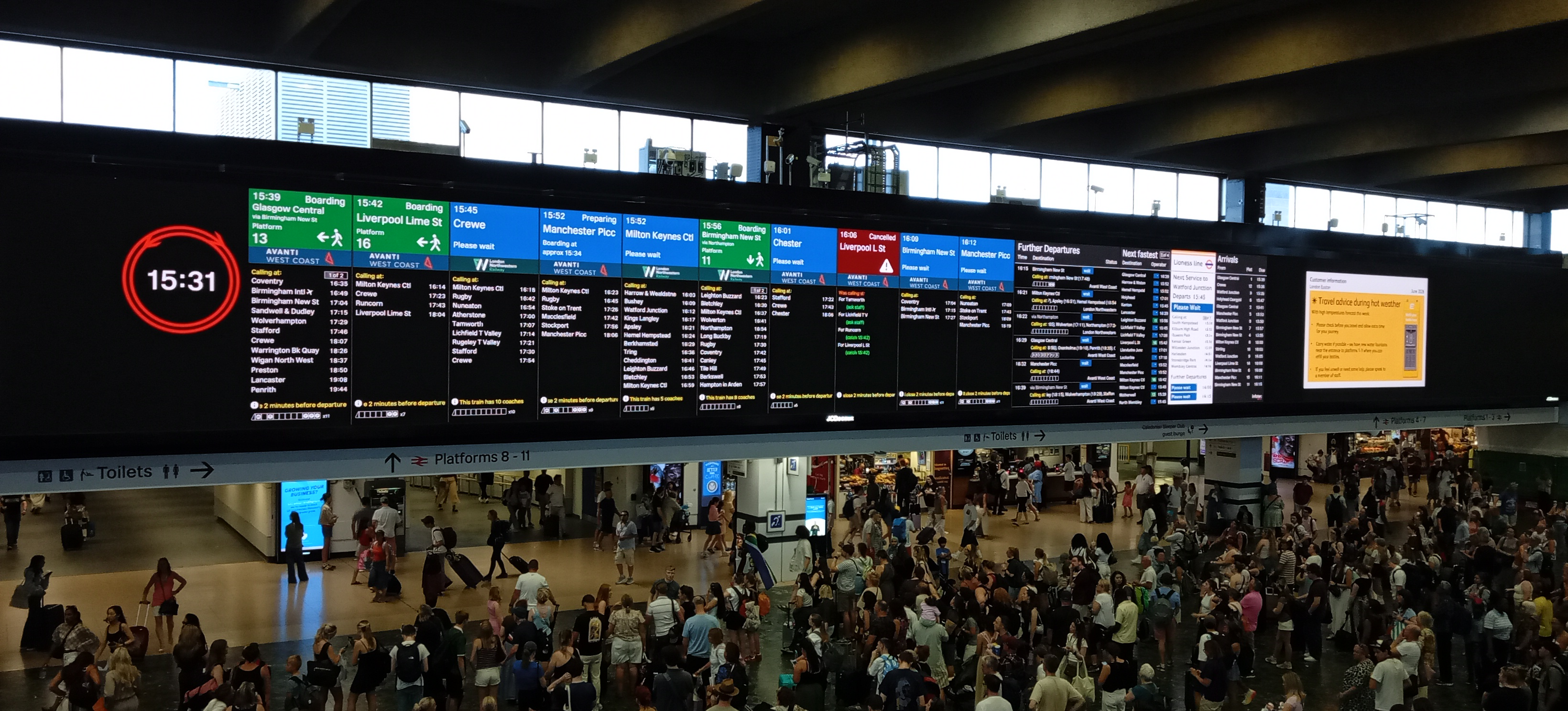
The departures and arrivals board at London Euston Station

Preceding station	London Overground	Following station
South Hampstead towards Watford Junction	Lioness line Watford DC line	Terminus
Preceding station	National Rail	Following station
Watford Junction	Caledonian Sleeper; Lowland Caledonian Sleeper	Terminus
Birmingham International	Caledonian Sleeper; Highland Caledonian Sleeper	Terminus
Watford Junction towards	London Northwestern Railway London – Birmingham	Terminus
Milton Keynes Central towards	London Northwestern Railway London – Crewe	Terminus
Harrow & Wealdstone towards	London Northwestern Railway London – Milton Keynes	Terminus
Milton Keynes Central	Lumo; London Euston to Stirling	Terminus
Watford Junction or Milton Keynes Central or Coventry or Rugby	Avanti West Coast; WCML London – West Midlands – North West & Scotland	Terminus
Milton Keynes Central, Nuneaton or Stafford	Avanti West Coast; WCML London – Chester & North Wales	Terminus
Watford Junction or Milton Keynes Central or Tamworth or Stafford or Crewe or Runcorn	Avanti West Coast; WCML London – Crewe – Liverpool	Terminus
Watford Junction or Milton Keynes Central or Nuneaton or Stafford or Stoke-on-Trent or Crewe	Avanti West Coast; WCML London – Manchester via Stoke-on-Trent or Crewe	Terminus
Watford Junction or Milton Keynes Central or Tamworth or Warrington Bank Quay or Preston	Avanti West Coast; WCML London – North West & Scotland	Terminus
Reading or Newbury or Swindon	Great Western Railway; Great Western Main Line	Terminus
Reading	Great Western Railway; Night Riviera	Terminus
Future services
Preceding station	National Rail	Following station
Old Oak Common	Avanti West Coast; High Speed 2	Terminus

== London Underground ==
Euston was poorly served by the early London Underground network. The nearest station on the Metropolitan line was Gower Street, around five minutes' walk away. A permanent connection did not appear until 12 May 1907, when the City & South London Railway opened an extension west from Angel. The Charing Cross, Euston & Hampstead Railway opened an adjacent station on 22 June in the same year; these two stations are now part of the Northern line. Gower Street station was quickly renamed Euston Square in response. A connection to the Victoria line opened on 1 December 1968.

The underground network around Euston is planned to change depending on the construction of High Speed 2. Transport for London (TfL) plans to change the safeguarded route for the proposed Chelsea–Hackney line to include Euston between Tottenham Court Road and King's Cross St Pancras. As part of the rebuilding work for High Speed 2, it is proposed to integrate Euston and Euston Square into a single tube station.

Preceding station	London Underground	Following station
Euston
Mornington Crescent towards Edgware, Mill Hill East or High Barnet	Northern line Charing Cross Branch transfer at Euston	Warren Street towards Battersea Power Station or Morden
Camden Town towards Edgware, Mill Hill East or High Barnet	Northern line Bank Branch transfer at Euston	King's Cross St Pancras towards Morden
Warren Street towards Brixton	Victoria line transfer at Euston	King's Cross St Pancras towards Walthamstow Central
Euston Square
Great Portland Street towards Hammersmith	Circle line transfer at Euston Square	King's Cross St Pancras towards Edgware Road via Aldgate
Great Portland Street towards Hammersmith	Hammersmith & City line transfer at Euston Square	King's Cross St Pancras towards Barking
Great Portland Street towards Uxbridge, Amersham, Chesham or Watford	Metropolitan line transfer at Euston Square	King's Cross St Pancras towards Aldgate

== See also ==
- Birmingham Curzon Street railway station (1838–1966) – the original Birmingham counterpart to the original Euston station
- Pennsylvania Station (1910–1963) – a similarly demolished and rebuilt station
