= Craig (given name) =

- Pronunciation: /kreɪɡ/; also US: /krɛɡ/
- Gender: Male
- Language: Celtic, English

Origin
- Languages: Scottish Gaelic, Irish Gaelic, Welsh, English
- Derivation: creag
- Meaning: "rock"

Other names
- Cognate: Craig (surname)

Craig is an English, Scottish, Irish and Welsh masculine given name; all variations derive from the Celtic languages and the English language. The name has two origins. In some cases it can originate from a nickname, derived from the Scottish Gaelic word creag, meaning 'rock', similar to Peter. In other cases, the given name originates from the Scottish surname Craig, which is also derived from the same Scottish Gaelic word. Cognate forms of creag include the Irish creig, Manx creg, and Welsh craig. The English word crag has the same origin (Old Irish crec). The given name Craig is popular in Scotland, and is used throughout the English-speaking world.

In North America it is often pronounced with a short vowel sound /krɛɡ/, while the British pronunciation uses the spelling pronunciation /kreɪɡ/.

== People ==
- Craig Abaya, American singer-songwriter
- Craig Ackerman (born 1974), American basketball announcer
- Craig Adams (disambiguation), several people
- Craig Albernaz (born 1982), American baseball coach
- Craig Alcock (born 1987), English professional footballer
- Craig Allen (born 1957), American television and radio meteorologist
- Craig Allen (born 1959), Guernsey footballer
- Craig Alpert, American film editor
- Craig Anton (born 1962), American actor
- Craig Armstrong (born 1959), Scottish composer
- Craig Armstrong (born 1975), English footballer and turned manager
- Craig B. Allen (born 1957), American diplomat and ambassador
- Craig B. Cooper (born 1949), American aquanaut
- Craig "Deuce" Bailey (born 2007), American football player
- Craig Barrett (born 1939), American business executive
- Craig Barrett (born 1971), New Zealand racewalker
- Craig Bartlett, (born 1956), American animator
- Craig Bellamy (born 1959), Australia rugby league coach
- Craig Bellamy (born 1979), Welsh footballer
- Craig Bierko (born 1964), American actor
- Craig Biggio (born 1965), American baseball player
- Craig Blomberg (born 1955), American New Testament scholar
- Craig Braham-Barrett (born 1988), English footballer
- Craig Breedlove (1937–2023), American racing driver
- Craig Breslow (born 1980), American baseball player and executive
- Craig Brown (born 1957), English writer and humorist
- Craig Brown, former coach of the Scotland national football team
- Craig Carnelia (born 1949) is an American musical theater composer and singer
- Craig Carton (born 1969), American radio personality
- Craig Cash (born 1960), English comedy writer and performer
- Craig Challen, Australian technical diver and cave explorer
- Craig Chaquico (born 1954), American guitarist
- Craig Charles (born 1964), British actor
- Craig Chester (born 1965), American actor, writer, and screenwriter
- Craig Claiborne (1920–2000), American restaurant critic, food journalist and book author
- Craig Cohen (born 1972), American radio personality
- Craig Cohn (born 1983), American professional wrestler
- Craig Considine (born 1986) Christian and American scholar of Islam
- Craig Cotton (born 1980), American football player
- Craig Counsell (born 1970), American baseball player and manager
- Craig Culver (born 1950), American fast food company founder
- Craig Curry (born 1961), American football player
- Craig Dandridge (born 2007), American football player
- Craig David (born 1981), English singer-songwriter
- Craig Davidson (born 1976), Canadian author
- Craig Davies (disambiguation), several people
- Craig Dawson (born 1990), English footballer
- Craig Derbyshire (born 1991), English professional boxer
- Craig Dimond (born 1964), Australian rugby league footballer
- Craig Disley (born 1981), English professional footballer
- Craig Douglas (1941–2026), British singer
- Craig Doyle (born 1970), Irish TV and radio presenter
- Craig Dudley (born 1979), English footballer
- Craig Dunn, American business professor
- Craig Ehlo (born 1961), American basketball player
- Craig Else (born 1964), American musician
- Craig Engels (born 1994), American middle-distance runner
- Craig Ervine (born 1985), Zimbabwean cricketer
- Craig Esherick (born 1956), American professor
- Craig Fairbrass (born 1964), English actor
- Craig Federighi (born 1969), senior vice president of software engineering at Apple Inc.
- Craig Ferguson (born 1962), British actor, comedian, and TV host
- Craig Field (born 1972), Australian rugby league coach and player
- Craig Flournoy (born 1951), American journalist
- Craig Fortnam (born 1967), English musician and conductor
- Craig Foster (disambiguation), several people
- Craig Frawley (born 1980), Australian rugby league footballer
- Craig Frost (born 1948), American keyboardist
- Craig Gannon (born 1966), English guitarist
- Craig Gardner (born 1986), English professional footballer
- Craig Gass (born 1970), American actor
- Craig Gazey (born 1982), British actor
- Craig Gilchrist (born 1970), South African basketball coach and former player
- Craig Gillespie (born 1967), Australian film director
- Craig Gilroy (born 1991), Irish rugby player
- Craig Goldman (born 1968), American politician
- Craig Goldy (born 1961), American guitarist
- Craig Gordon (born 1982), Scottish footballer
- Craig Grant (1968–2021), American poet and actor
- Craig Green (disambiguation), several people
- Craig Greenberg (born 1973), American businessman, lawyer, and politician
- Craig Groeschel (born 1967), American pastor
- Craig Gruber (1951–2015), American bassist
- Craig H. Barratt (born 1962), Australian technology executive
- Craig Hamann, American film director, screenwriter and actor
- Craig Hertwig (1952–2012), American football player
- Craig Heyward (1966–2006), American football player
- Craig Hill (disambiguation), several people
- Craig Hinton (1964–2006), British writer
- Craig Hooper (born 1959), Australian musician
- Craig Horner (born 1983), Australian actor
- Craig Hutchison (born 1975), Canadian freestyle swimmer
- Craig Huxley (born 1954), American actor and musician
- Craig J. Spence (1940–1989), American journalist and lobbyist
- Craig James (disambiguation), several people
- Craig Janney (born 1967), American ice hockey player
- Craig Johnston (born 1960), Australian soccer player
- Craig Jones (disambiguation), several people
- Craig Joubert (born 1977), South African rugby player
- Craig Juntunen (born 1954), American-Canadian football player
- Craig Kallman (born 1965), American entrepreneur and former DJ
- Craig Keith (born 1971), American football player
- Craig Kelly (disambiguation), several people
- Craig Kielburger (born 1982), Canadian human rights activist
- Craig Kieswetter (born 1987), English cricketer
- Craig Kilborn (born 1962), American comedian, actor and television host
- Craig Kimbrel (born 1988), American baseball player
- Craig Kyle (born 1971), American writer
- Craig L. Rice (born 1972), American politician
- Craig Larman (born 1958), Canadian computer scientist
- Craig Laundy (born 1971), former Australian politician
- Craig Leipold, American businessman
- Craig Levein (born 1964), Scottish football coach
- Craig Liddle (born 1971), former English footballer
- Craig Logan (born 1969), Scottish music manager
- Craig Lorentson (born 1965/1966–2010), Scottish singer-songwriter, lead vocalist of Lowlife
- Craig Low (born 1985), Australian comedian
- Craig Lowndes (born 1974), Australian racing driver
- Craig Luschenat, American basketball coach and player
- Craig Lynes (born 1981), Scottish footballer
- Craig Mabbitt (born 1987), American singer-songwriter
- Craig Mack (1970–2018), American rapper
- Craig Mackellar (born 1979), Scottish cricketer
- Craig MacLean (born 1971), Scottish cyclist
- Craig MacTavish, (born 1958) American hockey player
- Craig Mazin (born 1971), American writer, director, and producer
- Craig McCracken (born 1971), American cartoonist
- Craig McKinley (disambiguation), several people
- Craig McLachlan, (born 1965) Australian actor and musician
- Craig McRae (born 1973), Australian rules footballer and coach
- Craig Melchert, (born 1945) American linguist
- Craig Melvin (born 1979), American television journalist
- Craig Menear (born c. 1958), American business executive
- Craig Michael Wheeler, American politician
- Craig Millar (born 1976), Canadian ice hockey player
- Craig Millar (born 1990), New Zealand rugby union player
- Craig Miller (disambiguation), several people
- Craig Minervini, American sports broadcaster
- Craig Mokhiber (born 1960), American United Nations (UN) human rights official
- Craig Montoya (born 1970), American musician
- Craig Morgan (born 1964), American country singer
- Craig Mottram (born 1980), Australian runner
- Craig Mundie (born 1949), American businessperson
- Craig Murray (born 1958), Scottish author, human rights activist and journalist
- Craig Newmark (born 1952), American entrepreneur and Craigslist founder
- Craig Nicholls (born 1977), Australian musician
- Craig Noone (born 1987), English footballer
- Craig Nunenmacher, American musician
- Craig Ochs (born 1981), American football player
- Craig Olejnik, Canadian actor
- Craig Oliver (disambiguation), several people
  - Craig Oliver (born 1969), British news editor, producer and media executive
- Craig Owens (born 1984), American musician
- Craig Parker (born 1970), New Zealand actor
- Craig Parry (born 1966), Australian professional golfer
- Craig Pattison (born 1971), Canadian musician
- Craig Pearce, Australian screenwriter and actor
- Craig Phillips (born 1971), English television personality and builder
- Craig Pittman (born 1959), American Marine and professional wrestler
- Craig Porter Jr. (born 2000), American basketball player
- Craig Puki (born 1957), American football player
- Craig Quinnell (born 1975), Welsh rugby union player
- Craig Raine (born 1944), English poet
- Craig Ramsay (born 1951), Canadian ice hockey coach and player
- Craig Reedie (1941–2026), Scottish sports administrator
- Craig Reid (disambiguation), several people
- Craig Reucassel (born 1976), Australian radio and television presenter
- Craig Revel Horwood (born 1965), Australian-British dancer and choreographer
- Craig Reynolds (disambiguation), several people
- Craig Rice (1908–1957), American author
- Craig Richard Nelson (1947–2025), American actor
- Craig Roberts (disambiguation), several people
- Craig Robertson (disambiguation), several people
- Craig Robinson (disambiguation), several people
  - Craig Robinson (actor) (born 1971), American actor and stand-up comedian
- Craig Rodwell (1940–1993), American gay rights activist and founder of the first gay bookstore
- Craig Rothfeld, American businessman
- Craig Ruddy (1968–2022), Australian artist
- Craig Russell (disambiguation), several people
- Craig S. Atkins (1903–1990), American judge
- Craig Sager (1951–2016), American sports reporter
- Craig Sams (born 1944), British businessman and author
- Craig Scott (disambiguation), several people
- Craig Serjeant (born 1951), Australian cricketer
- Craig Setari, American musician
- Craig Sheffer (born 1960), American actor
- Craig Shoemaker (born 1959), American stand-up comedian
- Craig Simpson (born 1967), Canadian ice hockey player
- Craig Smith (disambiguation), several people
- Craig Spence (born 1974), Australian professional golfer
- Craig Spence (fl. 1990–present), British historian and archaeologist
- Craig Steven Wright (born 1970), Australian computer scientist and businessman
- Craig Stevens (disambiguation), several people
  - Craig Stevens (1918–2000), American actor
- Craig Stewart (1928–2009), Canadian politician
- Craig Stewart(1956–2023), Australian rules footballer
- Craig Stott (born 1990), Australian actor
- Craig Sutherland (born 1988), Scottish footballer
- Craig T. Nelson (born 1944), American actor
- Craig Taborn (born 1970), American musician
- Craig Terrill (born 1980), American football player
- Craig Thomas (disambiguation), several people
- Craig Thompson (born 1975), American cartoonist
- Craig Titus (born 1965), American murderer
- Craig Tully (born 1976), Scottish footballer and manager
- Craig Unger (born 1949), American journalist and writer
- Craig Venter (1946–2026), American biologist
- Craig Washington (born 1941), American politician
- Craig Wasson (born 1954), American actor
- Craig Waters (born 1956), American lawyer and court spokesperson
- Craig Wayans (born 1976), American writer, television producer, and actor
- Craig Wedren (born 1969), American singer-songwriter
- Craig Williams (disambiguation), several people
- Craig Williamson (born 1946), South African policeman and spy
- Craig Winn, American businessman
- Craig Woodson (born 2001), American football player
- Craig Yoho (born 1999), American baseball player
- Craig Young (disambiguation), multiple people
- Craig Zadan (1949–2018), American film producer
- Craig Zobel, American filmmaker and actor
- Craig Zonca (born 1984), Australian radio and television presenter
- Craig Zucker (born 1975), American politician

== Fictional characters ==
- Craig Dean, in the soap opera Hollyoaks
- Craig Dixon (EastEnders), short-lived EastEnders character
- Craig Feldspar, a recurring character in Malcolm in the Middle, portrayed by David Anthony Higgins
- Craig Pelton, a recurring character on Community
- Craig Tucker, a recurring South Park character

== See also ==
- Craig (disambiguation)
- Craig (surname)
- List of Irish-language given names
- List of Scottish Gaelic given names
