= Craig House =

Craig House or Craig Farm may refer to:

== Places ==
=== United Kingdom ===
- Craig House, Edinburgh, Scotland; a 16th-century structure formerly housing the 20th-century Craig House Hospital
- Craighouse, Jura, Argyll and Bute, Scotland

=== United States ===
- Craig House (New Jersey), Freehold, NJ, on the grounds of Monmouth Battlefield State Park
- Craig-Bryan House, Bentonville, AR, listed on the NRHP in Arkansas
- Craig Mansion, Phoenix, AZ, listed on the NRHP in Arizona
- Robert Craig Plantation, Lawrenceville, GA, listed on the NRHP in Georgia
- William Houston Craig House, Noblesville, IN, listed on the NRHP in Indiana
- Spears-Craig House, Danville, KY, listed on the NRHP in Kentucky
- Newton Craig House and Penitentiary Buildings Complex, Georgetown, KY, listed on the NRHP in Kentucky
- Craig-Flowers House, Vicksburg, MS, listed on the NRHP in Mississippi
- Craig-Seay House, Como, MS, listed on the NRHP in Mississippi
- Craig Farmstead, Gastonia, NC, listed on the NRHP in North Carolina
- Reinhardt-Craig House, Kiln and Pottery Shop, Vale, NC, listed on the NRHP in North Carolina
- Craig House (Lancaster, South Carolina), listed on the NRHP in South Carolina
- Mrs. Edward B. Craig House, Forest Hills, TN, listed on the NRHP in Tennessee
- Craig-Beasley House, Franklin, TN, listed on the NRHP in Tennessee
- Craig Family Farm, Linden, TN, listed on the NRHP in Tennessee
- Heard-Craig House, McKinney, TX, listed on the NRHP in Texas
- Payne-Craig House, Janesville, WI, listed on the NRHP in Wisconsin

== People ==
- Craig House (baseball) (born 1977), former pitcher in Major League Baseball

== Other uses ==
- House of Craig, an Australian fashion house operated by Keri Craig-Lee

== See also ==
- House (surname)
- House (disambiguation)
- Craig (given name)
- Craig (disambiguation)
- All pages with titles containing "Craig" and "House"
