= Craig Hospital (disambiguation) =

Craig Hospital may refer to:

- Heathe N. Craig Joint Theater Hospital, Bagram Airfield, Parwan, Afghanistan; a former U.S. military hospital
- Craig's Hospital, Victoria, Gozo, Malta; see Michael Davidson (journalist)
- Castle Craig Hospital (est. 1988), Blythe Bridge, Peeblesshire, Scotland, UK; a residential drug and alcohol abuse rehabilitation centre in a country manor
- New Craigs Psychiatric Hospital (est. 2000), Leachkin, Inverness, Scotland, UK
- Craig House, Edinburgh, Lothian, Scotland, UK; formerly the Craig House Hospital (1878–1972), a psychiatric hospital (1878–2000)
- Craig Hospital, Englewood, Colorado, USA; a neurorehabilitation and research hospital, founded in 1907 as a medical asylum for tuberculosis, carrying the founder Craig's name since 1914, called exactly "Craig Hospital" since 1975
- Craig Colony for Epileptics (1896–1968), Sonyea, Livingston County, New York State, USA; a residential hospital, a medical asylum for epileptics
- Craig House (New Jersey), USA; a historic house in Monmouth County that served in 1778 as a U.S. War of Independence hospital for the British

== See also ==
- All pages with titles containing "Craig" and "Hospital"
- Craig (disambiguation)
