= Craig Spence =

Craig Spence may refer to:

- Craig Spence (golfer) (born 1974)
- Craig Spence (archaeology) (fl. 1990–present), historian and archaeologist
- Craig J. Spence (1940–1989), lobbyist who committed suicide after being named a client of a prostitution ring
