= Craig Wheeler =

Craig Wheeler may refer to:

- J. Craig Wheeler (born 1943), American astronomer
- Craig Michael Wheeler, member of the New Hampshire House of Representatives
