= Craig =

Craig may refer to:

== People and fictional characters ==
- Craig (surname), including a list of people and fictional characters
- Craig (given name), including a list of people and fictional characters
- Clan Craig, a Scottish clan

== Places ==
=== United States ===
- Craig, Alaska, a city
- Craig, Colorado, a city
- Craig, Iowa, a city
- Craig, Missouri, a city
- Craig, Montana, an unincorporated place
- Craig, Nebraska, a village
- Craig, Ohio, an unincorporated community
- Craig County, Oklahoma
- Craig County, Virginia
- Craig Township, Switzerland County, Indiana
- Craig Township, Burt County, Nebraska
- Mount Craig (Colorado)
- Mount Craig (North Carolina)
- Craig Mountain, Oregon
- Craig Field (airport), a public airport near Selma, Alabama, formerly:
  - Craig Air Force Base, a former United States Air Force base
- Craig Hospital, a neurorehabilitation and research hospital in Englewood, Colorado, United States
- Fort Craig, a United States Army fort in New Mexico
- The Craig School, an independent, private coeducational day school in Mountain Lakes and Montville, New Jersey, United States
- Craig Road (Las Vegas), Nevada

=== Canada ===
- Mount Craig (Yukon), Canada
- Chemin Craig, a historical road in Quebec, Canada

=== Other ===
- Port Craig, Fiordland, Southland, New Zealand; a former logging town
- Craig Road (Singapore)

== Groups, organizations ==
- Craig Electronics, a consumer electronics company
- Craig Wireless, a defunct Canadian media and communication company

== Other uses ==
- Craig (landform), a rocky hill or mountain often having large chasms or sharp indentations
- "Craig" (song)
- Craig tube, a piece of scientific apparatus
- Craig (elephant) (1972–2026), African elephant

== See also ==
- Craig v. Boren, a U.S. Supreme Court case
- Craic, term for news, gossip, etc.
- Craig Hospital (disambiguation)
- Craig House (disambiguation)
- Crag (disambiguation)
