= Mayor Craig =

Mayor Craig may, funnily enough, refer to two unrelated first female mayors of two different Manchesters, both liberals:

- Bev Craig, 2nd mayor of (Greater) Manchester, England
- Joyce Craig, 56th mayor of Manchester, New Hampshire

== See also ==
- Craig Brown, 19th mayor of Whangārei, New Zealand
- Craig K. Brown, 57th mayor of Galveston, Texas
- Craig Greenberg, 3rd mayor of Louisville, Kentucky
- Craig (disambiguation)
