= Craig Hill =

Craig Hill may refer to:

- Craig Hill (actor) (1926–2014), American film actor
- Craig Hill (comedian), Scottish comedian, TV presenter and actor
- Craig Hill (rugby union) (born 1982), Welsh rugby union player
- Craig Hill (soccer) (born 1987), American soccer player
- Craig Hill (footballer) (born 1991), Northern Irish footballer
- Craig L. Hill (born 1949), American inorganic chemist
- Craig Hill (New York), a mountain located in the Catskill Mountains
- Craig A. Hill, American statistician

== See also ==
- Richard Craig Hill (1934–2012), Canadian automobile racer
