= Craig Jones =

Craig Jones may refer to:

- Craig Jones (grappler) (born 1991), Australian grappler and Brazilian jiu-jitsu competitor
- Craig Jones (musician) (born 1972), American musician
- Craig Jones (motorcyclist) (1985–2008), English motorcycle racer
- Craig Jones (cricketer) (born 1978), Australian cricketer
- Craig Jones (Royal Navy officer) (born 1968), British Royal Navy officer and LGBT rights defender in the UK Royal Navy
- Craig Jones (footballer, born 1977), Welsh footballer, current head coach of George Washington University's men's soccer team
- Craig Jones (footballer, born 1987), Welsh footballer
- Craig Jones (footballer, born 1989), English footballer
- Craig Jones (rower) (born 1972), Australian rower
- Craig Jones, fictional character in the Friday Movie franchise
