= Greg Robinson =

Greg Robinson may refer to:

- Greg Robinson (offensive tackle) (born 1992), American football offensive tackle
- Greg Robinson (American football coach) (1951–2022), American football coach
- Greg Robinson (running back) (born 1969), American football running back
- Gregory L. Robinson (born about 1960), director of the James Webb Space Telescope

== See also ==
- Greg Robinson-Randall or Greg Randall (born 1978), American football offensive tackle
- Craig Robinson (disambiguation)
