= Craig Robertson =

Craig Robertson may refer to:

- Craig Robertson (footballer) (born 1963), Scottish former football player and coach
- Craig Robertson (American football) (born 1988), American football linebacker
- Craig Robertson (badminton) (born 1970), Scottish badminton player
- Craig Robertson (writer), see Bouchercon XLVII
- Craig DeLeeuw Robertson (c. 1949–2023), American firearm collector killed in a confrontation with FBI agents after threatening to assassinate Joe Biden

== See also ==
- Craig Robinson (disambiguation)
