= Craig Davies =

Craig Davies may refer to:

- Craig Davies (footballer) (born 1986), Wales international football player
- Craig Davies (special effects artist), movie model maker, art designer and visual effects director
- Craig Davies (musician), English singer/songwriter
- Craig Davies (field hockey) (born 1967), Australian field hockey player
- Craig Davies (racing driver) (born 1960), entrepreneur and race car driver

== See also ==
- Craig Davis (disambiguation)
