= Craig Foster (disambiguation) =

Craig Foster (born 1969) is an Australian former association footballer and current commentator and human rights advocate.

Craig Foster may also refer to:

- Craig Foster (businessman), CEO of Clean Seas, an Australian seafood company
- Craig Foster (filmmaker), South African documentary filmmaker
- Craig Foster (Jamaican footballer) (born 1991), Jamaican footballer
- Craig Foster, a character in the 1967 film Here We Go Round the Mulberry Bush
- Craig Foster, commander of VIP Protection Unit
