= Craig Russell =

Craig Russell may refer to:

- Craig Russell (Canadian actor) (1948–1990), female impersonator and actor
- Craig Russell (English actor) (born 1977)
- Craig L. Russell (born 1949), software architect
- Craig H. Russell (born 1951), American composer of classical music
- Craig Russell (British author) (born 1956), British-born novelist and short story writer
- Craig Russell (footballer) (born 1974), English football player
- P. Craig Russell (born 1951), American comic book writer, artist, and illustrator
