= Craig Davis =

Craig Davis may refer to:

- Craig Davis (American football) (born 1985), American football wide receiver
- Craig Davis (Australian footballer) (born 1954), Australian rules footballer
- Craig Davis (author), author and Middle East and South Asia expert

== See also ==
- Craig Davies (disambiguation)
