= Craig Reid =

Craig Reid may refer to:

- Craig Reid (footballer, born 1985), English footballer
- Craig Reid (footballer, born 1986), Scottish footballer
- Craig Reid (born 1962), member of Scottish band The Proclaimers
