= Craig Thomas =

Craig Thomas may refer to:

- Craig L. Thomas (1933–2007), American politician who represented Wyoming in the United States Senate from 1995 to 2007
- Craig Thomas (author) (1942–2011), Welsh writer of techno-thrillers, whose best-known novel, Firefox (1977), became a successful film
- Craig Thomas (screenwriter) (born 1975), American writer-producer who is the co-creator of the CBS sitcom How I Met Your Mother
