= Craig McKinley =

Craig McKinley may refer to:

- Craig R. McKinley (born 1952), United States Air Force and National Guard general
- Craig McKinley (physician) (1964–2013), Canadian physician and aquanaut

== See also ==
- Craig Mackinlay (born 1966), British politician
