= Craig Allen (footballer) =

Guernsey footballer (born 1959)

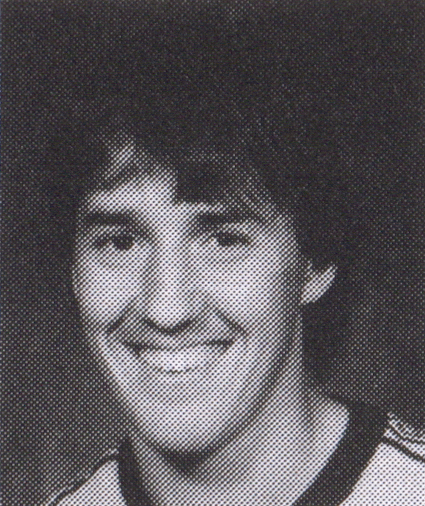
- Allen circa 1984

Personal information
- Date of birth: 2 October 1959 (age 67)
- Place of birth: Guernsey, Channel Islands
- Position: Striker

Senior career*
Years	Team	Apps	(Gls)
1979–1981	California Surf	74	(19)
1979–1981	California Surf (indoor)	29	(36)
1981–1982	New Jersey Rockets (indoor)	22	(22)
1982–1988	Cleveland Force (indoor)	254	(275)

International career
- Guernsey
- * Club domestic league appearances and goals

Craig Allen is a former Guernsey association football striker who played professionally in the North American Soccer League and Major Indoor Soccer League.

== Professional ==
In 1979, the nineteen-year-old Allen came to California on vacation. While in California, he attended an open tryout with the California Surf of the North American Soccer League and gained a contract offer. Over three years, he played three NASL outdoor and two NASL indoor seasons with the Surf.

In 1981, he moved to the New Jersey Rockets of the Major Indoor Soccer League. After one season, he moved to the Cleveland Force where he played for six seasons. In 1988, the Force lost to the San Diego Sockers in the MISL championship.

In June 1988, the Force released Allen. By this time he had played 254 league games, scored 275 goals and added 180 assists with Cleveland.

== National team ==
In March 1993, Allen scored a record 7 goals for Guernsey in their 10–0 win against Alderney in the semi-final of the Muratti Vase. This was his first Muratti-appearance since 1978. (Although he failed to find the net in the final as Guernsey lost 1–2 against Jersey).

== Personal life ==
Craig's son, Ross Allen, is also a competitive footballer, and was named Guernsey Football Association Division One Player of the Year for 2008–09. He currently plays for Guernsey in the Isthmian League Division One South. In August 2011, he was allegedly scouted by Swindon Town.
