= Craig Reynolds =

Craig Reynolds may refer to:

- Craig Reynolds (actor) (1907–1949), American film actor
- Craig Reynolds (American football) (born 1996), American football player
- Craig Reynolds (baseball) (born 1952), baseball player
- Craig Reynolds (computer graphics) (born 1953), computer graphics artist
- Craig Reynolds (soccer) (born 1953), retired American soccer defender
