= Craig Green =

Craig Green may refer to:

- Craig Green (designer) (born 1986), English fashion designer
- Craig Green (rugby union) (born 1961), New Zealand rugby union player
- Craig Green (wrestler) (born 1964), Australian wrestler

== See also ==
- Craig Greenberg (born 1973), American businessman, lawyer, and politician
- Craig Greenhill (born 1972), Australian rugby league footballer
- Craig Greenwood (born 1963), New Zealand sailor
