= Craig, Ohio =

Unincorporated community in Ohio, U.S.

Coordinates: 40°01′25″N 81°31′02″W

Craig is an unincorporated community in Guernsey County, in the U.S. state of Ohio.

== History ==
A post office called Craig was established in 1890, and remained in operation until 1909. Besides the post office, Craig had a country store.
