= Craig Williams =

Craig Williams may refer to:

== People ==
- Human Tornado (born 1983), real name Craig Williams, professional wrestler
- Craig Williams (cricketer) (born 1984), Namibian cricketer
- Craig Williams (Australian footballer) (born 1954), Australian rules footballer
- Craig Williams (jockey) (born 1977), Australian jockey
- Craig Williams (British politician) (born 1985), British politician
- Craig Williams (Iowa politician), member of the Iowa Senate
- Craig Williams (Pennsylvania politician) (born 1965), former Marine and member of the Pennsylvania House of Representatives
- Craig E. Williams, Vietnam War veteran and co-founder of the Vietnam Veterans of America Foundation
- Craig Williams Jr. (born 1989), American basketball player

== Characters ==
- Craig Williams, the title character of the animated TV series Craig of the Creek
