= Craig Oliver =

Craig Oliver may refer to:

- Craig Oliver (British journalist) (born 1969), former BBC executive and communications director in David Cameron's government
- Craig Oliver (Canadian journalist) (born 1938), reporter for Canada's CTV television network
