= Craig Robinson (designer) =

American fashion designer (born 1972)

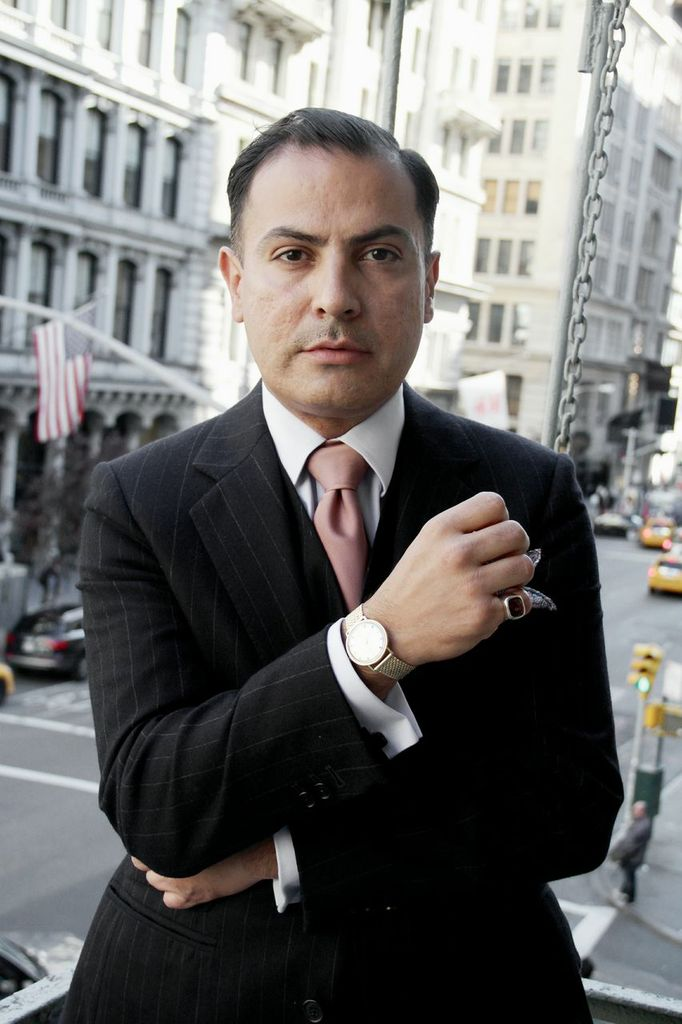
Robinson in New York City

Craig Robinson (born 1972 in New Mexico) is an American fashion designer.

== Biography ==
Robinson started out as a self-taught bespoke tailor before establishing his label, Craig Robinson New York, in 2001. He is best known for dressing prominent New York bands and for sharply tailored designs mixing old-world tailoring skills with a contemporary sensibility. In 2001 Robinson opened a bespoke atelier on Lower 5th Avenue now acclaimed for hand-tailored suits, accessories, and custom shirts. His work has been featured in The New York Times, L’Uomo Vogue, Blackbook, Paper, Time Out, Surface, Details, and L.A. Confidential.

Robinson went on to open his first store on Route 66 in 1992 at the age of 20 in Albuquerque New Mexico. In 1995 Robinson moved to New York. While fine-tuning his craft of fine tailoring, he also worked in a hat shop, blocking and trimming custom hats.

In 1998 he opened the door to his Atelier on 5th Ave in the Flat Iron district, creating superior handmade, custom and Made-to-Measure suiting for a host of popular musicians such as Interpol, Death Cab for Cutie, and Peter Bjorn and John. Robinson had also outfitted celebrities such as Willem Dafoe, and Morgan Freeman.

In 2007 Craig Robinson New York was featured in the exhibition New York Fashion Now along with Sean 'Diddy' Combs, John Varvatos, Miguel Adrover, Thom Browne and others.

In 2012 Craig Robinson opened his first flagship store and ROBINSON BROOKLYN in Williamsburg Brooklyn, offering ready to wear collections, Bespoke and made to measure.

In 2014 Craig Robinson was featured in Man of the world Magazine for his craft and design.

In 2015 The Roxy Hotel in New york city chose Craig Robinson to Uniform the entire Hotel labeling him Executive designer of wardrobe.

== Bespoke clothing ==
Robinson launched his first ready to wear collection in 2009.

Actor Morgan Freeman wore a Craig Robinson bespoke tuxedo on the red carpet at the 2010 Oscars.
