= Craig Scott =

Craig Scott may refer to:

- Craig Scott (golfer) (born 1983), Australian golfer
- Craig Scott (singer) (born 1950), New Zealand pop singer
- Craig Scott (politician) (born 1962), Canadian politician
