= Craig L. Russell =

American mathematician

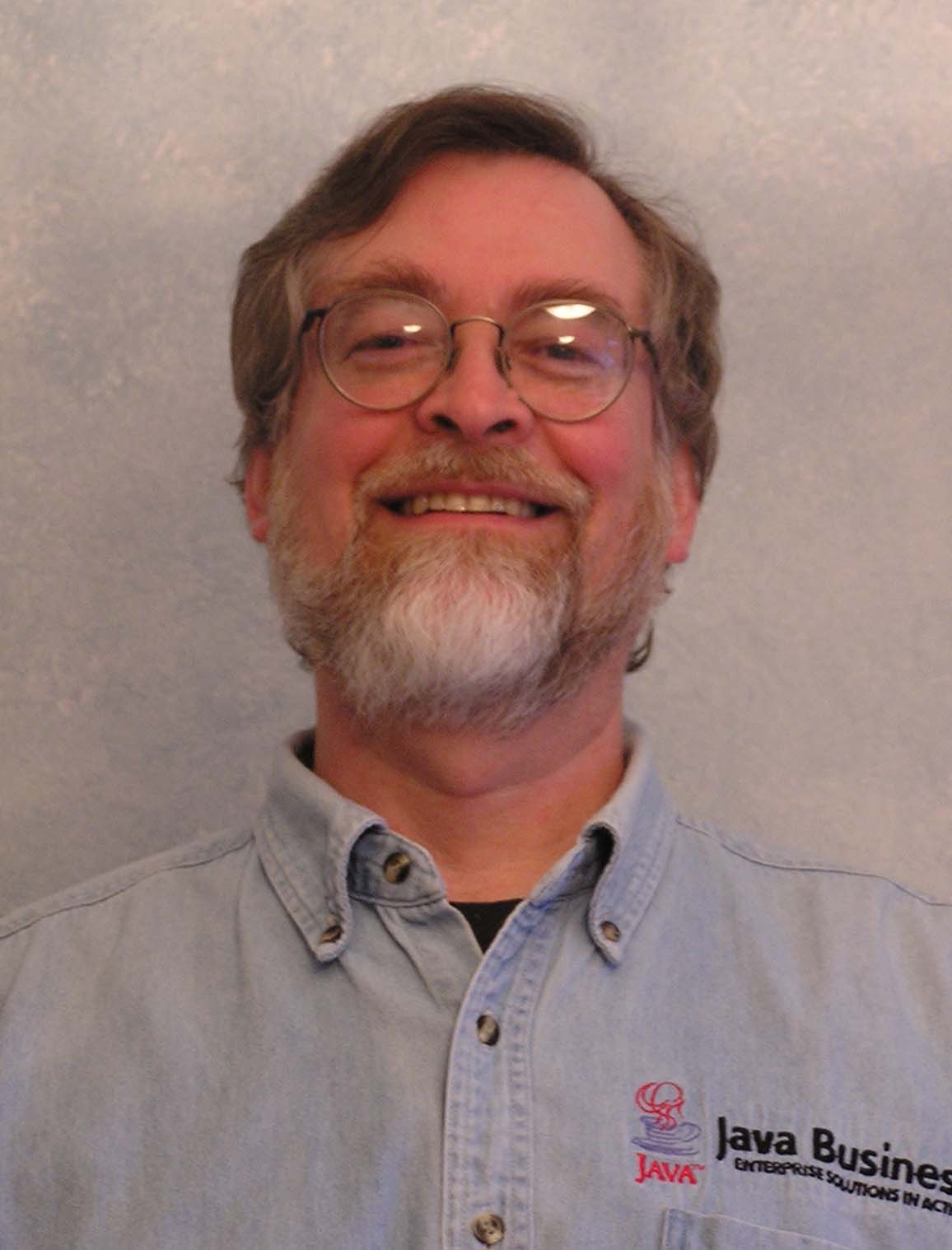

Craig L. Russell (born January 6, 1949) is an American software architect and author. He contributed to the book 97 Things Every Software Architect Should Know. He co-authored Java Data Objects ISBN 0596002769

== Biography ==
=== Early life and education ===
Craig L. Russell was born January 6, 1949, in New York City. He attended Glen Rock High School and graduated in 1966. He graduated from Harvard University in 1971 with a BA in Applied Mathematics.

=== Career ===
Craig joined Sun Microsystems to lead the development of Object Relational Mapping. He initiated the creation of Java Data Objects, for which he was specification lead for JSR 12 and JSR 243. He was the architect responsible for developing the implementation of Container Managed Persistence for Sun's Java Enterprise Edition Application Server.

Craig was the contributing editor for the Object Data Management Group Standard: 3.0 Java binding. He wrote "Bridging the Object-Relational Divide."

Craig is a Director and Member of The Apache Software Foundation and a member of the Apache Incubator project responsible for bringing projects into Apache. He served as board chair for the 2019–2020 term.
