= Craig Davies (musician) =

English singer-songwriter

- Years active: 1988–1990
- Label: Rough Trade Records

Craig Davies is an English singer/songwriter from Manchester, who was active from 1988 to 1990 and released two albums on the Rough Trade music label. He was at one point vocalist for the band The Cradle, but left after signing a solo deal with Rough Trade. He has also collaborated with Vini Reilly, Ben Watt and Badly Drawn Boy.

== Background ==
Described as having a strangely flexible and beguiling voice, he was also referred to by Culture Catch as a far from conventional troubadour out of time.

== Career ==
Davies recorded the song "Euston Railway Station Blues" which was released in the late 1980s. Davies released the album, Groovin' on a Shaft Cycle which was released on Rough Trade 132 in 1990. It was reviewed by Hi-Fi News & Record Review in the magazine's Volume 35 issue.

According to a Culture Catch article published in July 2008, he had recently returned to the studio.

== Albums ==
- Like Narcissus (Rough Trade, 1988)`
- Groovin' on a Shaft Cycle (Rough Trade, 1990)

== EPs ==
- "I Don't Want It" (Rough Trade, 1987)

== Singles ==
- "Jennifer Holiday" (Rough Trade, 1988)
