= Craig Jones (Royal Navy officer) =

Royal Navy officer (born 1968)

Craig Jones MBE
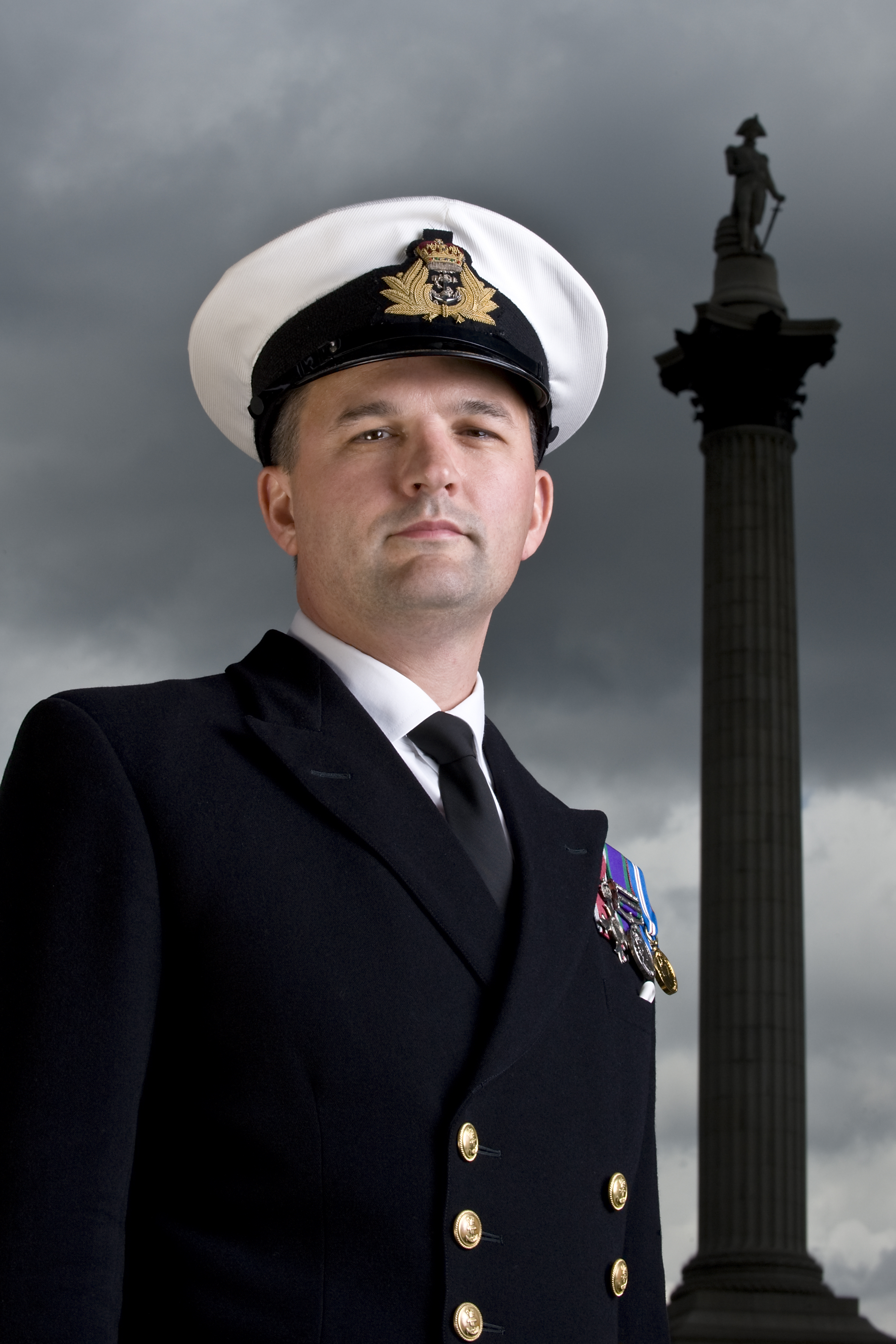
- Craig in 2008
- Born: 17 July 1968 (age 58); Bingley, England
- Education: University of Portsmouth
- Occupations: Author, Equality Campaigner and formerly Lt Cdr RN

Craig Jones MBE (born 17 July 1968) is a former Royal Navy Officer and LGBT+ equality advocate in the UK armed forces. Jones was appointed Member of the Order of the British Empire in the 2006 New Years Honours List for services to Equality and Human Rights in the Armed Forces.

== Early life and education ==
Jones was born on 17 July 1968 in Bingley, West Yorkshire. His father was a storeman and his mother a dinner lady. He was educated at Bingley Grammar School prior to joining the University of Portsmouth. He was a member of Southampton University Royal Naval Unit in the rank of Midshipman Royal Navy Reserves between 1986 and 1989 and trained in HMS FENCER. Mid-way through his degree studies he was offered a Commission in the Royal Navy.

== Naval career ==
Jones joined Britannia Royal Naval College Dartmouth in 1989 and passed out in April 1990. He completed his Fleet Time in HMS UPTON, HMS ARIADNE and HMS ALACRITY, before joining the Fleet as a Lieutenant in HMS CORNWALL in 1992. He was the Royal Navy's first Helicopter Fast Rope Boarding Officer and led operations to clear stranded shipping from the Shatt Al Arab after the 1st Gulf War. He was an executive officer in the border regions of Northern Ireland during "the troubles" conducting counter-terrorism boardings and searches in the coastal regions. Later he was Deputy Navigator of the aircraft carrier HMS INVINCIBLE during Operation Bolton.

After completing the Principal Warfare Officers Course, he was the Operations Officer of the Amphibious Flagship HMS FEARLESS. In 2004 he was the Fleet Signals Intelligence Officer at Northwood HQ and his final role was at the Ministry of Defence as the Maritime Signals Intelligence Procurement Officer. From the day of the lifting of the gay ban on 12 January 2000 and until leaving the Service in 2008, Jones led the LGBT+ community in the British Armed Forces and negotiated with Service Chiefs the unravelling of the impact of decades of prohibition.

== Military law and homosexuality ==
Homosexuality was decriminalised under the Sexual Offences Act 1967, but this did not extend to members of the armed forces where men & women serving were dishonourably discharged if their sexuality was discovered.

Warrant Officer Robert Ely, a bandsman who joined the army at seventeen and served for twenty years before being dismissed for his homosexuality, set up Rank Outsiders in 1994 with Lt Elaine Chambers, a Queen Alexandra's Royal Army Nursing Corps nurse who had endured a harrowing dismissal from a much loved career. Royal Navy Officer Edmund Hall later joined Rank Outsiders and set up the Armed Forces Legal Challenge Group in 1995 and is credited with winning the support of Stonewall to drive the British Government into lifting the ban.

In 1998, the campaign worked with Stonewall on behalf of Jeanette Smith, who had been thrown out of the Royal Air Force, and Duncan Lustig Prean, a Royal Navy commander who was being dismissed. They asked Stonewall to arrange legal representation, leading to a long battle through the courts with Graham Grady and John Beckett also joining the case. Although the judges in the High Court and Court of Appeal said that they felt the ban was not justified they could not overturn it and Stonewall had to take the case to Strasbourg and the European Court of Human Rights before winning it.

On 12 January 2000 the long-standing ban on homosexuals in the British Armed Forces was finally lifted. Announcing the change to Parliament, the Secretary of State for Defence, Rt Hon Geoff Hoon acknowledge that "There will be those who would have preferred to continue to exclude homosexual, but the law is the law. We cannot choose the decisions we implement. The status quo is simply not an option."

== Campaigner ==
As the "gay ban" was lifted Jones came out in an ill-prepared Armed Forces which had opposed the lifting of the ban for decades. By his own admission he forcefully petitioned Service Chiefs to unravel the impact of decades of prohibition, and is widely credited with driving change at a pace which was counter to the MODs intent. In 2005 the Royal Navy was the first armed service to sign up to Stonewall's Diversity Champions programme.

In 2006, then a relatively junior officer, he was exceptionally given leave by the MOD to speak in the United States Congress tacitly advocating for the repeal of "Don't ask, don't tell" (DADT) with members of Congress and Staffers.

Jones continued to receive criticism at the Ministry of Defence for speaking openly about the resistance of some service chiefs to change, notably about the MOD not allowing members of the armed forces to march in uniform at Pride. In 2006 the Royal Navy was given permission to march in uniform at Pride followed by the Royal Air Force in 2007 and Army in 2008.

He returned to Washington in 2009 for discussions at Brookings as the Pentagon prepared for their own policy change. In 2008, Jones was engaged as a consultant to the Equality and Human Rights Commission during their compliance investigation of the alleged harassment of women in the Armed Forces. The enquiry found that the Armed Forces were making steady progress and working towards greater compliance.

Jones was appointed a Member of the Order of the British Empire (MBE) in the 2006 New Year Honours for services to Equality and Human Rights in the Armed Forces, and completed his service career in 2008.

To mark the 20th anniversary of the lifting of the British Armed Forces 'gay ban' Jones edited and published Fighting with Pride, a charity anthology book which brings together LGBT+ servicemen and women who have served in every conflict since WW2 to the present. Minister of State for the Armed Forces, Anne-Marie Trevellyan MP read extracts from Fighting with Pride at a 20th anniversary reception at the House of Commons hosted by Johnny Mercer MP.

Fighting with Pride was launched as a charity, supporting LGBT+ veterans on 12 January 2020 with Craig as the Chief Executive, joined later in the year by Caroline Paige MBE. He was subsequently appointed as Executive Chair and in April 2024 leading the charities reparations campaign.

In June 2021 Craig Jones MBE and Caroline Paige MBE gave evidence to the Select Committee on the Armed Forces Bill about the hardships faced by LGBT+ veterans. They were strongly supported by all parties and amendments were tabled to the Bill in Consequence. Following this and further campaigning by Fighting with Pride the Conservative government pledged to commission an Independent Review into the "impact that the pre-2000 Ban on Homosexuality in the armed forces has had on LGBT veterans today".

The LGBT Veterans Independent Review, chaired by the Rt Hon Lord Etherton, examined the experiences of personnel perceived to be LGBT between 1967 and 2000 who were impacted by the ban on homosexuality in the Armed Forces. The Review heard statements of those who were victims of the 'gay ban' some victims have died a natural death since the Ban was removed. Others have taken their own lives. Many of those still living have attempted to die by suicide or have thought about doing so. Those statements give shocking evidence of a culture of homophobia, and of bullying, blackmail and sexual assaults, abusive investigations into sexual orientation and sexual preference, disgraceful medical examinations, including conversion therapy, peremptory discharges, and appalling consequences in terms of mental health and wellbeing, homelessness, employment, personal relationships and financial hardship.

The Report, published in July 2023 made 49 recommendations, stating that the policy was wrong and unjust. The Government accepted all of the Reviews recommendations, which aimed to reduce the enduring impact of the 'gay ban' upon the lives of those affected and recognise the service of veterans who served in the years of the ban. One of the 49 recommendations made in the Final Report of the LGBT Veterans Independent Review was that £50M should be set aside to make reparations payments. Leading the LGBT Veterans Coalition, Jones campaigned strongly for greater financial resource. On 23 October 2024 an open letter asking the Government to look for further funding signed by the Chief Executives of the Members of the Coalition was sent to the Prime minister. On 12 December 2024 the Financial Recognition Scheme and other restorative measures were announced and debated in the House of Commons. The sum of £75M was announced for financial reparations and the application process opened the following day.

Among the recommendations made by Caroline Paige MBE and Craig at Fighting with Pride was the creation of a national memorial to honour LGBT+ personnel affected by the ban. This recommendation was fulfilled in October 2025, when a national memorial service was held at the National Memorial Arboretum. The event was attended by His Majesty King Charles III, senior Government and Armed Forces representatives, and LGBT+ veterans, marking a historic moment of recognition and remembrance for those who served under the ban.

To mark the 25 year anniversary of the lifting of the 'gay ban' Jones published a second anthology book Serving with Pride which brought together 30 stories of LGBT+ individuals who served under the gay ban.

Jones is currently a member of the Veterans Advisory and Pensions Committee for the South East Region. Following successful achievement of the reparations, he stepped down as Head of Campaign and Trustee for Fighting with Pride in 2025.

In July 2025 he was awarded the honorary degree of Doctor of Science (honoris causa) by Northumbria University, "in recognition of his extraordinary courage, transformative leadership, and enduring commitment to justice, inclusion and the welfare of the LGBTQ+ Armed Forces Community." In reflecting on the award, Jones highlighted the vital partnership between Fighting With Pride and Northumbria's Northern Hub for Veterans and Military Families Research, whose landmark 2023 report Lost and Found: The LGBT+ Veteran Community and the Impacts of the Gay Ban played a pivotal role in shaping reparative measures and inclusive veteran support. Later in 2025, Jones was awarded a further Honorary Doctorate of the University of Portsmouth, his alma mater, recognising his leadership in LGBT+ advocacy and his contribution to advancing inclusion within the Armed Forces. The university described him as an “inspirational figure” whose work had helped deliver justice and visibility for LGBT+ veterans affected by the former ban on gay personnel in the military.

== Bibliography ==
- Jones, Craig (2019). Fighting with Pride LGBT In the Armed Forces. Pen & Sword. ISBN 978-1-5267-6525-3.
- Jones, Craig (2024). Serving with Pride. Pen & Sword. ISBN 978-1036123949.
- Summerskill, Ben (2006) The Way We Live Now: Gay and Lesbian Lives in the 20th Century. Continuum ISBN 978-0-8264-8785-8
