= Craig Robinson =

Craig Robinson may refer to:

- Craig Robinson (actor) (born 1971), American actor
- Craig Robinson (baseball) (born 1948), American former Major League baseball player
- Craig Robinson (basketball) (born 1962), American college basketball coach and brother of Michelle Obama
- Craig Robinson (designer) (born 1972), American fashion designer
- Craig Robinson (rugby league) (born 1985), English rugby league footballer

== See also ==
- Greg Robinson (disambiguation)
