= Michael Davidson (journalist) =

British writer (1897–1975)

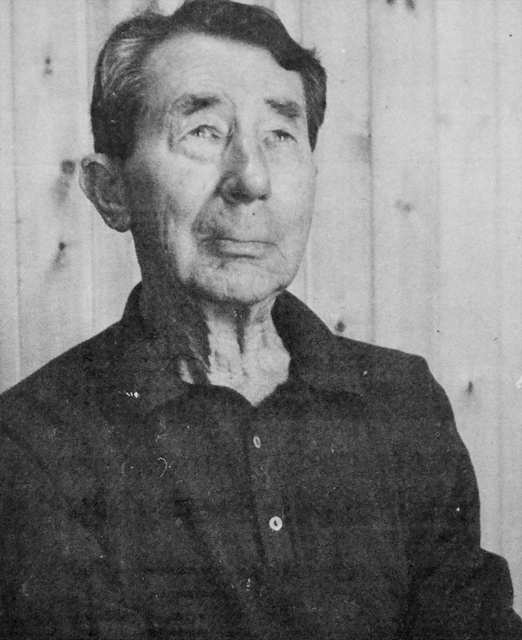
- Davidson in 1972
- Born: Michael Childers Davidson; 24 February 1897; Paddington, London, UK
- Died: 19 November 1975 (aged 78); Victoria, Malta
- Education: Lancing College
- Occupation: Journalist

Michael Childers Davidson (24 February 1897 – 19 November 1975) was a British journalist and memoirist.

== Life and work ==
Davidson was born in Paddington, on 24 February 1897, into an upper-middle-class family but he was brought up in Guernsey from the ages of one to eleven when the family moved to Bitterne in Hampshire. He was educated at Lancing.

Davidson joined the army in 1914 and was wounded at Paschendaele in 1916. After the war, he made an unsuccessful attempt to set himself up as a farmer in South Africa. In 1922, he became a newspaper reporter, initially in Norwich. In 1928, he moved to Berlin where, apart from a stint as a proof-reader in the International Labour Office in Geneva, he was to remain until 1933, supporting himself as a translator of leftist books and articles. He also joined the Communist Party of Germany out of a belief that only it could seriously counter the rise of the Nazis. When Hitler came to power, at great danger to himself, he wrote newspaper articles about the full implications of Hitler's ideology, which he had seen up-close, but, apart from the communist Daily Worker, British newspapers were not interested in publishing them. In July 1933, threats by the Nazi step-father of a boy with whom he was having a liaison caused him to flee at short notice, and return to London. There, his continued involvement with communism, albeit brief and unenthusiastic, drew the attention of MI5, who kept an eye on him for the rest of his career. He spent the rest of his working life serving as a foreign correspondent for The Observer, The News Chronicle, The New York Times and other newspapers, drawing the ire of the British colonial authorities in Malaya and Cyprus for his revelations.

At age 26, Davidson met W. H. Auden, then 16, and they began a "poetic relationship". Davidson mentored Auden and was responsible for his poems first publication.

Davidson was open about his pederasty. His 1962 autobiography The World, the Flesh and Myself, described by Arthur Koestler in The Observer as one of the three best books of that year, begins: "This is the life-history of a lover of boys." His follow-up memoir Some Boys (1969) focused entirely on the boys he had met around the world, while working as a foreign correspondent. His last book, Sicilian Vespers, about Favignana, where he lived from 1966 to 1973, together with a selection of his personal correspondence and a brief biography, was posthumously published, following his death on 19 November 1975, aged 78, in Victoria, Malta.

== Published books ==
For a more complete list, see “A bibliography of Davidson’s writings” in Davidson's Sicilian Vespers listed below, pp. 357–60.

- The World, the Flesh and Myself. 1st edition, London: Arthur Barker, 1962. Four editions, 1966–97. Current edition, London: Arcadian Dreams, 2022.
- Some Boys. 1st edition, London: David Bruce & Watson, 1969. American and only unexpurgated edition, Kingston, New York: Oliver Layton, 1971; 2nd British edition, London: GMP, 1988.
- Sicilian Vespers and other writings. London: Arcadian Dreams, 2021.
