= Craig Stevens =

Craig Stevens may refer to:

- Craig Stevens (actor) (1918–2000), American actor
- Craig Stevens (presenter), British television and radio presenter
- Craig Stevens (swimmer) (born 1980), Australian swimmer
- Craig Stevens (American football) (born 1984), American football player
- Craig Stevens, Beverly Hills police officer who pleaded guilty to lying during the investigation of Anthony Pellicano
