= Craig Young =

Craig Young may refer to:

- Craig Young (rugby league) (born 1956), Australian rugby league footballer
- Craig Robert Young (born 1976), British actor and singer
- Craig Young (cricketer) (born 1990), Irish cricketer
- Craig Young (sailor), Australian sailor who participated in the 2011 Dragon World Championships
- Craig Young (American football) (born 2001), American football player
