= Craig Farmstead =

Historic farm in North Carolina, United States

- U.S. National Register of Historic Places
- Location within North Carolina Location within the United States
- Location: 118 Craigland Ln., Gastonia, North Carolina
- Coordinates: 35°10′50″N 81°6′26″W
- Area: 19.2 acres (7.8 ha)
- Built: c. 1852
- Built by: Stowe, Lawson Henderson
- Architectural style: Italianate, Single-pen log barn
- NRHP reference No.: 06000292
- Added to NRHP: April 19, 2006

Craig Farmstead is a historic home and farm located near Gastonia, Gaston County, North Carolina. The William Moore Craig House was built about 1852, and is a one-story, single pile, two-room hewn- and sawn-frame house. The William Newton Craig House was built in 1886, and is a two-story, single pile Italianate style frame dwelling. Also on the property are the contributing privy (c. 1900-1910), meat / well house (c. 1900-1910), frame barn (c. 1890-1910), rectangular log pen barn (c. 1852-1860), and corn crib (c. 1900-1910).

It was listed on the National Register of Historic Places in 2006.
