= Craig Cohen (broadcaster) =

- Born: 1972 (age 53–54)
- Occupation: Broadcast journalist
- Years active: c. 1990s–present
- Employer: Houston Public Media
- Known for: Host of Houston Matters

Craig Cohen (born 1972) is the host of the public radio program Houston Matters, launched by Houston Public Media in February 2013.

Cohen is a 20+ year veteran of broadcast journalism. He's spent the bulk of his career in public media, in roles ranging from programmer and manager, to talk show host, reporter, news director, and producer. He's interviewed politicians, industry leaders, authors, and newsmakers.

Cohen started his career as an intern at JOY-96 FM in St. Louis, Missouri, before graduating with a degree at the University of Missouri. He worked at KBIA and K102 throughout college hosting various programs. He also spent time as an intern at KMOX.

From 1995-2002, Cohen worked at WILL-FM, hosting the region's franchise show of Morning Edition. He rejoined the station in March of 2012 as News and Public Affairs Director, with additional duties hosting a local show, Focus, centered on local downstate Illinois news.

Cohen is a noted hockey fan, particularly the St. Louis Blues. He has expressed interest in becoming a play-by-play announcer for the sport. He is also active in the local Houston Improv theatre scene. In March 2025, Cohen hosted the ceremonies for the Houston Hockey Hall of Fame for Hockey Day in Houston. The event centered on the now-defunct Houston Aeros. Cohen has cited Dan Kelly, as inspiration for getting into radio.

Cohen humorously interviewed himself, citing himself as his second-favorite guest, behind an approximate 7500-way tie for first with all other guests.
