= Mrs. Edward B. Craig House =

Historic house in Tennessee, United States

- U.S. National Register of Historic Places
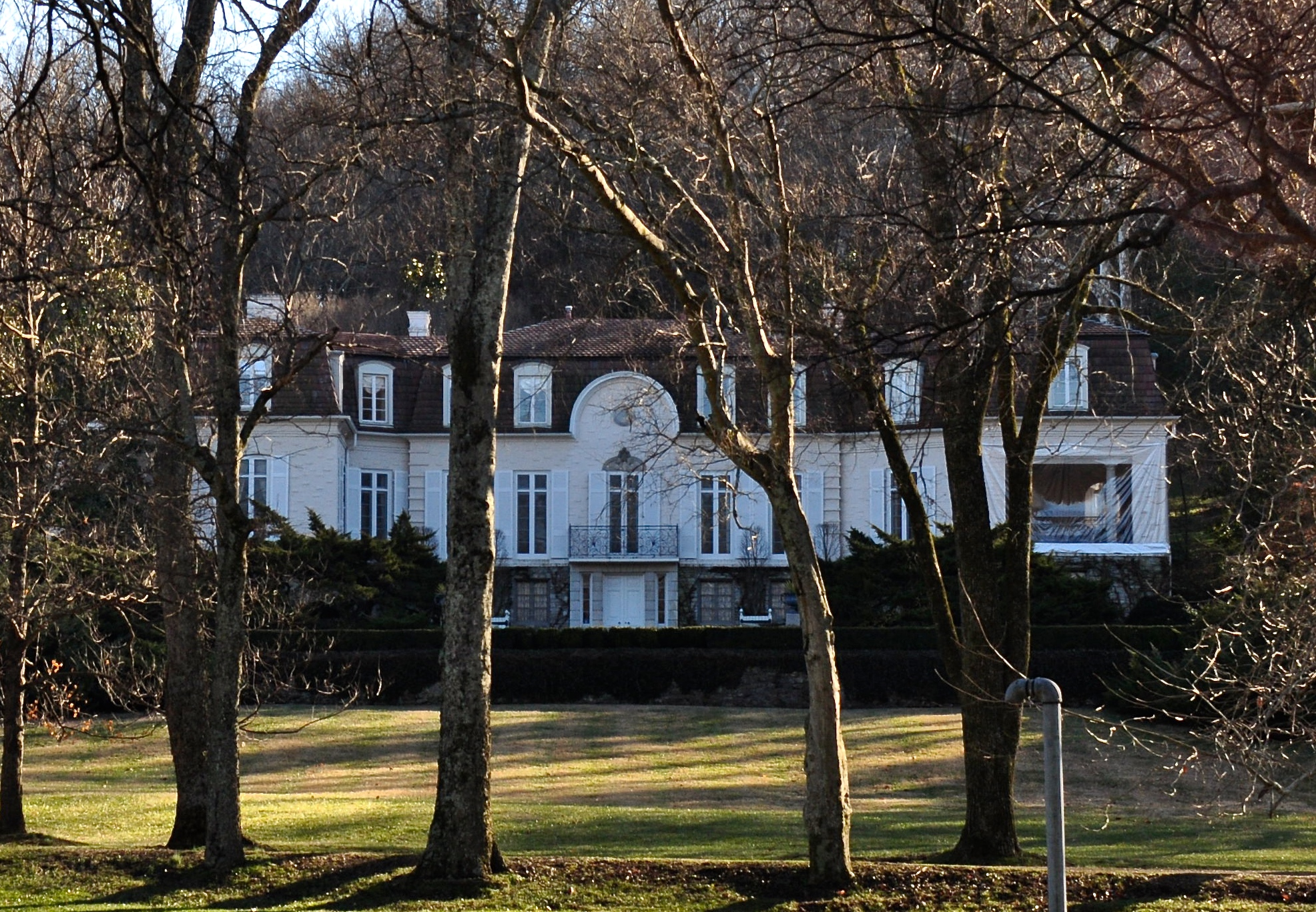
- The Mrs Edward B. Craig House in 2015

- Location within Tennessee Location within the United States
- Location: 1418 Chickering Rd., Forest Hills, Tennessee
- Coordinates: 36.071667°N 86.8675°W
- Area: 10.7 acres (4.3 ha)
- Built: 1935
- Architect: Herbert Rogers
- Architectural style: French Chateau
- MPS: Forest Hills, Tennessee MPS
- NRHP reference No.: 03001078
- Added to NRHP: October 27, 2003

The Mrs Edward B. Craig House is a historic mansion in Forest Hills, Tennessee, USA, a suburb of Nashville. The French-style mock castle on Chickering Road was completed in 1935. It was designed by A. Herbert Rogers, an interior designer popular in Nashville in the early twentieth century. (Note: Rogers was sued by the Tennessee State Board of Examiners for Architects and Engineers for actively engaging in the practice of architecture without a license.) Mrs. Craig was the widow of insurance executive Edwin B. Craig. Craig began as a banker in Tennessee and was appointed by president Grover Cleveland as internal revenue collector for middle Tennessee. In 1921 he joined National Life and Accident Insurance Company as vice president. His brother, Cornelius A. Craig was the company's president. The house, called "Belleforest", has been listed on the National Register of Historic Places since October 27, 2003.
