= Craig Hill (New York) =

Mountain in New York, United States

- Location within New York Location within the United States

Highest point
- Elevation: 2,661 feet (811 m)
- Coordinates: 42°13′14″N 74°51′03″W

Geography
- Location: Delhi, New York, U.S.
- Topo map: USGS Andes

Craig Hill is a mountain located in the Catskill Mountains of New York east-southeast of Delhi. Calhoun Hill is located east, Bryden Mountain is located north, and Scotch Mountain is located west-northwest of Craig Hill.
