= Craig Smith =

Craig Smith may refer to:

== Sports ==
- Craig Mackail-Smith (born 1984), footballer for Brighton & Hove Albion
- Craig Smith (1990s rugby league), Australian rugby league player
- Craig Smith (Australian rules footballer) (born 1967), former Australian rules footballer
- Craig Smith (basketball, born 1972) (born 1972), American basketball coach
- Craig Smith (basketball, born 1983) (born 1983), American basketball player
- Craig Smith (cricketer) (born 1985), New Zealand cricketer
- Craig Smith (ice hockey) (born 1989), American ice hockey player
- Craig Smith (rugby league, born 1971), New Zealand rugby league player
- Craig Smith (rugby league, born 1973), Australian rugby league player
- Craig Smith (rugby union) (born 1978), Scottish rugby union player for Edinburgh and Scotland

== Other ==
- Craig Smith (conductor) (1947–2007), American conductor
- Craig Smith (musician) (1945–2012), American musician and songwriter
- Craig S. Smith (born 1955), American journalist
- Craig T. Smith, former White House political director
- Craig Warren Smith (born 1946), expert on business and government relations in high tech industry
- Roger Craig Smith (born 1975), voice actor
