= Craig Kelly (disambiguation) =

Craig Kelly (born 1963) is an Australian politician.

Other people include:

- Craig Kelly (snowboarder) (1966–2003), American former snowboarder
- Craig Kelly (footballer) (born 1966), Australian former AFL footballer
- Craig Kelly (actor) (born 1970), British actor
- Craig A. Kelly (born 1953), American diplomat

== See also ==
- Kelly Craig, Canadian model and actress
