= Craig Roberts (disambiguation) =

Craig Roberts (born 1991) is a Welsh actor and director

Craig Roberts may also refer to:

- Craig Roberts (wrestler) (1968–2006), Canadian wrestler
- Craig G. Roberts (1930–2009), American horse trainer

== See also ==
- Craig Roberts Stapleton (born 1945), American diplomat and businessman
