= Craig Jones (cricketer) =

Australian cricketer

Craig Jones (born 13 April 1978 in Tamworth, New South Wales) was an Australian cricketer. He was a right-handed batsman and a right-arm medium-fast bowler who played for Middlesex in 2005.

Jones, who played one game as a 24-year-old for Middlesex CB, appeared in one game for the county side in 2005, a defeat against Cambridge UCCE. Jones picked up three wickets in the game, but did not bat, and was quickly out of the team.

He injured his back in a subsequent club game and did not return to competitive cricket for two years hence halting his cricket career.
