= Craig Foster (businessman) =

CEO of Clean Seas

Craig Foster is the CEO of Clean Seas, an ASX-listed Australian seafood company with interests in southern bluefin tuna and yellowtail kingfish farming. He was appointed to the position in 2012 after working in the salmon farming industry in Tasmania. There he managed research and development at the state's largest salmon hatchery and also worked as the Managing Director of fish feed producer, Gibsons Ltd. In 2001, he was working for Pivot, and assisting in the development of barramundi farms in the Northern Territory.

== Clean Seas ==
Foster was appointed as CEO of Clean Seas after fish mortalities during the period 2009-2012 severely limited their production of yellowtail kingfish.

In 2014, Clean Seas reported its first profitable year in seven years under Foster's leadership. Under Foster, the company was exploring potential to find a business partner with access to warmer ocean waters to grow out tuna fry. Clean Seas had successfully demonstrated their capacity to induce spawning and produce fry, but produced fry didn't survive direct transfer to the cool temperate waters off Port Lincoln. The southern bluefin tuna spawns naturally off Java in Indonesia, and as the fish grow, the fish migrate from tropical South-east Asia southwards into temperate Australian waters.

In 2017, Foster told The Lead that the company planned to grow their yellowtail kingfish farming business to produce and sell 1,500 tonnes annually, with the next milestone being 3,000 tonnes. He said that the company ultimately had enough capacity in its infrastructure and licenses to produce 8,000 tonnes but that the market would require "stimulating" and "building awareness" including targeting high-end restaurants and high-end retail in order to reach even the 3,000 tonne milestone.

=== Environmental impacts and government regulation ===
Foster has claimed that misconceptions exist regarding the environmental impact of aquaculture. He claims that the industry's effect on the environment is "very temporary" and that "if an aquaculture farm is here today and left tomorrow, within a year, you wouldn’t even know it existed." He has described government regulation of the sector as "quite enormous".
