= Craig Hill (rugby union) =

- Born: Craig Hill; 4 May 1982 (age 44) Cardiff, Wales
- Height: 185 cm (6 ft 1 in)
- Weight: 91 kg (14 st 5 lb; 201 lb)

Rugby union career
- Position: flanker
Senior career
Years	Team	Apps	(Points)
2009–12	Newport Gwent Dragons		
National sevens team
Years	Team		Comps
- Wales Sevens
Medal record
Men's rugby sevens
Representing Wales
Rugby World Cup Sevens
Gold medal – first place	2009 Dubai	Team competition

Craig Hill (born 4 May 1982) is a Welsh rugby union player. An openside flanker, he first played his senior rugby for Caerphilly aged 18, before joining Newport in 2002, and moving to Pontypridd RFC in 2003. He then played club rugby for Newport RFC after returning in 2005 and the Newport Gwent Dragons regional team. He made his debut for the Dragons 9 May 2009 against Edinburgh. He was released by Newport at the end of the 2011–12 season.

Hill made his Wales Sevens debut in 2008 at the Dubai leg of the IRB series and also represented the Wales national rugby sevens team in other IRB competitions throughout 2009, most notably winning the Sevens Rugby World Cup in Dubai, and also along the way to lifting the trophy scored the first hat trick of the competition in the opening game against Zimbabwe.
