= Craig Considine (sociologist) =

American writer (born 1985 or 1986)

Craig Michael Considine
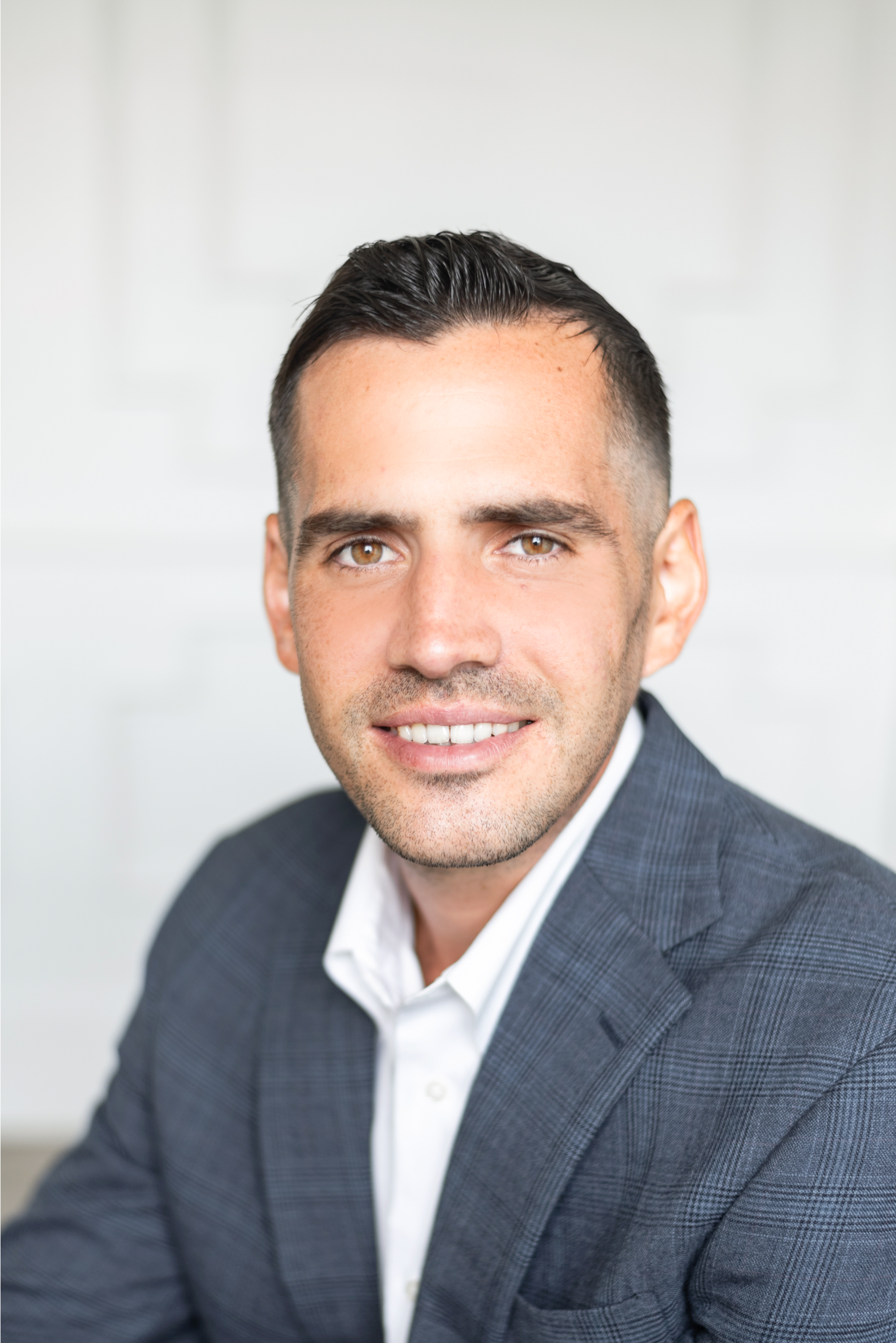
- Born: 1985 or 1986 (age 40–41); Needham, Massachusetts, United States
- Citizenship: American
- Education: Trinity College Dublin (PhD) Royal Holloway, University of London (MSc) American University (BA)
- Occupations: Christian commentator, scholar and author on Islam
- Website: https://drcraigconsidine.com

Craig Michael Considine is an American sociologist, an author, and a senior lecturer in sociology at Rice University. Considine has written books on Christian–Muslim relations.

== Life and career ==
Considine is an American of English, Scottish, Italian, and Irish descent.

He attended high school in Needham, Massachusetts. He later attended Trinity College Dublin, Ireland, graduating in 2015 with a PhD in sociology. His PhD thesis focused on young Pakistani men in Dublin and Boston. This thesis formed the basis of his 2017 book - Islam, Race, and Pluralism in the Pakistani Diaspora (Routledge, 2017) – on the same topic.

Considine is a lecturer in the Department of Sociology at Rice University. In 2020, he received an internal teaching award from the university. His teaching philosophy is focused on "self-directed, active learning".

In 2024, during an interview with Middle East Forum (a right-wing anti-Islam think tank), Considine stated that "Western academia" has "gone too far left", alleging that universities harbor "experts teaching the youth to hate their country" and thereby committing "civilizational suicide". Considine describes "decolonization, critical race theory, social justice" as left-wing "buzz phrases". Considine suggested that he had been previously "duped" by "left-leaning, liberal-talking points".

== Selected works and reception ==
=== People of the Book - Prophet Muhammad's Encounters with Christians (2021) ===
In 2021, Considine published a book concerning the Prophet Muhammad's relationship to Christianity. Samuel Sweeney reviewed the book in The Wall Street Journal, stressing that "Considine misunderstands the role of ’asabiyya as Ibn Khaldun meant it", summarising the book as making "dubious claims about ideas that emerge from Islamic history", and suggesting that "It is hard to imagine a more pained attempt to project modern values onto a medieval concept". Charles Tieszen provided a similarly negative review of the book in the journal of Islam and Christian-Muslim Relations. Tieszen stated that "readers who hope to use the book as a scholarly overview, whether for historical scholarship or in the classroom, will be inevitably dissatisfied and perhaps even at times disappointed", and describing the book as "not a scholarly engagement" but instead a text that "neglects historiography and literary contextualization". Tieszen noted that Considine is "keen to contextualize and problematize Qur’anic passages when it suits him but is entirely uninterested in doing so with other sources when such analysis could weaken or obscure his argument".

=== The Humanity of Muhammad - A Christian View (2020) ===
In 2020, Blue Dome Press published a book concerning Prophet Muhammad's relationship to humanity. Abdur Raheem Kidwai of Aligarh Muslim University reviewed the book in The Muslim World Book Review, stating that it "surpasses some of the finest attributes to the Prophet (blessings and peace be upon him) paid earlier by few Western writers down the ages". Muhammad Misbah and Anisah Setyaningrum wrote in The Downside Review that the book was "created to promote greater understanding and peace between Christians and Muslims". Omar Ahmed of the Middle East Monitor said that The Humanity of Muhammad is "clearly a heartfelt and very personal perspective from a writer who is an advocate of interfaith dialogue and acknowledges his admiration for the Prophet".

=== Journey into America (documentary) (2009) ===
Considine directed "Journey into America", an amateur documentary following Akbar Ahmed and a group of young researchers addressing Muslim experiences in America. Neither Rotten Tomatoes nor IMDb records any reviews by professional critics or audience members. A review in Anthropology Today described the documentary as "a combination of morality tale and road movie", summarizing that it is "intricately composed" although "inconveniently long". The only platform where the documentary is available is YouTube where, as of June 2024, it has received 3,800 views.

== Works ==
=== Books ===
- Beyond Dialogue - Building Bonds Between Christians and Muslims. 2024. Polity Press. ISBN 978-1-5095-5526-0
- People of the Book: Prophet Muhammad’s Encounters with Christians. 2021. Hurst Publishers and Oxford University Press. ISBN 978-1-78738-471-2
- The Humanity of Muhammad: A Christian View. 2020. Blue Dome Press. ISBN 978-1-68206-529-7
- Islam in America: Exploring the Issues. 2019. Bloomsbury. ISBN 978-1-4408-6631-9
- Muhammad Nabi Cinta - Catatan Seorang Nasrani Tentang Rasulullah Saw. 2018. Mizan.
- Muslims in America: Examining the Facts. 2018. Bloomsbury. ISBN 978-1-4408-6054-6
- Islam, Race, and Pluralism in the Pakistani Diaspora. 2017. Routledge. ISBN 978-1-315-46275-2

=== Journal articles ===
- Young Pakistani Men and Irish Identity - Religion, Race, and Ethnicity in Post-Celtic Tiger Ireland. 2018. Sociology.
- Religious Pluralism and Civic Rights in a “Muslim Nation”: An Analysis of Prophet Muhammad’s Covenants with Christians. 2016. Religions (MDPI).

=== Documentary ===
- Journey Into America. 2009 (documentary).
