= Craig Michael Wheeler =

American politician

Member of the New Hampshire House of Representatives from the Nashua 29th district
- In office 1995-1996

Personal details
- Party: Democratic

Craig Michael Wheeler is a Democratic former member of the New Hampshire House of Representatives, representing the Nashua 29th district in 1995 and 1996. He was elected for one term in 1994, with 462 votes, coming in second after David Cote. He served on the Environment & Agriculture and State-Federal Relations committees.
