= Craig Spence (archaeology) =

British archaeologist

Craig Spence is an historian and archaeologist. He is senior lecturer at Bishop Grosseteste University in Lincoln, Lincolnshire.

== Publications ==
- Spence, C. (1990) The Museum of London Archaeological site manual, 2nd edition. Museum of London Archaeology Service.
- Spence, C. (2000) London in the 1690s: a social atlas. London: CMH, Institute of Historical Research. ISBN 9781871348576
- Spence, C. (2012/2014). Lincoln: a history and celebration. Salisbury: Frith Book Company.
- Spence, C. (2016). Accidents and violent death in early modern London 1650–1750. Woodbridge: Boydell & Brewer.
