= Craig Hospital =

Coordinates: 39.6541°N 104.9782°W

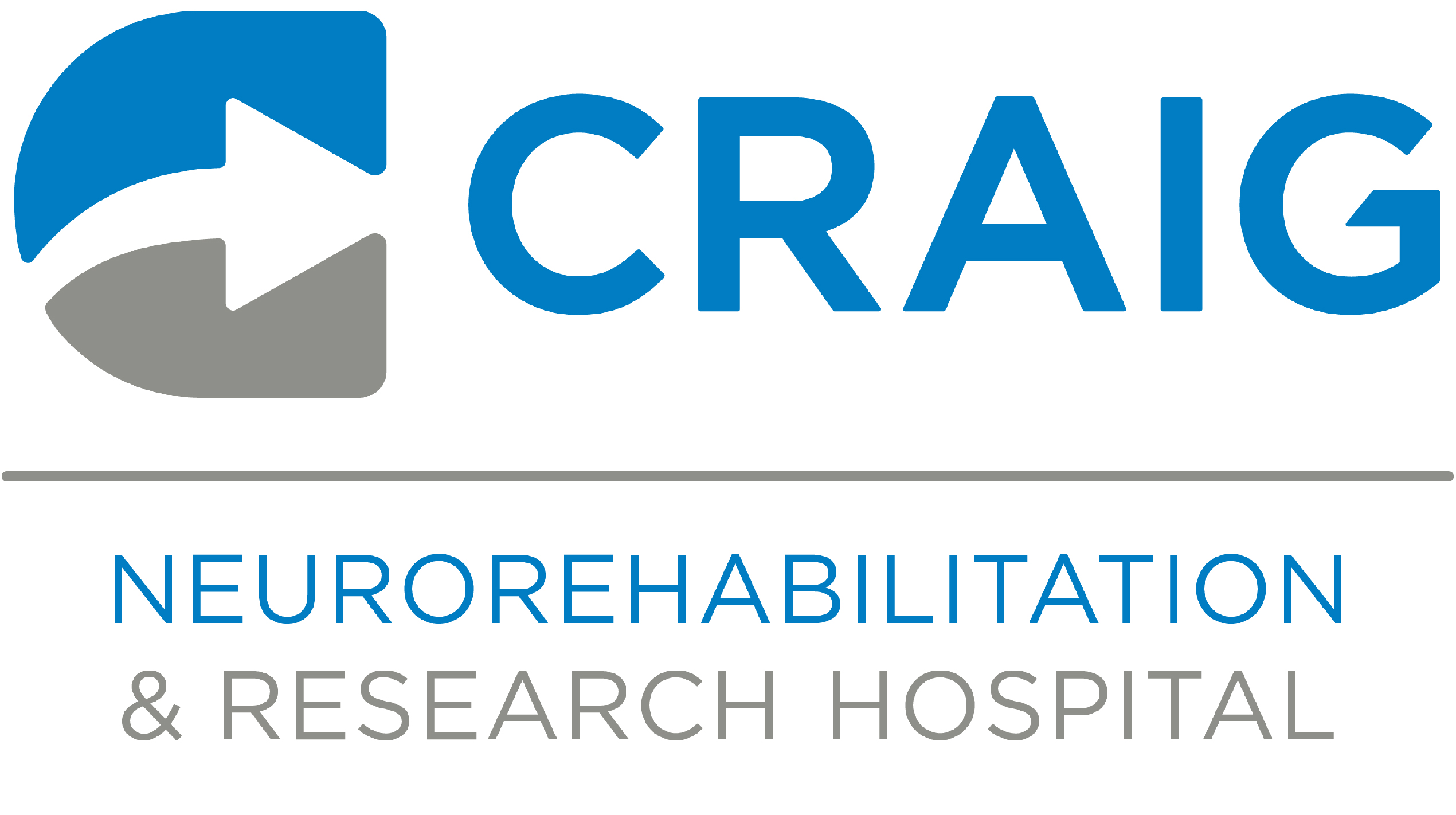

Geography
- Location: 3425 S. Clarkson Street, Englewood, Colorado, United States

Organization
- Care system: Free-Standing; Not-For-Profit
- Type: Specialist

Services
- Emergency department: N/A
- Beds: 93
- Specialty: Spinal cord injury, traumatic brain injury, neurorehabilitation

History
- Former name: Craig Rehabilitation Hospital
- Founded: 1907; 119 years ago

Links
- Website: craighospital.org
- Lists: Hospitals in Colorado

Craig Hospital is a neurorehabilitation and research hospital in the western United States, specializing in spinal cord injury (SCI) and traumatic brain injury (TBI) rehabilitation and research. Located just south of Denver in Englewood, Colorado, Craig is a 93-bed, private, not-for-profit, free-standing long-term acute care and rehabilitation hospital that provides inpatient and outpatient medical care, rehabilitation, neurosurgical rehabilitative care, and long-term follow-up services.

Half of Craig's patients come from outside of Colorado each year, and in the past four years Craig has treated patients from all 50 states and several foreign countries. At any given time, the staff at Craig treats approximately 55 inpatients with spinal cord injuries, 30 with traumatic brain injuries, and 50-60 outpatients. Craig provides housing for out-of-state families and outpatients, including the first 30 days free for families of new inpatients.

Craig Hospital is designated by the National Institute on Disability Rehabilitation and Research (NIDRR) as a Model System Center for both spinal cord injury and traumatic brain injury. Craig is also the NIDRR National Statistical TBI database for the other 15 Model System Centers in the U.S.

== History ==
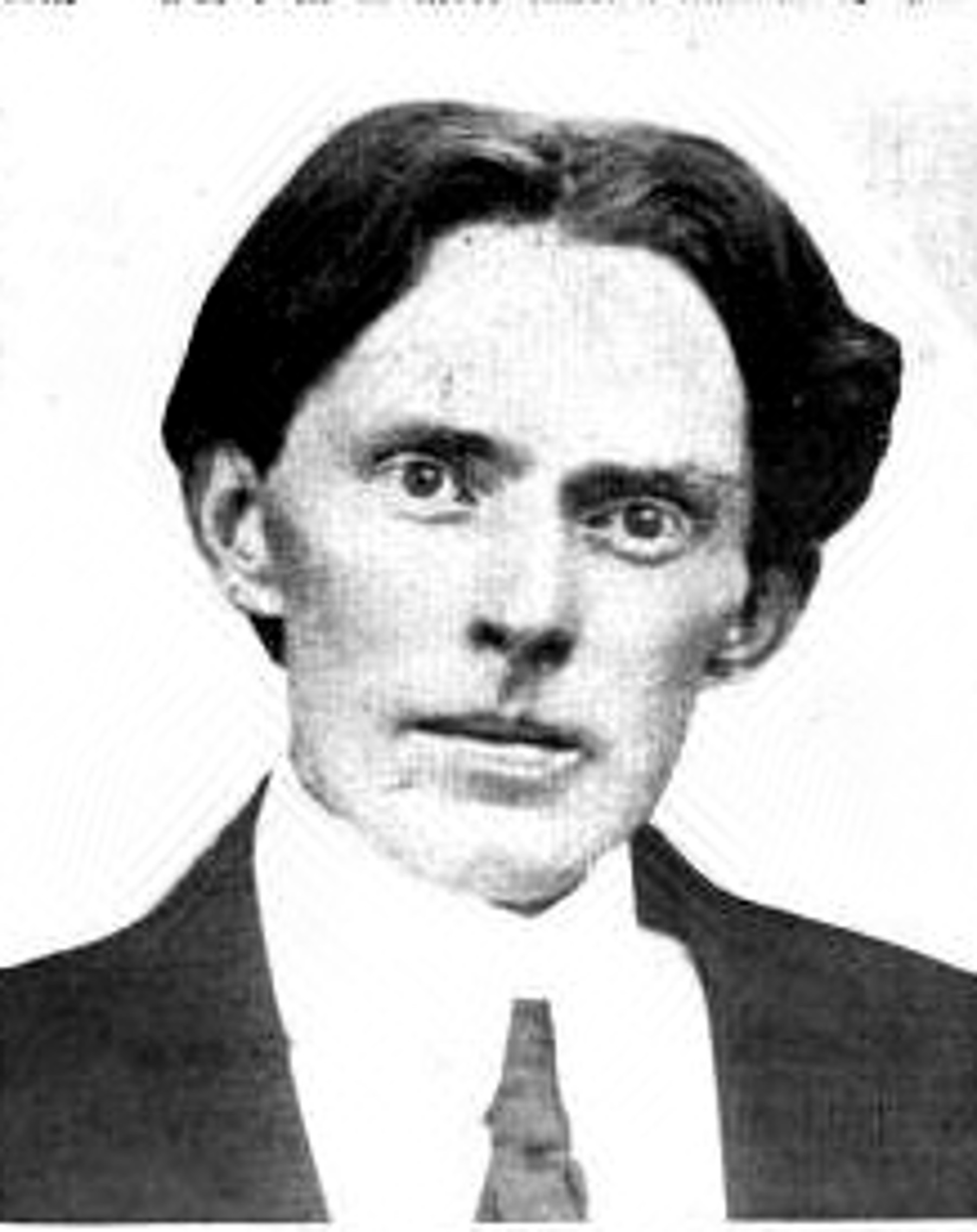
Frank Craig

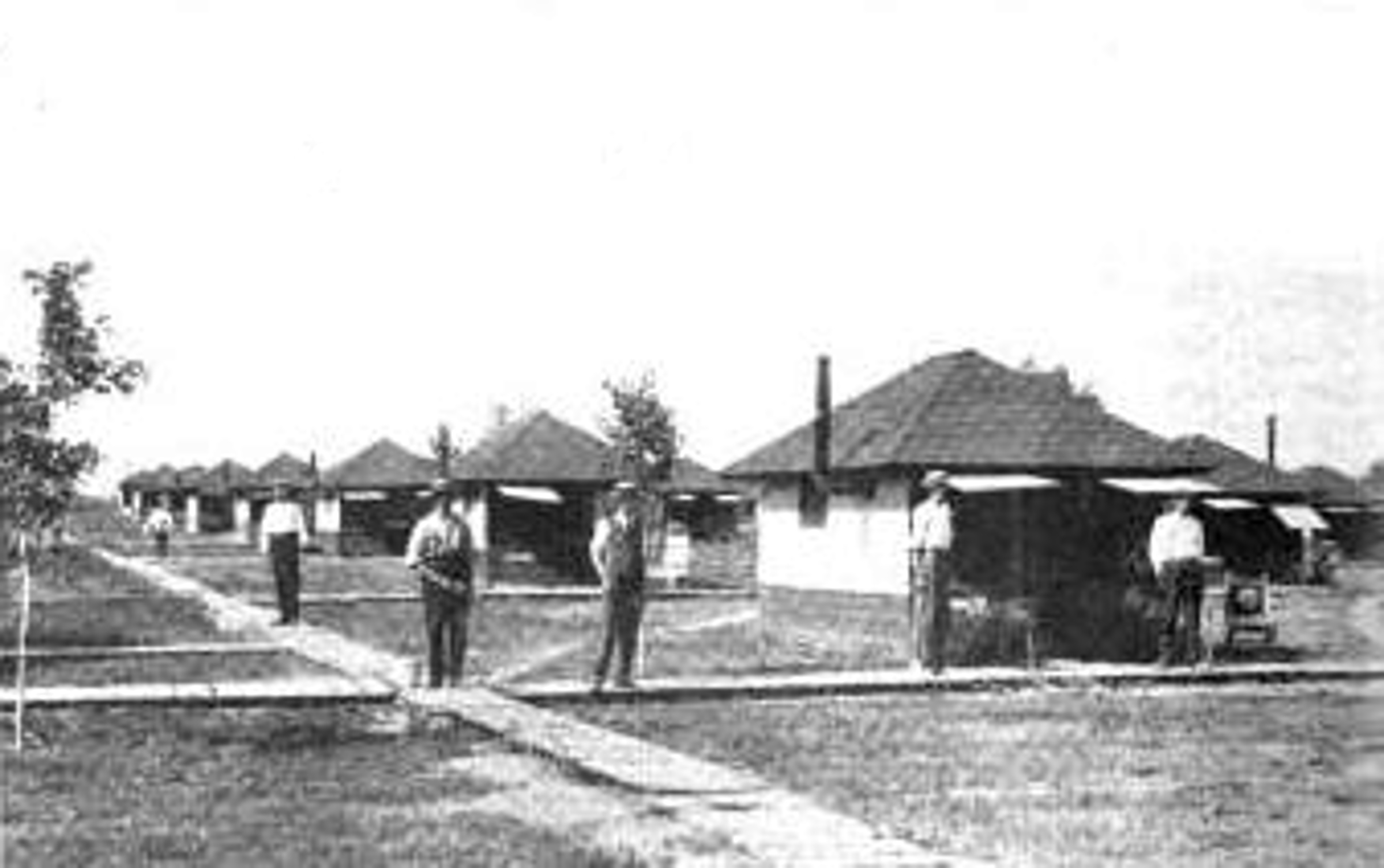
Craig Colony in 1920

In 1907, Frank Craig started the Tent Colony of Brotherly Love in Lakewood, Colorado to treat indigent men with tuberculosis. Craig himself died from tuberculosis in 1914 and the tent colony was renamed Craig Colony in his memory in 1919.

As the demand for tuberculosis treatment waned in the United States, Craig Colony began focusing on the diagnoses and treatment of multiple sclerosis, polio, muscular dystrophy, and spinal cord injury (SCI). The facility is renamed Craig Rehabilitation Center in 1958, followed by another renaming to Craig Rehabilitation Hospital in 1966 and a move to Englewood, Colorado in 1970 where an 80-bed rehabilitation hospital was built adjacent to the Swedish Medical Center to share ancillary services.

The 1970s brought a change to the facility's current name, Craig Hospital, in 1975 and the establishment of a separate traumatic brain injury team. Research and building construction were seen throughout the next two decades, including an increase of beds from 80 to 93.

== Research ==
The Craig Hospital Research Department currently has a staff of 23 with an annual budget of $4 million in federal, state, foundation, and industry-sponsored grants devoted to conducting a wide variety of applied spinal cord injury (SCI) and traumatic brain injury (TBI) rehabilitation research. In addition, funds raised from the annual PUSH Dinner support more basic research.

The Research Department was established in 1974 when Craig Hospital was first awarded a Spinal Cord Injury Model System grant from the US Department of Education, National Institute on Disability and Rehabilitation Research (NIDRR). In 1998, Craig's brain injury program received a similar designation when it was first named a TBI Model System. Each Model System project consists of a three-pronged research effort: contributing to a national longitudinal database, conducting local research projects that are of interest and importance to Craig, and collaborating with other Model Systems in research of common interest.

In 2006, Craig was named the TBI Model Systems National Data and Statistical Center, managing the TBI National Database and coordinating research among all TBI Model Systems.

Craig currently receives research funding not only from NIDRR, but also from the Centers for Disease Control and Prevention (CDC), the Colorado TBI Trust Fund, the Congressionally Directed Medical Research Program (CDMRP) which is part of the Department of Defense, other researchers via subcontracts, and pharmaceutical and medical equipment companies. As research has become more important to the mission and reputation of Craig, the Research Department has increased collaboration with other institutions by leading and participating in multi-center research and becoming a national research coordinating center.

== Campus Revitalization and Expansion Project ==
In 2016, Craig completed a $90 million, three-year construction and expansion project that added 85,000 square feet of new space and renovated 135,000 square feet of existing space.

== Notable patients ==
- Columbine High School massacre victims – Four of the students injured in the 1999 attack received treatment at Craig.
- George Congrave – University of Denver hockey player suffered a brain injury during a game in 1958.
- Roy Horn – Part of Siegfried and Roy lion and tiger entertainment act was injured when attacked by a tiger during a stage show in 2003.
- Jason Dorwart – Assistant Professor of Global Theatre Studies at Hong Kong Baptist University, previously at Oberlin College, actor and former board Vice-Chairperson of PHAMALY theater group
- Trish Downing – Competitive cyclist suffered a spinal cord injury in 2000.
- Regan Linton – Actor and member of PHAMALY theater group.
- Tara Llanes – Professional mountain bike racer. Suffered spinal cord injury in 2007.
- Steven McDonald – New York City police officer shot and paralyzed in the line of duty in 1986.
- Stephen Murray – BMX dirt rider paralyzed attempting a double back flip at the Dew Action Sports Tour BMX Dirt Finals in Baltimore, Maryland in 2007.
- Kevin Pearce – Professional snowboarder, suffered traumatic brain injury during training run in December 2009.
- Victoria L. Popdan-American author, suffered spinal cord injury, car accident, 1991 (age 17). Alice_Redux, Electric Grace
- Jason Regier – Captain of the Denver Harlequins, Quadriplegic rugby team (Wheelchair Rugby), Member, 2008 Quad Rugby Paralympic American Team, Suffered spinal cord injury in car accident in 1996.
- Willie Shoemaker – American jockey. Suffered spinal cord injury in 1991.
- Randy Snow - Three-time Paralympian medalist, first Paralympian to be inducted into the U.S. Olympic Hall of Fame. Suffered spinal cord injury at age 16 in 1975.
- Chance Sumner – Member of Denver Harlequins, Quadriplegic rugby team (Wheelchair Rugby), Member of 2008 Quad Rugby Paralympic American team. Suffered a spinal cord injury in 2002 when he was thrown off a mechanical bull.
- Herb Tabak – Author and pilot
- Tommy Urbanski – Former professional wrestler, suffered spinal cord injury after shooting incident in Las Vegas with pro football playerPacman Jones in February 2009.
- Mike Utley – American football player, paralyzed while playing for the Detroit Lions during a game against the Los Angeles Rams in 1991.
- Doak Walker – American football player and former Heisman Trophy winner, suffered spinal cord injury while skiing in 1998.
- George Wallace – Former Governor of Alabama, shot and paralyzed in assassination attempt while campaigning for President of the United States in 1972.
- Robert Wickens -Race Car Driver, injured at Pocono Raceway in a 2018 INDYCAR race
