= Craig J. Spence =

American journalist and lobbyist

Craig J. Spence (October 25, 1940 – November 10, 1989) was an American journalist, a Republican lobbyist, socialite and child sex trafficker who committed suicide in 1989 in the wake of a Washington Times exposé reporting on his involvement in a prostitution ring and in blackmail.

== Background ==
Spence attended Syracuse University and began his journalism career working for WCBS in New York City. He would eventually become a correspondent for ABC News. During the Vietnam War, he covered Southeast Asia, but in 1969 he was banned by the government from reporting in Vietnam after which ABC relocated him to Tokyo. There he also found work as a freelance reporter and as a stringer for Britain's Daily Mail. Spence spent about a decade in Tokyo during which he made prominent connections at a time of great economic growth. He began doing public relations consulting for the government-supported Japan External Trade Organization and Japanese corporations.

Spence arrived in Washington D.C. in the late 70s and soon become a fixture of Washington high society leading to a 1982 feature in the New York Times which remarked that Spence's "personal phone book and party guest lists constitute a Who's Who in Congress, Government and journalism." Guests at Spence's lavish parties were known to include William Safire, John N. Mitchell, Phyllis Schlafly, James Lilley, Alfred M. Gray, Joseph diGenova, and Roy Cohn.

In January 1985, Spence registered with the U.S. State Department as a foreign agent for Japan and began lobbying for Japanese interests. Throughout the 1980s, Spence built a reputation as an influential lobbyist who represented many Japanese concerns and established close friendships with a number of leading Japanese politicians, including Motoo Shiina, considered by Tokyo analysts to be an inside favorite to replace scandal-plagued Sōsuke Uno as prime minister.

Spence was close friends with journalist Liz Trotta, who wrote extensively about Spence in her memoirs. The two met in 1966 at Leonard Bernstein's home and the two later found themselves working as war correspondents during the Vietnam War. Trotta later recalled the various personalities she would see at his Washington D.C. parties including Ted Koppel, William Casey, and Eric Sevareid. Trotta also recalled going on one of Spence's midnight tours of the White House, which would later gain extensive media coverage.

== Vinson prostitution ring ==
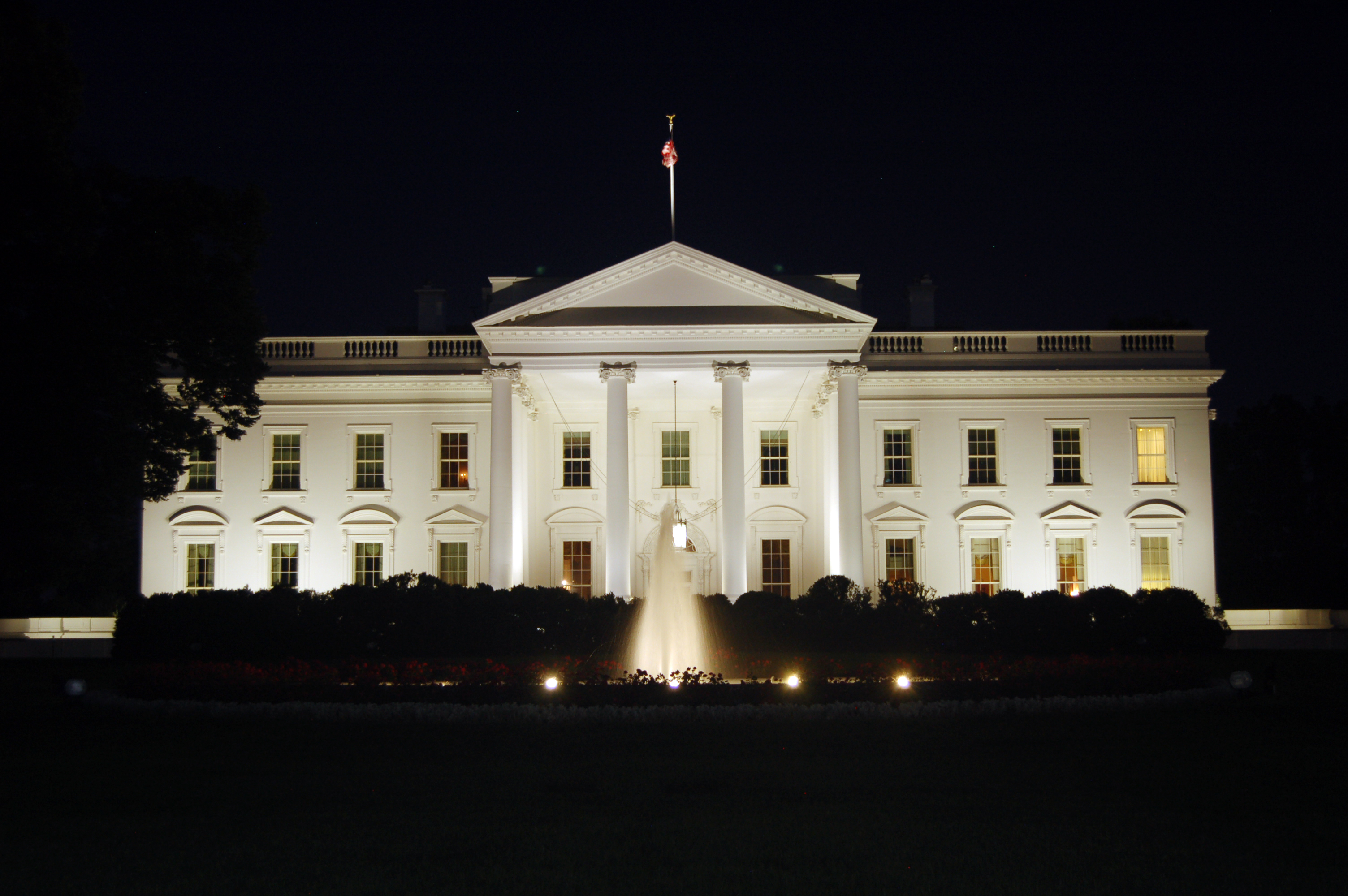
Spence gained public notoriety for arranging midnight tours of the White House for guests which included male prostitutes.

Spence's name came to national prominence in the aftermath of a June 29, 1989, front-page headline article in The Washington Times identifying Spence as a major customer of a homosexual escort service which had been raided in February and was now under investigation by the Secret Service, the District of Columbia Police and the United States Attorney's Office for suspected credit card fraud. The ring was being operated by a man named Henry Vinson who had been using a funeral parlor to launder the money being made. Clients included "key officials of the Reagan and Bush administrations" and Spence was mentioned by name. The newspaper said he spent as much as $20,000 a month on the service.

Spence had also been linked to a White House guard named Reginald deGueldre, who allowed Spence and his friends to take late-night White House tours. Among the guests in Spence's midnight tours of the White House were two male prostitutes. A White House probe regarding the tours led the Secret Service to furlough three guards, but it was also publicly stated that the First Family's security was never threatened, and it was explained that security guards were allowed to give private tours. President George H. W. Bush was made aware of the scandal.

A follow-up article featured reports from Spence's friends and guests indicating that Spence's home was wired up with extensive surveillance equipment and that he would attempt to entice guests into sexual encounters with prostitutes to use as blackmail. One male soldier reported that he had been enticed into an encounter with a female prostitute by Spence, who then used photos of the tryst in order to blackmail him into "beating up a couple of guys". When the soldier afterwards refused to have sex with Spence, Spence showed the pictures to the soldier's wife, leading to the couple's separation.

Spence entered a downward spiral in the wake of the exposé, increasingly involving himself with call boys and crack. He disappeared briefly, evading government agents who wanted to subpoena him to testify about the Vinson prostitution ring. Spence made headlines again after his arrest on July 31, 1989, at the Barbizon Hotel on East 63rd Street in Manhattan for criminal possession of a firearm and criminal possession of cocaine.

In August, 1989 during an eight-hour interview with the Washington Times, Spence denied that deGueldre alone had cleared the White House tours and explained that the guard had only served as a guide. The reporters, Michael Hedges and Jerry Seper would write that "Mr. Spence hinted the tours were arranged by 'top level' persons", including Donald Gregg, national security adviser to Bush, then vice president, at the time the tours were given. When pressed to identify who it was who got him inside the White House, Spence asked "Who was it who got [long-term CIA operative] Félix Rodríguez in to see Bush?", indicating that he was alluding to Gregg. Gregg himself dismissed the allegation as "absolute bull", according to Hedges and Seper. "It disturbs me that he can reach a slimy hand out of the sewer to grab me by the ankle like this," he told the reporters. "The allegations are totally false."

During the same interview Spence claimed that the surveillance equipment at his home had been set up by "friendly" intelligence agents. Rumors of Craig's ties to the CIA dated back to his Vietnam correspondent days, and the CIA was also speculated to be one of the sources of his wealth by his acquaintances.

=== Interactions with Vinson and Ebony and Ivory Brothel ===
A year after Henry W. Vinson's acquisition of Ebony and Ivory, an escort business operating out of Washington, D.C., he had been phoned by Spence, who disclosed that he was a lobbyist who lived in D.C.'s upscale neighborhood Kalorama. Spence requested an escort who was "young, boyish, and between 18 to 19 years old". Two hours after this exchange, Spence requested another escort.

Following this exchange, Spence became a regular and would often phone daily for escorts, which amassed to spending over $20,000 a month. Many of the escorts working for Vinson mentioned orgies occurring during these sessions with Spence.

On one of the occasions in which Vinson had been invited to Spence's home, where Lawrence King was also present, King spoke of his and Spence's endeavors in operating a pedophile network that flew children from coast to coast as well as murdering children. During this visit, Spence had also shown Vinson a two-way mirror that had a video camera on a tripod pointed towards the living room. Spence proceeded to tell Vinson that his home was "bugged for clandestine surveillance" and that "CIA operatives" had installed the video cameras throughout his house. Following this experience, Spence threatened Vinson about the "consequences" if he was to speak about the equipment.

On a following visit where both King and Spence were present, they attempted to coerce Vinson into ensnaring children for them. Following this visit, Vinson decided to stop providing Spence with escort services and processing Spence's friend Tony's credit cards.

Spence also mentioned sending escorts working for Ebony and Ivory to the White House for late night tours. Vinson asked the escort in question who was sent regarding this visit, and he confirmed he had visited the White House under Spence's command in the late night hours and that Secret Service personnel had waved him through the gate. In follow-up visits with escorts who had serviced Spence, they mentioned that minors were also present at Spence's parties.

Paul Bonacci, who was a Franklin scandal victim-witness, also told investigators that he was brought to Washington, D.C., for a private White House tour facilitated by Craig Spence for young male prostitutes.

=== Credit card fraud ===
At some point, a man named Tony started to phone Ebony and Ivory. Tony claimed he was a friend of Spence.

On one visit, Tony claimed that he had also run a gay escort service and had worked closely with Spence. During this visit, Tony asked Vinson if he could process credit cards, which Vinson had followed up with through his mother's ambulance company.

In a follow-up visit with Tony, Tony mentioned a credit card processing company operating out of Florida and that his friend who worked for the company would help him set up the process with a merchant account. This led to Vinson processing credit cards weekly for Tony.

== Death ==
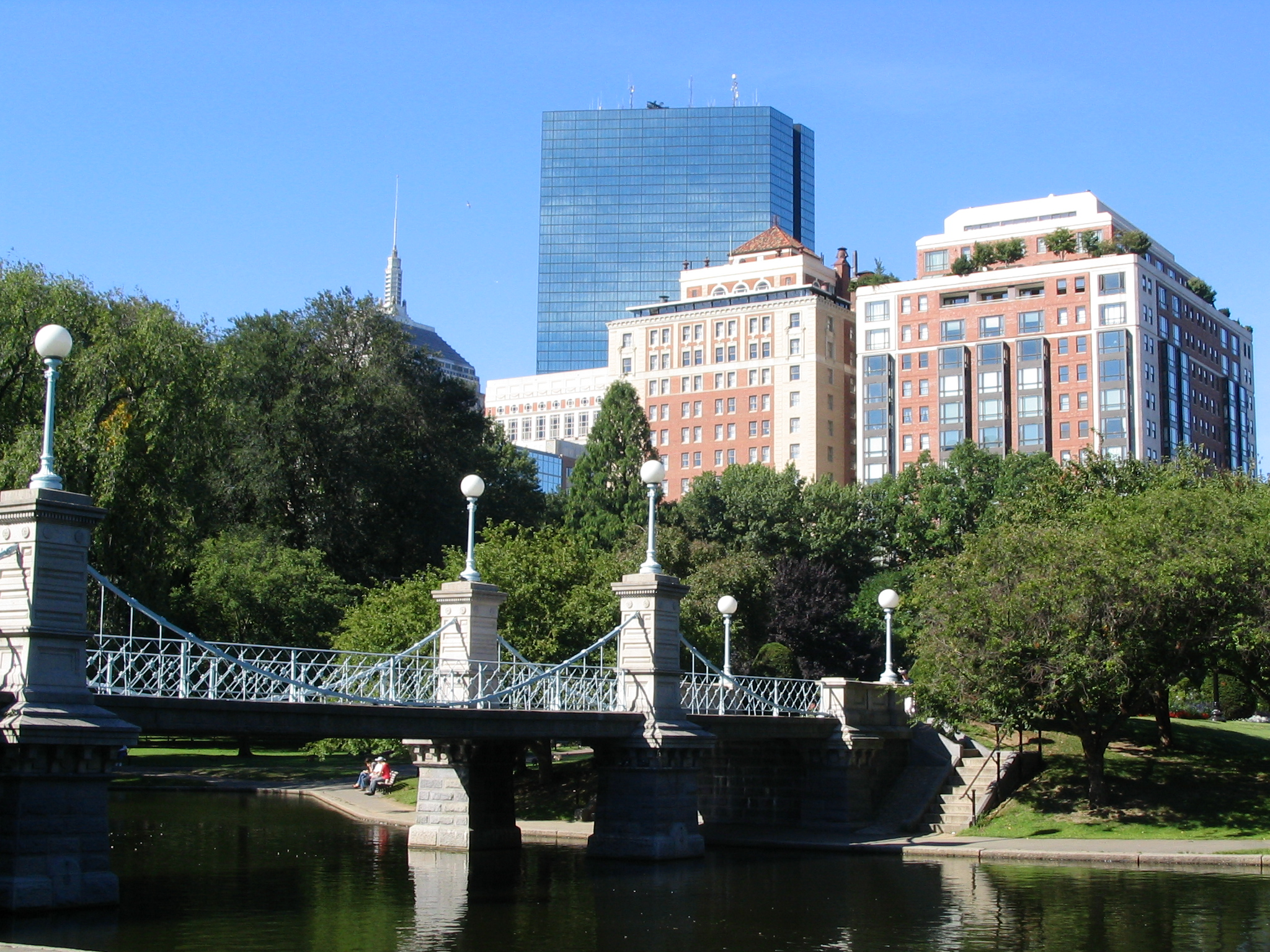
The Boston Ritz Carlton (now known as the Newbury Boston), where Spence committed suicide by overdose.

On November 10, 1989, Spence was found dead and barricaded in Room 429 of the Boston Ritz Carlton, the city's most expensive hotel. He was dressed in a tuxedo and had three dollars in his pocket. According to the police report, when found by hotel employees he was attired in the style he affected at his lavish dinner parties: "black Tux with white shirt, bow tie, white suspenders, black socks and shoes", with a telephone cradled in his ear and a Walkman headset containing a cassette tape of Mozart's "A Little Night Music". Next to his body was a newspaper clipping about efforts to protect CIA agents from testifying before government agencies. His death would later be ruled a suicide from ingesting alcohol and anti-depressants.

Found hidden in a false ceiling in the bathroom were seven small packets of Xanax, a prescription anti-anxiety drug, with one pill removed. In black felt-tip marker he had written on a mirror of his room:

Chief, consider this my resignation, effective immediately. As you always said, you can't ask others to make a sacrifice if you are not ready to do the same. Life is duty. God bless America.

As a postscript, he wrote, "To the Ritz, please forgive this inconvenience."

During the lengthy August interview with Michael Hedges and Jerry Seper which had taken place at a Liz Trotta's Manhattan apartment a few months before his death, Spence alluded to more intricate involvements. "All this stuff you've uncovered, to be honest with you, is insignificant compared to other things I've done. But I'm not going to tell you those things, and somehow the world will carry on." Shortly before that in a phone call with Trotta, during which she had urged Spence to turn himself in to the authorities who wanted him for questioning, he had also retorted that they wouldn't be able to "solve the big thing".

== Cited works ==
- Vinson, Henry (2015). Confessions of a D.C. Madam: The Politics of Sex, Lies, and Blackmail. Trine Day. ISBN 978-1937584290.
- Trotta, Liz (1991). Fighting for Air: In the Trenches with Television News. University of Missouri. ISBN 0826209521.
- DeCamp, John (1996). The Franklin Cover-Up. AWT. ISBN 9780963215802.
