= Douglas baronets of Glenbervie (second creation, 1831) =

Extinct baronetcy

Escutcheon of the Douglas baronets of Glenbervie

The Douglas baronetcy of Glenbervie, Kincardine, Aberdeenshire was created on 30 September 1831 in the Baronetage of the United Kingdom for the army officer Kenneth MacKenzie, as the second creation. He shortly changed his surname to Douglas.

== Douglas of Glenbervie (1831) ==
- Sir Kenneth Mackenzie Douglas, 1st Baronet (died 22 November 1833)
- Sir Robert Andrews Douglas, 2nd Baronet (1807 – 1 November 1843)
- Sir Robert Andrews Mackenzie Douglas, 3rd Baronet (19 July 1837 – 28 February 1884), MP for Marsden (1876–1879)
- Sir Kenneth Douglas, 4th Baronet (29 May 1868 – 28 October 1954)
- Sir Sholto Courtenay Mackenzie Douglas, 5th Baronet (27 June 1890 – 9 June 1986). He left no heir, and the title became extinct on his death.

== See also ==
- Douglas baronets of Glenbervie (first creation, 1625)

== Notes ==
Baronetage of the United Kingdom
Preceded by Clarke baronets	Douglas baronets of Glenbervie; 30 September 1831	Succeeded by Foster baronets
