= Shorncliffe =

Shorncliffe can refer to:

- Shorncliffe, Queensland, a suburb of Brisbane in Australia
  - Shorncliffe railway line, to the suburb
  - Shorncliffe railway station, Brisbane, in the suburb
- Shorncliffe, Kent, a district of Folkestone, Kent, England, home to an army camp
  - Shorncliffe Army Camp, a military establishment
  - Shorncliffe Redoubt, a British Napoleonic earthwork fort in Kent
