= Shorncliffe Camp =

Shorncliffe Camp may refer to:

- Shorncliffe Redoubt – a British Napoleonic earthwork fort
- Shorncliffe Army Camp – a large military establishment in Cheriton, Kent, UK
- Folkestone West railway station – a British railway station opened in 1863 as "Shorncliffe Camp"
