= Light Bobs =

Light Bobs may refer to:

- British light infantry; see History of British light infantry
- 52nd (Oxfordshire) Regiment of Foot
