= Robert Douglas (New Zealand politician) =

New Zealand politician

Sir Robert Douglas Bt

Member of the New Zealand Parliament for Marsden
- In office 1876–1879
- Preceded by: John Munro
- Succeeded by: William Henry Colbeck

Personal details
- Born: Robert Andrew Mackenzie Douglas; 19 July 1837
- Died: 28 February 1884 (aged 46)
- Party: Independent

Sir Robert Andrews Mackenzie Douglas, 3rd Baronet (19 July 1837 – 28 February 1884) was a Member of Parliament for Marsden in Northland, New Zealand.

== Biography ==
New Zealand Parliament
| Years | Term | Electorate | Party |
|---|---|---|---|
| 1876–1879 | 6th | Marsden | Independent |

Douglas was born in 1837, the eldest son of Sir Robert Andrews Douglas, 2nd Baronet of Douglas of Glenbervie. His grandfather, the 1st Baronet, was Kenneth Douglas, born Kenneth MacKenzie. The 3rd Baronet was educated at first in Jersey and completed his studies in Hampshire. He was gazetted into the 57th Regiment in 1854 and very quickly was on active service in the Crimean War. He was present at the storming of Sebastopol, and the capture of Kinburn, receiving the Crimean medal and clasp, and the Turkish War medal. He next served against the Arabs at Aden, and was present at the capture at Sheikothman. He then took part in the suppression of the Indian mutiny. The 57th were afterwards dispatched to New Zealand, and Sir Robert was present at various skirmishes, and at Nukumaru, receiving the honour of mention in general orders. For ten years he commanded a company of the old 'Die Hards', and the retired by sale of commission, and settled in Whangārei.

On 31 March 1866, he married Eleanor Louisa Smith, the daughter of Thomas Huntley Liffiton. She had previously married Frederick Smith, a soldier serving with the 65th Regiment of Foot, at Wanganui in 1859, but was widowed in 1861.

From 1873 to the abolition in 1876, he was member of the Auckland Provincial Council for the Whangarei electorate. He represented the Marsden electorate from 1876 until his retirement at the 1879 election. During his time in parliament, he was an active part of the opposition against the Grey Ministry. Douglas had cancer, and for the last few weeks of his life, he stayed with his brother-in-law, C. H. Ashford. He died on 28 February 1884, and his wife died in 1919.

== Notes ==
New Zealand Parliament
| Preceded by John Munro | Member of Parliament for Marsden; 1876–1879 | Succeeded by William Colbeck |
Baronetage of the United Kingdom
| Preceded by Robert Douglas | Baronet (of Glenbervie); 1843–1884 | Succeeded by Kenneth Douglas |
