= Gibson baronets =

Set index for Gibson baronets

There have been four baronetcies created for persons with the surname Gibson, one in the Baronetage of Nova Scotia and three in the Baronetage of the United Kingdom. Two of the creations are extinct.

- Gibson baronets of Keirhill (1702): see Gibson-Craig-Carmichael baronets
- Gibson baronets of Regent Terrace (1909): see Sir James Puckering Gibson, 1st Baronet (1849–1912)
- Gibson baronets of Great Warley (1926)
- Gibson baronets of Linconia and Faccombe (1931)

== See also ==
- Gibson-Craig baronets
