= Gibson-Craig-Carmichael baronets =

British title

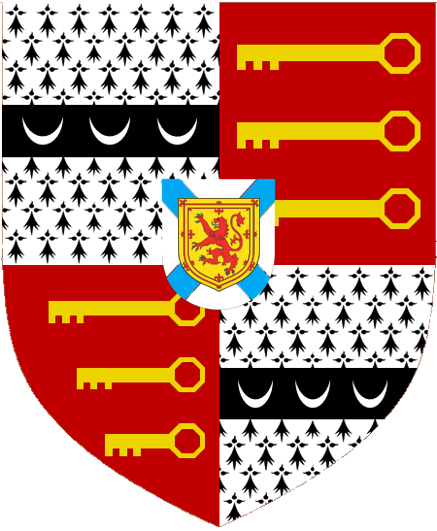
Quarterly: 1st and 4th, Ermine on a Fess Sable three Crescents Argent (Craig of Riccarton); 2nd and 3rd, Gules three Keys fesswise in pale wards downwards Or (Gibson of Keirhill)

The Gibson, later Gibson-Carmichael, later Gibson-Craig-Carmichael Baronetcy, of Keirhill in the County of Edinburgh, is a title in the Baronetage of Nova Scotia. It was created on 31 December 1702 for Thomas Gibson, with remainder to his heirs male. The sixth Baronet assumed the additional surname of Carmichael. The eleventh Baronet was a Liberal politician. In 1912, he was created Baron Carmichael, of Skirling in the County of Peebles, in the Peerage of the United Kingdom. The barony died in 1926, while he was succeeded in the baronetcy by his kinsman Sir Henry Thomas Gibson-Craig-Carmichael, 5th Baronet, of Riccarton, who became the twelfth Baronet of Keirhill and assumed the additional surname of Carmichael.

== Gibson, later Gibson-Carmichael, later Gibson-Craig-Carmichael baronets, of Keirhill (1702) ==
- Sir Thomas Gibson, 1st Baronet (died c. 1713)
- Sir Edward Gibson, 2nd Baronet (died 1727)
- Sir Alexander Gibson, 3rd Baronet (died 1774)
- Sir John Gibson, 4th Baronet (died 1781)
- Sir Robert Gibson, 5th Baronet (died c. 1800)
- Sir John Gibson-Carmichael, 6th Baronet (1773–1803)
- Sir Thomas Gibson-Carmichael, 7th Baronet (1774–1849)
- Sir Alexander Gibson-Carmichael, 8th Baronet (1812–1850) FRSE
- Sir Thomas Gibson-Carmichael, 9th Baronet (1817–1855)
- Sir William Henry Gibson-Carmichael, 10th Baronet (1827–1891)
- Sir Thomas David Gibson-Carmichael, 11th Baronet (1859–1926) (created Baron Carmichael in 1912)

== Barons Carmichael (1912) ==
- Thomas David Gibson-Carmichael, 1st Baron Carmichael (1859–1926)

== Gibson, later Gibson-Carmichael, later Gibson-Craig-Carmichael baronets, of Keirhill (1702; reverted) ==
- Sir Henry Thomas Gibson-Craig-Carmichael, 12th Baronet, 5th Baronet (1885–1926)
- Sir Eardley Charles William Gibson-Craig-Carmichael, 13th Baronet, 6th Baronet (1887–1939)
- Sir (Archibald Henry) William Gibson-Craig-Carmichael, 14th Baronet, 7th Baronet (1917–1969)
- Sir David Peter William Gibson-Craig-Carmichael, 15th Baronet, 8th Baronet (1946–2025)
- Sir Peter William Gibson-Craig-Carmichael, 16th Baronet, 9th Baronet (born 1975)

The heir apparent to the baronetcy is Christopher Robin Gibson-Craig-Carmichael (born 2017), eldest son and heir of the 16th Baronet.

== See also ==
- Gibson baronets
- Gibson-Craig baronets
