= Gibson baronets of Linconia and Faccombe (1931) =

The Gibson baronetcy, of Linconia, and of Faccombe in the County of Southampton, was created in the Baronetage of the United Kingdom on 10 August 1931 for Herbert Gibson. He was an Argentina-based merchant and served as Chairman of the Inter-Allied Commission for Purchase of Cereals in Argentina and Uruguay from 1917 to 1919.

== Gibson baronets, of Linconia and Faccombe (1931) ==
- Sir Herbert Gibson, 1st Baronet (1868–1934)
- Sir Christopher Herbert Gibson, 2nd Baronet (1897–1962)
- Sir Christopher Herbert Gibson, 3rd Baronet (1921–1994)
- The Rev. Sir Christopher Herbert Gibson, 4th Baronet (born 1948), ordained in 1975. The Official Roll marks the baronetcy as dormant.

The heir presumptive is the present holder's cousin Robert Herbert Gibson (born 1966).
