= Gibson-Craig baronets =

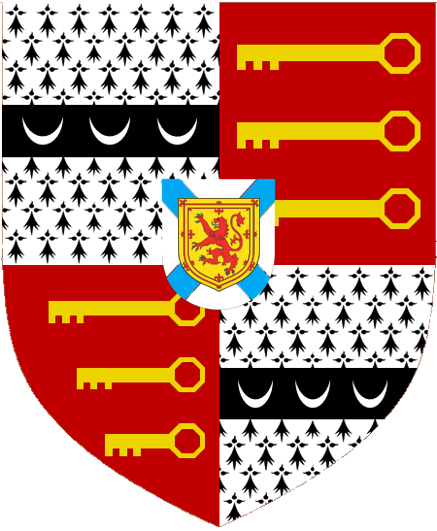
Escutcheon of the Gibson-Craig baronets

The Gibson-Craig, later Gibson-Craig-Carmichael baronetcy, of Riccarton in the County of Midlothian, was created in the Baronetage of the United Kingdom on 30 September 1831 for James Gibson-Craig, of 7 North St Andrew Square, Edinburgh, a Scottish lawyer and government official, formerly a supporter of Charles James Fox. Born James Gibson, he assumed the additional surname of Craig in 1818.

The 2nd Baronet was a Liberal politician and represented Midlothian and Edinburgh in the House of Commons. The 5th Baronet succeeded his kinsman as 12th Baronet of Keirhill in 1926 and assumed the additional surname of Carmichael.

== Gibson-Craig, later Gibson-Craig-Carmichael baronets, of Riccarton (1831) ==
- Sir James Gibson-Craig, 1st Baronet (1765–1850)
- Sir William Gibson-Craig, 2nd Baronet (1797–1878)
- Sir James Henry Gibson-Craig, 3rd Baronet (1841–1908)
- Sir Archibald Charles Gibson-Craig, 4th Baronet (1883–1914) killed in the First World War serving in the Highland Light Infantry
- Sir Henry Thomas Gibson-Craig-Carmichael, 5th Baronet (1885–1926) (succeeded as 12th Baronet of Keirhill in 1926)

See Gibson-Craig-Carmichael baronets for further succession.

== See also ==
- Gibson baronets

== Notes ==
Baronetage of the United Kingdom
Preceded by Foster baronets	Gibson-Craig baronets of Riccarton; 30 September 1831	Succeeded by Harty baronets
