= Foster baronets of Glyde Court (1831) =

Extinct baronetcy in Ireland

Escutcheon of the Foster baronets of Glyde Court

The Foster baronetcy, of Glyde Court in the County of Louth, was created in the Baronetage of the United Kingdom on 30 September 1831 for the diplomat Augustus Foster. The title became extinct on the death of the 4th Baronet in 1947.

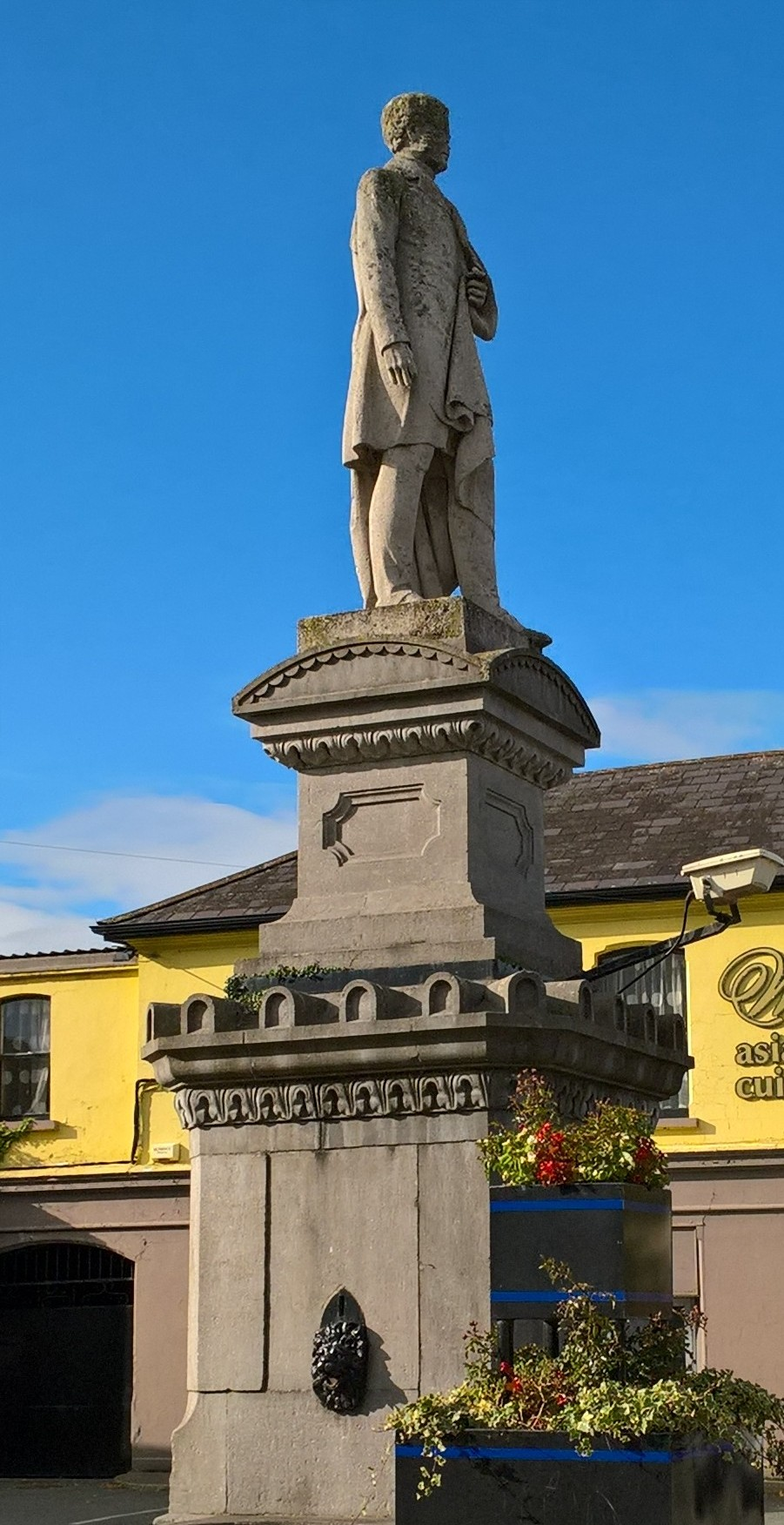
Statue of Sir Frederick Foster, 2nd Baronet, in Ardee

== Foster baronets, of Glyde Court (1831) ==
- Sir Augustus John Foster, 1st Baronet (1780–1848), son of Lady Elizabeth Foster. He married 1815 Albina Hobart, daughter of Hon. George Vere Hobart. He was knighted 1825 and raised to a baronetcy 1831. The influence of his stepfather William Cavendish, 5th Duke of Devonshire was exercised at the instance of his mother, the Duke's second Duchess. The 1st Baronet, who committed suicide, was succeeded by his eldest son
- Sir Frederick George Foster, 2nd Baronet (1816–1857) who died unmarried. Hr was succeeded by his next brother
- Rev. Sir Cavendish Hervey Foster, 3rd Baronet (1817–1890), married 1844 Isabella Todd. He was a cleric who served as rector of Theydon Garnon 1843–1887. Both their sons predeceased their father. Their elder son was Major John Frederick Foster (1847–1890) died six months before his father. He was the father of
- Sir Augustus Vere Foster, 4th Baronet (1873–1947), son of John Frederick Foster and his wife Caroline Emily Marsh. He married 25 October Charlotte Philippa Marion ffolkes, 3rd and youngest daughter of Rev. Henry Everard ffolkes, uncle and heir presumptive to Sir William ffolkes, 3rd Bt. (1847–1912), and sister of the 4th and 5th baronets. They had issue a son (died in his father's lifetime) and two daughters.
  - Philippa Eugenie (Biddy) Vere Foster (1898–1962)
  - Dorothy Elizabeth Charlotte Vere Foster (1903–)
  - Anthony Vere Foster (21 February 1908 – 1934)

The baronetcy became extinct in 1947, on the death of the 4th Baronet who left no heir.

== Extended family ==
The last baronet's sister Alice was paternal grandmother of Anna Wintour. Fitzgerald Wintour married, secondly in 1912, Alice Jane Blanche Foster of Glyde Court, daughter of Major John Frederick Foster.

== Notes ==
Baronetage of the United Kingdom
Preceded by Douglas baronets	Foster baronets of Glyde Court; 30 September 1831	Succeeded by Gibson baronets
