= Sir Robert Douglas, 6th Baronet =

Sir Robert Douglas of Glenbervie, 6th Baronet (1694 – 24 April 1770) was a notable genealogist responsible for one of the major works on Scottish families, The Baronage of Scotland.

== Works ==
No substantive Scottish peerage had appeared since George Crawfurd's in 1716. In 1764, Douglas published the volume, The Peerage of Scotland; with a dedication to the Earl of Morton and a list of subscribers prefixed. In his preface Douglas stated that he had sent for corrections and additions a manuscript copy of each account of a peerage to the contemporary holder of it. There are references in the margin to the manuscript and other authorities.

In the preface to the peerage Douglas spoke of issuing a second part containing a baronage of Scotland, here using the word "baronage" in the limited sense of the Scottish gentry or lesser barons; Sir George Mackenzie had left materials for a work of that kind. In September 1767 he announced in the newspapers that the baronage was in the press; but before the publication of any part of it Douglas died. In 1798 appeared the first volume of his Baronage of Scotland, containing an Historical and Genealogical Account of the Gentry of that Kingdom, some of the concluding pages of which are by the editors, whose promise in their preface to issue a second volume was not fulfilled. The volume includes the baronets of Scotland.

In 1813, a second edition of Douglas's chief work was published as, The Peerage of Scotland, Second Edition, Revised and Corrected by John Philip Wood, Esq., with Engravings of the Arms of the Peers. Prefixed to it is a list of Scottish noblemen and gentlemen who furnished the editor with documentary and other information. Wood incorporated in it a number of corrections of the first edition made by Lord Hailes (some of his unpublished critical comments were given by James Maidment). John Riddell referred to errors committed both by Douglas and by Wood.

In 1795, Douglas's 'Genealogies of the Family of Lind and the Montgomeries of Smithton' was privately printed at Windsor.

== Family ==
Robert was the second son of Sir Robert Douglas, 4th Baronet, of Glenbervie (1661–1748) by his second wife, Jane Paterson, Lady Dunmure (d. 1750), and succeeded his half-brother, Sir William Douglas, 5th Baronet, who died childless.

He married, circa 1738, Margaret, daughter of Sir James Macdonald, 3rd Lord Sleat and 6th Baronet (d. 1723), by his spouse Janet, daughter of Alexander Macleod of Talisker & Greshornish. They had three sons (two of whom died young), and a daughter, Janet (eventual heiress of this family), who married Kenneth Mackenzie, son of Donald Mackenzie of Rossshire and Elizabeth Mackenzie of Highfield, and left children. Their son, Lieutenant Kenneth Mackenzie (1754–1833) (later changed to Douglas) became a baronet.

Sir Robert was succeeded by his son and heir: Sir Alexander Douglas (1738–1812), 7th Baronet, of Glenbervie. He married Barbara (d. 1815), daughter of James Carnegie of Findhaven, but left no children.

== See also ==
- The Scots Peerage

== Notes ==
Attribution

This article incorporates text from a publication now in the public domain: "Douglas, Robert (1694-1770)". Dictionary of National Biography. London: Smith, Elder & Co. 1885–1900.

Baronetage of Nova Scotia
Preceded by William Douglas	Baronet (of Glenbervie); 1764–1770	Succeeded by Alexander Douglas
