= William Colbeck =

William Colbeck may refer to:

- William Colbeck (gangster) (1890–1943), St. Louis politician and organized crime figure
- William Colbeck (seaman) (1871–1930), British seaman who distinguished himself on two Antarctic expeditions
- William Henry Colbeck (1823–1901), Member of Parliament in New Zealand
