= Clearsprings Ready Homes =

British housing company

- Industry: Housing
- Founded: 1999
- Founder: Graham King
- Revenue: £1+ billion (2024)
- Net income: ▲£180 million (2024); £62 million (2023)
- Owner: Graham King
- Parent: Clearsprings Group
- Website: https://www.ready-homes.co.uk/

Clearsprings Ready Homes is a British company which provides housing services, primarily for the Home Office. Clearsprings have operated all asylum seeker housing in Wales since 2012, and have also operated asylum seeker housing in England. They are responsible for housing 30,000 asylum seekers in Southern England, London, and Wales.

Founded in 1999 by Graham King, the company reached an annual turnover of more than £1 billion in 2023, and in 2024 recorded profits of more than £180 million. King is one of the 350 richest people in the United Kingdom.

Accommodation and services provided by Clearsprings have been repeatedly investigated and criticised for their poor quality, with some asylum seekers living in what has been described as "dire living conditions".

== History ==
Clearsprings Ready Homes is a subsidiary of Clearsprings (Management) Ltd. and was previously part of Clearel Limited. It was founded in 1999 by Graham King.

In 2007, Clearsprings won a contract to operate Approved Premises for people on bail – it subsequently opened more than 160 housing units. The company was accused of failing to properly consult local councils about their accommodation. In 2015 the company was investigated by HM Revenue and Customs relating to its taxes; it later paid more than £200,000 in a settlement. Clearsprings were also fined £60,000 in 2021 for offences relating to a property in Newport which included failing to maintain fire alarms.

The company's directors were paid £7 million in dividends in 2021 as they reported a £4.4 million annual profit, and nearly £28 million in 2022, as company profits increased to more than £28 million. Profits increased in 2023 to £62 million with an annual turnover in excess of £1 billion, and more than £180 million in 2024. Clearsprings Ready Homes' contracts with the Home Office mandate that they pay back profits of more than 5%.

Despite agreements between local councils in the United Kingdom to not outbid each other for temporary accommodation, in 2023 several authorities complained that the Home Office was preferentially providing housing to Clearsprings Ready Homes, who paid more for accommodation than local councils.

Graham King was named as one of the 350 richest people in the United Kingdom in 2024, with a net worth of £750 million. He, and Clearsprings Ready Homes, were criticised in 2024 after the company paid £16 million to a company not registered in the United Kingdom, which some suggested could be an offshore company intended to avoid paying tax. King's net worth surpassed £1 billion in 2025.

== Asylum seeker housing ==
Clearsprings Ready Homes has provided accommodation for asylum seekers since at least 2000. It has operated all such accommodation in Wales since 2012, a contract which was valued at £119 million in 2016. The company currently has two ten-year contracts with the British government to operate accommodation for asylum seekers in Wales and the South of England until 2029. Originally announced as costing over £1 billion, the cost of the contracts had risen to £7 billion by 2026. Approximately half of the accommodation provided by Clearsprings is subcontracted to hotels.

At temporary asylum seeker accommodation run by Clearsprings in Cardiff, residents were forced to wear red wrist bands to receive food. After the practice sparked controversy in 2016, including comments from the First Minister, Clearsprings reported that they would be scrapping the scheme. The accommodation, Lynx House, had also been found to be overcrowded and host to poor living conditions. Problems included damp carpets, malfunctioning fire alarms, and leaking plumbing. The Home Office received 59 complaints about Clearsprings' accommodation services in 2016.

A 2019 investigation by The Guardian found that asylum seekers in Southall, London, were being housed in "dire living conditions" in properties managed by a company paid by Clearsprings, finding them to be overcrowded, lacking functioning facilities, and overrun with pests. Lawyers said the situation could be a breach of human rights legislation. The Home Office said that "urgent action" would be taken to rectify problems in the housing, and soon after the investigation was published improvements were made.

Starting in 2020, Clearsprings operated asylum seeker housing at the former military camp in Penally, Pembrokeshire, and at Napier Barracks in Kent. Residents at these sites have gone on hunger strike and have attempted suicide. Volunteers working at the Napier barracks were made to sign confidentiality agreements under the Official Secrets Act. In January 2021 a fire was started at the Napier site; 14 men were arrested in response. Residents at Napier reported that they went without electricity, heating, and clean drinking water after the fire. Some residents reported "repeated" complaints to Clearsprings over poor living conditions, including poorly cooked food. The Red Cross called on the UK government to remove all asylum seekers from the location due to the conditions. Napier Barracks was closed in December 2025, with housing developments planned for the site.

In December 2021 another investigation by The Guardian revealed the poor conditions of asylum seekers living in Clearsprings operated flats in Uxbridge and South Ruislip, with residents housed for multiple years in accommodation which was too small, dirty, damp or poorly maintained. Clearsprings stated they would be making urgent repairs in response and moved some residents to other accommodation.

In January 2022 an investigation by Corporate Watch and The Canary revealed asylum seekers were being housed in an insect-infested hotel in London ran by Clearsprings. In addition to bed bugs, a family of eight reportedly experienced a ceiling caving in, water leaks from the apartment above, insufficient food, lack of hot water, lack of electricity, and a dangerous electrical installation.

Stay Belvedere Hotels, a subcontractor of Clearsprings Ready Homes, ran 51 hotels providing asylum seeker accommodation, including Napier Barracks. The UK government ended their contract in 2025 following a review which found the company's performance did not meet expectations.

In 2026, Clearsprings Ready Homes paid £140,000 in fines to Swindon Borough Council, after it was issued financial penalties by the council for failing to comply with regulations 27 times during 2022.
