= Sir Herbert Gibson, 1st Baronet, of Linconia and Faccombe =

Sir Herbert Gibson, 1st Baronet KBE (8 July 1863 – 28 December 1934) was a British-Argentinian landowner and agriculturist in Argentina.

Gibson was born at Bridge of Allan, Stirlingshire, and educated at the Norfolk County School. He became a landowner and livestock breeder in Argentina, where his family had owned property since 1819. He took active part in public affairs in Argentina. He became an Argentinian citizen in 1888, allowing him to serve as mayor of the town of Ajó (also known as General Lavalle). He was chairman of the British Chamber of Commerce in Argentina and vice-president of the Sociedad Rural Argentina, a landowners' organization. He resumed British citizenship in 1915 and was Wheat Commissioner in Argentina and Uruguay for a Royal Commission on Wheat Supplies, set up in 1916 during the First World War to manage the purchase and distribution of grain supplies for Great Britain and the Allies.

For his service as Wheat Commissioner, Gibson was knighted in the 1919 New Year Honours. He was created a Baronet of the United Kingdom in the 1931 Birthday Honours "for services in connection with the British Empire Trade Exhibition at Buenos Aires." He became "Sir Herbert Gibson of Linconia [La Linconia, his estate in Argentina] and of Faccombe in the County of Southampton".

Baronetage of the United Kingdom
New creation	Baronet (of Linconia and Faccombe); 1931–1934	Succeeded by Christopher Herbert Gibson
