= Corporate Watch =

Research group based in the United Kingdom

The Corporate Watch logo

Corporate Watch (The Corporate Watch Co-Operative Ltd.) is a research group based in the UK. It describes itself as a "research group that helps people stand up against corporations and capitalism." And as a "not-for-profit co-operative providing critical information on the social and environmental impacts of corporations and capitalism." It was established in 1996.

Corporate Watch is run as a workers' co-operative. It is incorporated as a company, limited by guarantee, and registered in the United Kingdom, number 03865674.

== Research ==
Corporate Watch has two main research approaches:

- "Targeted research for grassroots campaign groups". For example, researchers have worked with neighbourhood housing campaigns, precarious workers' trade unions, environmental groups, migrant solidarity groups, care workers, and families of prisoners. This research can support campaigns by "e.g. profiling a particular company, digging into its accounts, uncovering scandals, finding weak points."
- "Broader research and analysis into how capitalism works, issues and news." This includes producing books on subjects such as the AZ of Green Capitalism, The UK Border Regime, or Prison Island (on UK prison expansion).

Corporate Watch encourages "individuals and groups to contact us with information and requests about companies they think need looking into."

== Training ==
Corporate Watch also provides training and resources so that more people can learn how to investigate companies. These include:

- Tailored training sessions for "groups, organisations and individuals who want to investigate a company and its actions." These are run free for unfunded grassroots groups and campaigns; larger groups such as unions, universities and NGOs pay on a sliding scale.
- The free "Know Your Enemy" online course
- Investigating Companies: a Do-It-Yourself Handbook, which can be downloaded for free from the Corporate Watch website

== Research areas and notable investigations ==
=== Environment ===
- "Wreckers of the Earth" map. Corporate Watch's "Wreckers of the Earth" project is a map and directory of "300 London-based companies destroying the planet". It was first published in 2020, and updated in October 2021. It includes a poster map for printing; an online map using OpenStreetMap, listing all the companies' main office locations; and a company directory with entries giving the companies' addresses and explaining what they do. The second edition was published in the run-up to the COP 26 Climate Summit in Glasgow, where it was used by campaign groups including "Glasgow Calls Out Polluters"—who also produced an accompanying "Polluters Map" of Glasgow.
- HS2 "who profits?". Corporate Watch has supported the campaign against the UK's planned HS2 (High Speed 2) railway, producing a "poster explainer" on "who profits" from the scheme.
- In November 2021 Corporate Watch published a series of five reports on "Eco-defence and international solidarity". These highlighted ecological struggles around the world involving companies with bases in London.

=== Housing ===
A core strand of Corporate Watch's work has been investigating landlords and property developers in support of tenants' groups and people opposing the "gentrification" of their neighbourhoods. Examples include:

- Report on Glasgow Housing Association (part of Wheatley Group), investigating its rent rise plans and finances, in support of Scottish tenants' union Living Rent
- Reports on housing outsourcing company Mears Group, supporting the "Mears Cats" tenants group in East London, as well as residents of its Government-contracted housing for asylum seekers.
- A report on the Australian-based multinational property developer Lendlease. This was used as part of the successful 2017-18 campaign against the "Haringey Development Vehicle" in London, the UK's biggest proposed privatisation of local property assets. (Lendlease responded to the Corporate Watch report with a rebuttal on its website. It said: the report "sought to paint our company as one that exploited urban communities and duped their elected leaders in a grab for profit. If this was true as written, our business model would be short-lived.")
- Investigations into the finances of Hyde Housing, for tenants groups in London and South East England
- Report on Grainger, one of the companies leading the growth of new "Build to Rent" private landlord developments in the UK

=== "Covid Capitalism" and vaccine profiteering ===
During the COVID-19 pandemic in 2020 and 2021 Corporate Watch published two series of articles and reports on "#CoronaCapitalism" and "Vaccine Capitalism". The "Covid Capitalism" articles investigated companies profiting from the early stages of the Covid-19 pandemic, including outsourcing companies winning UK government contracts with little scrutiny. An article "Six ways that capitalism spreads the crisis" argued that the spread of the COVID-19 pandemic, and responses to it, were closely connected to structures of global capitalism.

The "Vaccine capitalism" series looked at the profits being forecast by pharmaceutical companies Pfizer, Moderna and AstraZeneca. Corporate Watch argued that these companies were making "huge profits" from vaccine sales, even though most R&D into the vaccines was heavily subsidised by public funds. (It included AstraZeneca in this critique, arguing that the company's claims to be forgoing profits from its vaccine were hollow in several respects.) It identified the source of these high profits in the intellectual property system that allows major corporations to patent drugs such as vaccines.

=== "The UK Border Regime" ===
Corporate Watch produces research in support of migrant campaigns, and groups opposing immigration raids, immigration detention and deportations. In particular, it produces regular reports on the companies profiteering from the UK's "Border Regime". These include:

- Reports on the security firms that run immigration detention centres in the UK: Mitie, G4S, Serco, and GEO Group.
- Investigations revealing the airlines that carry out deportation flights. These have looked at both charter airlines such as Titan, Tui, Privilege Style, and Hi Fly. And also scheduled airlines including British Airways, Easyjet and others.
- Investigations into the "Asylum Housing" contractors that have Government contracts to provide housing for asylum seekers, including in ex-military barracks camps such as Napier in Kent, and Penally in Wales (now closed). These include Mears Group and Clearsprings Ready Homes. Corporate Watch also published an interview with the "Camp Residents of Penally (CROP)" residents union in support of their struggle for better conditions in the camp.

Corporate Watch's book The UK Border Regime, published in 2018, brings together much of the group's research on this area. It outlines how the UK immigration authorities work together as part of an overall "regime" with private sector contractors and collaborators, and also other players including lobby groups and media outlets pushing anti-migration messages.

Some recent reports have looked at:

- How Brexit is affecting UK immigration policies, including the Home Office's high profile "deportation drive" against migrants crossing the English Channel in small boats.
- The charities play in the "border regime": such as the charity funder Choose Love's decision to drop aid funding for migrants in Calais, which "whistleblower" sources claimed was linked to pressure from the Home Office.

== Collaborations and re-use by media ==
Research by Corporate Watch is often reused by news outlets, and some Corporate Watch investigations are co-published with commercial media outlets. Examples include:

- Homelessness charity involvement in immigration raids. In 2017, Corporate Watch revealed the role of UK homelessness charities including St Mungo's and Thames Reach in working with Home Office immigration officers. Charity outreach workers carried out joint patrols with Immigration Enforcement teams, and passed them information on rough-sleeping migrants, who were then targeted for deportation. The results of this investigation were co-published with The Guardian newspaper.
- Targeting of nationalities for deportation. In 2015, Corporate Watch won a legal "Freedom of Information" battle with the UK Home Office to release information which showed that the Home Office was targeting specific nationalities for "removal" from the UK. The Government had previously denied this. This was reported on by The Guardian.
- Harmondsworth detention centre. In 2014, Corporate Watch published undercover filming from inside Harmondsworth Immigration Removal Centre, the UK's biggest migrant detention centre, with Channel 4 News.
- Payday lender Wonga. Investigations into the tax avoidance arrangements and corporate structure of payday lender Wonga.com, were co-published with The Mirror newspaper in October 2013. They were also then picked up by Accountancy Age and This is Money, amongst others.

== Publications ==
Corporate Watch also publishes books, all of which are copyright free or licensed under Creative Commons licenses, and can be downloaded from the website.

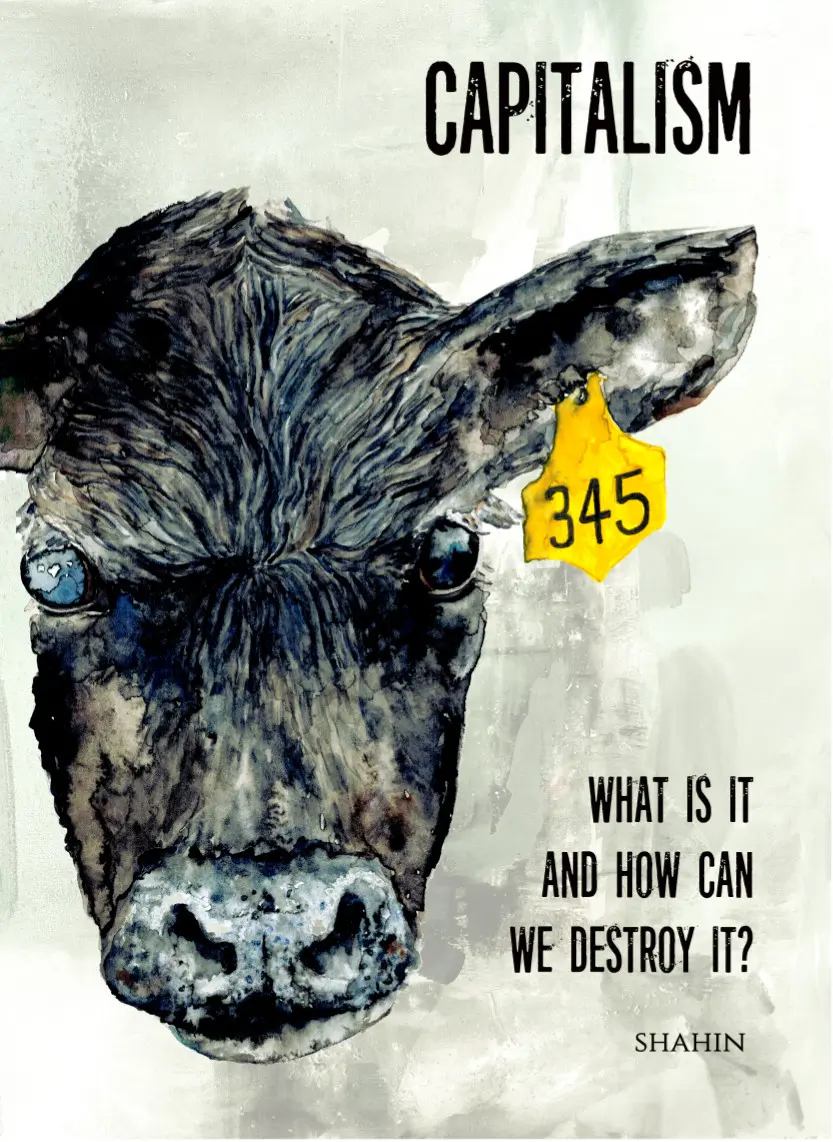

- TECH: A Guide to the Politics and Philosophy of Technology (2020)
- World's End (2019)
- The UK Border Regime (2018)
- Prison Island (2018)
- A to Z of Green Capitalism (2017)
- Capitalism, What is it and how can we destroy it? by Shahin (2017) ISBN 1907738193
- Investigating Companies: a Do-It-Yourself Handbook by Richard Whittell (2014)

A list of other Corporate Watch publications can be found here
