= Kenneth Douglas =

British Army officer (1754–1833)

Lieutenant-General Sir Kenneth Douglas Bt
- Born: 1754; Dundee
- Died: 22 November 1833 (aged 78–79); London
- Burial place: Hythe, Kent
- Spouse: Rachel Andrews (m. 1804)
- Military career
- Allegiance: United Kingdom
- Branch: British Army
- Service years: 1767–1833
- Rank: Lieutenant-general
- Commands: 44th Regiment of Foot; 52nd Regiment of Foot; Antwerp Citadel
- Conflicts: French Revolutionary Wars; Flanders campaign; Siege of Valenciennes; Siege of Dunkirk (WIA); Invasion of France; Mediterranean campaign; Capture of Minorca; Egypt campaign; Battle of Abukir; Napoleonic Wars; Peninsular War; Siege of Cádiz; Hundred Days

Lieutenant-General Sir Kenneth MacKenzie Douglas, 1st Baronet (born Kenneth MacKenzie; 1754 – 22 November 1833) was the first baronet of the Douglas of Glenbervie, Kincardine Baronetcy (second creation). He was created baronet in 1831.

Born as Kenneth MacKenzie in Dundee in 1754, his father was Kenneth Mackenzie, of Kilcoy, Ross-shire, and his mother Janet, a daughter of Sir Robert Douglas, 6th Baronet of Glenbervie (first creation).

He was commissioned as an ensign in the 33rd Foot in 1767, and was promoted lieutenant in 1775. MacKenzie transferred to the 14th Foot in 1783. He served in Guernsey, the West Indies, Flanders, Gibraltar, and Egypt. He joined the 90th Foot in 1794, when, under Thomas Graham, (later Lord Lynedoch), he trained light company troops. On the death of Lieutenant-Colonel Ogilvie of the 44th Foot, Mackenzie transferred to that regiment, taking command.

Following a decision by the British Army to train some line regiments in light infantry techniques, Sir John Moore, a proponent of the light infantry model, offered his own regiment of line infantry, the 52nd (Oxfordshire) Regiment of Foot, for this training, at Shorncliffe Camp. Mackenzie was appointed lieutenant colonel of the 52nd. They formed a brigade with the 95th Rifles, and three line regiments. Much of the training was undertaken by Lieutenant-Colonel Kenneth MacKenzie, who devised many of the tactics of light infantry training, He was responsible for many of the drills and exercises of the "Shorncliffe System".

Injured after a fall from a horse in late 1803, he took leave, during which time he married Rachel Andrews, of Shorncliffe. (They had 6 sons and one daughter.) He saw some active service at Cádiz, but his health remained poor, and he spent most of the war convalescing in England. In 1811 he was given command of the light infantry troops then in England. In early 1814 he served under Thomas Graham in the Netherlands, commanding the 2nd Division in the Expeditionary Corps. During the Hundred Days he commanded the citadel of Antwerp.

Made baronet in 1831 he also changed his surname to Douglas that year. He died in 1833 and was succeeded by his son Robert Andrew Douglas.

Military offices
Preceded by Lord Frederick Bentinck	Colonel of the 58th (Rutlandshire) Regiment of Foot; 1828–1833	Succeeded by Frederick Maitland
Baronetage of the United Kingdom
New creation	Baronet (of Glenbervie); 1831–1833	Succeeded by Robert Douglas
