= Douglas baronets of Glenbervie (first creation, 1625) =

Escutcheon of the Douglas baronets of Glenbervie

The Douglas baronetcy of Glenbervie, Kincardineshire, was created on 28 May 1625 in the Baronetage of Nova Scotia for William Douglas, son of Sir Robert Douglas of Glenbervie and his wife Elizabeth Auchinleck.

== Douglas baronets, of Glenbervie (1625) ==
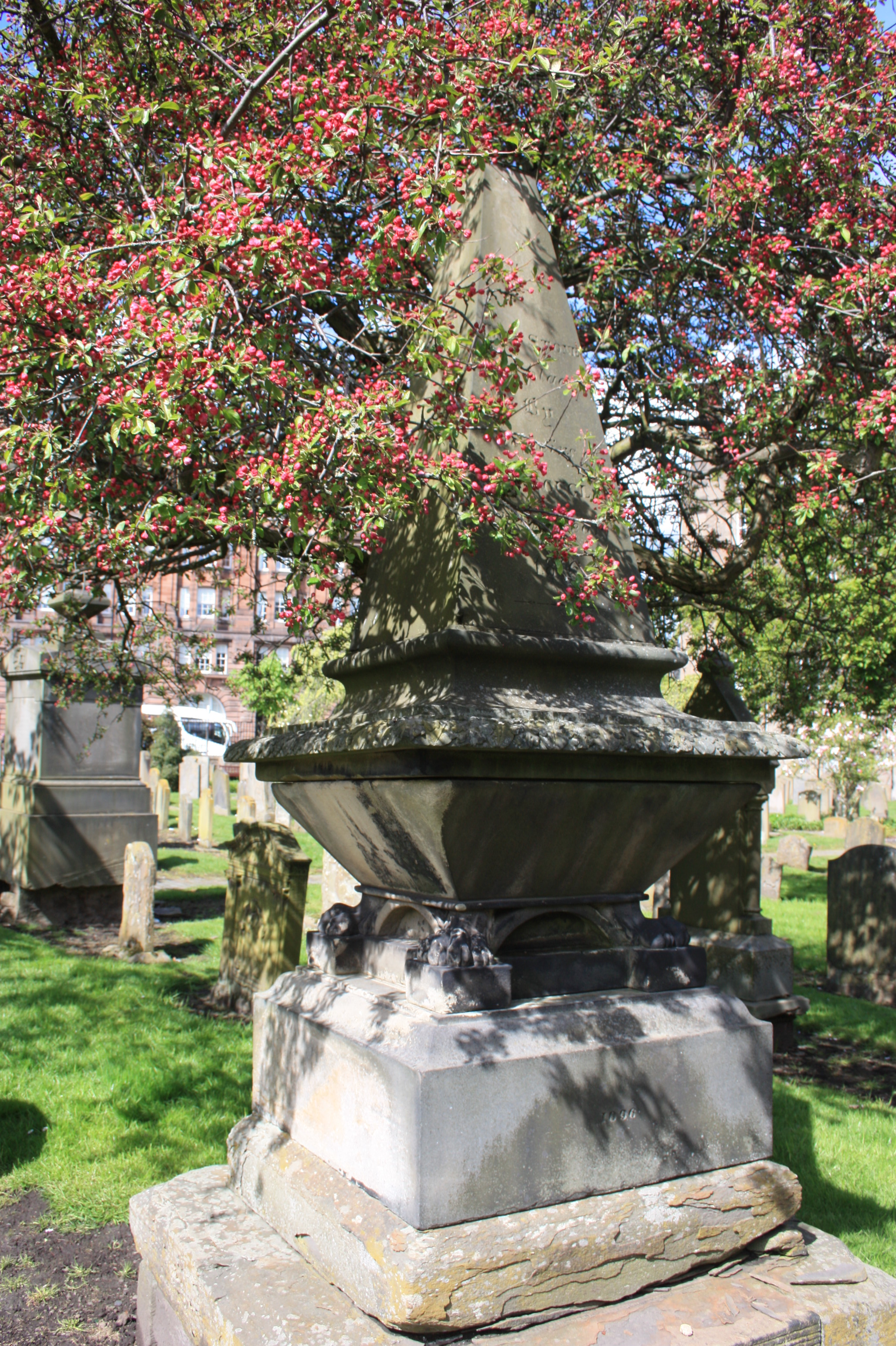
The grave of Sir Alexander Douglas of Glenbervie, the Howff Cemetery, Dundee

- Sir William Douglas, 1st Baronet (died c. 1660) grandson of William Douglas, 9th Earl of Angus
- Sir William Douglas, 2nd Baronet (died c. 1680)
- General Sir Robert Douglas, 3rd Baronet (died 24 July 1692), Colonel of the Royal Regiment of Foot, killed at the Battle of Steinkirk. (Cokayne mistakes the regiment as the Royal Scots Greys who were not at Steinkirk, for the Royal Scots who were.)
- Sir Robert Douglas, 4th Baronet (c 1662 – 27 January 1748)
- Sir William Douglas, 5th Baronet (c 1690 – 23 July 1764)
- Sir Robert Douglas, 6th Baronet (1694 – 24 April 1770)
- Sir Alexander Douglas, 7th Baronet FRCPE (1738 – 28 November 1812)

On the death of the 7th Baronet the baronetcy became dormant. It is now considered extinct by the Official Roll.
