= Douglas baronets =

There have been six Douglas baronetcies created, two each in the Baronetage of Nova Scotia, Baronetage of Great Britain and Baronetage of the United Kingdom. One only is extant.

- Douglas baronets of Glenbervie (first creation, 1625)
- Douglas baronets of Kelhead (1668)
- Douglas baronets of Carr (1777)
- Douglas baronets of Maxwell (1786)
- Douglas baronets of Castle Douglas (1801): see Sir William Douglas, 1st Baronet (died 1809)
- Douglas baronets of Glenbervie (second creation, 1831)
