= Gibson baronets of Great Warley (1926) =

The Gibson baronetcy, of Great Warley in the County of Essex, was created in the Baronetage of the United Kingdom on 1 February 1926 for Herbert Gibson. He was a solicitor and served as president of the Law Society in 1925. The title became extinct on the death of the 4th Baronet in 1997.

== Gibson baronets, of Great Warley (1926) ==
- Sir Herbert Gibson, 1st Baronet (1851–1932)
- Sir Kenneth Lloyd Gibson, 2nd Baronet (1888–1967)
- Sir Ackroyd Herbert Gibson, 3rd Baronet (1893–1975), succeeded his elder brother
- Sir David Ackroyd Gibson, 4th Baronet (1922–1997). A Catholic priest, he did not use the title.
