= Shorncliffe Army Camp =

Military base in England

- Cheriton
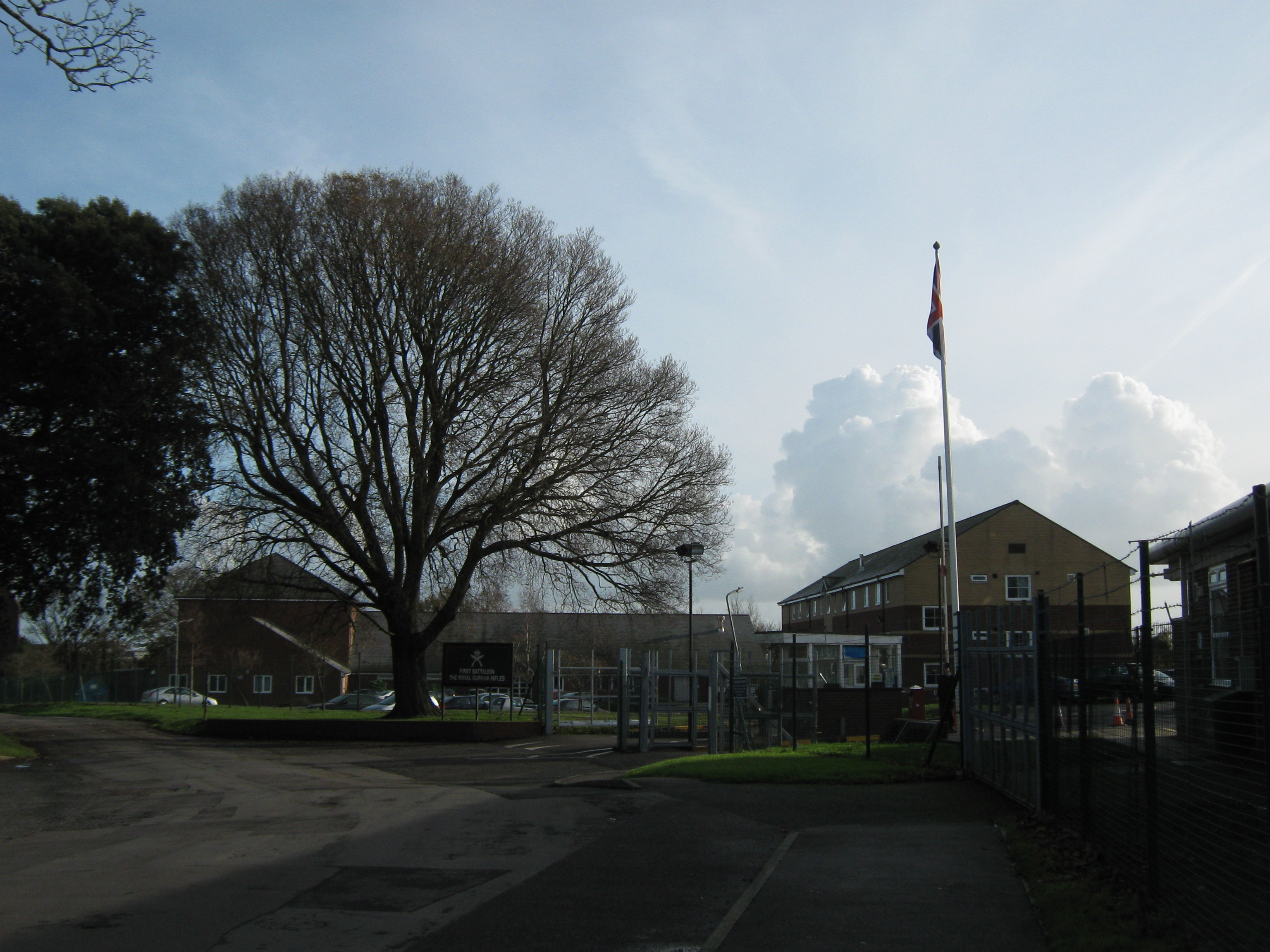
- Shorncliffe Army Camp

Site information
- Type: Barracks
- Owner: Ministry of Defence
- Operator: British Army

Location
- Location within Kent
- Coordinates: 51°04′33″N 01°07′53″E

Site history
- Built: 1794
- Built for: War Office
- In use: 1794–Present

Shorncliffe Army Camp is a British Army installation near Cheriton in Kent, England established in 1794. The camp, described as "the birthplace of the modern British Army", previously consisted of Ross Barracks, Burgoyne Barracks, Somerset Barracks, Napier Barracks, Risborough Barracks and Sir John Moore Barracks, however, due to closures, the latter is all that remains in military use.

== History ==
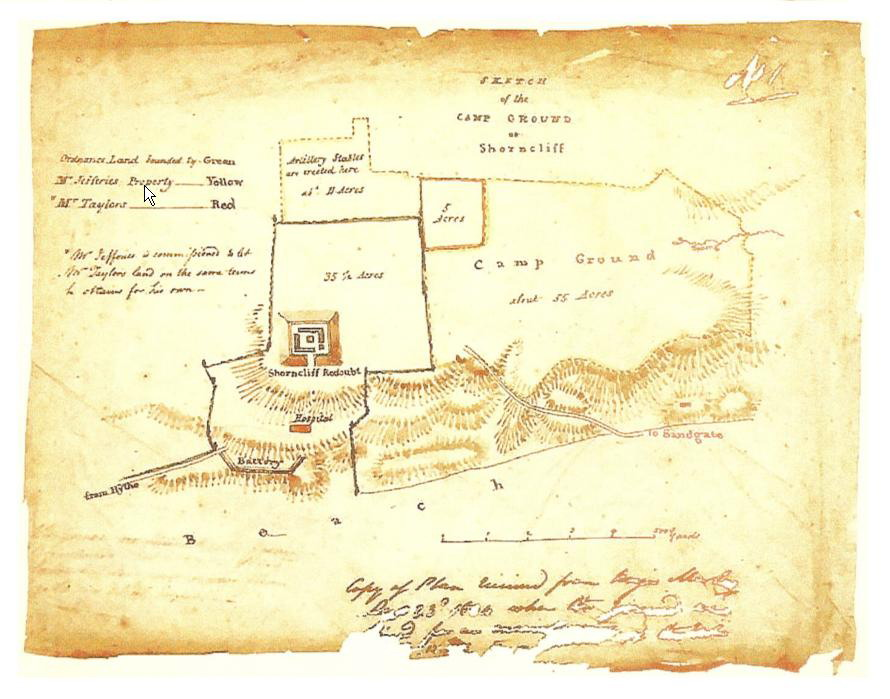
Map dated 1801 showing Shorncliffe Redoubt on the left and the camp ground on the right

The camp was established in 1794 when the British Army bought over 229 acres of land at Shorncliffe; it was then extended in 1796 and 1806. It was at Shorncliffe that, in 1803, Sir John Moore trained the Light Division that fought under the Duke of Wellington in the Napoleonic Wars. In 1890, hutted camp facilities were replaced with permanent facilities known as Moore Barracks, Napier Barracks, Ross Barracks, Royal Engineers Barracks (later known as Burgoyne Barracks) and Somerset Barracks. Risborough Barracks was established by 1910.

Shorncliffe was used as a staging post for troops destined for the Western Front during the First World War, and in April 1915, a Canadian Training Division was formed there. The Canadian Army Medical Corps had general hospitals based at Shorncliffe from September 1917 to December 1918. The camp at that time composed five unit lines known as Moore Barracks, Napier Barracks, Risborough Barracks, Ross Barracks and Somerset Barracks. On three occasions, there were German air raids which killed soldiers in the camp.

During the Second World War, Shorncliffe was again used as a staging post and Queen Mary visited the camp in 1939.

From 1967, the camp was home to the Junior Infantryman's Battalion (JIB) and later, the Infantry Junior Leaders Battalion (IJLB) until the dissolution of junior soldier recruitment in 1991.

On 2 April 2013, it was announced that land forming part of Shorncliffe Garrison would be sold to create 1,200 new homes. Proceeds from the sale would be reinvested to provide "better facilities for service men and women". Taylor Wimpey were confirmed as the preferred bidder.

The Royal Gurkha Rifles have been based at Sir John Moore Barracks, Shorncliffe since 2001. 2nd (South East) Brigade was also based in Sir John Moore Barracks until January 2015, when it merged with 11th Light Brigade to form 11th Infantry Brigade and Headquarters South East, based at Aldershot Garrison.

== Future ==
In November 2016, Defence Secretary Sir Michael Fallon announced in the House of Commons that Somerset Barracks was to close.

In January 2023, it was reported that so far 547 new homes had been built on the site of the former barracks - and there were 653 more to go. Somerset Barracks were demolished and replaced with new houses and flats, much of Burgoyne Barracks had also been flattened and some of the new properties had been built. The demolition of Risborough Barracks was underway. The former stable block at Shorncliffe Garrison in Folkestone is set to be demolished. Napier barracks was closed in December 2025, with housing developments planned for the site.

== Use of Napier Barracks by Home Office ==
On 22 September 2020, Napier Barracks began to be used by the Home Office to provide temporary accommodation for asylum seekers. According to a UK Visas & Immigration factsheet titled Contingency Asylum Accommodation Ministry of Defence sites, "The sites are being used to accommodate single, adult male asylum seekers. These are people who have claimed asylum in the United Kingdom, and whose asylum claims are under consideration." The camp was operated by Stay Belvedere Hotels, who were subcontracted by Clearsprings Ready Homes.

On 26 January 2021, in a debate in the House of Commons titled UK Border: Covid Protections, Zarah Sultana said that "One hundred people in the camp—that is, one in four—have tested positive for covid." Home Secretary Priti Patel responded "The reason the base was made available is that in line with Public Health England guidelines, because of coronavirus, we need space for social distancing, which has been absolutely in place."

On 29 January 2021, a building providing accommodation to asylum seekers at Napier Barracks suffered damage as a result of fire. Arrests were made by Kent Police in connection with a disturbance at the site on the same day.

The site ceased to be used by the Home Office alongside the closure of Napier Barracks at the end of 2025.

== The Shorncliffe System ==
The units stationed here during the Napoleonic wars greatly affected military history from this point onward. The light infantry trained at Shorncliffe were a new breed of soldier more akin to the soldiers of the modern British Army than their contemporaries. Using the "Shorncliffe Method", devised by Lt-Col Kenneth Mackenzie, the soldiers were taught to think for themselves and act on initiative. A high proportion of them were literate, which was unusual for the time. Moreover, in an age when many officers received no training, the light infantry officers drilled with the men. Their battlefield tactics were the embryonic emergence of current military manoeuvres, often fighting in skirmish formation ahead of the British main battle line.

In the Victorian era, the Redoubt was converted to a dwelling for the camp commandant. Many of the bricks used in the construction of the house were reused from the original Redoubt building.

== Current garrison ==
In 2011, the camp consisted of: Burgoyne Barracks, Sir John Moore Barracks, Napier Barracks, Risborough Barracks and Somerset Barracks. However, all that currently remains is Sir John Moore Barracks, after the other 4 barracks were demolished and land sold to make way for a new 1200 home housing estate.

Below is a list of the units currently based at the location.

British Army

- 1st Battalion OR 2nd Battalion, Royal Gurkha Rifles

Community Cadet Forces

- Folkestone and Hythe Sea Cadets
- Shorncliffe Detachment, Kent Army Cadet Force

== Shorncliffe Military Cemetery ==
The Shorncliffe Military Cemetery serving the camp is also property of the Ministry of Defence. Three Victoria Cross recipients are buried here:

- Private Patrick McHale (1826–1866), 5th Regiment of Foot, Indian Mutiny
- Sergeant Joseph Charles Brennan (1818–1872), Royal Artillery, Indian Mutiny
- Private John Doogan (1853–1940), King's Dragoon Guards, First Boer War

It contains more than 600 Commonwealth war graves from both world wars. There are 471 from World War I, including more than 300 Canadians, and 6 members of the Chinese Labour Corps. There are 81 buried from World War II, including one unidentified British soldier and a Polish war grave. A screen wall memorial lists 18 Belgian soldiers who were originally buried in a now-demolished mausoleum.
