= Shorncliffe Redoubt =

Coordinates: 51°4′32″N 1°7′46″E

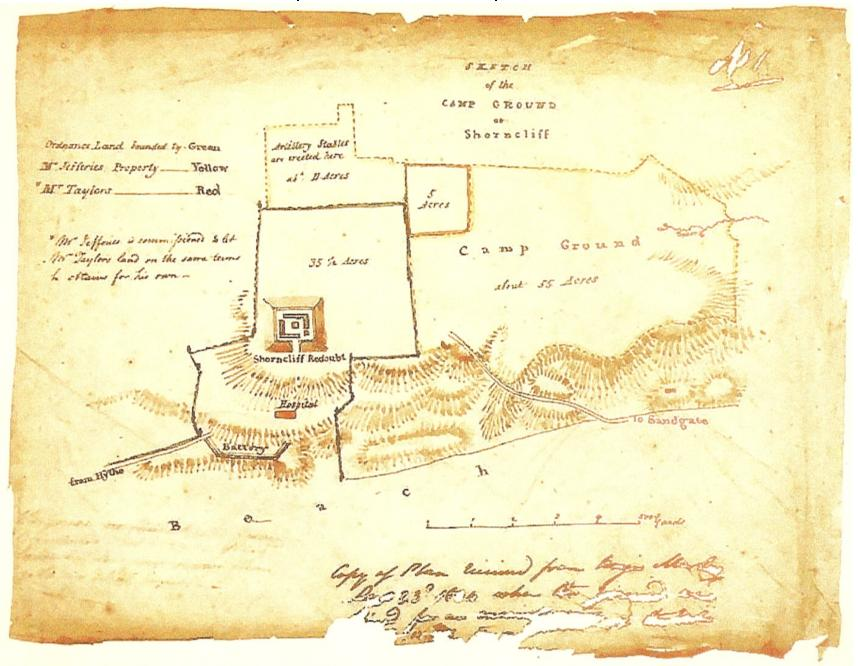
Map of Shorncliffe Camp, 1801, showing the Redoubt of the left and Shorncliffe Army Camp on the right

Shorncliffe Redoubt is a British Napoleonic earthwork fort. The site is approximately 300 feet by 300 feet and is situated on the Kentish Coast in Sandgate, Kent.

== History ==
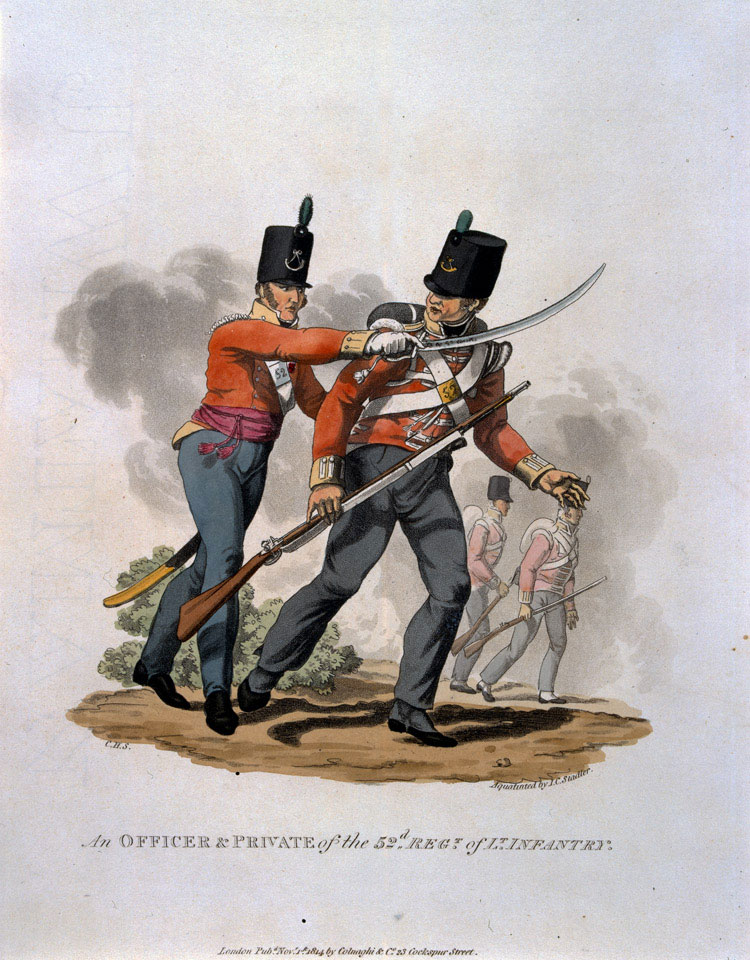
1812 engraving of an officer and private of the 52nd Foot, which was trained at the camp

In 1793, the French Revolution reached its climax when the Revolutionary Government issued orders to execute King Louis XVI and Marie Antoinette. Two weeks later, on 1 February, the French republic declared war on Great Britain, which then braced itself for invasion.

At that time British land-based defences were woefully inadequate as Great Britain had always relied on the Royal Navy for its defence. To prepare for invasion in 1794 British Parliament purchased a large piece of land at Shorncliffe, the obvious place for initial fortifications to be built as it was just 20 miles away from the French coast, so close, in fact, that the locals could see the smoke from the camp fires of Napoleon's waiting army. Later further defences were added to the Kent Coast including the 28-mile-long Royal Military Canal, started in October 1804 and finished in June 1805, which stretches from Cliffend to Seabrook. Also Martello Towers were built between 1805 and 1808 to bolster the defences.

Colonel William Twiss, a military engineer, designed the redoubt. Once built, the site became home to the 43rd (Monmouthshire) Regiment of Foot, 52nd (Oxfordshire) Light Infantry Regiment, the 95th Rifles, and the light infantry brigades who Sir John Moore trained when he was stationed there in 1802.

== Construction ==
There have been many different maps of the Redoubt through the ages as the site was reshaped and redesigned for different functions and changing military tactics. The one aspect that has always remained the same is the earthwork outer walls. The only slight change made to these was on the seaward side during the Victorian era where the wall was lowered so that the Commandant and his wife could look out to sea.

The method of construction of the earthwork walls was totally different from that of earlier earthworks. In earlier walls, the earth was merely dug out and piled so that the wall would be formed (Figure 1). This would lead to the topsoil being at the bottom and the stonier substrate being at the top. This method of construction was optimal before the widespread use of cannon. The design of the Shorncliffe walls was different, and showed careful forethought and engineering (Figure 2). The turf was lifted and put to one side, followed by the topsoil. The stony substrate was then used to create the core of the wall, and a layer of top soil was placed over it and compacted. Then a further layer of stony substrate was added with another layer of top soil to cover it. It is surmised that the turfs were then placed at the bottom of the mound to create extra stability and to promote growth of the grass for protection from the weather. This method of construction leads to a wall with strong foundations better able to withstand cannon fire than previous earthworks.

The defensive ditches dug around the Redoubt were about 5 metres deep. With the earthen ramparts beyond, the Redoubt was well defended.

Some maps show heavily fortified magazines, but archaeological digs have failed to find them. It turns out that the maps were more guidelines for the construction of a much larger star fort which was never built due to the change of infantry tactics brought forward by Colonel Coote Manningham and Sir John Moore.

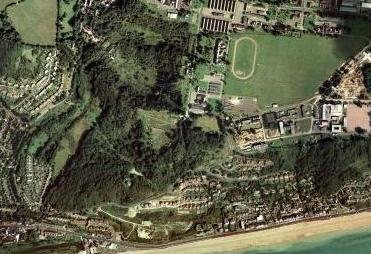
Aerial photograph of Shorncliffe.

Shorncliffe Army Camp remains nearby and is still in use. The Redoubt itself has fallen into a state of disrepair.

== In popular culture ==
- Al Johnson made a recording of The Shorncliffe Camp Song which was originally sung by the recruits at Shorncliffe during World War I. It was called Down in Shorncliffe Camp and sung to the tune of "Back Home in Tennessee" written by W.M. Jerome & Walter Donaldson, 1915.
- Shorncliffe is also mentioned several times in the Sharpe novels of Bernard Cornwell as it was the base of the 95th Regiment of Foot to which fictional soldier Richard Sharpe belonged.
- The popular Channel 4 archaeology program Time Team featured a dig conducted on the site. The programme was first screened on 1 May 2007.
