= Rowley (surname) =

Rowley is an English-language surname. Notable people with the surname include:

== A ==
- Alec Rowley (1892–1958), English composer
- Alex Rowley (born 1963), Scottish politician
- Allan Rowley (1922–2014), British Army officer, Foreign Office diplomat and Secret Intelligence Service (MI6) controller
- Amy Rowley, a deaf student in the 1982 United States Supreme Court case Board of Education of the Hendrick Hudson Central School District v. Rowley
- Arthur Rowley (1926–2002), English footballer
- Arthur Rowley (footballer, born 1870) (1870–?), English footballer

== B ==
- Bartholomew Rowley (1764–1811), British naval officer
- Beth Rowley (born 1981), English singer-songwriter
- Bill Rowley (1865–1934), English footballer
- Bill Rowley (rugby league) (1889–?), Australian rugby league footballer

== C ==
- Charles Rowley (disambiguation), several people
- Chris Rowley (born 1954), American baseball pitcher
- Christopher Rowley (born 1948), American science fiction and fantasy writer
- Clotworthy Rowley of Mount Campbell (c. 1731–1805), Anglo-Irish barrister and Member of Parliament in the Irish Parliament
- Clotworthy Rowley, 1st Baron Langford (1763–1825), Irish peer
- Coleen Rowley (born 1954), American former FBI agent and whistleblower
- Cynthia Rowley (born 1968), American fashion designer

== D ==
- Danielle Rowley (born 1990), Scottish politician
- Dave Rowley, 21st century American politician
- David Rowley (footballer) (born 1990), Malaysian footballer
- Dick Rowley (1904–1984), Irish international footballer

== E ==
- Elizabeth Rowley, Canadian politician and writer

== F ==
- Francis Rowley (1835–1862), Australian cricketer
- Francis H. Rowley (1852–1954), American Baptist minister, animal welfare campaigner and hymn writer

== G ==
- Geoff Rowley (born 1976), English professional skateboarder
- George Rowley (disambiguation), several people
- Gordon Rowley (1921–2019), British botanist and writer
- Gordon Rowley, frontman and bassist for the British rock band Nightwing
- Graham Rowley (cyclist) (born 1940), Australian racing cyclist
- Graham Westbrook Rowley (1912–2003), British Arctic explorer and geographer

== H ==
- H. H. Rowley (1890–1969), English theologian and scholar
- Harrison Rowley (1924–1956), New Zealand rugby union international
- Harry Rowley (1904–1982), English footballer
- Hazel Rowley (1951–2011), British-born Australian writer
- Herbert Rowley (1897–1966), British First World War flying ace and air commodore
- Hercules Rowley (1679–1742), Anglo-Irish politician, father of Hercules Langford Rowley
- Hercules Langford Rowley (c. 1714–1794), Irish politician

== I ==
- Ian Rowley (1926–2009), Scottish-born Australian ornithologist

== J ==
- Jack Rowley (1918–1998), English footballer
- James Joseph Rowley (1908–1992), director of the United States Secret Service under three presidents
- James Rowley (cricketer) (1830–1870), English cricketer
- Janet Rowley (1925–2013), American human geneticist
- Jeff Rowley (born 1979), Australian professional surfer
- Jeremy Rowley (fl. 1999–present), American actor, comedian and writer
- Jodi Rowley, Australian herpetologist and conservationist
- Joe Rowley (born 1999), English footballer
- John Rowley (1907–1996), South African-born English cricketer and colonial governor of Darfur
- Joshua Rowley (1734–1790), Royal Navy vice-admiral, uncle of Josias Rowley
- Josias Rowley (1765–1842), Anglo-Irish Royal Navy admiral

== K ==
- Katie Rowley Jones, English musical theatre actress
- Keith Rowley (born 1949), former Prime Minister of Trinidad and Tobago
- Kent Rowley (1917–1978), Canadian labour organizer

== L ==
- Laurie Rowley (tennis) (born 1955), American tennis player
- Laurie Rowley (writer) (1941–2009), English comedy writer
- Lee Rowley (born 1980), British politician, former Minister of State for Housing, Planning and Building Safety and former management consultant

== M ==
- Mark Rowley (police officer) (born 1964), Commissioner of the Metropolitan Police in London
- Mark Rowley (actor) (born 1990), Scottish actor
- Mark Rowley (rugby union) (born 1964), Welsh rugby union international

== P ==
- Paul Rowley (born 1975), British rugby league coach and former player
- Peter Rowley (born 1952), New Zealand comic actor and writer

== R ==
- Richard Rowley (disambiguation), several people
- Rosabelle Rowley (1905–2004), American politician
- Rosemarie Rowley (born 1942), Irish poet and ecofeminist

== S ==
- Sally Rowley (1931–2020), American jewelry-maker and civil rights activist
- Samuel Rowley (fl. late 1590s–1617), English dramatist and actor
- Samuel Campbell Rowley (1774–1846), Irish-born Royal Navy rear-admiral
- Sean Rowley, British disc jockey and television and radio presenter
- Sean Rowley (singer), lead singer of the American electronic/synthpop band Cause and Effect
- Stan Rowley (1876–1924), Australian sprinter
- Steven Rowley, author of the 2016 novel Lily and the Octopus

== T ==
- Thomas Rowley (disambiguation), several people
- Trevor Rowley (born 1942), British landscape historian and archaeologist

== W ==
- William Rowley (disambiguation), several people

== Barons and baronets ==
- Various holders of the title Baron Langford
- Various Rowley baronets of Tendring Hall (1786)
- Various Rowley baronets of Hill House (1836)

== See also ==
- Admiral Rowley (disambiguation)
