= Cyril Ridley =

British flying ace

Cyril Burfield Ridley
- Born: 15 January 1895; Esher, Surrey, England
- Died: 17 May 1920 (aged 25); Lindenthal, Cologne, Germany
- Burial place: Südfriedhof, Cologne; 50°53′53″N 6°56′16″E
- Military career
- Allegiance: United Kingdom
- Branch: Royal Navy; Royal Air Force
- Service years: 1916–1920
- Rank: Flight Lieutenant
- Units: No. 1 Squadron RNAS/No. 201 Squadron RAF; No. 12 Squadron RAF
- Conflicts: World War I • Western Front

Flight Lieutenant Cyril Burfield Ridley DSC (15 January 1895 – 17 May 1920) was a British World War I flying ace, who served in the Royal Naval Air Service and the Royal Air Force, before being killed in a flying accident in 1920.

== Early life and aircraft building ==
Cyril Burfield Ridley was born in Esher, Surrey, on 15 January 1895, the son of Douglas and Victoria Ridley. He attended Arundel House School in Surbiton, where he became a keen member of the school's Aero Club. In 1910, when aged only 15 he designed and built a man-carrying Chanute-type biplane glider, with a wingspan of 18 feet. Ridley was also a builder of both powered and unpowered model aircraft, taking part in numerous events, often competing against his fellow Arundel Aero Club member Reginald F. Mann, and his teacher and Aero Club secretary, Robert P. Grimmer – who would go on to form their own model aircraft company in 1913, before moving on to a full size aircraft in 1915.

=== Competitions ===
- On 18 June 1910 he took part in the Kite and Model Aeroplane Association's Youths' Longest Flight and Stability Competition, which took place on Wimbledon Common. Mann won, with Ridley's monoplane glider coming third, winning him a bronze medal and five shillings.
- On 7 June 1911 the Kite and Model Aeroplane Association held another competition, at the Sports Ground, Crystal Palace. In the Junior Duration Competition Ridley and Mann were tied for first place after three flights, with Ridley beating Mann in the re-fly by 34 seconds.
- Ten days later, 17 June 1911, the South-Eastern Branch of the Aero Models Association held an open model flying meeting on Mitcham Common, where Ridley won the Distance Race, with a flight of 542 yards (496 m).
- The month following, on 29 July 1911, at the South-Eastern Branch of the Aero Models Association's monthly model flying competition, again on Mitcham Common, Mann took the prize for duration, with Ridley winning the distance prize.
- On 5 July 1911, the Kite and Model Aeroplane Association held a competition for the Wakefield Gold Challenge Cup, awarded for powered models. Points were awarded for shortest take-off, duration and stability. Ridley came sixth.
- On 12 August 1911, the Kite and Model Aeroplane Association held the second annual competition for the Gamage Silver Challenge Cup at Greenford Bridge, which was won by Ridley's "Ridleyplane No. 60" twin-screw monoplane, with a flight distance of 1,681 feet 10.5 inches (512.64 m).
- On 17 February 1912 the Kite And Model Aeroplane Association held a distance and duration competition for hand-launched models on Wimbledon Common, though none of the four competitors (including Mann) were able to surpass Ridley's records of 560 yards (510 m) and 61 seconds.
- On 8 June 1912, during the second annual contest for the Model Engineer Challenge Cup at the Aviation Ground at Northolt Junction, Ridley was again competing against Mann, as well as Charles Richard Fairey, and though his rubber-powered monoplane did not make the longest flight, Ridley was judged overall winner based on efficiency.
- On 27 July 1912, Ridley took part in the third Gamage Cup competition at Greenford, but came third and thus lost his title to the winner; R. B. C. Noorduyn of the Rotterdam Model Aero Club.

After leaving school Ridley worked for the Sopwith Aviation Company as an aeronautical engineer. While still working at Sopwith's, he learned to fly, and received Royal Aero Club Aviator's Certificate No. 2474 after soloing a Maurice Farman biplane at the Hall School, Hendon, on 20 February 1916.

== First World War ==
On 22 June 1916 Ridley joined the Royal Navy, and was appointed a probationary temporary flight sub-lieutenant, to serve in the Royal Naval Air Service. In early October he was confirmed in his rank, with seniority from 25 June.

Ridley then served with No. 1 Squadron RNAS in northern France, initially flying a Sopwith Triplane. On 29 April 1917 he gained the first of his 11 victories, sharing in the driving down of an Albatros D.III with Flight Sub-Lieutenant Herbert Rowley. He had gained a further three victories; driving down Albatros D.Vs on 17 July and 14 August, and a DFW Type C reconnaissance aircraft on 10 September, before being promoted to flight lieutenant on 1 October 1917. His squadron was then re-equipped with the Sopwith Camel, and on 6 December he gained his fifth aerial victory, driving down an Albatros D.V north of Passchendaele, to become an "ace". He went on to destroy enemy observation balloons on 12 March and 8 April 1918.

On 1 April 1918, with the merging of the Royal Naval Air Service with the Army's Royal Flying Corps to form the Royal Air Force, Ridley's squadron was renamed No. 201 Squadron RAF, and soon after, on 17 April, he was awarded the Distinguished Service Cross. His citation read:

Flight Lieutenant (Acting Flight Commander) C. B. Ridley, Royal Naval Air Service.

"For distinguished services as a pilot and for courage in low-flying expeditions during which he attacked enemy trenches with machine gun fire from a height of 30 ft. On 9 March 1918, he attacked a formation of enemy scouts, selecting one which was attacking one of our machines. The enemy aircraft dived down with a quantity of smoke issuing from it, but appeared to flatten out at 2,000 ft. and disappeared in the mist. He has previously destroyed several enemy machines, and has at all times led his flight with great skill and courage."

Ridley went on to drive down a Pfalz D.III on 2 May, destroy a Fokker Dr.I on 6 May, and drive down another on 30 June. His 11th and final victory occurred on 4 July 1918, with the driving down of a Fokker D.VII near Foucaucourt. On 10 July his aircraft suffered an engine failure over enemy lines, forcing him to land, and he was held as a prisoner of war until after the armistice in November 1918.

Ridley was transferred to the Royal Air Force's unemployed list on 28 February 1919, but was granted an RAF short service commission on 24 October, with the rank of flight lieutenant, and posted to No. 12 Squadron RAF, part of the British Occupation Forces in Germany.

== Death ==
On 17 May 1920 Ridley's Bristol Fighter aircraft (D8059) collided in mid-air with that of Flying Officer John Dartnell de Pencier (H1566) at Lindenthal, Cologne. According to the Berliner Lokal-Anzeiger the two aircraft, both from No. 12 Squadron, crashed from a height of 450 feet (140 m), killing both pilots, while their crewmen survived with slight injuries. Both men are buried side by side in Cologne's Südfriedhof ("Southern Cemetery").
