= Southern Cemetery =

Southern Cemetery may refer to:

== Asia ==
In Eqypt

- The Southern Cemetery of Cairo's City of the Dead

In Israel

- The Southern Cemetery is one of the ancient funerary sites in Achziv, Israel

== Europe ==
In Germany

- Alter Südfriedhof (Old Southern Cemetery), Munich
- Südfriedhof (Cologne)
- Südfriedhof (Leipzig)

In the Netherlands

- Zuiderbegraafplaats (Southern Cemetery), Groningen

In Romania

- Southern Cemetery (Focşani)

In Russia

- Southern Cemetery, Saint Petersburg

In the United Kingdom

- Southern Cemetery, Manchester
- Southern Cemetery, Nottingham

== Oceania ==
In New Zealand

- Dunedin Southern Cemetery
