= Shirley baronets =

Set index for Shirley baronets

There have been three baronetcies created with the surname Shirley, two in the Baronetage of England and one in the Baronetage of Great Britain. As of 2026 the first creation is extant.

- Shirley baronets of Staunton (1611): see Earl Ferrers
- Shirley baronets of Preston (1666)
- Shirley baronets of Oat Hall (1786)
