= Battle of Guadeloupe =

The name Battle of Guadeloupe refers to a number of military operations that took place on or near the French island of Guadeloupe in the Caribbean Sea:

- Siege of Guadeloupe (1703), an unsuccessful English invasion during the War of the Spanish Succession
- Invasion of Guadeloupe (1759), a successful British invasion during the Seven Years' War
- Battle of Guadeloupe (1779), a naval engagement fought off Guadeloupe during the American Revolutionary War
- Invasion of Guadeloupe (1794), a series of British and French invasions during the War of the First Coalition
- Invasion of Guadeloupe (1810), a successful British invasion during the Napoleonic Wars
- Invasion of Guadeloupe (1815), a successful Anglo-Bourbon invasion during the Hundred Days
