= Südfriedhof =

Südfriedhof may refer to:

- Südfriedhof (Leipzig), a cemetery in Leipzig, Germany
- Südfriedhof (Cologne), a cemetery in Cologne, Germany
