= Governor Shirley =

Governor Shirley may refer to:

- Sir Thomas Shirley, 1st Baronet (1727–1800), Governor of the Bahamas from 1768 to 1774, Governor of Dominica from 1774 to 1778, and Governor of the Leeward Islands for two periods between 1781 and 1791
- William Shirley (1694–1771), Governor of the Province of Massachusetts Bay from 1741 to 1749 and from 1753 to 1756, and Governor of the Bahamas from 1760 to 1768
