= Charles Rowley =

Charles Rowley may refer to:

== Baronets ==
- Sir Charles Rowley, 1st Baronet (1770–1845), Royal Navy officer
- Sir Charles Robert Rowley, 4th Baronet (1800–1888), see Rowley baronets
- Sir Charles Samuel Rowley, 6th Baronet (1891–1962), see Rowley baronets
- Sir Charles Rowley, 2nd Baronet (1801–1884), son of Sir Charles Rowley, 1st Baronet
- Sir Charles Robert Rowley, 7th Baronet, 8th Baronet (1926–2008), succeeded as eighth Baronet of Tendring Hall in 1997, see Rowley baronets

== Others ==
- Charles Rowley (socialist) (1839–1933), socialist and councillor of Ancoats
- Charles Rowley (cricketer) (1849–1933), English cricketer
- Charles Rowley (academic) (1906–1985), Australian academic and public servant
