= Sir Frederick Adair Roe, 1st Baronet =

British barrister and magistrate

Roe baronets
- Escutcheon of the Roe baronets of Brundish
- Creation date: 1836
- Status: extinct
- Extinction date: 1866
- Motto: Tramite recta, By a straight path

Sir Frederick Adair Roe, 1st Baronet (19 March 1789 – 20 April 1866) was a British barrister and magistrate who was the Chief Metropolitan Police Magistrate from 1832 to 1839.

== Early life and background ==
He was the youngest son of William Roe, sometime chairman of the Board of Customs, and his wife Susannah Margaret Thomas, daughter of Sir George Thomas, 2nd Baronet of Yapton. His mother's sister Lydia Thomas married in 1783 the army contractor Alexander Adair, who died in 1834 at age 95 leaving a large fortune, some of which came to Roe and real property in which was left in trust, to Roe's putative children.

== Career ==
Roe was educated at Westminster School. He matriculated at Christ Church, Oxford in 1806, where he graduated BA in 1810 and MA in 1812. Roe was called to the Bar at Lincoln's Inn in 1816. He was appointed a police magistrate at Marlborough Street in 1822, and chief magistrate at Bow Street in 1832, retiring on a pension in 1839. He was knighted in 1832 and created a Baronet, of Brundish, in the county of Suffolk, in 1836.

== Retirement ==
With a reported £100,000 from the personal property of the Adair estate, Roe retired from his work as chief magistrate. William Ballantine, who knew him as a family friend, wrote:

He was a tall, handsome, gentlemanly man, who had the reputation of having enjoyed life in many phases. He succeeded to a large fortune, and retired from the bench.

His father, William Ballantine the elder (1778/9–1852), was a magistrate of the River Thames police, and commanded the river police force. He congratulated Roe on his "accession to wealth". Roe replied with a sign "Ah! [...] it has come too late."

== Death and legacy ==
The baronetcy became extinct on Roe's death. His wife Lady Roe survived to 1884. He left property including Dale Park, Beach House, Worthing and a London house at 27 Piccadilly. The major legatee was Sir William Thomas, 5th Baronet, who commanded the royal yacht HMY Victoria and Albert. Paintings and other works of art from Roe's collection were put up for auction in 1867.

== Family ==
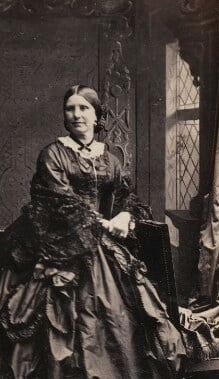
Mary, Lady Roe, 1861 photograph

Roe married in 1831 Mary Ann Knowles, daughter of George Knowles of Emsal (South Elmsall), Yorkshire. They had no children, and on Roe's death the baronetcy became extinct.

Baronetage of the United Kingdom
Preceded by Paulet baronets	Roe baronets of Brundish; 19 March 1836	Succeeded by Rowley baronets
