= Baron Merrivale =

Barony in the Peerage of the United Kingdom

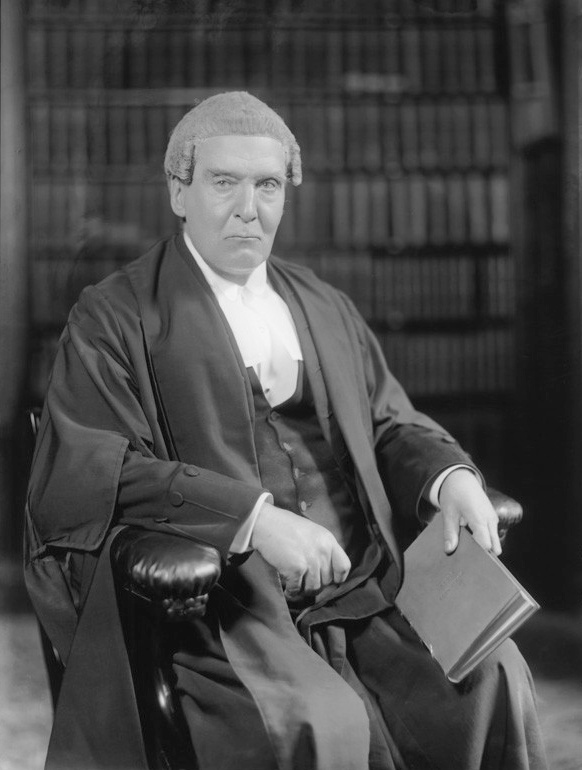
Henry Duke, 1st Baron Merrivale.

Baron Merrivale, of Walkhampton in the County of Devon, is a title in the Peerage of the United Kingdom. It was created on 19 January 1925 for the Conservative politician and judge of the High Court of Justice, Sir Henry Duke. As of 2010 the title is held by his great-grandson, the fourth Baron, who succeeded his father in 2007.

== Barons Merrivale (1925) ==
- Henry Edward Duke, 1st Baron Merrivale (1855–1939)
- Edward Duke, 2nd Baron Merrivale (1883–1951)
- Jack Henry Edmond Duke, 3rd Baron Merrivale (1917–2007)
- Derek John Philip Duke, 4th Baron Merrivale (b. 1948)

The heir apparent is the present holder's son the Hon. Thomas Duke.

== Arms ==
Coat of arms of Baron Merrivale
Crest "Issuant from a chaplet fessewise argent a demi-griffin holding between the claws a fasces erect or." Escutcheon "Argent, an anchor fouled sable between three chaplets, all within a bordure engrailed azure." Supporters "On either side a griffin or, the dexter gorged with a chain sable, pendant therefrom an escutcheon argent charged with a saltire between four castles sable, and the sinister gorged with a like chain suspended therefrom an escutcheon per pale gules and sable, charged with a triple towered castle or." Motto Gradatum Vincimus (We conquer by degrees)
