= Paulet baronets =

Extinct baronetcy in the Baronetage of the United Kingdom

Escutcheon of the Paulet baronets

The Paulet baronetcy, of West Hill Lodge in the County of Southampton, was a title in the Baronetage of the United Kingdom. It was created on 18 March 1836 for the 21-year-old Henry Paulet, in honour of his late father, Vice-Admiral Lord Henry Paulet, younger son of the twelfth Marquess of Winchester. The title became extinct on his death in 1886.

== Paulet baronets, of West Hill Lodge (1836) ==
- Sir Henry Charles Paulet, 1st Baronet (1814–1886)

== See also ==
- Marquess of Winchester

== Notes ==
Baronetage of the United Kingdom
Preceded by Newman baronets	Paulet baronets of West Hill Lodge; 18 March 1836	Succeeded by Roe baronets
