= Mackenzie baronets of Kilcoy (1836) =

Extinct baronetcy

The Mackenzie baronetcy, of Kilcoy in the County of Ross, was created in the Baronetage of the United Kingdom on 15 March 1836 for Colin Mackenzie. He was a descendant of Alexander Mackenzie, son of Sir Colin "Cam" Mackenzie. The 2nd Baronet spent the years 1840 to 1846 in Australia. The title became extinct on his death in 1883.

== Mackenzie baronets, of Kilcoy (1836) ==
- Sir Colin Mackenzie, 1st Baronet (1782–1845)
- Sir Evan Mackenzie, 2nd Baronet (1816–1883)

== Notes ==
Baronetage of the United Kingdom
Preceded by Fairfax baronets	Mackenzie baronets of Kilcoy; 16 March 1836	Succeeded by Barker-Mill baronets
