= Sir William Rowley, 2nd Baronet =

English politician

William Rowley

Member of Parliament for Suffolk
- In office 1812-1830 Serving with Thomas Gooch

Personal details
- Born: 10 February 1761
- Died: 20 October 1832 (aged 71)
- Spouse: Susanna Harland (m. 1785)
- Children: 11
- Parent: Joshua Rowley (father)
- Military career
- Allegiance: United Kingdom
- Branch: Army
- Rank: Lieutenant-colonel
- Units: 96th Foot; 3rd Foot Guards
- Commands: Suffolk Volunteer Cavalry

Sir William Rowley, 2nd Baronet (10 February 1761 – 20 October 1832) of Tendring Hall, Suffolk was an English Member of Parliament and High Sheriff.

== Biography ==
He was the eldest son of Admiral Sir Joshua Rowley, 1st Baronet and educated at Harrow School from 1774. He succeeded his father the Tendring Hall and the baronetcy in 1790.

He joined the British Army and was a lieutenant and captain in the 96th Foot in 1780, transferring to the 3rd Foot Guards from 1782 to 1786. He was afterwards lieutenant-colonel commanding the Suffolk Volunteer Cavalry (in 1798).

He was elected MP for the county of Suffolk, sitting from 1812 to 1830 and was pricked High Sheriff of Suffolk for 1791–92.

He married in 1785, Susanna Edith, the daughter of Admiral Sir Robert Harland, 1st Baronet, of Sproughton, Suffolk. They had 5 sons and 6 daughters. He was succeeded by his eldest son, Vice-Admiral Sir Joshua Ricketts Rowley, 3rd Baronet.

Parliament of the United Kingdom
Preceded by Sir Charles Bunbury, Bt; Sir Thomas Gooch, Bt	Member of Parliament for Suffolk; 1812–1830; With: Thomas Gooch	Succeeded by Sir Henry Bunbury, Bt; Charles Tyrell
Baronetage of Great Britain
Preceded by Joshua Rowley	Baronet (of Tendring Hall); 1790–1832	Succeeded by Joshua Ricketts Rowley
