= Admiral Rowley =

Admiral Rowley may refer to:

- Bartholomew Rowley (1764–1811), British Royal Navy admiral
- Sir Charles Rowley, 1st Baronet (1770–1845), British Royal Navy admiral
- Joshua Rowley (1734–1790), British Royal Navy vice admiral
- Josias Rowley (1765–1842), British Royal Navy admiral
- William Rowley (Royal Navy officer) (c. 1690–1768), British Royal Navy admiral

== See also ==
- Rafe Grenville Rowley-Conwy (1875–1951), British Royal Navy rear admiral
