= Richard Dean (civil servant) =

British customs official (1772–1850)

Richard Betenson Dean (born Richard Betenson Brietzcke; 29 December 1772 − 1 July 1850) was a British civil servant. Dean's family had a history of work in the civil service. His Polish grandfather settled in England and became a confidant to the Duke of Grafton, while Dean's father worked in the Secretary of State's office for most of his life. Following an education at Oxford University, he was called to the bar in 1808, but became a customs commissioner two years later. He served as chairman of the English Board of Customs from 1819; when that Board was merged with its Scottish equivalent in 1823, he took over as chairman of the new Customs Board for the United Kingdom. Despite complements on his work, elements of the press and Parliament became critical of the commissioners' competence in the 1840s. Dean defended their work, but pressure mounted, likely prompting his retirement in 1846; he died at his London residence four years later.

== Early life ==
Richard Betenson Brietzcke was born on 29 December 1772, one of four children of Charles Brietzcke (1738–1795), of London, and his wife Catherine (d. 1830), daughter of Richard Ware (d. 1756), a bookseller of Ludgate. Charles was employed in the Secretary of State's office for most of his life, entering the service in 1756 and rising to become Under Secretary; his diary has since been transcribed by Elma Hailey and published in the journal Notes and Queries. Charles' father was Daniel Brietzcke, who came to England from Poland and became a civil servant and confidant to Charles FitzRoy, 2nd Duke of Grafton; Daniel's wife, and Brietzcke's grandmother, was Elizabeth Deane, who was Under Housekeeper at Somerset House.

Richard Brietzcke was educated at Charterhouse School from 1784 to 1790 and then admitted to Christ Church, Oxford, matriculating in 1790 and graduating with a Bachelor of Arts degree in 1794, before proceeding to a Master of Arts degree in 1796. After commencing his studies at Oxford, he was admitted to Lincoln's Inn in 1792 and was called to the Bar in 1808. He adopted Dean as his surname in 1801.

== Career and later life ==
Dean was appointed a Commissioner of Customs for England and Wales in 1810, after Sir Alexander Munro's post on the Board was vacated. At that time, William Roe was Chairman of the Customs Board, and he was joined in 1813 by Francis Fownes Luttrell; both men retired in 1819 and Dean became chairman, with Snowdon Barne as his Deputy. (Note: Arrowsmith (1974), p. 53 states he became Chair in 1823, but he shown as having been appointed on 12 January 1819 in "Return of the names of all persons appointed to the Office of chairman of the board of Customs or chairman of the board of Inland Revenue, since the year 1800", House of Commons Papers, vol. lxi (1878), p. 161. The Royal Kalendar for 1820 shows him as chairman then (see The Royal Kalendar, 1820, p. 245). The Royal Kalendar, 1819, p. 245 shows Roe and Luttrell as joint Chairmen and they were the previous chairmen listed in the return of 1878. In 1823, the Boards of Customs for England and Wales, Scotland and Ireland were merged to create the Board of Customs for the United Kingdom.) During his long tenure as chairman, he was called to answer questions by Parliamentary Select Committees on a number of occasions.

As chairman, Dean has been described as "a remarkable man, extremely clever and industrious, yet eccentric". Nevertheless, the Committee of Inquiry became increasingly critical of the Board and its management during the early 1840s; finding that, of the nine members of the Board, none, except Dean and his deputy, "had done any work worthy the name". In turn, Dean protested to the Committee that their scrutiny of the board should cease; while acknowledging that appointments to it were not meritocratic, he nonetheless defended the men as "gentlemen—men of education". In 1843, The Times published two articles which heavily criticised the Board and its practices; accusing them of "partiality and vindictiveness", the writer also stated that "with the exception of the chairman and vice-chairman, the Commissioners know as much of the affairs passing through their own departments as their own washerwomen." The Board came to understand that the writer was known to the Committee of Inquiry, prompting Dean and his commissioners to protest over what they claimed amounted to libel; however, the Inquiry pressed ahead. In the criticism which followed, several members "retired"; Dean too retired in 1846, and it is possible that he was prompted to leave under these circumstances. He was succeeded by Sir Thomas Fremantle in June 1846.

== Personal life ==
In 1806, he married Sobieskie Owen, fourth daughter of William Mostyn Owen of Woodhouse, Shropshire, and his wife Rebecca Dod, a daughter of Thomas Dod of Edge, Cheshire, (Note: For further details of this family, see J. Burke and J.B. Burke, Genealogical and Heraldic History of the Landed Gentry, 1847, vol. ii, p. 985, and J. Burke, A Genealogical and Heraldic History of the Commoners of Great Britain and Ireland, 1836, vol. iii, p. 551.) and had issue:

- Sobieskie Judith Dean (c. 1807–1828).
- Captain Charles Augustus Brietzcke Dean (1808–1839), who was commissioned into the 71st Highlanders after completing his education at Charterhouse.
- Richard Ryder Brietzcke Dean (1810–1885), who was educated at Christ Church, Oxford, from 1827, receiving a BA in 1831 and proceeding to MA in 1836; he was a barrister-at-law from 1836 and later became a director of the London and North-Western Railway Company.
- The Reverend Edward Brietzcke Dean (died 1878). He was educated at Christ Church, Oxford, matriculating in 1831 and receiving his Bachelor of Arts in 1835. He became a fellow of All Souls College, Oxford, 1836–1855, received a Bachelor of Civil Law in 1838 and a Doctor of Civil Law in 1843.
- Mary Beilby Dean (c. 1817–1887).
- Caroline Laura Dean (born 1821).

Dean lived in Albemarle Street, Middlesex, where he died, on 1 July 1850. His widow, Sobieskie Dean, died, aged 81, on 24 November 1858 and was buried in the parish of St. Marylebone.

Government offices
Preceded by William Roe; Francis Fownes Luttrell	Chairman of the Board of Customs; England and Wales (1819–1823); United Kingdom (1823–1846); 1819–1846	Succeeded by Sir Thomas Fremantle, Bt
