= Shirley baronets of Oat Hall (1786) =

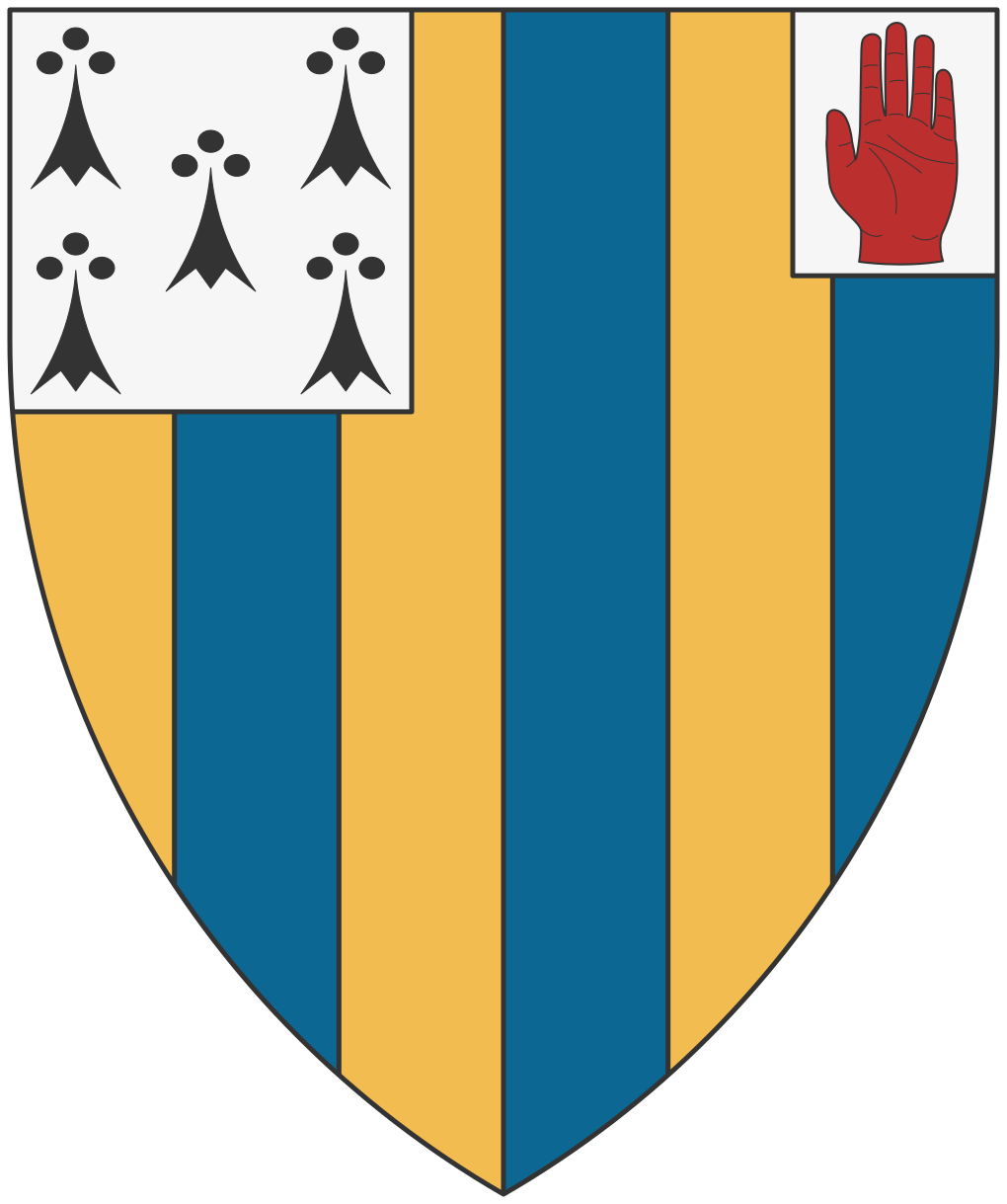
Escutcheon of the Shirleys of Oat Hall

The Shirley baronetcy, of Oat Hall in the County of Sussex, was created in the Baronetage of Great Britain on 27 June 1786 for Thomas Shirley, Governor of the Bahamas, of Dominica and of the Leeward Islands. The title became extinct on the death of the 2nd Baronet in 1815.

== Shirley baronets, of Oat Hall (1786) ==
- Sir Thomas Shirley, 1st Baronet (1727–1800)
- Sir William Warden Shirley, 2nd Baronet (1772–1815), leaving no male heir.

== Notes ==
Baronetage of Great Britain
Preceded by Douglas baronets	Shirley baronets of Oat Hall; 27 June 1786	Succeeded by Green baronets
