= Cameron-Ramsay-Fairfax-Lucy baronets =

Baronetcy in the Baronetage of the United Kingdom

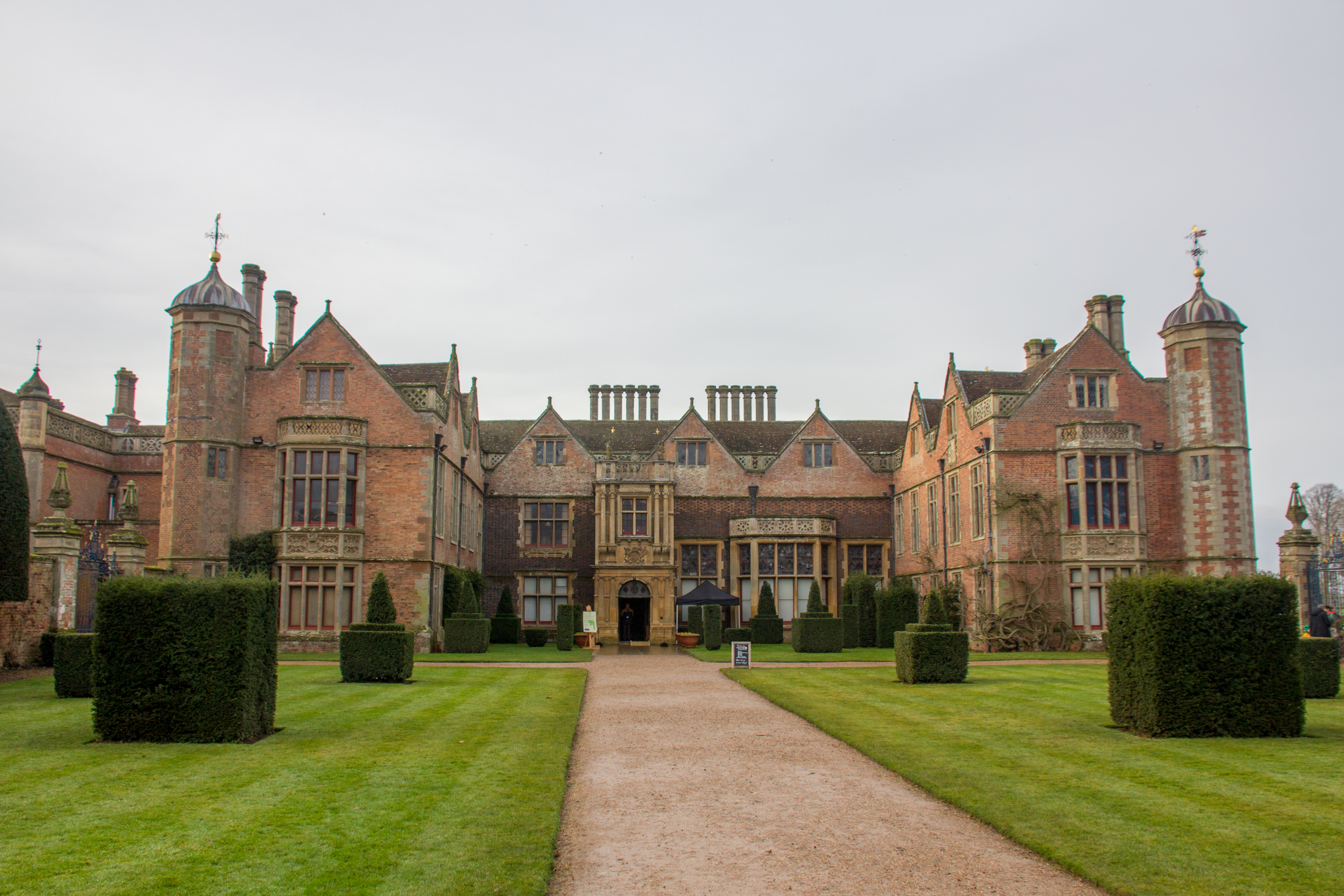
Charlecote Park, the former seat of the Cameron-Ramsay-Fairfax-Lucy family

The Fairfax, later Ramsay-Fairfax, later Cameron-Ramsay-Fairfax-Lucy Baronetcy, of The Holmes in the County of Roxburgh, is a title in the Baronetage of the United Kingdom. It was created on 14 March 1836 for Henry Fairfax, in honour of his father, Vice Admiral Sir William George Fairfax. The second Baronet assumed the additional surname of Ramsay in 1876, which was the maiden name of his maternal grandmother. The third Baronet assumed by Royal Licence the additional surname of Lucy in 1892 after his marriage to Ada Christina Lucy, daughter and heiress of Henry Spencer Lucy. In 1921 he added by Royal licence the additional surname of Cameron, making this quadruple-barrelled name a notable example of the British tradition of concatenated surnames.

The sixth Baronet was the husband of Lucinda Lambton, architectural writer, between 1986 and 1989.

Charlecote Park in the village of Charlecote in Warwickshire came into the Fairfax family through the marriage of the third Baronet to Ada Christina Lucy. The previous owners of Charlecote Park, the Lucy family, had become extinct in the male line. In the 20th century the family fell on harder times and they gave Charlecote Park to the National Trust.

The Lords Fairfax of Cameron are members of another branch of the Fairfax family.

== Fairfax, later Cameron-Ramsay-Fairfax-Lucy baronets, of The Holmes (1836) ==
- Sir Henry Fairfax, 1st Baronet (1790–1860)
- Sir William George Herbert Taylor Ramsay-Fairfax, 2nd Baronet (1831–1902)
- Sir Henry William Cameron-Ramsay-Fairfax-Lucy, 3rd Baronet (1870–1944)
- Sir Henry Montgomerie Cameron-Ramsay-Fairfax-Lucy, MC, 4th Baronet (1896–1965)
- Sir Brian Fulke Cameron-Ramsay-Fairfax-Lucy, 5th Baronet (1898–1974)
- Sir Edmund John William Hugh Cameron-Ramsay-Fairfax-Lucy, 6th Baronet (1945–2020)
- Sir Patrick Samuel Thomas Fulke Ramsay-Fairfax-Lucy, 7th Baronet (1995–)

The heir presumptive is the present holder's younger brother John Frederick Hugh Ramsay-Fairfax-Lucy (1998-).

== See also ==
- Lord Fairfax of Cameron
- Baron Lucy

Baronetage of the United Kingdom
Preceded by Rivett-Carnac baronets	Fairfax baronets of The Holmes; 14 March 1836	Succeeded by Mackenzie baronets
