= Rowley baronets of Tendring Hall (1786) =

Baronetcy

Escutcheon of the Rowley baronets of Tendring Hall

The Rowley baronetcy, of Tendring Hall (Stoke-by-Nayland) in the County of Suffolk, was created in the Baronetage of Great Britain on 27 June 1786 for the naval commander Rear-Admiral Joshua Rowley. He was the son of Admiral of the Fleet Sir William Rowley.

The 2nd Baronet sat as Member of Parliament for Suffolk. The 3rd Baronet was a Vice-Admiral of the Blue. The 6th Baronet was a colonel in the Army.

The 7th Baronet served as Lord-Lieutenant of Suffolk between 1978 and 1994. He died in 1997. In 2002 his kinsman Sir Charles Robert Rowley, 7th Baronet, of Hill House established his claim to the title.

== Rowley baronets, of Tendring Hall (1786) ==
- Sir Joshua Rowley, 1st Baronet (1734–1790)
- Sir William Rowley, 2nd Baronet (1761–1832)
- Vice-Admiral Sir Joshua Ricketts Rowley, 3rd Baronet (c. 1790–1857)
- Sir Charles Robert Rowley, 4th Baronet (1800–1888)
- Sir Joshua Thellusson Rowley, 5th Baronet (1838–1931)
- Sir Charles Samuel Rowley, OBE, 6th Baronet (1891–1962)
- Sir Joshua Francis Rowley, 7th Baronet (1920–1997)

For further succession, see Rowley baronets of Hill House (1836).

== Notes ==
Baronetage of Great Britain
Preceded by Green baronets	Rowley baronets of Tendring Hall; 27 June 1786	Succeeded by Corbet baronets
