= Newman baronets of Stokeley and Mamhead (1836) =

Escutcheon of the Newman baronets of Stokeley and Mamhead

The Newman baronetcy of Stokeley and Mamhead in the County of Devon was created in the Baronetage of the United Kingdom on 17 March 1836 for Robert Newman (1776–1848), Member of Parliament for Exeter from 1818 until 1826 and High Sheriff of Devon in 1827.

== Newman baronets, of Stokeley and Mamhead (1836) ==
- Sir Robert Newman, 1st Baronet (1776–1848)
- Sir Robert Lydston Newman, 2nd Baronet (1821–1854) was killed in action at the Battle of Inkerman in the Crimean War.
- Sir Lydston Newman, 3rd Baronet (1823–1892) was High Sheriff of Devon in 1871.
- Sir Robert Hunt Stapylton Dudley Lydston Newman, 4th Baronet (1871–1945) was created Baron Mamhead in 1931. The fourth Baronet represented Exeter in the House of Commons from 1918 to 1931. The latter year he was created Baron Mamhead, of Exeter in the County of Devon, in the Peerage of the United Kingdom. The peerage became extinct on his death in 1945, while the baronetcy passed to a cousin.
- Sir Ralph Alured Newman, 5th Baronet (1902–1968) reverted to the original baronetcy.
- Sir Geoffrey Robert Newman, 6th Baronet (born 1947) is the holder of the baronetcy as of 2026.

The heir apparent is the present holder's son, Robert Melvil Newman (born 1985).

- Sir Robert William Newman, 1st Baronet (1776—1848)
  - Sir Robert Lydston Newman, 2nd Baronet (1822—1854)
  - Sir Lydston Newman, 3rd Baronet (1823—1892)
    - Robert Hunt Stapylton Dudley Lydston Newman, 1st and last Baron Mamhead, 4th Baronet (1871—1945)
  - Thomas Holdsworth Newman (1825—1894)
    - Robert Lydston Newman (1865—1937)
      - Sir Ralph Alured Newman, 5th Baronet (1902—1968)
        - Sir Geoffrey Robert Newman, 6th Baronet (1947—)
          - (1) Robert Melvil Newman (1985—)
        - (2) Richard Claude Newman (1951–)
          - (3) Henry Ralph Gordon Newman (1997—)
          - (4) Jeremy Robert Lydston Newman (1999—)
          - (5) Crispin George Latimer Newman (2002—)
      - Thomas Lydston Newman (1906—1980)
        - (6) Peter Thomas Lydston Newman (1944—)
          - (7) Rubert Thomas Lydston Newman (1984—)
          - (8) William Alistair Newman (1988—)
    - Ralph Denne Newman (1871—1896)
    - Lionel Ernest Newman (1875—1902)
  - Alured Newman (1831—1904)
    - Edward Devon Newman (1885—1977)
      - John Edward Alured Newman (1915—)

== Notes ==
Baronetage of the United Kingdom
Preceded by Barker-Mill baronets	Newman baronets of Stokeley and Mamhead; 17 March 1836	Succeeded by Paulet baronets
