= 1918 Exeter by-election =

UK parliamentary by-election

The 1918 Exeter by-election was held on 7 May 1918. The by-election was held due to the appointment of the incumbent Conservative MP, Henry Duke, as Lord Justice of Appeal. It was won by the Conservative candidate Sir Robert Newman, who was unopposed due to a War-time electoral pact.
