= William Roe (civil servant) =

English civil servant

William Roe, DL (1748 – 6 March 1826) was an English civil servant. He was a Commissioner for Auditing Public Accounts from 1783 to 1788, and then a Commissioner for Customs until 1819; he was chairman of the Board of Customs for England and Wales from 1805 to 1819.

== Early life and family ==
Born in 1748, (Note: The baptism of William Roe, son of Robert Roe, a mercer, and his wife Esther, took place on 19 April 1748 at the Lewins Mead Chapel in Bristol.) Roe was the only surviving child of Robert Roe (died 1753) of Brinwith, Glamorganshire, and his wife, Hester (died 1760), daughter of William Wraxall of Bristol. (Note: In his will, he called Sir N. William Wraxall, Baronet an "intimate friend and relation".) In 1775, he married Susan Margaret (died 1831), daughter of Sir William Thomas, 2nd Baronet (died 1777), of Yapton Place; they had five children: William Thomas Roe (1776–1834); Louisa Georgiana Roe (1778–1843); George Henry Popham Roe and Edward Wrexhall Roe, who both died in infancy; and Frederick Adair Roe (1789–1866). (Note: In his history of childhood, Anthony Fletcher gives Frederick's year of birth as 1787, but this is contradicted by peerage books, and by the presence of a baptism record for Frederick Adair Roe, son of William and Susanna Margaret Roe, born on 19 March 1789; this is the date used in his obituary in The Gentleman's Magazine.) Roe was close to his eldest son William and thought highly of him.

== Career and later life ==
"A provincial from Bristol" working as a customs official, (Note: Little is otherwise recorded of Roe's early life and career; there is a record of one William Roe, son of the late Robert Roe, of Bristol, being admitted to Lincoln's Inn in 1761.) Roe attracted the attention of Thomas Anguish after writing a series of critical, moralistic articles concerning Lord Shelburne's 1783 peace treaty with America. That year, Anguish co-opted Roe as a Commissioner for Auditing Public Accounts; the commission, which was tasked with investigating government finances and making recommendations, produced influential reports on reforming public expenditure and has been considered a catalyst for the "administrative revolution" in British government which followed in the late 18th and early 19th centuries. Roe himself authored one of the reports (the fifteenth in the series) and was the most active member, after Anguish.

In 1788, Roe was appointed a Commissioner of Customs, replacing John Pownall; seen as an "active administrator", the appointment was made by William Pitt the Younger's government as part of a series of moves to reform the "tangled" finances and inefficiencies of the Board of Customs, a department which (with the Board of Revenue) was responsible for two thirds of the national income. He became chairman of the board in 1805, succeeding Thomas Boone, and served in that office until 1819, chairing the board jointly with Richard Frewin until 1813 and then Francis Fownes Luttrell. He and Luttrell were succeeded as chairmen by Richard Betenson Dean. When he resigned his commission, Roe negotiated to have his son William appointed in his place; for the historian John Ehrman, this highlights the blurred distinctions between administrative appointees and political or social ones, while W. R. Ward argues that such a bargain show how the office was viewed as a "negotiable asset". (Note: William Thomas Roe was educated Christ Church, Oxford, graduating in 1798. He was called to the bar at Lincoln's Inn in 1800 and served as a commissioner of bankrupts from 1804, and then of customs from 1819 to his death in 1834. He also authored A Practical Treatise on the Law of Elections, relating to England, Scotland and Ireland, 2 vols. (London, 1812) and Observations Relative to the Present State of Finance (London, 1828).)

Roe bought the manors of Withdean and Withdean Caycliffe near Brighton in 1794, and was active in improving and managing the estate; he planted a large number of trees on some of the land, establishing Withdean Park. He was also a deputy lieutenant of Sussex.

Roe died on 6 March 1826 at Brighton, aged 78.

== Legacy ==
Roe's notebooks and diaries, recorded from 1775 to 1809, were edited by Charles Thomas-Stanford and published as The Private Memorandums of William Roe (Brighton, 1928).

Roe's eldest son William inherited Withdean, living there and dying in 1834; he had married his cousin, Mary Elizabeth (died 1842), daughter of Daniel Byam Mathew, of Felix Hall. The younger William received an income from an estate called Cochrane's, Old North Sound, in Antigua, which (with its slaves) had been placed in trust for Roe and his wife by Mathew under the terms of their marriage settlement made in 1815; it was sold by the trustees a year later. The younger Roe and his wife had two sons and a daughter; the sons being George Cholmeley Roe, who died shortly after his birth, and William Dering Adair Roe (1816–1838), who died childless; the daughter Eliza Sophia Frances, who became William Roe the younger's sole heir, married Sir Chaloner Ogle, 3rd Baronet. The Withdean estate passed to her and then to her daughter Hebe Emily Moritana Ogle (died 1889) and was sold by Hebe's widowed daughter-in-law, who was administering the estate for Hebe's husband.

The elder William Roe's younger son Frederick was a prominent lawyer, who served as Chief Magistrate of the Bow Street Magistrates; created a baronet in 1836, he died childless in 1866.

Government offices
Preceded by Thomas Boone; Richard Frewin	Chairman, Board of Customs; 1813–1819 with Richard Frewin (1805–1813); Francis Fownes Luttrell (1813–1819)	Succeeded by Richard Betenson Dean
