= John Barker-Mill =

English cricketer

Sir John Barker-Mill, Bt
Personal information
- Full name: John Barker Mill
- Born: 4 December 1803; Wareham, Dorset, England
- Died: 20 February 1860 (aged 56); Mottisfont Abbey, Hampshire, England

Domestic team information
- Years: Team
- 1842: Hampshire

Career statistics
Competition	FC
Matches	1
Runs scored	–
Batting average	–
100s/50s	–/–
Top score	–
Balls bowled	–
Wickets	–
Bowling average	–
5 wickets in innings	–
10 wickets in match	–
Best bowling	–
Catches/stumpings	–/–
- Source: Cricinfo, 5 March 2010

Sir John Barker-Mill, 1st Baronet (4 December 1803 – 20 February 1860) was an English cleric and first-class cricketer.

== Early life ==
He was the son of John Barker of Dorset, born at Wareham. He was educated at Winchester College, and matriculated at Brasenose College, Oxford in 1822. He subsequently matriculated in 1825 at Downing College, Cambridge, where he graduated B.A. in 1828, M.A. in 1831.

Barker was ordained deacon in 1827, by George Henry Law, and priest in 1828 by Edward Copleston. He became a curate at Longstock, Hampshire in 1827, and was vicar there from 1828 to 1835. In 1831 he became vicar too at King's Somborne, also in Hampshire.

== Later life ==
In accordance to the last will and testament of his maternal uncle Sir Charles Mill, 10th Baronet, John Barker took the additional name of Mill by Royal Licence on 8 May 1835. He was created a Baronet "of Mottisfont in the County of Southampton" on 16 March 1836. He also inherited the manor of East Dean, Hampshire. That year he gave up his clerical career.

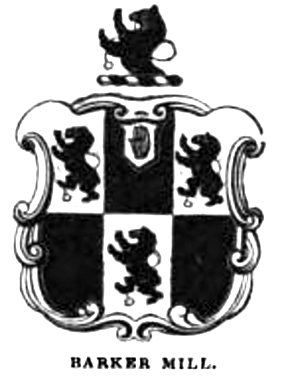
Arms of the Barker-Mill baronets

In 1842 three local gentlemen, Thomas Chamberlayne, Sir Frederick Hervey-Bathurst and Barker-Mill himself, financed the development of the Antelope Ground in Southampton.

Barker-Mill took up racehorse training. In 1845, he as the owner of the winner of the Plymouth, Devon and Cornwall races was presented with a silver vase made by silversmith John Samuel Hunt (1785–1865) as commissioned by Queen Victoria. The vase, known as "Her Majesty's Vase", was rediscovered by the family in 2022. He died at Mottisfont Abbey, Hampshire on 20 February 1860.

== Cricket ==
Barker-Mill made a single first-class appearance for Hampshire against the Marylebone Cricket Club in 1842. In his only first-class match, he was absent hurt in both of Hampshire's innings.

== Marriage ==
John Barker married Jane (c. 1798–1884) daughter of Col. William Swinburne on 14 August 1828 at Keynsham, Somerset. They had no issue. Lady Barker-Mill died aged 85 at Mottisfont Abbey, Hampshire on 2 January 1884. She bequeathed East Dean House to Henry Dugdale Curzon, son of Earl Howe and husband of her relative Eleanor Young Swinburne.

Baronetage of the United Kingdom
New creation	Baronet (of Rumbelows); 1836–1860	Extinct
Preceded by Mackenzie baronets	Barker-Mill baronets of Rumbelows; 16 March 1836	Succeeded by Newman baronets
