= Battle of Guadeloupe (1779) =

1779 naval battle

- Part of the American Revolutionary War and the Anglo-French War (1778–1783)
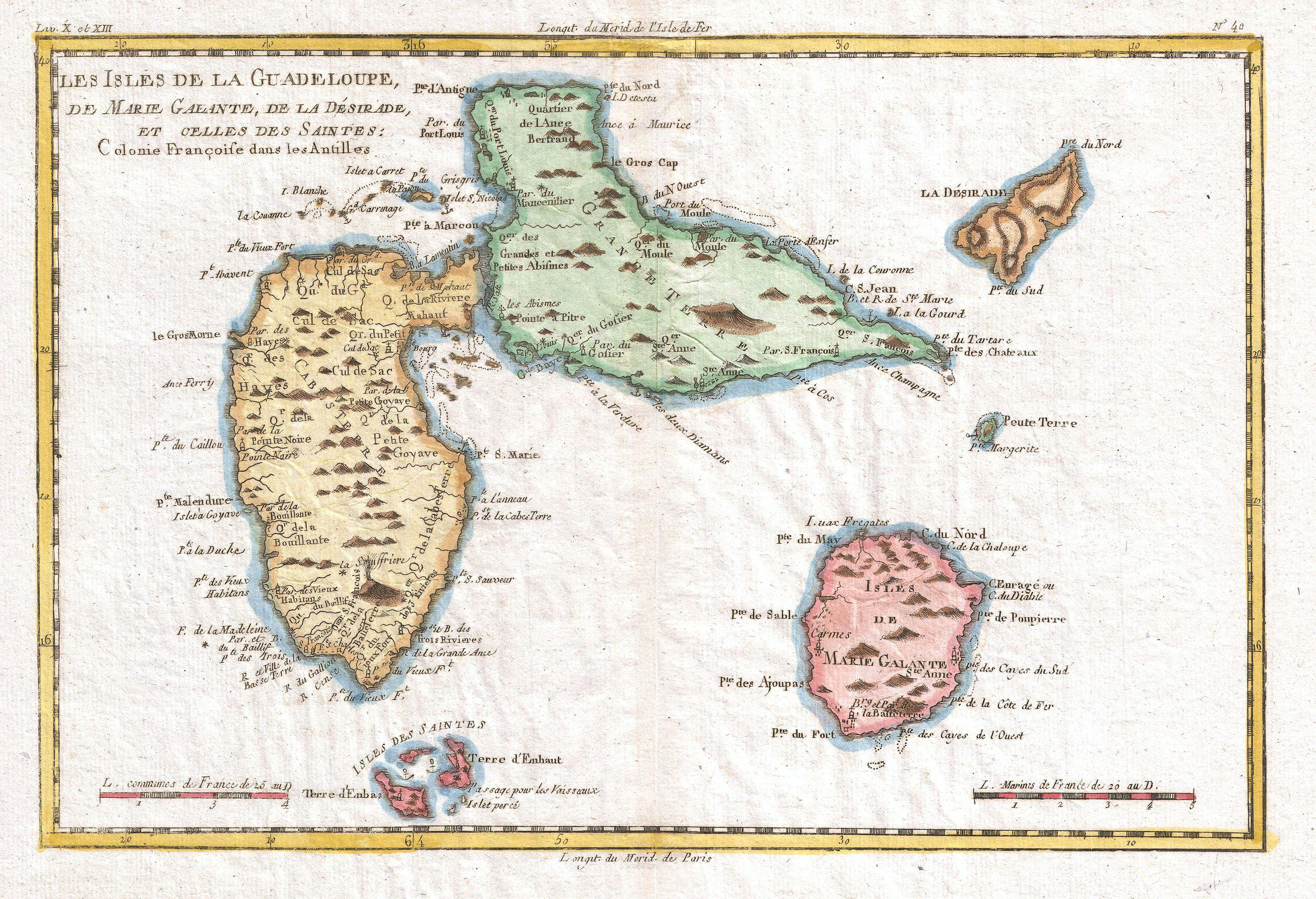
- Map of Guadeloupe, 1780
Date	21–22 December 1779
Location	Off Guadeloupe, West Indies 16°15′54″N 61°33′3.6″W
Result	British victory

Belligerents
Great Britain	France

Commanders and leaders
Joshua Rowley	Unknown

Strength
4 Ships of the line	3 Frigates

Casualties and losses
Light	3 frigates captured

The Battle of Guadeloupe or the Action of 21–22 December 1779 was a naval engagement that took place off the French island of Guadeloupe in the Caribbean during the American Revolutionary War between three Royal Navy ships and three French Navy frigates. The Royal Navy under Joshua Rowley sighted and promptly chased the French frigates, all of which were captured after a brief fight.

== Battle ==
On 21 December 1779, HMS Magnificent along with the 74-gun ships of the line HMS Suffolk, HMS Vengeance, and the 64-gun HMS Stirling Castle under Rear-Admiral Joshua Rowley, sighted the 32-gun French frigates Fortunée and Blanche and the 28-gun Elise, off the French island of Guadeloupe. The French ships had been part of the Comte d Estaing's fleet.

The engagement that followed was one sided - the French ships were in disorder; their crews were weak; and they could not escape the vastly superior British force. The Blanche was defeated and captured on the evening of 21 December. The Fortunée attempted to escape by throwing her quarter-deck guns overboard, but was captured on the early morning of 22 December, an hour before the Elise had struck.

The Blanche and Fortunée were thus added to the British navy.

Rowley then led his squadron to capture a large French convoy, which had sailed from Marseille, off Martinique.

== Sources ==
- Clowes, William Laird (1996). The Royal Navy: A History from the Earliest Times to 1900. Chatham Publishing. ISBN 9781861760104.
- Lavery, Brian (1983). The Ship of the Line - Volume 1: The development of the battlefleet 1650-1850. Conway Maritime Press. ISBN 0-85177-252-8.
- Marley, David (2008). Wars of the Americas: A Chronology of Armed Conflict in the Western Hemisphere. ABC-CLIO. ISBN 978-1598841008.
