= Robert Newman, 1st Baron Mamhead =

British politician

Member of Parliament for Exeter
- In office 1918-1931

Personal details
- Born: 27 October 1871
- Died: 2 November 1945 (aged 74)
- Party: Conservative (1918-1927)

Robert Hunt Stapylton Dudley Lydston Newman, 1st Baron Mamhead (27 October 1871 – 2 November 1945), known as Sir Robert Newman, Bt, between 1892 and 1931, was a British politician. He was also a president of the Church of England Society for the Maintenance of the Faith.

== Background ==
Newman was the son of Sir Lydston Newman, 3rd Baronet. He succeeded his father in the baronetcy in December 1892, aged 23.

== Political career ==
Newman was member of parliament for Exeter between 1918 and 1931. He sat as a Conservative from 1918 to 1927 and as an independent from 1927 to 1931. He was also a deputy lieutenant and justice of the peace for Devon and a member of the Devon County Council. In the 1931 Dissolution Honours he was raised to the peerage as Baron Mamhead, of Exeter in the County of Devon.

== Personal life ==
Lord Mamhead did not marry and the Baronetcy of Stokeley and Mamford passed to his cousin's son Ralph Alured Newman on his death in November 1945, aged 74, but the Barony became extinct.

Parliament of the United Kingdom
Preceded by Henry Duke	Member of Parliament for Exeter; 1918 – 1931	Succeeded by Arthur Conrad Reed
Baronetage of the United Kingdom
Preceded by Lydston Newman	Baronet (of Mamhead); 1892 – 1945	Succeeded by Ralph Alured Newman
Peerage of the United Kingdom
New creation	Baron Mamhead; 1931–1945	Extinct
