= Sir Richard Newman, 1st Baronet =

Sir Richard Newman 1st Baronet MP JP DL (c. 1675 – 1721), of Evercreech Park, was MP for Milborne Port in 1701.

== Background ==
Sir Richard Newman Bt was the eldest son of Richard Newman of Evercreech Park and Fifehead. He was educated at Sherborne, and Pembroke College, Oxford.

== Family life ==
On 1 June 1696 Sir Richard Newman married Frances, daughter of Sir Thomas Samwell, 1st Bt, and had three sons and four daughters.

Baronetage of England
New creation	Baronet (of Fifehead-Magdalen); 1699–1721	Succeeded by Samwell Newman
