= HMS Suffolk (1765) =

Ship of the line of the Royal Navy

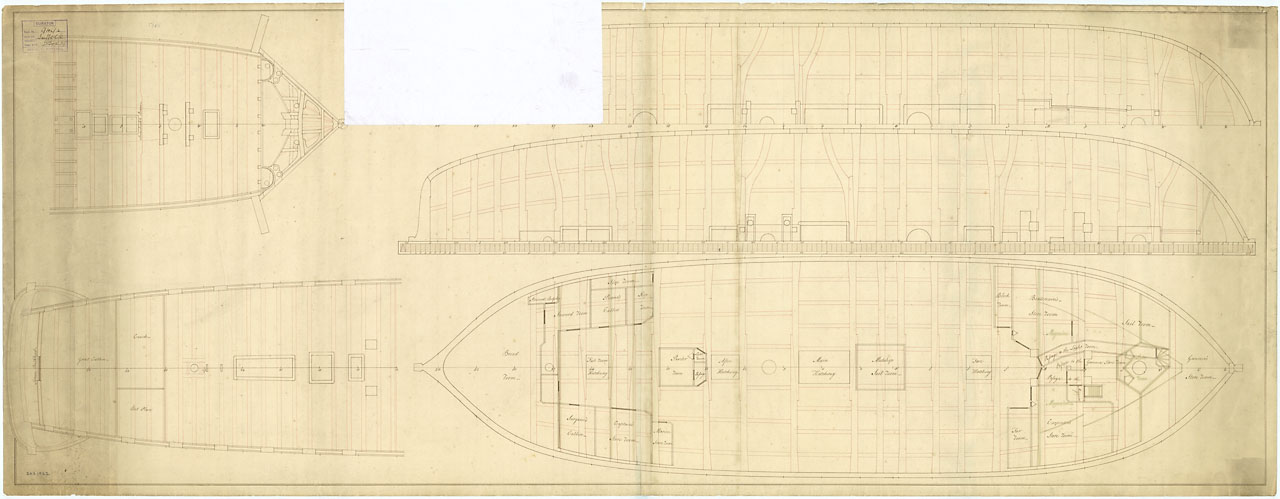
- Suffolk

History

Great Britain
- Name: HMS Suffolk
- Ordered: 8 January 1761
- Builder: Randall, Rotherhithe
- Launched: 22 February 1765
- Fate: Broken up, 1803

General characteristics
- Class & type: 74-gun third rate ship of the line
- Tons burthen: 1616 (bm)
- Length: 168 ft 1 1/2 in (51.2 m) (gundeck)
- Beam: 46 ft 9 5/8 in (14.3 m)
- Depth of hold: 20 ft 2 1/2 in (6.2 m)
- Propulsion: Sails
- Sail plan: Full-rigged ship
- Armament: 74 guns; Gundeck: 28 × 32-pounder guns; Upper gundeck: 28 × 18-pounder guns; QD: 14 × 9-pounder guns; Fc: 4 × 9-pounder guns

HMS Suffolk was a 74-gun third-rate ship of the line of the Royal Navy, launched on 22 February 1765 at Rotherhithe. She was designed by William Bateley, based on the principles of his earlier HMS Fame, and was the only ship built to her draught.

== Service history ==
Suffolk under command of Rear Admiral Joshua Rowley saw action off Guadeloupe island on the night of 21–22 December 1779 when three French frigates, La Fortunée (42 guns), La Blanche (36 guns), and L'Ellis (28 guns) were captured.

On 4 May 1794 Captain Peter Rainier, with Suffolk, a 64-gun ship, and four or five frigates, undertook to escort a convoy to India. In November they arrived at Madras. In July, Suffolk, now under Captain Robert Lambert, HMS Hobart, HMS Centurion and transports, sailed from Madras, joined en route by HMS Diomede, for Ceylon to take Trincomalee and other Dutch settlements on the island.

On 16 February 1796 Rear-admiral Peter Rainier arrived with a squadron, including Suffolk, off Amboyna, on the Dutch controlled Molucca islands and landed troops who were able to take possession without facing any resistance. Then on 7 March, the squadron arrived off Banda-Neira and again landed troops, this time taking possession after facing only a little resistance. The Admiral found in the Treasury at Amboyna, 81,112 Rixdollars, and in store 515,940 lb (234,030 kg) of cloves; in the Treasury at Banda-Neira 66,675 Rixdollars, and 84,777 lb (38,454 kg) of nutmeg, 19,587 lb (8,885 kg) of mace, and merchandise and other stores. Estimates suggest that each of the captains in Rainier's squadron received £15,000 in prize money.

What is perhaps more interesting and of greater long-term significance is that on this voyage, Suffolk was taking part in an experiment under the auspices of the Sick and Hurt Board. At the suggestion of Rear Admiral Gardner, and in defiance of civilian medical opinion the Admiralty implemented a long-term trial of citrus fruit as a remedy for scurvy. Lemon juice was issued on board Suffolk on her twenty-three-week, non-stop voyage to India. The daily ration of two-thirds of an ounce mixed in grog contained just about the minimum daily intake of 10 mg vitamin C. There was no serious outbreak of scurvy. The following year the Admiralty adopted a general issue of lemon juice to the whole fleet.

At Colombo a serious mutiny broke out on Suffolk on 15 January 1798. However, it was suppressed.

On 4 February 1802 Suffolk was at St Helena and expected to sail for England in company with Arran, which too was returning England from the Indies.

She arrived at Sheerness on 4 April and ran aground there. She was refloated with assistance and taken in to Chatham to be paid off.

== Fate ==
Suffolk was broken up in 1803.
