= Henry Duke, 1st Baron Merrivale =

British politician (1855–1939)

The Right Honourable The Lord Merrivale PC
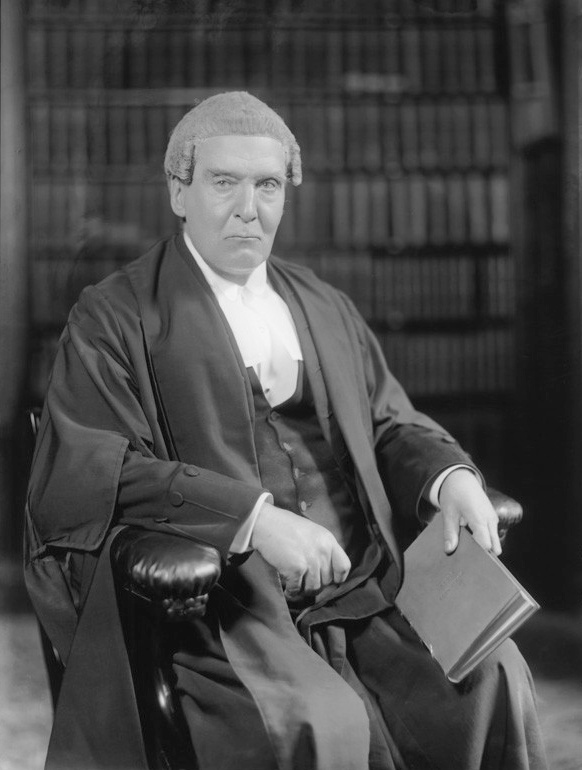
- Duke in 1932

President of the Probate, Divorce and Admiralty Division
- In office 31 October 1919 – 2 October 1933
- Preceded by: The Lord Sterndale
- Succeeded by: The Lord Merriman

Lord Justice of Appeal

Chief Secretary for Ireland
- In office 31 July 1916 – 5 May 1918
- Monarch: George V
- Prime Minister: H. H. Asquith; David Lloyd George
- Preceded by: Augustine Birrell
- Succeeded by: Edward Shortt

Member of Parliament for Exeter
- In office April 1911 – June 1918
- Preceded by: Harold St Maur
- Succeeded by: Robert Newman
- Majority: 1 (0%)
- In office 15 January 1910 – 10 February 1910
- Preceded by: Sir George Kekewich
- Succeeded by: Harold St Maur
- Majority: 26 (0.2%)

Personal details
- Born: Henry Edward Duke; 5 November 1855
- Died: 20 May 1939 (aged 83)
- Party: Conservative
- Spouse: Sarah Shortland (d. 1914)
- Education: None

Henry Edward Duke, 1st Baron Merrivale PC (5 November 1855 – 20 May 1939) was a British judge and Conservative politician. He served as Chief Secretary for Ireland between 1916 and 1918.

== Background and education ==
Duke was the second son of William Edward Duke, a granite merchant of Merrivale, Devon, and his wife Elizabeth Ann (née Lord). From a modest background, he was educated locally and did not attend a public school or university.

== Legal career ==
As a child, Duke worked as a journalist for the local newspaper the Western Morning News, but at age 25 he came to London to cover the House of Commons. While in London he began to study law, and was called to the Bar, Gray's Inn, in 1885. He at first worked on the Western circuit but later established a successful legal practice in London. He was a recorder for Devonport and Plymouth from 1897 to 1900 and for Devonport alone until 1914, and was made a Queen's Counsel in 1899.

== Political career ==
In 1900, Duke was elected to the House of Commons for Plymouth as a Unionist, a seat he held until 1906 when he was defeated. He returned to Parliament in the January 1910 general election as the representative for Exeter. He lost the seat in the December 1910 general election by four votes, but regained it by a single vote after an election petition in April 1911 due to closeness of the result, and held it until 1918 when he resigned for the appointment of Lord Justice of Appeal.

Duke sat on the front opposition bench during the early years of the First World War and was admitted to the Privy Council in 1915. In July 1916, he was appointed by Prime Minister H. H. Asquith to succeed Augustine Birrell as Chief Secretary for Ireland, with a seat in the cabinet, after Birrell had resigned due to the consequences of the Easter Rising. The political situation in Ireland remained strained during Duke's tenure as Chief Secretary, notably over the Conscription Crisis of 1918, and he resigned in May 1918.

== Judicial career ==
After his resignation Duke was knighted and appointed a Lord Justice of Appeal. In 1919, he was made President of the Probate, Divorce and Admiralty Division of the High Court of Justice, a post he held until 1933. A notable case he decided was Balfour v. Balfour. He also dissented at the Court of Appeal level in the famous case of Attorney-General v De Keyser's Royal Hotel Ltd, [1919] 2 Ch. 197, 238–255. On 19 January 1925, he was raised to the peerage as Baron Merrivale, of Walkhampton in the County of Devon.

== Family ==
Lord Merrivale married Sarah, daughter of John Shorland, in 1876. They had one son and a daughter. His wife died in 1914. Merrivale survived her by 25 years and died on 20 May 1939, aged 83. He was succeeded in the barony by his only son, Edward.

== Arms ==
Coat of arms of Henry Duke, 1st Baron Merrivale
Crest "Issuant from a chaplet fessewise argent a demi-griffin holding between the claws a fasces erect or." Escutcheon "Argent, an anchor fouled sable between three chaplets, all within a bordure engrailed azure." Supporters "On either side a griffin or, the dexter gorged with a chain sable, pendant therefrom an escutcheon argent charged with a saltire between four castles sable, and the sinister gorged with a like chain suspended therefrom an escutcheon per pale gules and sable, charged with a triple towered castle or." Motto Gradatum Vincimus (We conquer by degrees)

== Bibliography ==
- Kidd, Charles, Williamson, David (eds.) Debrett's Peerage and Baronetage (1990 ed.) (New York: St Martin's Press, 1990)
- Legg, L.G. Wickham (ed.) The Dictionary of National Biography: 1931-1940. Oxford University Press, 1949.
- Burke's Peerage and Baronetage (106th ed.) (London 2002)
- Leigh Rayment's Peerage Pages
- Leigh Rayment's Historical List of MPs

Parliament of the United Kingdom
Preceded by Sigismund Mendl; Ivor Guest	Member of Parliament for Plymouth; 1900 – 1906; With: Hon. Ivor Guest	Succeeded by Thomas Dobson; Charles Mallet
Preceded by Sir George William Kekewich	Member of Parliament for Exeter; Jan. 1910 – Dec. 1910	Succeeded by Harold St Maur
Preceded by Harold St Maur	Member of Parliament for Exeter; 1911 – 1918	Succeeded by Robert Newman
Political offices
Preceded by Augustine Birrell	Chief Secretary for Ireland; 1916–1918	Succeeded by Edward Shortt
Peerage of the United Kingdom
New creation	Baron Merrivale; 1923–1939	Succeeded by Edward Duke
