= Newman baronets =

Set index for Newman baronets

There have been three baronetcies for persons with the surname Newman, one in the Baronetage of England and two in the Baronetage of the United Kingdom. Two of the creations are extant as of 2026.

- Newman baronets of Fifehead-Magdalen (1699)
- Newman baronets of Stokeley and Mamhead (1836)
- Neumann baronets of Cecil Lodge (1912), later Newman baronets of Cecil Lodge (1912)
