= Green baronets of Marass (1786) =

Escutcheon of the Green baronets of Marass

The Green baronetcy, of Marass in the County of Durham, was created in the Baronetage of Great Britain on 27 June 1786 for William Green, chief engineer during the Great Siege of Gibraltar. The title became extinct on the death of the second Baronet in 1826.

== Green baronets, of Marass (1786) ==
- Sir William Green, 1st Baronet (1725–1811)
- Sir Justly Watson Green, 2nd Baronet (1755–1826)

== Notes ==
Baronetage of Great Britain
Preceded by Shirley baronets	Green baronets of Marass; 27 June 1786	Succeeded by Rowley baronets
