= Newman baronets of Fifehead-Magdalen (1699) =

The Newman baronetcy of Fifehead-Magdalen in the County of Devon was created in the Baronetage of England on 20 December 1699 for Richard Newman (c. 1675–1721). He later represented Milborne Port in the House of Commons.

Sir Samwell Newman, 2nd Baronet (c. 1700–1747) was High Sheriff of Northamptonshire in 1745. The title became extinct on his death in 1747.

== Newman baronets, of Fifehead-Magdalen (1699) ==
- Sir Richard Newman, 1st Baronet (c. 1675–1721)
- Sir Samwell Newman, 2nd Baronet (c. 1700–1747)

Coat of arms of Newman of Fifehead-Magdalen
Notes The portcullis imperially crowned or was added to the arms as an augmentation granted by Charles II. to Colonel Newman, for his distinguished conduct at the battle of Worcester Crest A swallow rising ppr Escutcheon Quarterly, sa. and ar. in the 1st and 4th quarters three mullets of the second, in the centre an inescutcheon gu. charged with a portcullis, imperially crowned, or Motto Lux mea Christus
