= Thomas Rowley =

Thomas Rowley may refer to:

- Thomas Rowley (headmaster) (1797–1877), headmaster of Bridgnorth Grammar School
- Thomas Rowley (poet) (1721–1796), Vermont poet
- Thomas Rowley (runholder) (died 1903), New Zealand member of Parliament for Ellesmere
- Thomas Rowley (settler) (1612–1628), Newfoundland, Canada
- Thomas Rowley (soldier) (1748–1806), Australian soldier and landowner
- Thomas Algeo Rowley (1808–1892), Union Army general in the American Civil War
- Thomas Rowley (skier), American freestyle skier
- the pseudonym of Thomas Chatterton (1752–1770), English poet and forger of pseudo-medieval poetry
