= Richard Rowley =

Richard Rowley may refer to:

- Richard Rowley (writer) (1877–1947), Irish writer
- Richard Rowley (MP) (1812–1887), British politician
- Richard Rowley (film director), documentary filmmaker
- Dick Rowley (Richard William Morris Rowley), Irish footballer
