= Rosabelle Rowley =

American politician (1905–2004)

Member of the Connecticut House of Representatives from Barkhamsted
- In office 1947–1953 Serving with Prosper S. Lavieri
- Preceded by: Prosper S. Lavieri; Alcott C. Rowley
- Succeeded by: Prosper S. Lavieri; Laurence H. Roberts

Personal details
- Born: Rosabelle Raley; October 10, 1905 New Haven, Connecticut, U.S.
- Died: June 7, 2004 (aged 98) Viera, Florida, U.S.
- Party: Republican
- Spouse: Allan Rowley
- Children: 3

Rosabelle Raley Rowley (October 10, 1905 – June 7, 2004) was an American politician who served in the Connecticut House of Representatives from 1947 to 1953, representing the town of Barkhamsted as a Republican.
