= Rowley baronets =

Set index for Rowley baronets

There have been three baronetcies created for members of the Rowley family, one in the Baronetage of Great Britain and two in the Baronetage of the United Kingdom. Two of the creations are extant as of 2026.

- Rowley baronets of Tendring Hall (1786)
- Rowley baronets of the Navy (1813): see Josias Rowley
- Rowley baronets of Hill House (1836)
