= Rowley baronets of Hill House (1836) =

Baronetcy

Escutcheon of the Rowley baronets of Hill House (1836)

The Rowley baronetcy, of Hill House in the County of Berkshire, was created in the Baronetage of the United Kingdom on 21 March 1836 for the naval commander Admiral Charles Rowley. He was the fourth son of the 1st Baronet of the 1786 creation.

The 7th Baronet established his claim to the 1786 baronetcy in 2002. The 8th Baronet, Sir Richard Rowley, is a member of the executive committee of the Standing Council of the Baronetage.

== Rowley baronets, of Hill House (1836) ==
- Admiral Sir Charles Rowley, GCH, GCB, 1st Baronet (1770–1845), youngest son of Joshua Rowley, the 1st Baronet Rowley of Tendring Hall.
- Sir Charles Rowley, 2nd Baronet (1801–1884)
- Sir George Charles Erskine Rowley, 3rd Baronet (1844–1922)
- Sir George Charles Augustus Rowley, 4th Baronet (1869–1924)
- Sir George William Rowley, 5th Baronet (1896–1953)
- Sir William Joshua Rowley, 6th Baronet (1891–1971)
- Sir Charles Robert Rowley, 7th Baronet, 8th Baronet (1926–2008) (succeeded as eighth Baronet of Tendring Hall in 1997)
- Sir Richard Charles Rowley, 8th Baronet, 9th Baronet (born 1959)

The heir apparent to both baronetcies is Joshua Andrew Rowley (born 1989), eldest son of the 8th Baronet.

== Notes ==
Baronetage of the United Kingdom
Preceded by Roe baronets	Rowley baronets of Hill House; 21 March 1836	Succeeded by Graves-Sawle baronets
