= Herbert Rowley =

Herbert Victor Rowley
- Born: 24 October 1897; Crich, Derbyshire, England
- Died: 9 April 1966 (aged 68)
- Military career
- Allegiance: United Kingdom
- Branch: Royal Navy; Royal Air Force
- Service years: 1916–1944
- Rank: Air Commodore
- Units: No. 1 (Naval) Squadron RNAS; No. 25 Squadron RAF; No. 5 Armoured Car Company RAF; No. 84 Squadron RAF; No. 47 Squadron RAF
- Commands: No. 56 Squadron RAF; No. 221 Group RAF
- Conflicts: World War I • Western Front; World War II • Burma campaign

Air Commodore Herbert Victor Rowley (24 October 1897 – 9 April 1966) was a British air officer of the Royal Air Force. He was a World War I flying ace, credited with nine aerial victories while serving in the Royal Naval Air Service, but became a member of the Royal Air Force when the RNAS was consolidated into it. Rowley remained in the RAF post-war, serving through World War II, until retiring in 1944.

== Early life and background ==
Herbert Victor Rowley was born in Crich, Derbyshire, the second son of the Reverend Arthur Rowley and his wife Agnes. By 1901 the family were living in Clarborough, Nottinghamshire, and by 1911 in Kneeton.

== World War I ==
Rowley entered the Royal Navy to serve in the Royal Naval Air Service as a probationary temporary flight sub-lieutenant on 30 April 1916. On 24 June he was posted to RNAS Chingford, and on completion of his basic flight training, was granted Royal Aero Club Aviators Certificate No. 3569 on 24 August. On 23 October he was posted to RNAS Cranwell for further training, and on 4 November to RNAS East Fortune, where he was confirmed in his rank on 7 November.

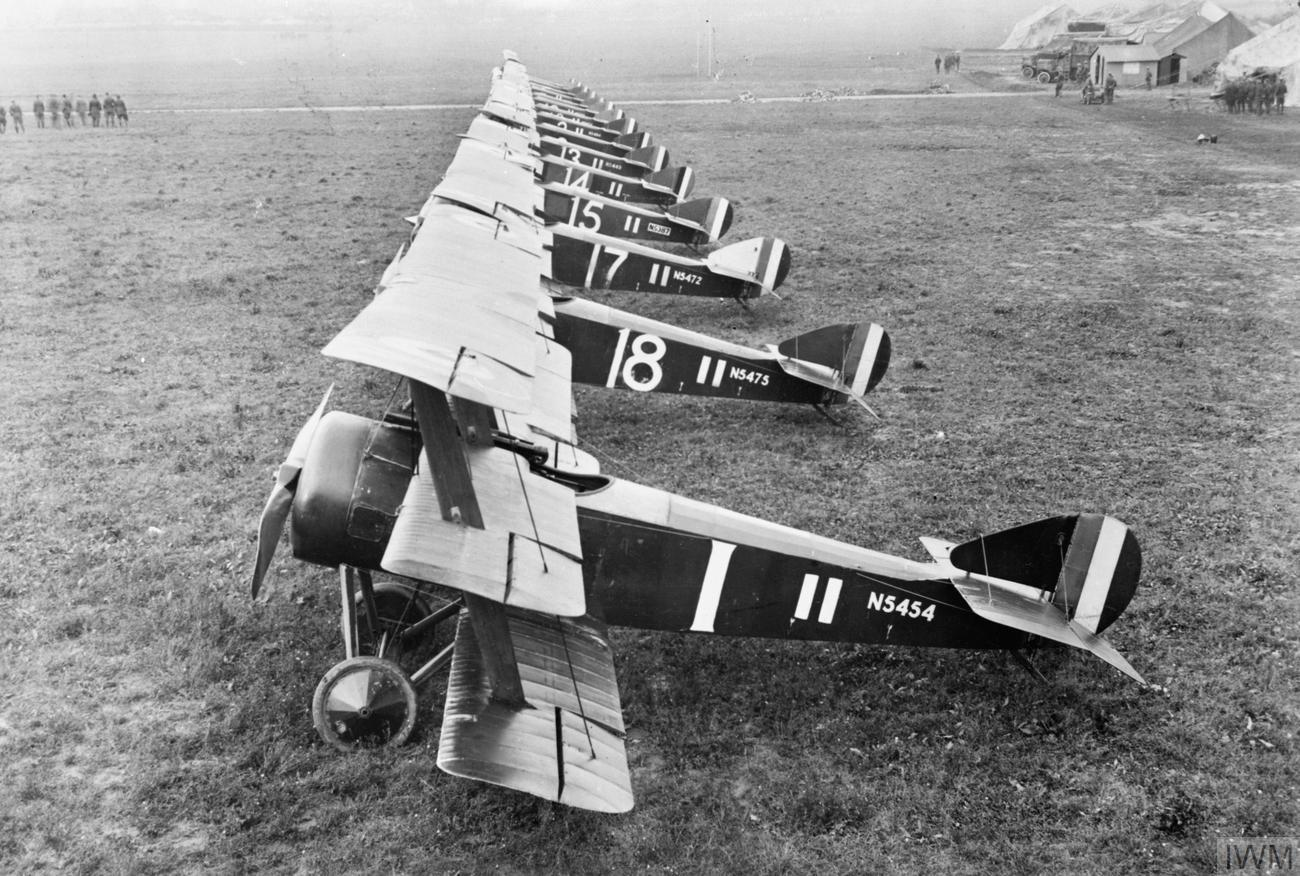
Sopwith Triplanes from No. 1 (Naval) Squadron, RNAS, in France, October 1917.

On 10 January 1917 Rowley was posted to RNAS Dover, then assigned to No. 1 (Naval) Squadron RNAS, based in France, in February to fly the Sopwith Triplane single-seat fighter.

He gained his first aerial victory on 29 April, with two further victories following in July, and another in August. On 31 August he was appointed an acting-flight lieutenant, receiving promotion to flight lieutenant on 1 October, and was appointed an acting-flight commander on 5 October. He gained his fifth victory, which made him an "ace", in November. His squadron was then re-equipped with the Sopwith Camel. Rowley shot down an observation balloon and two enemy aircraft in March 1918, and finally on 1 April, the day that the Royal Naval Air Service was merged with the Army's Royal Flying Corps to form the Royal Air Force, gained his ninth and final victory. He then returned to serve in England on 27 April.

=== List of aerial victories ===
Combat record
No.	Date/Time	Aircraft/ Serial No.	Opponent	Result	Location	Notes
1	29 April 1917 @ 1150 hours	Sopwith Triplane serial number N5425	Albatros D.III	Driven down out of control	Villers-lès-Cagnicourt	Shared with Flight Sub-Lieutenant Cyril Ridley. Rowley was WIA, and forced to land.
2	13 July 1917 @ 1024 hours	Sopwith Triplane s/n N6308	German reconnaissance aircraft	Destroyed	East of Warneton	Shared with Flight Commander Forster Maynard and Flight Sub-Lieutenant Anthony Spence. Rowley also was shot down during the dogfight.
3	17 July 1917 @ 1805 hours	Sopwith Triplane s/n N5373	Albatros D.V	Driven down out of control	Four miles east of Mesen	Shared with Flight Commanders Forster Maynard & H. L. Everitt, and Flight Sub-Lieutenants E. Anthony, Cyril Ridley, Cecil Brock, G. B. G. Scott & Anthony Spence.
4	26 August 1917 @ 0750 hours	Sopwith Triplane s/n N6301	DFW reconnaissance aircraft	Driven down out of control	East of Deulemont	Shared with Flight Sub-Lieutenant Stanley Wallace Rosevear.
5	13 November 1917 @ 1210 hours	Sopwith Triplane s/n N5472	German reconnaissance aircraft	Driven down out of control	Southeast of Nieuwpoort	
6	12 March 1918 @ 1315 hours	Sopwith Camel s/n B6429	Observation balloon	Destroyed	Ypres	Shared with Flight Commander Cyril Ridley.
7	16 March 1918 @ 1145 hours	Sopwith Camel s/n B6429	Albatros D.V	Driven down out of control	Diksmuide	
8	21 March 1918 @ 1550 hours	Sopwith Camel s/n B6429	Albatros D.V	Destroyed	Nieuwpoort	
9	1 April 1918 @ 1300 hours	Sopwith Camel s/n B6429	Albatros D.V	Driven down out of control	Arras–Albert	

== Inter-war career ==
On 1 August 1919 Rowley was granted a permanent commission in the Royal Air Force with the rank of lieutenant (flying officer). In 1920 he served on the Air Staff at the headquarters of No. 3 Group, and was then posted to No. 25 Squadron on 15 August 1921. Between 22 December 1921 and 21 February 1922, he was placed on half-pay (scale B).

On 30 June 1922 he was promoted to flight lieutenant, and served in the Headquarters of Iraq Command until transferred to No. 5 Armoured Car Company on 3 November. From 19 January 1924 he served in No. 84 Squadron in Iraq, then in No. 47 Squadron, based in Egypt, from 17 January 1925.

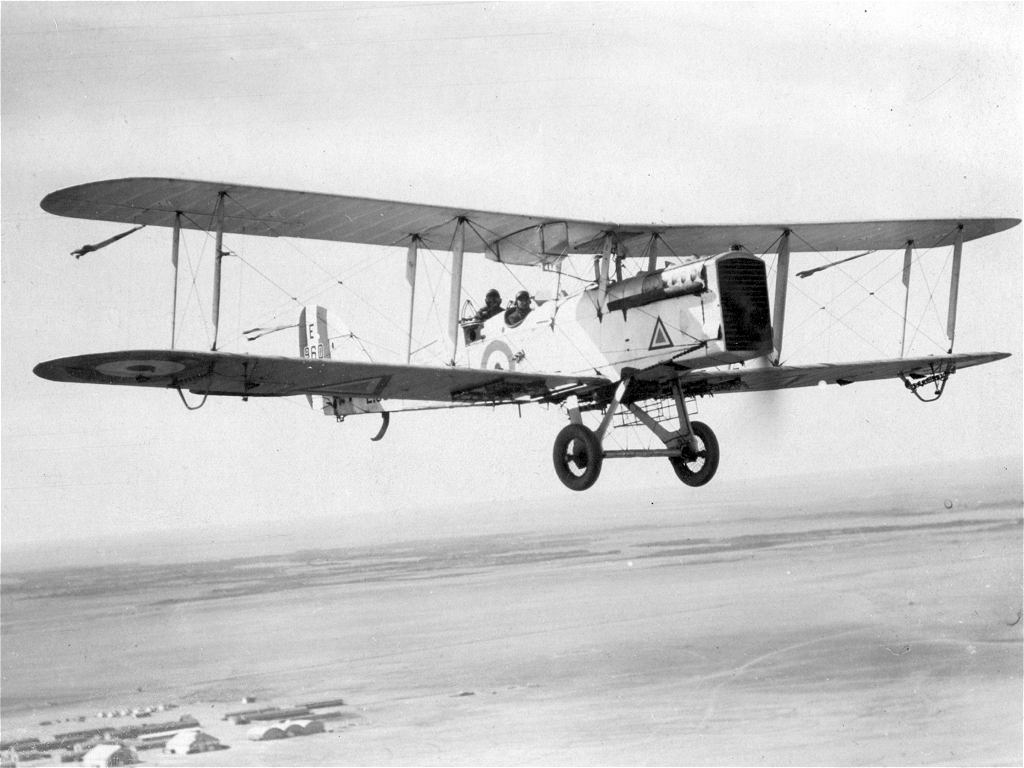
An RAF Airco DH.9A bomber.

There he took part in a pioneering flight of three Airco DH.9A aircraft between Egypt and Nigeria, under the command of Squadron Leader Arthur Coningham. The aircraft left Helwan Aerodrome, Cairo, on 27 October 1925, arriving at Kano, Nigeria, on 1 November, having averaged 500–600 miles (800–970 km) per day, flying via Wadi Halfa, Khartoum and Al-Fashir in Sudan. They then returned to Helwan on 27 October, having flown 5,600 miles (9,000 km) in 23 days. On 1 June 1926 Rowley was posted to the Aeroplane and Armament Experimental Establishment at RAF Martlesham Heath. He was again placed on the half-pay list (scale B) between 10 and 18 January 1927. On 18 July 1927 he was posted to the Cadet College at RAF Cranwell. In July 1930 Rowley took part in the King's Cup Air Race, flying the Gipsy I-engined Blackburn Bluebird IV G-AAUW entered by Mrs. Robert Blackburn. Over the 750-mile (1,210 km) long triangular course between London, Manchester and Newcastle, Rowley averaged 91.2 miles per hour (146.8 km/h), coming 42nd out of 88 competitors.

On 5 November 1930 he was promoted to squadron leader, taking command of No. 56 Squadron, based at RAF North Weald on 15 December. On 27 June 1931 his squadron took part in the 12th Air Force Display held at Hendon Aerodrome, mounting a demonstration involving an mock attack on a long-range gun emplacement by Hawker Harts of No. 33 Squadron and Handley Page Hyderabads from No. 503 Squadron, which was defended by the Armstrong Whitworth Siskins of No. 41 Squadron, commanded by Squadron Leader Patrick Huskinson, and No. 56 Squadron, commanded by Rowley. From 18 January 1932 he attended the Staff College at Andover, and from 17 January 1933 he served on the Air Staff at the Headquarters of Iraq Command. He was posted to the Aeroplane and Armament Experimental Establishment at RAF Martlesham Heath for engineer duties on 30 June 1935.

On 1 January 1937 he was promoted to wing commander, and on 22 February was posted to the Directorate of Operations and Intelligence at the Air Ministry.

== World War II ==
On 28 December 1939 Rowley was appointed an acting-group captain, receiving promotion to the temporary rank on 1 March 1940. From 1 February 1941 he served at the headquarters of No. 12 Group, then from 3 December as Senior Air Staff Officer at the headquarters of No. 10 Group, both part of Fighter Command. On 14 April 1942 he was promoted to group captain (with seniority from 1 March 1940). On 1 November he was appointed a temporary air commodore, and from 1 May 1943 to 17 February 1944 served as Air Officer Commanding, No. 221 (Tactical) Group, a composite group in based in India, part of the Third Tactical Air Force. Rowley retired from the RAF on 26 October 1944, retaining the rank of air commodore.

Air Commodore Rowley died on 9 April 1966.
