= Sir Thomas Shirley, 1st Baronet =

British Army general

Sir Thomas Shirley, 1st Baronet (bapt. 30 December 1727 – 18 February 1800) was a British colonial governor and military officer. He served in the Seven Years' War before being appointed Governor of the Bahamas in 1768. He became Governor of Dominica in 1774 and, from 1781, was Governor of the Leeward Islands. Shirley was awarded a baronetcy in 1786 and was promoted to general in 1798.

== Biography ==
The son of William Shirley, a politically well-connected colonial administrator who served for many years as governor of the Province of Massachusetts Bay. He was baptised on 30 December 1727 at Wivelsfield in Sussex, England. Shirley entered the military, serving in the Louisbourg expedition his father organised in 1745. During the Seven Years' War he served on Menorca and in the 1761 Capture of Belle Île. On 9 May 1758 he was appointed a major in the newly-raised 73rd Regiment of Foot.

Shirley succeeded his father as Governor of the Bahamas in 1768, and was appointed Governor of Dominica in 1774. He was promoted to lieutenant-colonel on 6 September 1777. Shirley remained governor of Dominica until the island was captured in 1778 by French forces during the American War of Independence. He was thereafter (14 April 1781) named Governor of the Leeward Islands, and awarded a baronetcy in 1786 as "Shirley of Oat Hall". He was promoted to lieutenant-general on 18 October 1793 and appointed to the honorary position of colonel of the regiment of the 93rd Regiment of Foot on 16 August 1794. Shirley was promoted to general on 8 January 1798. He died in Bath, England on 18 February 1800 and was buried in Bath Abbey.

== Legacy ==
Fort Shirley in Cabrits National Park, Dominica, was named for him, as was Shirley Heights in Antigua, then-capital of the Leewards. Shirley is often incorrectly described as having been born in Boston, or in 1769. He was, however, born prior to his father's departure for Massachusetts. A portrait of Shirley by George Chalmers is in the collection of the Boston Athenæum.

== See also ==
- Nelson's Dockyard

== Notes ==
Baronetage of Great Britain
New creation	Baronet (of Oat Hall); 1786–1800	Succeeded by William Shirley
