= Shirley baronets of Preston (1666) =

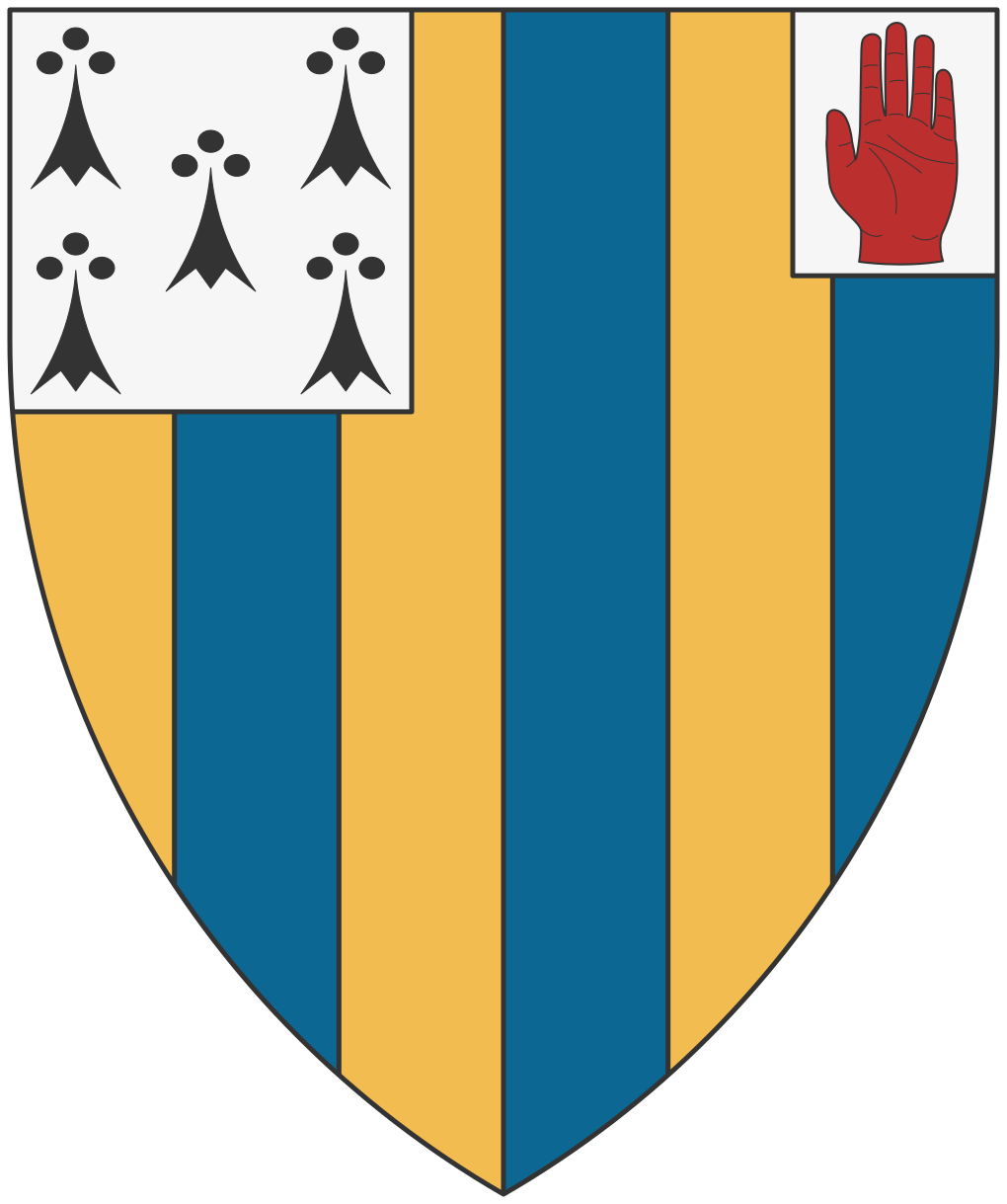
Escutcheon of the Shirleys of Preston

The Shirley baronetcy, of Preston in the County of Sussex, was created in the Baronetage of England on 6 March 1666 for Anthony Shirley, Member of Parliament for Arundel, Sussex and Steyning, in the three Protectorate parliaments.

The title became extinct on the death of the 3rd Baronet in 1705.

== Shirley baronets, of Preston (1666) ==
- Sir Anthony Shirley, 1st Baronet (1624–1683)
- Sir Richard Shirley, 2nd Baronet (c. 1655–1692)
- Sir Richard Shirley, 3rd Baronet (c.1680–1705)

== Notes ==
}

Baronetage of England
Preceded by Swan baronets	Shirley baronets of Preston; 6 March 1666	Succeeded by Diggs baronets
