= Charles Rowley (cricketer) =

English cricketer and army officer

Charles Robert Rowley (29 December 1849 – 5 April 1933) was an English army officer and first-class cricketer.

== Life ==
He was born in Marylebone, the son of Sir Charles Robert Rowley, 4th Baronet, and was educated at Harrow School.

Rowley joined the Grenadier Guards as an ensign in 1869, rising to become captain and lieutenant-colonel in 1879. (The double-rank system, an anachronism after the abolition of the purchase of commissions, was still used in the Guards.) He took part in the Mahdist War as part of the Guards Camel Regiment, leading the 1st Battalion Grenadier Guards. During the Nile Expedition, Lord Wolseley encountered Rowley as he returned to Dongola, and was not impressed: "struck me as of little use—I believe he plays cricket well."

Rowley died in Kensington.

== Cricket career ==
As a cricketer, Rowley was active 1870–1879: he played for Middlesex and Marylebone Cricket Club (MCC).
