= Mann & Grimmer M.1 =

British prototype aircraft

M.1
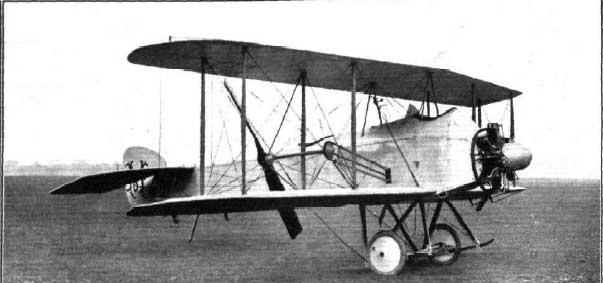

General information
- Type: Fighter aircraft
- National origin: United Kingdom
- Manufacturer: Mann & Grimmer
- Designer: Reginald Frank Mann
- Number built: 1

History
- First flight: 19 February 1915

The Mann & Grimmer M.1 was a British prototype two-seat fighter aircraft of the First World War. It was a single-engined biplane with a radial engine in the aircraft's nose driving two pusher propellers, which was hoped to give a good field of fire for the gunner and high performance. Only one example was built, with no production following.

== Design and development ==
In 1913, the schoolboy Reginald F. Mann, a successful designer and builder of model aircraft, set up the company "Mann & Grimmer" at Surbiton, London with his teacher Robert P. Grimmer to build model aircraft on a commercial scale. The outbreak of the First World War in August 1914 resulted in Mann starting the design of a two-seat machine gun-armed aircraft. Mann wanted his design to combine a good field of fire for the observer's machine gun, as found in pusher configuration aircraft, with the higher performance found in tractor aircraft. To meet these requirements, his design featured a deep conventional fuselage, powered by a single engine mounted in the nose, which drove two 2-bladed pusher propellers that were mounted behind and between the wings, via a long shaft to a gearbox and chain drives to the propellers. The observer sat in the nose of the aircraft, just behind the engine, while the pilot sat in a separate cockpit behind the trailing edge of the wings. It had two-bay wings with a swept leading edge and ailerons on upper and lower wings. It had a fixed conventional landing gear.

The prototype was assembled at Hendon Aerodrome in February 1915, fitted with a 100 horsepower (75 kW) Anzani radial engine. It made its maiden flight on 19 February 1915. It suffered problems with the complicated chain drive, which slowed testing, and proved to be underpowered, reaching a top speed of 70 miles per hour (110 km/h). In order to improve performance, it was fitted with a 125 horsepower (93 kW) Anzani, flying in this form on 29 June 1915. A series of gradual modifications were made to improve performance, with the aircraft eventually reaching a speed of 85 miles per hour (137 km/h). While it was planned that the aircraft would be evaluated by the Royal Flying Corps, this did not occur because the prototype was wrecked in a crash-landing during an attempt on the British altitude record on 16 November 1915, caused by failure of the gearbox.

While Mann designed an improved version, the M.2, which was hoped to reach speeds of 100 miles per hour (160 km/h), a lack of funds resulted in construction of a prototype being abandoned.

== Specifications (125 hp Anzani) ==
Data from War Planes of the First World War: Volume One Fighters

General characteristics

- Crew: 2
- Length: 26 ft 5 in (8.05 m)
- Wingspan: 34 ft 9 in (10.59 m)
- Wing area: 322 sq ft (29.9 m^{2})
- Empty weight: 2,100 lb (953 kg)
- Gross weight: 2,800 lb (1,270 kg)
- Powerplant: 1 × Anzani 10-cylinder radial engine, 125 hp (93 kW)

Performance

- Maximum speed: 85 mph (137 km/h, 74 kn)
- Endurance: 4 hr 30 minutes
- Time to altitude: 3 minutes to 3,000 ft (915 m)

Armament

- Guns: 1× flexibly mounted .303 in Lewis gun
