= Südfriedhof (Cologne) =

Cemetery in Germany

Coordinates: 50°53′53″N 6°56′20″E

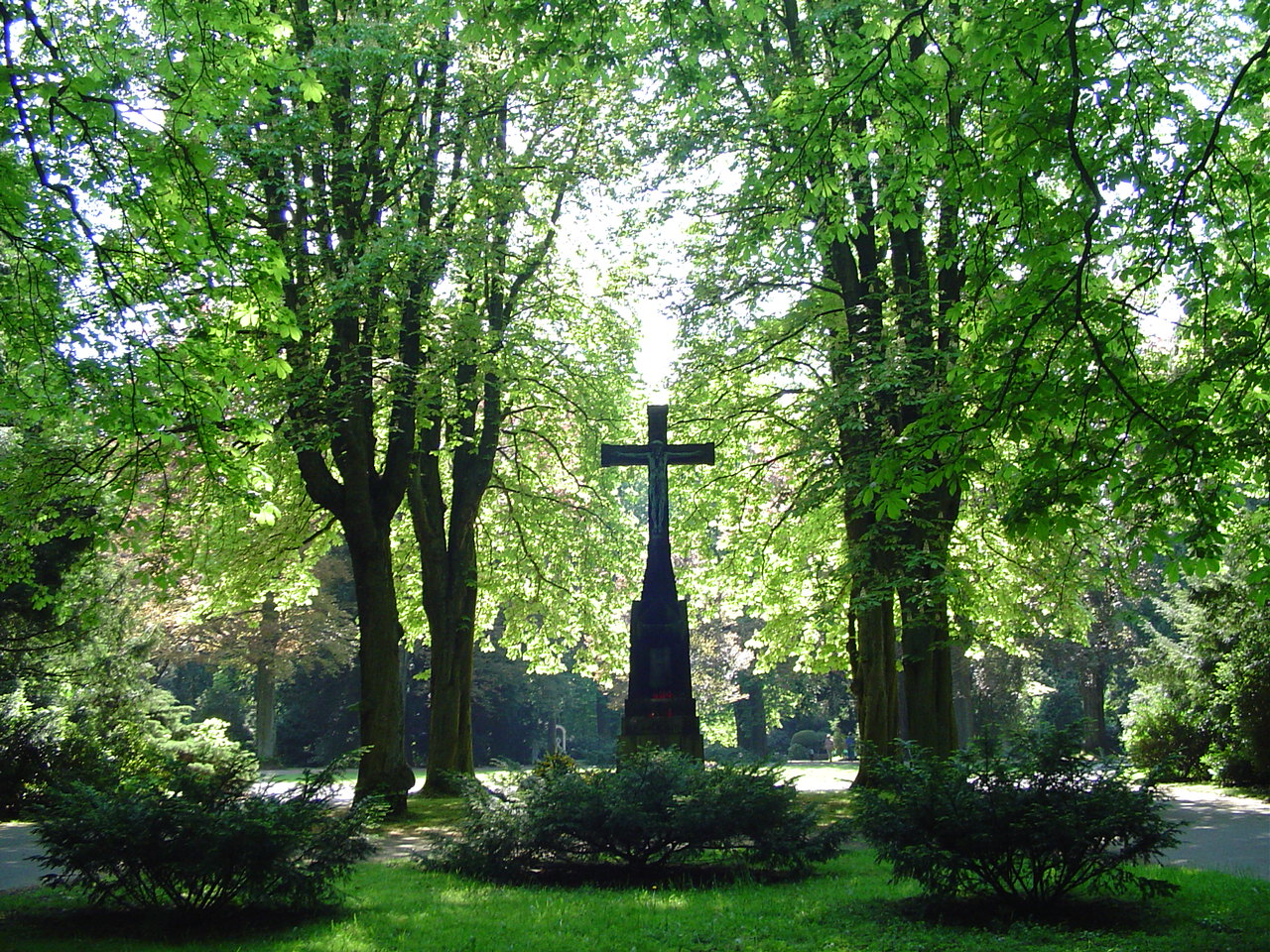
Südfriedhof (South Cemetery), Cologne

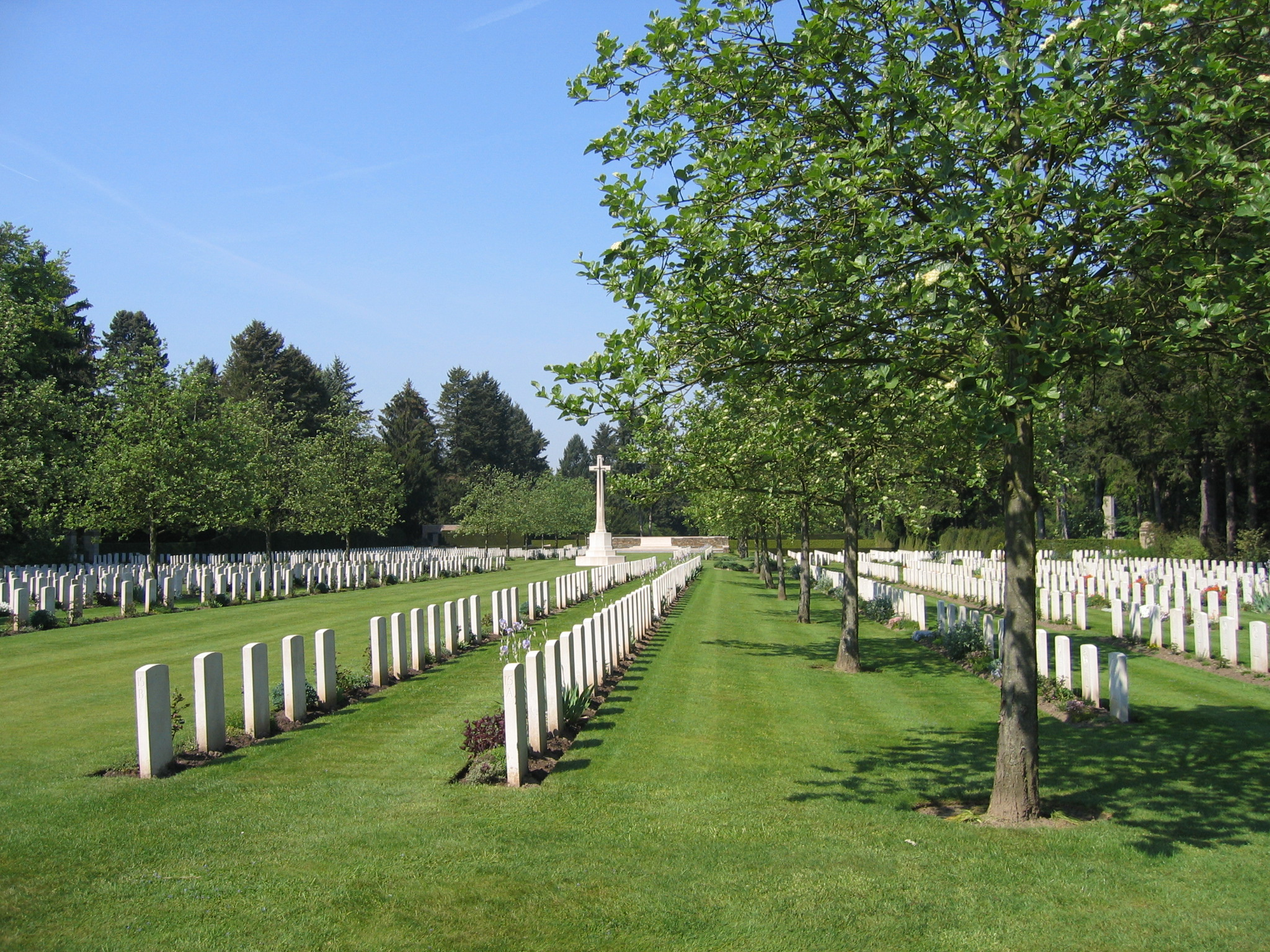
Cologne Commonwealth War Graves Commission Cemetery within Südfriedhof

Südfriedhof is the German name for the South Cemetery in Cologne, Germany. With an area of over 61 hectares, it is the largest cemetery in Cologne.

Südfriedhof also has sections for 2,596 Commonwealth war graves from prisoners of war mainly from the First World War. There are also over 1,900 Italian prisoners of war buried here.

More dramatically, but less acknowledged, the cemetery contains the remains of around 40,000 civilian victims of the bombing of Cologne in the Second World War.

== History ==
Conceived in 1899 and opened in 1901 the cemetery was laid out as a parkland, and was heavily planted to enhance its woodland ambience, to a design by the landscape architect Adolf Kowallek. Kowallek died the year after the cemetery opened and is buried near its entrance.

The cemetery has been extended several times, notably in 1915, during the First World War, to accommodate dead prisoners of war, plus later extension in the 1930s and lastly in 1963.

=== Commonwealth War Graves Cemetery ===
Cologne Southern Cemetery was used for burying British Commonwealth prisoners of war who died in captivity within the area during the First World War, and for those who died while serving in the British army of occupation garrison in the area between 1918 and 1926. From 1922, it also received reburials of British Commonwealth personnel from graveyards in the regions of Hanover, Hessen, Rhineland and Westphalia who became concentrated within what became the present Commonwealth cemetery. In addition, over 130 Commonwealth personnel from the Second World War were buried here, mostly personnel of the allied occupation force. The Commonwealth War Graves Commission also maintain 676 non-war graves and 30 graves of service personnel of other nationalities.

In the shelter building at the entrance of the Commonwealth War Graves Cemetery is the Cologne Memorial, consisting of four plaques listing 25 British personnel who died within Germany but whose graves were not located or who drowned without their bodies being recovered.

== Notable burials ==
- Karl Berbuer composer
- Dominik Bohm architect
- Otto Bongartz architect
- Werner Koj author
- Peter Muller boxer
- Adolf Nocker architect
- Max Scheler philosopher
- Wolfgang Wollner sculptor
