= Joshua Rowley =

Royal Navy officer (1734–1790)

Vice-Admiral Sir Joshua Rowley Bt
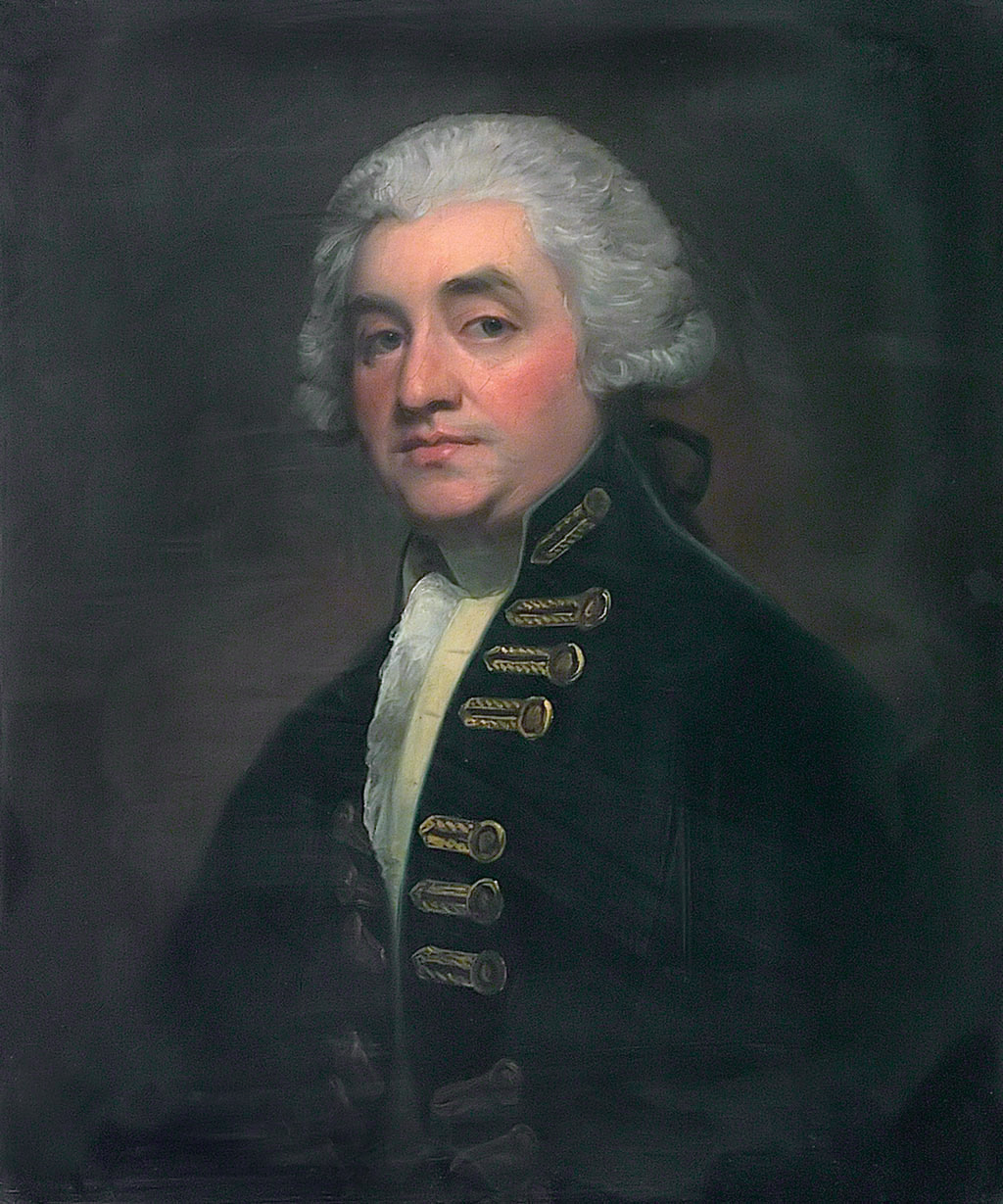
- Portrait by George Romney, c. 1787–1788
- Born: 1 May 1734; Stoke-by-Nayland, Suffolk
- Died: 26 February 1790 (aged 56); Stoke-by-Nayland, Suffolk
- Military career
- Allegiance: Great Britain
- Branch: Royal Navy
- Service years: 1744–1783
- Rank: Vice-Admiral of the White
- Commands: HMS Rye; HMS Ambuscade; HMS Hampshire; HMS Montagu; HMS Superb; HMS Monarch; HMS Suffolk; HMS Conqueror; Jamaica Station
- Conflicts: War of the Austrian Succession; Battle of Toulon (1744); Seven Years' War; Battle of Cartagena (1758); Battle of Saint Cast; Battle of Quiberon Bay; British expedition against Dominica; American War of Independence; Battle of Ushant (1778); Battle of Grenada; Battle of Martinique (1780)

Vice-Admiral of the White Sir Joshua Rowley, 1st Baronet (1 May 1734 – 26 February 1790) was a Royal Navy officer who served in the War of the Austrian Succession, Seven Years' War and American War of Independence. The fourth son of Admiral of the Fleet Sir William Rowley, he served with distinction in a number of battles throughout his career and was highly praised by his contemporaries. Unfortunately whilst his career was often active he did not have the opportunity to command any significant engagements and always followed rather than led. His achievements have therefore been eclipsed by his contemporaries such as Augustus Keppel, Edward Hawke, Richard Howe and George Rodney.

== Early career and the Battle of Toulon ==
He entered the navy and served on his father's flagship HMS Stirling Castle and served at the battle of Toulon, a battle that was exceptionally controversial despite its inconclusive outcome and led Admiral Thomas Mathews and several of his Captains to be dismissed from the Royal Navy. Admiral William Rowley then became Commander-in-Chief of the Mediterranean until 1748. Joshua Rowley remained with his father and was promoted to the rank of lieutenant on 2 July 1747. In 1752 Rowley's name appears once more serving as lieutenant aboard the 44-gun fifth-rate frigate HMS Penzance. On 4 December 1753 he was promoted to post-captain and given command of the sixth-rate HMS Rye of 24-guns. By March 1755 he had been appointed to HMS Ambuscade, a fifth Rate 40-gun frigate that had been captured from the French during the War of the Austrian Succession in 1746. In Ambuscade he was attached to a squadron under Admiral Edward Hawke in the Bay of Biscay. During that short period Hawke's squadron captured over 300 enemy merchantmen. By the time Hawke had replaced the unfortunate Admiral John Byng at Minorca in 1756 Rowley had been moved to the 50-gun HMS Hampshire.

== Seven Years' War ==
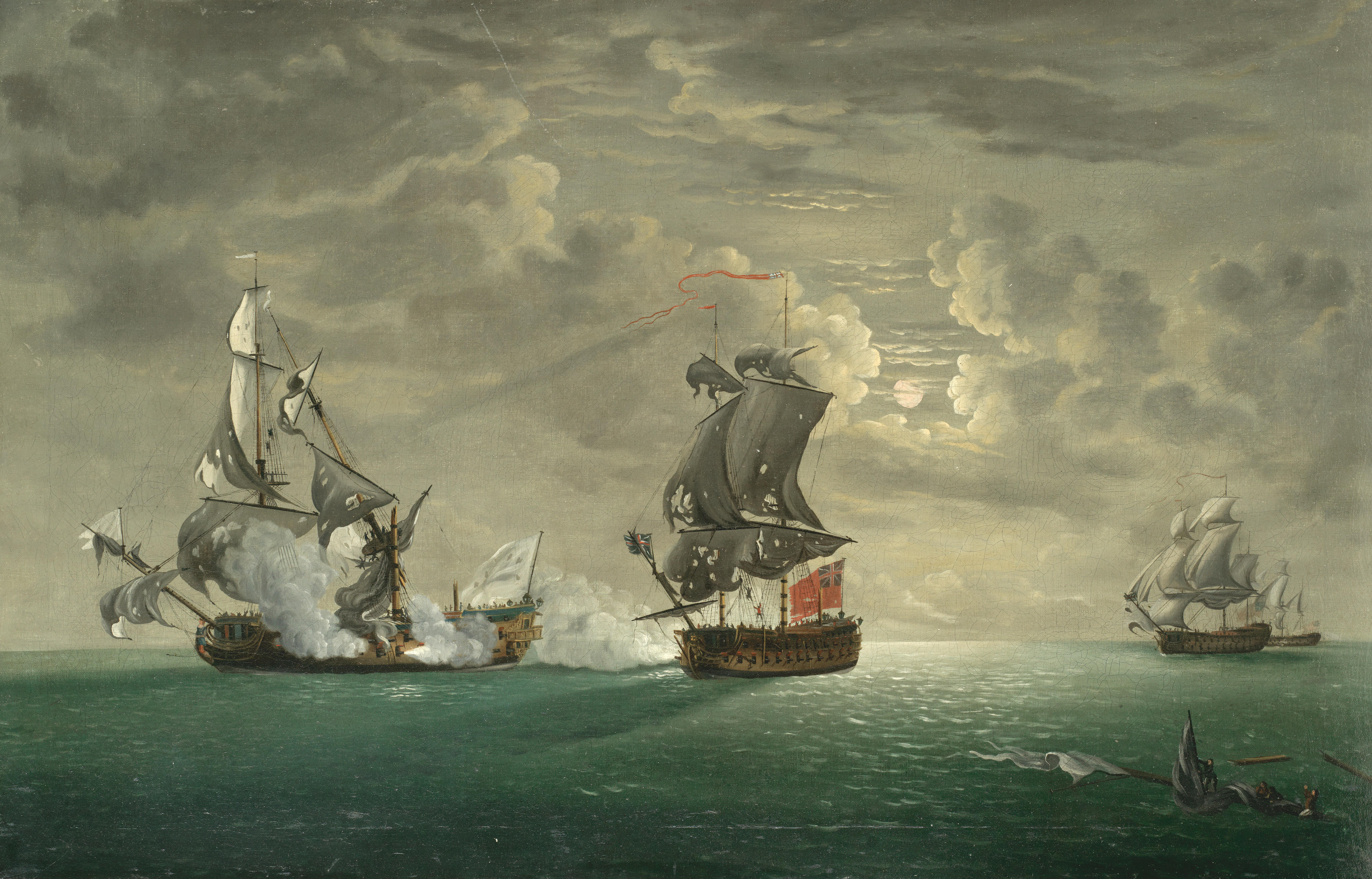
The Battle of Cartagena, which Rowley fought in

By October 1757 Rowley had been given the task of commissioning the 60-gun fourth-rate HMS Montagu. Once launched she joined Admiral Henry Osborn's fleet of 14 ships of the line in the Mediterranean. Osborn was at the time blockading a French squadron under Admiral Jean-François de La Clue-Sabran in Cartagena, preventing them from joining the French fleet off Louisburg. Michel-Ange Duquesne de Menneville had been ordered to break through the British blockade and reinforce La Clue-Sabran and then with superiority of numbers break out of Cartagena and make their way to Louisbourg. Osborn intercepted Duquesne and his three ships of the line and one frigate on 28 February 1758 at the Battle of Cartagena. Osborn's squadron captured two French ships of the line, and under the guns of the Spanish castle the 60-gun Oriflamme was driven ashore by Montagu and Monarch.

== Battle of Saint Cast ==
Rowley joined Admiral Anson's fleet in the channel in 1758 and took part in the fateful expeditions along the coast of France.

The expedition, which took place throughout early September 1758 was a massive undertaking. Britain's Naval forces were under the command of Admiral Lord Anson, seconded by Commodore Howe. Britain's Land forces were commanded by Lieutenant-General Thomas Bligh. These included twenty two ships of the line with nine frigates and Commodore Howe's one third-rate, four fourth-rates, ten frigates, five sloops, two fire-ships, two bomb ketches, one hundred transports, twenty tenders, ten store-ships and ten cutters . The land forces consisted of four infantry brigades and a few hundred Light Dragoon cavalry, totaling over 10,000 soldiers.

Initially the expedition met with considerable success capturing the port of Cherbourg. The British destroyed the port, the docks and the ships harbored there, carrying off or destroying considerable war material and goods. French troops from neighbouring towns and villages began moving on Cherbourg and the British expedition re-embarked to move against Saint-Malo on 5 September but it was found to be too well defended. The weather now turned against the British as well and it was decided it would be safer to re-embark the land forces further west in the bay of Saint Cast near the small village of Saint Cast. The fleet sailed ahead while the army marched overland on 7 September, engaging in skirmishes on the 7, 8 and 9. On 10 September the Coldstream Guards were sent ahead to Saint Cast to collect provisions and convoy them back to the army. Lieutenant-General Bligh with the army camped in Matignon some 3 miles from Saint Cast.

During this time Richelieu, military commander of Brittany, had gathered some 12 infantry battalions. In addition to these forces the French army amounting to 8,000 or 9,000 men, under the field command of Marquis d'Aubigné, were fast marching on Saint Cast from Brest. Bligh broke camp by 3am on the morning of 11 September and reached the beach at Saint Cast before 9am but the embarkation went very slowly. Hardly any soldiers had embarked when the French appeared and began a cannonade of the beach. A great deal of confusion followed and as panic set in among the British, the French forces moved down a covered way to the beach and deployed three brigades into line with a fourth in reserve. The five frigates and the bomb ketches tried to cover the British retreat and their fire disordered and drove back the French line for a while. The French artillery batteries however were well positioned on higher ground and drove off the frigates and sank three landing boats full of soldiers and other landing boats were destroyed on the beach. The rear guard attempted a counter-attack during which the Grenadier Guards broke and routed. According to Fortescue, of the 1400 men that remained in the rear guard 750 officers and men were killed and wounded...the rest of the rear guard were taken prisoner." Captain Rowley was wounded and was left on the beach. Along with captains Maplesden, Paston, and Elphinstone he was taken prisoner on the beach.

With the huge loss of life and military equipment, the battle ended British hopes of an invasion of Brittany during the Seven Years' War. The battle was an embarrassment for both the British Army and Navy.

== Battle of Quiberon Bay ==
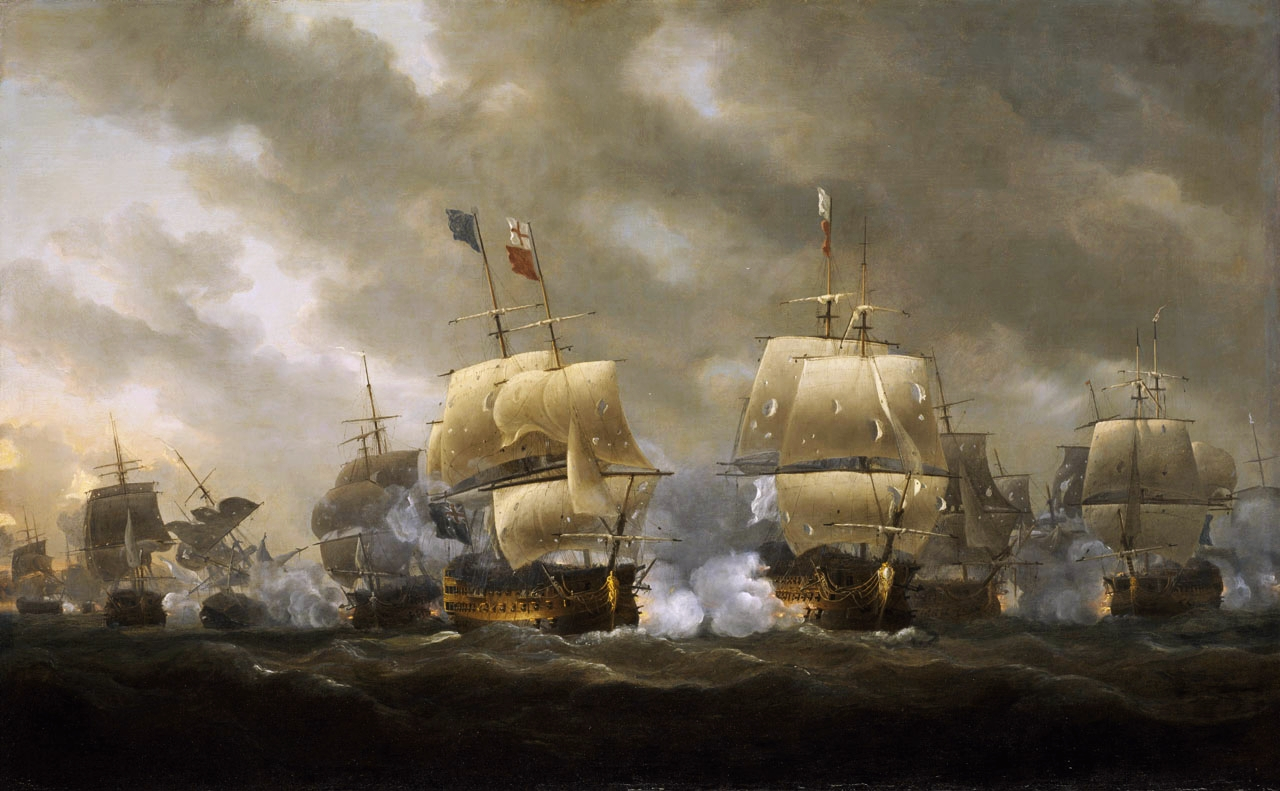
The Battle of Quiberon Bay, Nicholas Pocock, 1812

By late October 1759 Rowley had been exchanged by the French for their own prisoners who were held by the British (a common practise of the time) and was once more in command of the Montagu. He was again assigned to Admiral Hawke’s squadron and was with the fleet with Hawke off Brest and in the Battle of Quiberon Bay. The French had designs to invade Scotland and had been ordered to break through the blockading British ships and collect transports for the invasion. On 20 November, 23 ships of Hawke’s squadron that had been sheltering from the seasonal gales in Torbay caught up with and attacked 21 Ships of the Line under Admiral Conflans in Quiberon bay. The bay itself is infamous due to its clustered and hidden shoals and variable wind and weather. The battle was fought directly through the dangerous shoals and the British lost two ships wrecked on the shoals and the French lost six with another successfully captured. The battle has been described by several later historians as the "Trafalgar" of the Seven Years' War. The risks of taking such a large fleet into the dangerous shoals of the bay with the Atlantic gales beating down upon them separated Hawke from many of his contemporaries and showed not only his daring genius but the confidence that he inspired in his subordinates. The French were equally impressed at the daring and audacity of the British Naval commanders and it took a great many years for them to recover.

== West Indies and Convoy Duty ==
In 1760 he went out with Commodore Sir James Douglas to the West Indies, where he took part in the expedition against Dominica that landed General Rollo and forced the island into capitulation on 7 June after one day of fighting. In November 1760 Rowley moved into the third-rate 74-gun HMS Superb. He accompanied an East India Company convoy in that year and returned to England. In 1762, with two frigates, HMS Gosport, under a young Captain John Jervis, and HMS Danae, in company, he took another convoy of East and West Indian trade to the westward, and successfully protected it from the squadron of Commodore de Ternay. "So highly, however, was his conduct approved, by the East India Company, and by the London West - India merchants, that they presented him with a handsome silver epergne and dish". It was during this period that Rowley took a particular interest in the career of midshipman Erasmus Gower, appointing him to acting lieutenant and recommending to the Admiralty that Gower serve on loan to the Portuguese Navy. Gower's subsequent distinguished career carried all the hallmarks of Rowley's influence. After several years on the beach, in October 1776 Rowley was appointed to the 74-gun HMS Monarch, in which at the beginning of 1778 he convoyed some transports to Gibraltar.

== Battle of Ushant ==
On his return to England he was attached to the fleet under Admiral Keppel whom he had last seen leading the van at the Battle of Quiberon Bay in HMS Torbay. It was with Keppel on 27 July 1778 that Rowley led the van (on the starboard tack) at the First Battle of Ushant. Monarch had two killed and nine wounded. Once more Rowley was involved in a battle that ended ambiguously and yet caused great upheaval and political and naval ramifications. As a consequence of the battle Keppel resigned his command after a court-martial acquitted him. Admiral Hugh Palliser was also court martialled and was heavily criticized leading to his resignation as a member of parliament.

== Battles of Grenada & Gaudeloupe ==
At the end of 1778 Rowley moved into the 74-gun HMS Suffolk and was sent to the West Indies with a commodore's Broad pennant in command of a squadron of seven ships, as a reinforcement to Admiral John Byron, whom he joined at Saint Lucia in February 1779. On 19 March he was promoted to rear-admiral of the blue. On 6 July 1779 Rowley once more led the van division against Admiral d’Estaing. The battle was a draw and did little to change the course of the war that was already moving into its closing stages.

Later that year Rowley captured two French frigates and a sloop-of-war. They were, la Fortunée (42 guns), la Blanche (36 guns), and l'Ellis (28 guns). Rowley also led his squadron to capture of a large French convoy, from Marseilles, off Martinique.

== Rodney and the Battle of Martinique ==
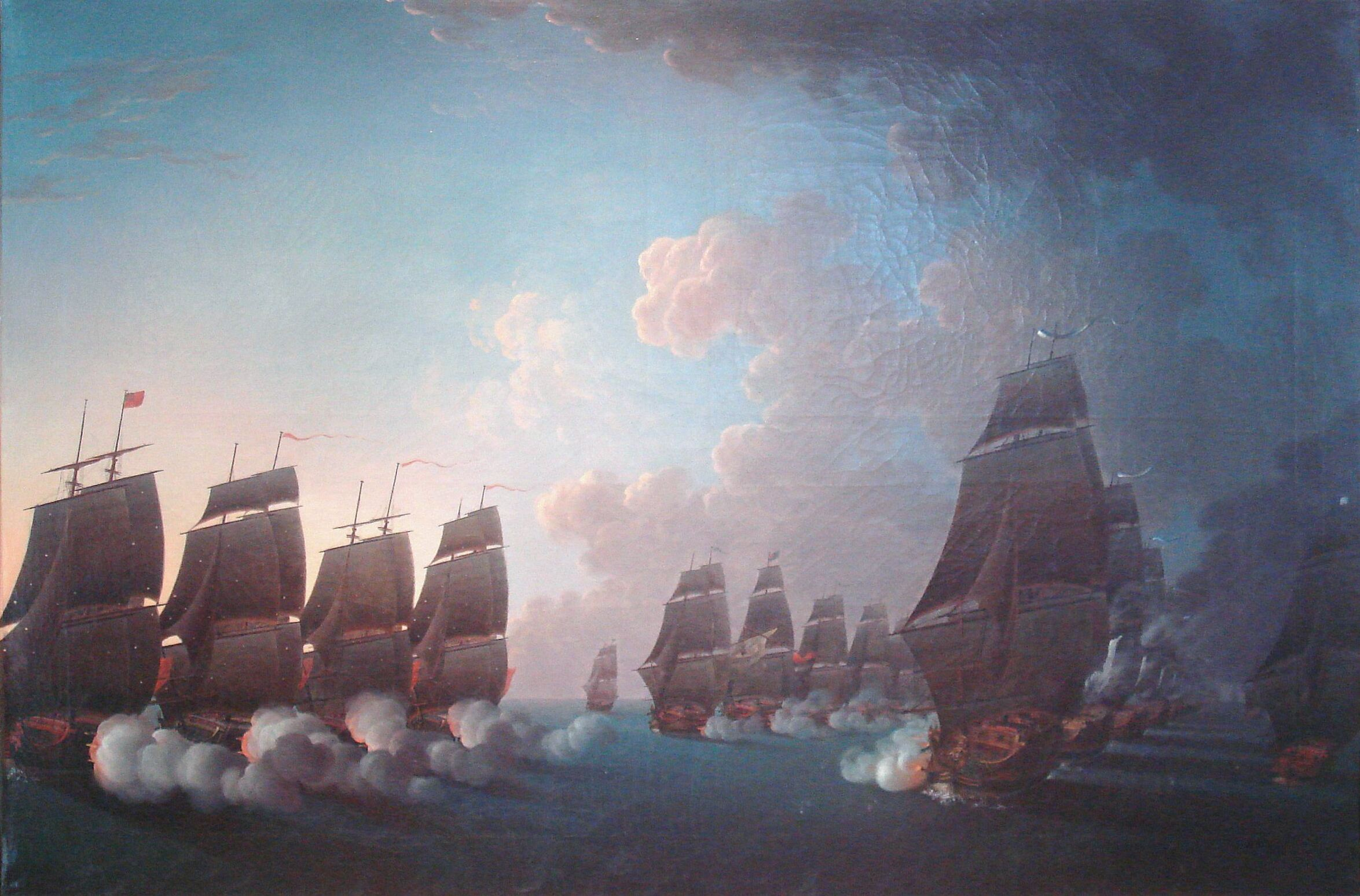
Battle of Martinique 17 April 1780

When Admiral Sir George Rodney arrived from England to command the station, Rowley shifted his flag to the 74-gun HMS Conqueror in which ship he commanded the rear division in the action off Martinique on 17 April against the comte de Guichen and the van in the two further stalemate engagements of 15 and 19 May. The three battles were inconclusive and when the hurricane season arrived de Guichen returned to Europe and Rodney sent Rowley to Jamaica with ten ships of the line to reinforce Sir Peter Parker, as there was an imminent threat to the colony from the Spanish.

== Commander-in-Chief Jamaica ==
In 1782 Rowley succeeded to the command of the Jamaica Station a post which he held until the end of the American War of Independence. Rowley had proved throughout his career that he was both brave and a very capable officer and yet the successes of other commanders of the Jamaica station had set an extraordinary precedent that he could not match in his brief time there. He was also instrumental in corresponding with Henry Christophe of Haiti for the reason of attempting to bring peace to the Kingdom of Haiti. Rowley, later, returned to England in 1783 and was not appointed to another command. On 10 June 1786 he was honoured with a (baronetcy - with the hereditary title of Sir Joshua Rowley, Bt. of Tendring Hall, Suffolk), he was promoted on 24 September 1787 to the rank of Vice-Admiral of the White. He died at his home, Tendring Hall in Suffolk, on 26 February 1790.

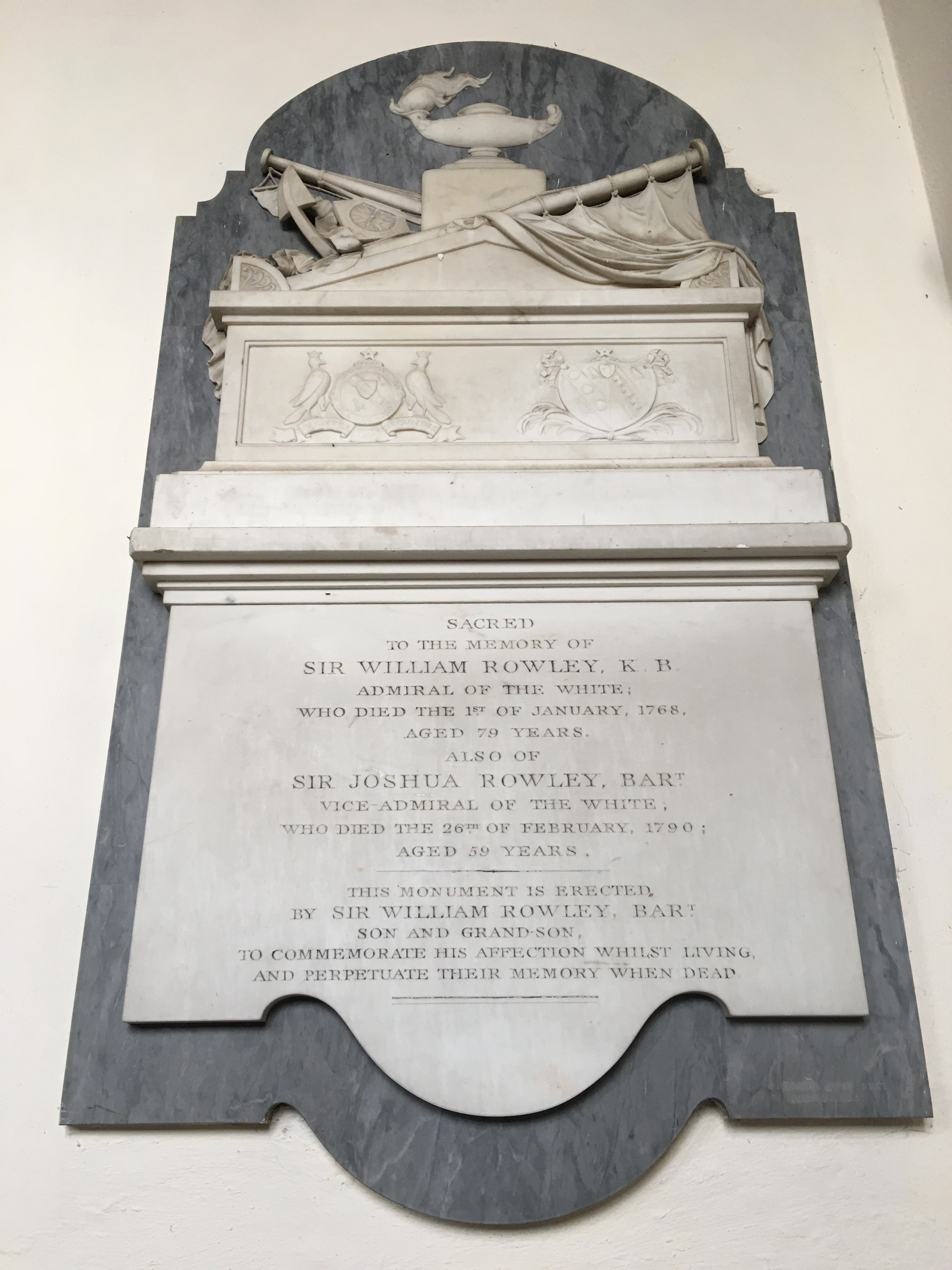
Memorial to Joshua Rowley in St Mary's church, Stoke-by-Nayland, Suffolk

== Family ==
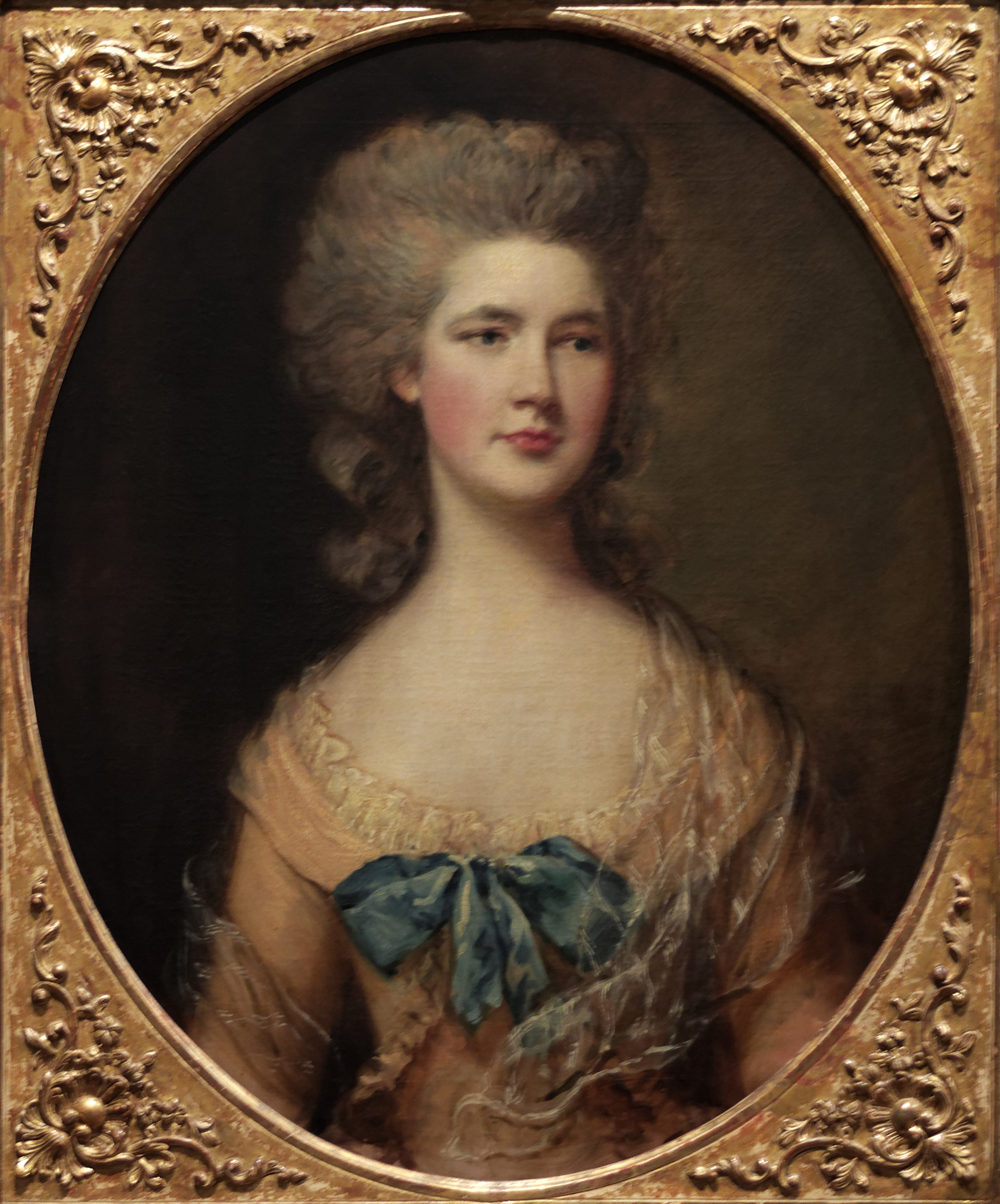
Miss Philadelphia Rowley, Thomas Gainsborough (ca 1783)

Rowley was married in 1759, to Sarah Burton, daughter of Bartholomew Burton, Governor of the Bank of England, and despite his active service the two had a large family:

- Sarah Rowley
- Arabella Rowley
- Sir William Rowley, 2nd Baronet, Member of Parliament for Suffolk 1812–1830, High Sheriff of Suffolk in 1791
- Philadelphia Rowley, married Admiral Sir Charles Cotton
- Admiral Bartholomew Samuel Rowley, who also served as Commander-in-Chief of the Jamaica Station
- Reverend Joshua Rowley
- Admiral Sir Charles Rowley.

== Sources ==
- Cundall, Frank (1915). Historic Jamaica. West India Committee.

Military offices
Preceded by Peter Parker	Commander-in-Chief, Jamaica Station; 1782–1783	Succeeded by James Gambier
Baronetage of Great Britain
New creation	Baronet (of Tendring Hall); 1786–1790	Succeeded by William Rowley
