= 1922 New Year Honours =

British royal recognitions

The New Year Honours 1922 were appointments by King George V to various orders and honours to reward and highlight good works by members of the British Empire. They were published on 30 December 1921.

The recipients of honours are displayed here as they were styled before their new honour, and arranged by honour, with classes (Knight, Knight Grand Cross, etc.) and then divisions (Military, Civil, etc.) as appropriate.

== British Empire ==
=== Baron ===
- Sir James Buchanan, Bart, JP. High Sheriff of Sussex, 1910. A generous supporter of many public and charitable objects.
- Sir Robert Nivison, Bart. Head of the firm of R. Nivison & Co., brokers and financial advisers to the self-governing Overseas Dominions. For valuable services resulting in the successful financing of Government schemes during and after the war, also for assistance rendered to the Governments of the Overseas Dominions.
- Joseph Watson, JP. Chairman of the firm of Joseph Watson & Sons Ltd. Director of Lancashire and Yorkshire Railway. For valuable services to the country in organising Filling Factories during the war and great assistance to agriculture through the Agricultural Research Department at Leamington.
- Francis Willey, JP. Chairman of Francis Willey & Co., Bradford. Placed the services of all his staff at the disposal of the Wool Control during the war. For 40 years JP for Bradford. High Sheriff of the County of Nottingham, 1908.

=== Privy Councillor ===
- James Fitzalan Hope, JP, MP. Member for Central Sheffield since 1908. Chairman of Committees in House of Commons.
- Sir Ernest Murray Pollock, KBE, KC, MP. Solicitor-General since 1919. Member for Warwick and Leamington since 1910.

Privy Council in Ireland

- Richard Best, KC. Attorney-General of Northern Ireland.
- Henry Givens Burgess. Coal and Shipping Controller in Ireland during the war. Represented Ministry of Transport in Ireland since its formation.
- Thomas Kennedy Laidlaw. JP for County Dublin. High Sheriff of County Dublin, 1919. Member of Agricultural Council, Royal Dublin Society.

=== Baronet ===
- Sir Robert William Aske, , JP. For public services.
- Sir Alfred Frederick Bird, DL, JP, MP. Member for Wolverhampton. Patron of art and donor of historic pictures to the Houses of Parliament.
- Sir George Rowland Blades, MP. Member for Epsom, Division of Surrey since 1918. Senior Sheriff, City of London, 1917–18.
- Robert Reginald Frederick Butler. Chairman of United Dairies Ltd. For valuable services to agriculture and the Ministry of Food during the war.
- Sir Alfred Lassam Goodson, JP. Member Cheshire County Council, 1904–07, 1915–19. President of the Officers' Training Corps Selection Board. President of Overseas Civilian Advisory Boards GHQ (France).
- Lt-Col. Sir Henry Mulleneux Grayson, KBE, MP. Member for Birkenhead. High Sheriff of Anglesey, 1917–18. Director of Ship Repairs (Admiralty) during the war.
- Joseph Hood, MP. Member for Wimbledon. For public services.
- Robert Paterson Houston, JP, MP. Member for the West Toxteth Division of Liverpool for 30 years. JP for Liverpool. Took an active part in raising and equipping troops during the early days of the war.
- Charles Hyde, OBE. Proprietor of the Birmingham Daily Post and of the Birmingham Mail.
- Joseph John Jarvis. Director of the Financial News and the Argus Printing Company.
- David Richard Llewellyn, JP. Chairman of the Llewellyn Shipping Co., and Chief Partner of Llewellyn, Merratt & Price Ltd. Chairman of many colliery companies. For public services.
- Sir Edward Mortimer Mountain. Chairman, Eagle, Star and British Dominions Insurance Co. For public services.
- James Readhead, JP. Chairman and managing director of the firm of John Readhead & Sons, Ltd., Shipbuilders. Formally a member of the Board of Trade Committee on Shipping and Shipbuilding. Member of the London Committee of Lloyd's Register of Shipping. President of many local charitable institutions.
- Hugh Reid, CBE, , DL, JP, DL. Chief Managing Director and Deputy Chairman of the North British Locomotive Company Ltd.
- Sir Matthew Gemmill Wallace. For services rendered to the Defence of the Realm Losses Commission and War Compensation Court.
- Sir David Yule. Head of the firm of Yule, Catto & Co., East India Merchants, Calcutta, and throughout India. Director of London City & Midland Bank and of the Mercantile Bank of India. For public services.

India

- Sir Alexander McRobert, KBE, , FRGS. President of the Board, Indian Chamber of Commerce, from 1898 to 1908, and Member of the Legislative Council of the United Provinces from 1900 to 1908.

=== Knight Bachelor ===
- George Stewart Abram, MB, BC, MRCS, LRCP. Mayor of Reading 1918–20. Senior Physician of the Royal Berkshire Hospital.
- James Adam, CBE, KC. Kings and Lords Remembrancer in Scotland. For public and local services.
- Albert Barratt, JP. Chairman and managing director of Barratt & Co., Ltd. For public services.
- Alderman Alfred Barrow, OBE. Mayor of the Borough of Barrow-in-Furness 1913–19. Member of the Town Council since 1892, and Alderman for the past sixteen years.
- Frederick Edward Robert Becker. Head of one of the largest groups of paper makers in the country. During the war conducted all experiments for Paper Controller, and rendered valuable services in connection with the wood pulp and paper industries. Formerly a member of the Admiralty Arbitration Committee.
- Harry Bird. Member of the Court of Common Council for 25 years. Chairman, City of London Reception Committee.
- George Seaton Buchanan, CB, MD, BSc. Senior Medical Officer, Ministry of Health. Government Representative on the League of Nations Health Conference and Office Internationale d'Hygiene Publique.
- Frederick William Louis Butterfield, MA JP. Mayor of Keighley, 1916–18. For public and local services.
- Malcolm Campbell. Ex-Baillie of Glasgow. For public services.
- William Carruthers. General Manager, Barclays Bank. Director of British Fire Insurance Company.
- Thomas Comyn-Platt. Secretary to HM Commission in Uganda in 1898.
- James Henry Clifden Crockett, JP. Head of the firm of Crockett Jones, Northampton. President and Chairman of many local institutions. For public services.
- Henry Honywood Curtis-Bennett, KC. For services to the Criminal Investigation Department.
- Edmund Robert Bartley Denniss, MP. Member for Oldham since 1911.
- Gerald Hubert Edward Busson du Maurier. Actor–Manager.
- James Duncan, JP. Managing Director of Steel Bros., & Co., Ltd., East India Merchants. Chairman, Royal Insurance Co. For public services.
- Captain William Edge, MP. Member for Bolton since 1916.
- Alderman John Francis, JP. Mayor of the Borough of Southend-on-Sea, 1912–13, 1920–21. Deputy Mayor, 1913–20.
- William Graham, JP. Chairman and managing director of the Cardiff Dry Dock & Engineering Co., Tubal Cain Foundry & Engineering Works, and the Buchanan Shipping Investment Co. Ltd. For public services.
- Harry Greer, MP. Member for the Wells Division of Somerset. Formerly Member for Clapham. Chairman of Board of Trade Committee, Merchandise Marks Act. Chairman of Lord Roberts Memorial Workshops.
- Charles Henry Hawtrey, Actor–Manager.
- Professor William Abbott Herdman, CBE, President, British Association.
- Albert John Hobson. President of Association of Chambers of Commerce of the United Kingdom, 1920–21. Pro-Chancellor of University of Sheffield.
- Richard Walter Jeans. General Manager, Bank of Australasia.
- Captain Francis L'Estrange Joseph, CBE, JP. Director of Settle, Speakman & Co. Ltd. For public services.
- Alderman Amos Child Kirk. Lord Mayor of Cardiff, 1918–19. Member of the City Council for over 16 years.
- Cyril Reginald Sutton Kirkpatrick. Chief Engineer, Port of London Authority, since 1913.
- John Maccoy, JP. Mayor of the Borough of Gateshead 1912–14, 1916–19. During the war presented a fully equipped motor ambulance to the St John Ambulance and Red Cross Society.
- Provost Donald Macdonald. Provost of Inverness during the war. For public and local services.
- Harold Vincent Mackintosh. Managing Director and Chairman of John Mackintosh & Sons, Ltd. Actively associated with local efforts for the public welfare of Halifax. For public and local services.
- Alfred Samuel Mays-Smith. President of the Society of Motor Manufacturers and Traders. Rendered important services to the Disposal and Liquidation Commission. For public services.
- Amos Nelson. Mayor of Nelson, 1903–06. Borough Magistrate for 15 years. County Magistrate for 10 years.
- Daniel Neylan, CBE. Joint Secretary, Disposal and Liquidation Commission.
- Alderman Edward Packard, JP. Alderman and High Steward of Ipswich. Chairman of the Harwich Harbour Board. President of the Suffolk Chamber of Agriculture.
- John Lovell Pank, DL, JP. Clerk of Hertfordshire Education Committee.
- John Herbert Parsons, , FRGS, FRS. Surgeon, Royal London Ophthalmic Hospital.
- Major William Henry Prescott, MP. Member for North Tottenham since 1918. Governor, Prince of Wales General Hospital, Tottenham.
- Frederick Morton Radcliffe. Proprietor of Liverpool Courier and Liverpool Express.
- Colonel Joseph Reed. Chairman of the Press Association. For public services.
- Alexander Richardson, MP. Member for Gravesend. Managing Director of Engineering Ltd. Vice-president of the Junior Institution of Engineers, and Companion of the Institution of Marine Engineers.
- Landon Ronald. Conductor and Composer. Principal of Guildhall School of Music.
- His Honour Judge Charles Lister Shand. Judge of Liverpool County Court for 32 years.
- James Jebusa Shannon, RA. Artist.
- Montagu Sharp, KC, DL. Chairman, Middlesex Quarter Sessions since 1908.
- Charles Henry Renn Stansfield, CB. Late Director, Greenwich Hospital.
- John William Thomson Walker, OBE, FRCS. Senior Urologist and Lecturer on Urology, King's College Hospital.
- Meredith Thompson Whittaker. For valuable services to the Provincial Press for many years.
- Robert Clermont Witt, CBE. Trustee, National Gallery.

Ireland

- James Mecredy,. Solicitor to Local Government Board, Ireland.
- Simon William Maddock, DL, JP. For public services. Governor of the Royal Hibernian School and of various leading Dublin Hospitals.

India

- Alexander Phillips Muddiman, CSI, CIE, Indian Civil Service, President of the Council of State.
- Alexander Frederick Whyte, President of the Legislative Assembly.
- Mr. Justice William Chevis, Indian Civil Service, Puisne Judge, High Court, Punjab.
- Mr. Justice Thomas William Richardson, Indian Civil Service, Puisne Judge, High Court, Calcutta, Bengal.
- Mr. Justice Walter George Salis Schwabe, KC, Chief Justice, High Court, Madras.
- Mr. Justice Sydney Maddock Robinson, Chief Judge, Chief Court, Lower Burma.
- M.R.Ry Rao Sahib Muthiah Chidambaram Muthiah Chettiyar Avargal, Member of the Legislative Council, Sheriff of Madras.
- James Fletcher Simpson, Member of the Legislative Council, Partner in Messrs. Gordon, Woodroffe & Co., Madras.
- Dhunjibhoy Bomanji, Shipping Magnate and Philanthropist, Bombay.
- Arthur Henry Froom, Merchant, Bombay, Member of the Council of State.
- Robert Middleton Watson-Smyth, President, Bengal Chamber of Commerce, Bengal.
- Edwin John, CBE, Merchant, Agra, United Provinces.
- Robert Glover Jaquet, CIE, late Accountant-General, India Office.

Dominions, Crown Colonies, Protectorates, etc.

- Ernest Chappell, CBE, in recognition of services rendered to the Union of South Africa.
- James Hugh Buchanan Coates, a member of the board of directors of the National Bank of New Zealand.
- Professor George Edward Cory, of the Rhodes University College, Grahamstown, Union of South Africa.
- The Honourable Leo Finn Bernard Cussen, Judge of the Supreme Court of Victoria.
- Stanley Fisher, Chief Justice of Cyprus.
- John Maynard Hedstrom, Member of the Executive Council and Elected Member of the Legislative Council of the Colony of Fiji.
- The Honourable Arthur Weir Mason, Puisne Judge of the Supreme Court of South Africa, Transvaal Provincial Division.
- Frank Beaumont Moulden, late Lord Mayor of the City of Adelaide, South Australia. Has rendered prominent services in all matters affecting civic administration.
- John Ross, of the City of Dunedin, Dominion of New Zealand. Has taken practical interest in educational and philanthropic work.
- William Vicars, CBE, of the City of Sydney, in recognition of services rendered to the Commonwealth of Australia.
- Lionel Mabbott Woodward, Chief Judicial Commissioner, Federated Malay States.

=== Order of the Bath ===
==== Knight Grand Cross of the Order of the Bath (GCB) ====
Military Division

Royal Navy

- Admiral of the Fleet Sir Cecil Burney, Bart, GCMG, KCB.

Civil Division

- The Right Honourable Sir Horace Brand, Viscount Farquhar, GCVO, Master of the Household, 1901–07. Lord Steward since 1915.

==== Knight Commander of the Order of the Bath (KCB) ====
Military Division

Royal Navy

- Admiral Sir Edward Francis Benedict Charlton, KCMG, CB.
- Engineer Rear-Admiral Arthur Frederick Kingsnorth, CB.
- Paymaster Rear-Admiral William Marcus Charles Beresford Whyte, CB, CMG.

Army

- Major-General Edward Maxwell Perceval, CB, DSO, Retired Pay.
- Major-General Oliver Stewart Wood Nugent, CB, DSO, Retired Pay.
- Major-General Neill Malcolm, CB, DSO, General Officer Commanding Straits Settlements.
- Lieutenant-General Sir Michael Joseph Tighe, KCMG, CB, CIE, DSO, Retired Pay, Indian Army.
- Major-General Courtenay Clarke Manifold, CB, CMG, MB, KHP, Indian Medical Service.

Royal Air Force

- Group Captain (acting Air Commodore) Matthew Henry Gregson Fell, CB, CMG, Royal Air Force Medical Service.

Civil Division

- Hon. Commodore Sir Richard Henry Williams-Bulkeley, Bart, CB, Royal Naval Reserve.
- Lieutenant-Colonel and Honorary Colonel Thomas Warne Lemmon, CB, Honorary Colonel, 3rd Battalion (Reserve), The East Surrey Regiment.

==== Companion of the Order of the Bath (CB) ====
Military Division

Royal Navy

- Rear-Admiral Cole Cortlandt Fowler.
- Rear-Admiral William John Standly Alderson.
- Colonel Edward James Stroud, CMG, Royal Marine Light Infantry.
- Captain Selwyn Mitchell Day, DSO, ADC, Royal Naval Reserve.

Army

- Colonel (temporary Colonel Commandant) Hubert Isacke, CSI, CMG, Brigade Commander, 17th Indian Infantry Brigade.
- Colonel Reginald St. George Gorton, CMG, General Staff.
- Colonel (temporary Colonel on the Staff) Charles Ernest Graham Norton, CSI, ADC, Director of Remounts, War Office.
- Colonel Montagu Leyland Hornby, CMG, DSO, Brigade Commander, Lancashire Fusiliers Infantry Brigade, Western Command.
- Colonel John Tuthill Dreyer, DSO, assistant director of Artillery, War Office.
- Colonel (temporary Colonel Commandant) Francis Robert Patch, CMG, DSO, Commanding Royal Artillery, Western Command, East Indies.
- Colonel Henry William Richard Senior, CIE, DSO, Indian Army, Assistant Quartermaster-General, Northern Command, East Indies.
- Colonel Hubert Walter Codrington, Indian Army, Director of Military Prisons and Detention Barracks, East Indies.
- Colonel (temporary Colonel on the Staff) Walter Henry Norman, DSO, Indian Army, General Staff, Southern Command, East Indies.

Royal Air Force

- Group Captain Amyas Eden Borton, CMG, DSO, AFC.

Civil Division

- Captain William Francis Tunnard, Royal Navy. (Dated 26 November 1921).
- Surgeon Rear-Admiral William Bett, MVO.
- Lieutenant-General Leonard Thales Pease, Royal Marines.
- Colonel Angus John McNeill, DSO, Brigade Commander, Norfolk & Suffolk Infantry Brigade, Territorial Army (Major, Retired Pay).
- Lieutenant-Colonel Edward Thomas Lea, TD, Retired, Territorial Army.
- William Sydney Smith, OBE, Superintendent of the Royal Aircraft Establishment, South Farnborough.
- Frank James Brown, CBE, Head of the Telegraph Branch, General Post Office.
- Edward Horsman Coles, Controller of Lands, War Office, since 1908.
- Robert Patrick Malcolm Gower, Assistant Private Secretary to the Right Hon. A. Bonar Law, 1917–18. Private Secretary to the Rt. Hon. Austen Chamberlain since 1919.
- Cyril William Hurcomb, CBE, Assistant Secretary, Finance Branch, Ministry of Transport. Late Deputy Director, Transport Department, Ministry of Shipping.
- Thomas Williams Phillips, CBE, Principal Assistant Secretary in Charge of Employment and Insurance Department, Ministry of Labour.
- Alfred William Pollard, Keeper of Printed Books, British Museum.

=== Order of Merit ===
- Sir James Matthew Barrie, Bart., MA, LLD (Edin.). In recognition of his services to literature and the drama.

=== Order of the Star of India ===
==== Knight Commander of the Order of the Star of India (KCSI) ====
- Captain His Highness Maharawal Shri Ranjitsinhji Mansinhji, Raja of Baria, Bombay.
- Khan Bahadur Mian Muhammad Shafi, CIE, Barrister-at-Law, Member of the Viceroy's Council.
- William Malcolm Hailey, CSI, CIE, Member of the Viceroy's Council.
- Sir Alfred Hamilton Grant, KCIE, CSI, late Chief Commissioner and Agent to the Governor-General, North-West Frontier Province.

==== Companion of the Order of the Star of India (CSI) ====
- Captain His Highness Raja Narendra Sah, Raja of Tehri (Garhwal), United Provinces.
- Arthur Rowland Knapp, CBE, Indian Civil Service, temporary Member of the Executive Council, Fort St. George, Madras.
- Norman Edward Marjoribanks, CIE, Indian Civil Service, Officiating Chief Secretary to the Government of Madras.
- Denys de Saumarez Bray, CIE, CBE, Indian Civil Service, Officiating Secretary to the Government of India, Foreign & Political Department.
- Robert Edward Vaughan Arbuthnot, Indian Civil Service, Financial Commissioner, Burma.
- Charles Montague King, CIE, Member of the Legislative Council, Indian Civil Service, Financial Commissioner (Development), Punjab.
- Rai Bahadur Pandit Hairi Kishan Kaul, CIE, Provincial Civil Service, Officiating Commissioner, Jullundur Division, Punjab.
- Sidney Robert Hignell, CIE, Indian Civil Service, Private Secretary to His Excellency the Viceroy.
- James Crerar, CIE, Indian Civil Service, Secretary to Government, Home Department, Bombay.
- Waters Edward Copleston, Chief Conservator of Forests, Bombay.
- Frederick Buisson Evans, Indian Civil Service, Special Civil Officer, Malabar.
- Colonel Sydney Frederick Muspratt, CIE, DSO, Indian Army.

=== Order of Saint Michael and Saint George ===
==== Knight Grand Cross of the Order of St Michael and St George (GCMG) ====
- Major-General Sir Percy Zachariah Cox, GCIE, KCSI, KCMG, High Commissioner and Commander-in-Chief for Iraq.
- Sir James Stevenson, Bart., in recognition of services as Adviser to the Secretary of State for the Colonies on business questions, and as late member of the Munitions Council (1917 to 1919) and of the Army and Air Councils (1919 to 1921).

==== Knight Commander of the Order of St Michael and St George (KCMG) ====
- Brigadier-General Frederick Gordon Guggisberg, CMG, DSO, Governor and Commander-in-Chief of the Gold Coast Colony.
- Eyre Hutson, CMG, Governor and Commander-in-Chief of the Colony of British Honduras.
- The Honourable Sir Walter Henry Lee, Kt., Premier, Chief Secretary and Minister for Education of the State of Tasmania.
- Gilbert Edmund Augustine Grindle, CB, CMG, Assistant Under-Secretary of State, Colonial Office.
- John Evelyn Shuckburgh, CB, Acting Assistant Under-Secretary of State, Colonial Office, from the India, Office.
- The Right Honourable Sir George Dixon Grahame, KCVO, His Majesty's Ambassador Extraordinary and Plenipotentiary at Brussels.
- Colville Adrian de Rune Barclay, CB, CBE, MVO, His Majesty's Envoy Extraordinary and Minister Plenipotentiary at Stockholm.
- James William Ronald Macleay, CMG, His Majesty's Envoy Extraordinary and Minister Plenipotentiary at Buenos Aires.

Honorary Knight Commander

- His Highness Ismail ibni Almerhum, Sultan Mohamed IV, Sultan of Kelantan.

==== Companion of the Order of St Michael and St George (CMG) ====
- Edward Brandis Denham, Colonial Secretary of the Colony of Mauritius.
- Edmund Hugh Farrer, Secretary for Finance for the Union of South Africa.
- John Talfourd Parley, OBE, Secretary for Native Affairs, Gold Coast Colony.
- James Henry Gunson, CBE, Mayor of the City of Auckland, Dominion of New Zealand.
- Robert Bailey Hellings, lately Government Agent, Southern Province, Island of Ceylon.
- Arnold Wienholt Hodson, His Majesty's Consul for Southern Abyssinia. For services on the Northern Frontier of Kenya.
- Oliver Marks, lately British Resident, Selangor, Federated Malay States.
- Charles Murray,, Secretary for Public Works for the Union of South Africa.
- Simpson Newland, in recognition of services in the development of the State of South Australia.
- Robert Thomas Paton,, in recognition of services as Director-General of Public Health and President of the Board of Health, State of New South Wales.
- Captain William Alston Ross, Senior Resident, Southern Provinces, Nigeria.
- Major Sir Archibald Henry Macdonald Sinclair, Bart., Military Private Secretary to the Secretary of State for the Colonies.
- Henry Armstrong Smallwood, Financial Secretary to the Administration, Palestine.
- Miles Wedderburn Lampson, MVO, a First Secretary in the Foreign Office.
- Wilfrid Athelstan Johnson, MVO, until recently an Acting First Secretary in His Majesty's Diplomatic Service.
- Philip James Griffiths Pipon, CIE, MC, of the Indian Civil Service, Member of the British Mission to Kabul.

Honorary Companion

- His Highness Tunku Ibrahim, Regent of Kedah.

=== Order of the Indian Empire ===
==== Knight Commander of the Order of the Indian Empire (KCIE) ====
- His Highness Maharaja Mahendra Yadvendra Singh Bahadur, Maharaja of Panna, Central India.
- Havilland Le Mesurier, CSI, CIE, Indian Civil Service, Member and vice-president of the Executive Council, Bihar and Orissa.
- Patrick James Fagan, CSI, Member of the Legislative Council, Indian Civil Service, Financial Commissioner, Punjab.
- Rao Raja Madho Singh, of Sikar, Feudatory Chief of the Jaipur State, Rajputana.
- Sir Norcot Warren, Imperial Bank of India.
- Raja Sahib Mushfiq Mehrban Karamfarmage Mukhsan Umdu-i-Rajah Raja Velugoti Sri Govinda Krishna Yachendruluvaru Bahadur Panchhazari Mansubhdar, of Venkatagiri, Madras.
- Raja Saiyid Abu Jafar, CIE, of Pirpur, Fyzabad District, United Provinces.
- Maulvi Ahmad Husain Nawab Amin Jang Bahadur, CSI, Sadr-ul-Maham, Peshi Department, His Exalted Highness the Nizam's Government, Hyderabad (Deccan).
- Sir John Harvard Biles, Consulting Naval Architect to the India Office.
- Charles Alfred Bell, CMG, CIE, late Indian Civil Service, and Political Officer, Sikkim.
- Lieutenant-Colonel Thomas Wolseley Haig, CSI, CMG, Indian Army, late Acting Counsellor to HMS Legation, Tehran.

==== Companion of the Order of the Indian Empire (CIE) ====
- Khan Bahadur Saiyid Abdul Majid, Minister for Education to His Excellency the Governor of Assam (William Sinclair Marris).
- Major-General John Blackburn Smith, CB, Indian Medical Service, deputy director, Medical Services, Eastern Command.
- Lieutenant-Colonel Francis Hope Grant Hutchinson, Indian Medical Service, Public Health Commissioner with the Government of India.
- Francis Pepys Rennie, Indian Civil Service, Judicial Commissioner, North-West Frontier Province.
- Lieutenant-Colonel Stewart Blakely Agnew Patterson, Indian Army, Commissioner, Ajmer-Merwara, Rajputana.
- Malcolm Caird McAlpin, Indian Civil Service, Secretary to Government, Bengal.
- Edward Arthur Henry Blunt, OBE, Indian Civil Service, Financial Secretary to Government, United Provinces.
- Lieutenant-Colonel James Entrican, Indian Medical Service, Inspector-General of Civil Hospitals, Burma.
- Alexander Carmichael Stewart, MVO, Indian Police, Inspector-General of Police, Punjab.
- Walter Frank Hudson, Indian Civil Service, Collector of Poona, Bombay.
- Adrian James Robert Hope, late Superintending Engineer, Simla Imperial Circle.
- John Willoughby Meares, Electrical Adviser to the Government of India.
- Lieutenant-Colonel Robert Fraser Standage, Indian Medical Service, Residency Surgeon in Mysore, Bangalore.
- Major Kenneth Oswald Goldie, OBE, Military Secretary to His Excellency the Governor of Madras.
- Edward Francis Thomas, Indian Civil Service, Acting Collector and District Magistrate, Malabar, Madras.
- Edward Luttrell Moysey, Indian Civil Service, Collector of Satara, Bombay.
- Thomas Stewart Macpherson, Indian Civil Service, Registrar of the High Court of Judicature at Patna, Bihar and Orissa.
- Maung Po Hla, Deputy Commissioner, Pyapon, Burma.
- Arthur Campbell Armstrong, OBE, Indian Police, Superintendent of Police, Central Provinces.
- Horace Williamson, MBE, Indian Police, Superintendent of Police, United Provinces.
- Alexander Newmarch, late Accountant-General, Madras.
- Gerard Anstruther Wathen, Indian Educational Service, Principal, Khalsa College, Amritsar, Punjab.
- Khan Bahadur Mir Sharbat Khan, Officiating Political Agent, Lorali, Baluchistan.
- Natha Singh, Sardar Bahadur, Brigadier-General and Commandant, Alwar Infantry, Rajputana.
- Raja Maniloll Singh Roy, of Chakdighi, chairman, District Board, Burdwan, Bengal.
- Khan Bahadur Nasarvanji Hormasji Choksy, retired Medical Officer, Bombay Municipality.
- Lieutenant Raja Chandra Chur Singh, of Atra Chandapur, Rae Bareli District, United Provinces.
- William Scott Durrant, late Deputy Accountant-General, India Office.
- Archibald Gibson McLagan, of Messrs. Turnbull, Gibson & Co., Shipping Agents to the India Office.

=== Order of the British Empire ===
==== Knight Grand Cross of the Order of the British Empire (GBE) ====
Civil Division

- The Right Honourable Evelyn Cecil, MP, Secretary-General of the Order of St John of Jerusalem in England, 1915–21, Vice-chairman Joint War Committee of the British Red Cross Society and Order of St John of Jerusalem.
- Professor Charles Scott Sherrington, , , FRS, , FRCP, FRCS, president of the Royal Society.

==== Dame Grand Cross of the Order of the British Empire (GBE) ====
Civil Division

- Grace Elvina, Marchioness Curzon of Kedleston. For services rendered during the War to the British Red Cross Society, and to the Soldiers & Sailors Families Association, the Belgian Soldiers Club, and Queen Alexandra's Nursing Association.
- Mary Ethel Hughes, wife of the Prime Minister of Australia. For services rendered in Australia during the War.

==== Knight Commander of the Order of the British Empire (KBE) ====
Civil Division

- John William Gilbert, JP, Ex-Chairman of the London County Council.
- William Malesbury Letts, CBE. For public services.
- William McLintock, Member of Royal Commission on Income Tax and Board of Referees on Excess Profits Duty.
- Mervyn Lloyd Peel, JP. For public services in South Wales.
- Sir Alexander William Prince. For valuable services rendered in connection with the Army and Navy Canteen Board.
- Herbert Samuelson. For valuable services rendered to the British Red Cross Society and Order of St John of Jerusalem.
- Councillor John Timpson, JP, Mayor of Portsmouth, 1918–20. For public services.

==== Dame Commander of the Order of the British Empire (DBE) ====
Civil Division

- Margery, Lady Greenwood, CBE. For services in Ireland.
- Ethel Mary Smyth, Mus.Doc., Composer and Conductor.

==== Commander of the Order of the British Empire (CBE) ====
Civil Division

- Major Alexander John Munro Bennett, OBE. For public services in Argyllshire, especially in connection with the Territorial Association.
- Evelyn Elizabeth Brinton, chairman and Founder of the Housing Association for Officers Families.
- Ena Jeffie Darell, Founder of the Darell Hospital for Officers.
- Colonel William Toke Dooner, MBE, JP, for work in connection with the Soldiers & Sailors Families Association.
- Charles Alfred Jones, Deputy Constable, Carnarvon Castle.
- George Herbert Llewellin, JP, three times Mayor of Haverfordwest. For public and local services.
- The Reverend Canon Richard Arthur McLean,, Rector of Rathkeale, Co. Limerick. Acted as Chaplain (Episcopalian) to the Forces in the East (Gallipoli and Serbia).
- Major Colin William Macrae, of Feoirlinn, DL, JP. For valuable services in connection with the British Red Cross Society and Order of St John of Jerusalem.
- Wilfred Moss, MBE, president of the Leicestershire Law Society. Ex-Mayor of Loughborough.
- John Oldershaw, JP, Mayor of Wallasey, 1911–12. For public services in Liverpool and District.
- Dudley William Ward, Officer in charge of statistics, Treasury, 1916–19. Attached to British Delegation for International Conference, Brussels, 1920.

==== Officer of the Order of the British Empire (OBE) ====
Civil Division

- Dorothy Caroline Edmondes. For work among the wounded and ex-Servicemen in Bridgend.

=== Order of the Companions of Honour (CH) ===
- Sir Henry Jones, FBA , Professor of Philosophy, Glasgow.
- Sir Henry Newbolt, MA LLD DLitt, Barrister and Author.
- Joseph Havelock Wilson, CBE, MP, General President, National Sailor's & Firemen's Union. Secretary, Merchant Seamen's League.

=== Kaisar-i-Hind Medal ===
First Class

- Lester Hayes Beals, American Marathi Mission, Physician and Surgeon, Bombay.
- The Reverend Peter Noble, Minister, Baptist Mission, Bengal.
- The Reverend Frederick Vincent Thomas, Baptist Medical Mission, Palwal, Gurgaon District, Punjab.
- The Reverend John Credig Evans, Welsh Calvinistic Methodist Missionary, Assam.
- Vadakke Kurupani Parukutti Netyarammal, Consort of His Highness the Maharaja of Cochin, Madras.
- The Reverend David Chandler Gilmore, Principal, Judson College, Rangoon, Burma.
- Ruth Darbyshire, Superintendent of the Lady Minto Nursing Association.
- Georgiana Mary Bear, Commissioner of Girl Guides.

Bar to the Kaisar-i-Hind Medal

- Katherine Annie Louise, Lady Knox, United Provinces.
- Cornelia Sorabji, Lady Assistant to Court of Wards in Bengal.

=== Royal Victorian Order ===
==== Knight Grand Cross of the Royal Victorian Order (GCVO) ====
- His Royal Highness Prince Henry, KG.
- General Sir Frederick Rudolph, Earl of Cavan, KP, GCMG, KCB, MVO.

==== Knight Commander of the Royal Victorian Order (KCVO) ====
- Sir Edward Arthur, Baron Colebrooke, CVO.
- Rear-Admiral The Hon. Sir Hubert George Brand, KCMG, CB, CVO.
- The Hon. Henry Julian Stonor, CVO.
- William Rose Smith, CB, CVO.
- Percy Coleman Simmons.

==== Commander of the Royal Victorian Order (CVO) ====
- George Arthur Maurice, Baron Stanmore.
- Colonel The Hon. Claude Henry Comaraich Willoughby.
- John Thomas Davies, CB.
- Edward Howard Marsh, CB, CMG.
- Francis Edward Raikes, MVO, OBE.

==== Member of the Royal Victorian Order, 4th class (MVO) ====
- Captain The Hon. James Gray Stuart, MC (Dated 3 December 1921).
- Major Edward Seymour, DSO, OBE, MVO (Fifth Class).
- Captain Albert Edward Williams, MVO (Fifth Class) (Dated 10 August 1921).
- Christopher Harry Bland. (Dated 11 November 1921).
- Geoffrey Dudley Hobson.
- Frederick Arthur Harman Oates.
- William Gurney Rothery.

=== King's Police Medal (KPM) ===
England & Wales

- Captain Donald Bremner, Assistant Commissioner, City of London Police.
- William George Morant, OBE, Chief Constable of Durham County.
- Herbert Allen, Chief Constable, Leicester City Police.
- Arthur Charles Quest, OBE, Deputy Chief Constable, West Riding of Yorkshire Constabulary.
- John Williams, Chief Superintendent and Deputy Chief Constable, Glamorgan Constabulary.
- James Davies, Superintendent, Glamorgan Constabulary.
- George Weathers, Superintendent, Sheffield City Police.
- Samuel Tongue, Superintendent, Manchester City Police.
- Charles Arthur Norman, Inspector, East Suffolk Constabulary.
- Richard Lewis, Inspector, Lancashire Constabulary.
- Thomas Buchanan, Inspector, Metropolitan Police.
- John Thomas, Sergeant, Metropolitan Police.
- William Edwin Boucher, Constable, Manchester City Police.
- Michael Bolas, Detective, Manchester City Police.
- Richard Bailey, Constable, Manchester City Police.
- George Bloomfield, Constable, Birmingham City Police.
- George Barlow, Constable, Leeds City Police.
- Thomas Jones, Constable, Lancashire Constabulary.
- Henry Bowden, Constable, Salford Borough Police.
- Charles Hall, Constable, Metropolitan Police.
- Jack Lewis, Constable, Metropolitan Police.
- Samuel Taylor, Constable, Metropolitan Police.
- Harry Powell, Constable, Metropolitan Police.
- William Burton, Constable, Metropolitan Police.
- George Smith, Constable, Metropolitan Police.
- Percy Green, Constable, Metropolitan Police.
- George Humphrey Durrant, Special Constable, East Suffolk Special Constabulary.
- Ernest Henry Hooper, Special Constable, West Sussex Special Constabulary.

Fire Brigades

- James Thomas Burns, Chief Officer, Birkenhead Fire Brigade.
- Charles Dixon, Superintendent, Bromley Fire Brigade.
- John Jones, Sergeant, Wigan Police Fire Brigade.
- Oswald Hutchinson, Constable, Leeds Police Fire Brigade.

Scotland

- John Bagrie Mair, OBE, MVO, Chief Constable, Morayshire Constabulary.
- Roderick Ross, CBE, MVO, Chief Constable, Edinburgh City Police.
- Henry Robinson, Superintendent and Deputy Chief Constable, Linlithgowshire Constabulary.
- Andrew Nisbet Keith, Detective Superintendent, Glasgow City Police.

Ireland

- Charles Cheesman, County Inspector, Royal Irish Constabulary.
- Ernest Oswald Gerity, Temporary County Inspector, Royal Irish Constabulary.
- William F. Martinson, District Inspector, Royal Irish Constabulary.
- Thomas Naughton, District Inspector, Royal Irish Constabulary.
- John McGoldrick, Head Constable, Royal Irish Constabulary.
- James Fleming, Sergeant, Royal Irish Constabulary.
- George Devin, Constable, Dublin Metropolitan Police.
- William H. Bennett, Constable, Dublin Metropolitan Police.
- John Dillon, Constable, Dublin Metropolitan Police.
- Francis Allen, Constable, Dublin Metropolitan Police.
- John O'Connor, Constable, Dublin Metropolitan Police.
- Patrick Dennis, Constable, Dublin Metropolitan Police.
- Thomas Kelly, Constable, Dublin Metropolitan Police.
- John Healy, Constable, Dublin Metropolitan Police.
- Patrick Cafferky, Constable, Dublin Metropolitan Police.

India

- William Henry Pitt, Superintendent, Madras Police.
- Thomas Anthony Sumner, Sergeant, Madras Police.
- Sankrathy Yeshiah, Constable, Madras Police.
- Henry Edgar Keats, Sergeant, Madras Police.
- William Adolphus Percival Hankinson, Acting Inspector, Madras City Police.
- Shunmugam Pillai Duraiswami Pallai, Sub-Inspector, Madras Police.
- Thakya Gyanu, Constable, Bombay Police.
- Shripat Pawji, Constable, Bombay Police.
- George Alexander Shillidy, District Superintendent, Bombay Police.
- Ghelabhai Atmaram Megha, Deputy Superintendent, Bombay Police.
- Ivan Campbell Boyd, District Superintendent, Bombay Police.
- John Alphonse Marie Joachim Goldie, Deputy Commissioner of Police, Calcutta, and officiating Deputy Inspector-General, Bengal Police.
- Jagadishi Dube, Constable, Bengal Police.
- Baliram Singh, Constable, Bengal Police.
- Babu Umesh Chandra Chanda, Officiating Deputy Superintendent, Bengal Police.
- Francis John Lowman, Indian (Imperial) Police Service, Bengal.
- John Edward Fife, Superintendent, United Provinces Police.
- Tej Singh, Head Constable, United Provinces Police.
- Hugh Gordon Richardson, Deputy Inspector-General, United Provinces Police.
- Hercules de Lautour Ross, Deputy Inspector-General, United Provinces Police.
- Abdul Hamid Khan, Sub-Inspector, United Provinces Police.
- Sultan Khan, Sub-Inspector, Punjab Police.
- Muhammad Mehr Dil Khan, Punjab Police.
- Sher Mohammad, Head Constable, Punjab Police.
- Ali Muhammad, Foot Constable, Punjab Police.
- Sardar Amrik Singh, Deputy Inspector-General, Punjab Police.
- Ahmad Niwaz Khan, Head Constable, Punjab Police.
- Telu Singh, First Grade Head Constable, Burma Police.
- Maung San Ko, KSM, TDM, Inspector and Honorary Deputy Superintendent, Burma Police.
- Lieutenant-Colonel Frank Leslie Orman, IA, Officiating Deputy Inspector-General, Burma Military Police (retired).
- Sardar Bahadur Kishen Singih, Naib Commandant, Burma Military Police.
- Deodhari Singh, Constable, Assam Police.
- Ram Dahin Chowbey, Constable, Assam Police.
- Feroz-ud-din, Sub-Inspector, North-West Frontier Province Police.
- Feroz Khan, Officiating Sub-Inspector, North-West Frontier Province Police.
- Sarmast Khan, Sepoy, North-West Frontier Province Police.
- Muhammad Azizulla, Touring Superintendent, Hyderabad Police.
- Dajee Khandaji Mandavkar, Sub-Inspector, Bombay Police.
- Shivlingappa Bhagappa, Sub-Inspector, Bombay Police.
- I. W. Bowring, Superintendent, Punjab Police.
- Ismail Husain, Constable, Aden Harbour Police.
- Clive Gordon Tottenham, Acting Superintendent, Madras Police.
- Khan Bahadur Elayath Valiyapath Amu, Deputy Superintendent, Madras Police.
- Nangath Narayana Menon, Inspector, Madras Police.
- Uppath Kunhi Kannan, Sub-Inspector, Madras Police.
- Kalavur Arikat Sekharan Nair, Constable, Madras Police.

British Dominions Beyond The Seas

- Bertie John Merritt, Police Constable, Ontario, Canada.
- Thomas Joseph Wynne, OBE, Deputy Commissioner of Police, Union of South Africa.
- Francis Dashwood Tyssen, Assistant Commissioner of Police, Kenya.
- Louis Stephen Douglas Hamilton Venour, Commissioner of Police, Gold Coast.
- Imoru Kanjarga, First Class Constable, Gold Coast Police.
- Albert Edward Rogerson, Police Constable, Bermuda Police.
- Henry James Geen, Sergeant-Major, Leeward Islands Police.
- Ismail bin Mohamed Salleh, Sub-Inspector, Federated Malay States Police.
- Ahmat bin Hassan, Police Constable, Singapore Police.
- Santa Singh, Detective Special Police Constable, Penang Police.
- John Costello, Chief Detective Inspector, Singapore Police.
- Lee Sing Cheong, Detective Police Constable, Singapore Police.
- Seah Bun Soo, Detective Police Constable, Singapore Police.

==== Bar to the Kings Police Medal ====
Scotland

- William Tait Brown, Detective Sergeant, Glasgow City Police.

India

- Thomas Edwin Furze, MC, Superintendent, Assam Police.

=== Royal Red Cross (RRC) ===
- Ethel Kelso, Senior Nursing Sister, Queen Alexandra's Military Nursing Service for India.

=== Air Force Cross (AFC) ===
- Flight Lieutenant Augustus Henry Orlebar.
- Flight Lieutenant David Arthur Stewart, MC, DFC.
- Flying Officer Sidney Norman Webster.

==== Bar to the Air Force Cross ====
- Squadron Leader Roderic Maxwell Hill, MC, AFC.

==== Second Bar to the Air Force Cross ====
- Squadron Leader William Ronald Read, MC, DFC, AFC. (Captain, Dragoon Guards).

=== Promotions ===
==== Royal Navy ====
The following promotions have been made, dated 31 December 1921.

Commander to Captain

- Fischer Burges Watson, DSO.
- Charles E. Kennedy-Purvis.
- Francis A. Beasley, MVO.
- George H. Knowles, DSO.
- Kenneth MacLeod.
- Julian F. C. Patterson, OBE.
- James F. Somerville, DSO.
- Kenelm E. L. Creighton.
- Charles E. Turle, DSO.
- Clinton F. S. Danby.

Engineer-Commander to Engineer-Captain

- Walter Rudolph Parnall.
- Ivor E. S. Roberts.
- Francis Graham.

Engineer-Lieutenant-Commander to Engineer-Commander

- Percy D. Fulford.
- John D. Grieve.
- Douglas Hill.
- Henry A. Sheridan.
- William C. Horton.
- Gerald Robins.
- Sidney G. Wheeler.
- MacLeod G. A. Edwards, OBE.
- Gerald E. W. McEwen.
- Robert H. Withey.
- Frank G. Brown.
- Harold L. Harvey.
- Frederick W. Gordon Smith.
- Geoffrey Morgan.
- George Villar.
- Samuel H. Dunlop.

Surgeon-Commander to Surgeon-Captain

- Edward T. Meagher. (Dated 21 December 1921).

Paymaster-Commander to Paymaster-Captain

(Dated 31 December 1921).

- Ernest A. Bremner.
- Richard B. Hosking.
- Henry M. Ommanney

(Dated 1 January 1922).

- Henry Horniman.
- Kenneth S. Hay.
- Victor H. T. Weekes, CB.

Instructor-Commander to Instructor-Captain

- Alexander E. Monro,.

Royal Naval Reserve

Lieutenant-Commander to Commander

- Ronald C. Glazebrook.
- Ernest Edkin, RD.
- Alexander Riddel, RD.
- Gordon L. Simner, RD.
- Frank P. Swinney, RD.
- Guy S. Owen, RD.
- Thomas W. Young, OBE, RD.
- Alexander S. Mackay, RD.

==== Royal Air Force ====
The undermentioned officers are promoted to the ranks stated, with effect from 1 January 1922.

GENERAL LIST

Air Commodore to Air Vice-Marshal

- Philip Woolcott Game, CB, DSO.

Group-Captain to Air Commodore

- Hugh Caswall Tremenheere Dowding, CMG.
- Bertie Clephane Hawley Drew, CMG, CBE.
- Charles Rumney Samson, CMG, DSO, AFC.
- Robert Hamilton Clark-Hall CMG, DSO.

Wing Commander to Group Captain

- Alfred Drummond Warrington-Morris, CMG, OBE.
- Norman Duckworth Kerr MacEwen, CMG, DSO.
- Hon. John David Boyle, CBE, DSO.
- Edward Featherstone Briggs, DSO, OBE.
- Peregrine Forbas Morant Fellowes, DSO.

Squadron Leader to Wing Commander

- Dermott Lang Allen, AFC.
- Charles Humphrey Kingsman Edmonds, DSO, OBE.
- Richard Edmund Charles Peirse, DSO, AFC.
- Reynell Henry Verney, OBE.
- Thomas O'Brien Hubbard, MC, AFC.
- Lawrence Arthur Pattinson, DSO, MC, DFC.
- Hazelton Robson Nicholl, OBE.
- Arthur Thomas Whitelock.
- Robert John Ferguson Barton, OBE.
- William Lawrie Welsh, DSC, AFC.
- Hugh Lambert Reilly, DSO.

Flight Lieutenant to Squadron-Leader

- William Bowen Hargrave, OBE.
- Hugh Vernon Champion de Crespigny, MC, DFC.
- Ivor Thomas Lloyd.
- Eric John Hodsoll.
- Raymond Collishaw, DSO, OBE, DSC, DFC.
- Cyril Gordon Burge, OBE.
- Francis William Henry Lerwill, OBE.
- Charles Henry Elliott-Smith, AFC.
- Charles Oscar Frithiof Modin, DSC.
- Sir Christopher Joseph Quinton Brand, KBE, DSO, MC, DFC.

Flying Officer to Flight Lieutenant

- Herbert Martin Massey, MC.
- Geoffrey Arthur Henzell Pidcock.
- Cecil Alfred Stevens, MC.
- Walter Travis Swire Williams, DSC.
- Samuel Marcus Kinkead, DSO, DSC, DFC.
- Seymour Stewart Benson, AFC.
- Edward Derek Davis.
- Peter Cundle Wood.
- Robert Allingham George, MC.
- Frederick McBean Paul.
- Allen Robert Churchman, DFC.
- Bernard McEntegart.
- Peter Wanburton, MBE.
- Frank Gerald Craven Weare, MC.
- William Edmund Somervell.
- Alfred Conrad Collier.
- Kenneth Buchanan Lloyd, AFC.
- George Thomas Richardson.
- Maurice Henry Butler, DFC.
- William Geoffrey Meggitt, MC.
- Eric John Webster, DFC.
- Herbert Edwin Tansley, MC.
- Ian Cullen, AFC.
- George Cecil Gardiner, DFC
- Arthur Vincent Howard Gompertz.
- Maurice Moore.
- Arthur Francis Quinlan.
- Percy John Barnett, MC.
- Sydney Edward Toomer, DFC.
- Leslie Norman Hollinghurst, DFC.
- Clement Flegg Horsley, MC.
- Charles Basil Slater Spackman, DFC.
- Ernest Lionel Ardley.
- Richard Michael Trevethan, MC.
- Neville Byron Ward.
- Edward Reginald Openshaw.
- Reginald Thomas Brooke Houghton, AFC.
- Ralph Myddleton Bankes-Jones.
- James John Williamson, AFC.
- Owen Washington de Putron.
- Robert Hugh Hanmer, MC.
- Victor Hubert Tait.
- James Matthews McEntegart.
- Robert William Edwards.
- James Alexander Gordon Haslam, MC, DFC.
- Kenneth Lloyd Harris.
- Albert Grounds Peace, AFC.
- William Conway Day, MC.

STORES LIST

Squadron Leader to Wing Commander

- Walter John Dakins Pryce, OBE, DCM.

Flight Lieutenant to Squadron Leader

- William Boston Cushion.
- Eric Rivers-Smith, MBE.
- James Ambrose Stone.
- William Henry George Maton, MBE.

Flying Officer to Flight Lieutenant

- Arthur Benjamin Wiggin.
- William Arthur Kingston.
- Ernest William Crosbie.
- Frederick Thomas McElwee.
- Arthur Myrtle Saywood.
- Harry Leonard Woolveridge.
- Arthur Elias Sutton-Jones.
- Patrick John Murphy.
- John Henry Dale.
- Edward Ernest Porter, MBE, DCM.
- Edwin Harold Eldridge.
- Maurice Jewison James, MBE.
- Reginald Harry Smyth, MC.
- Alfred Horace Comfort.
- Henry Sewell Alger.
- Leonard Arthur Lavender.
- Richard Adams.
- Lamont Smith.
- Charlie Young Mitchell.
- John Augustus Plunkett.

MEDICAL SERVICE

Squadron Leader to Wing Commander

- Henry Wakeman Scott, MB, BA.

Flight Lieutenant to Squadron Leader

- Robert Ernest Bell, MB.
- Gerald Struan Marshall, OBE.
- Eric William-Craig, MC, MB.
- Robert Andrew George Elliott, MB, BA.

Flight Lieutenant to Honorary Squadron Leader

- William Rous Kemp, BA.
