= Hellings =

Hellings is a surname. Notable people with the surname include:

- Christopher Hellings (born 1980), English cricketer
- Dick Hellings (1874–1938), English rugby player
- Doug Hellings (born 1944), Australian rules footballer
- Hellings (baseball), American baseball player
- Mack Hellings (1915–1951), American racing driver
- Peter Hellings (1916–1990), English military officer
- Robert Bailey Hellings (1863–1947), British colonial administrator in Ceylon
- Sergio Hellings (born 1984), Dutch footballer
- Sarah Hellings (born 1945), TV director whose credits include Midsomer Murders

== See also ==
- Helling
