= Francis Hutchinson (disambiguation) =

Francis Hutchinson (1660–1739) was Bishop of Down and Connor and opponent of witch-hunting.

Francis Hutchinson may also refer to:

- Francis Hutchinson (physician) (1870–1931), British physician
- Sir Francis Hutchinson, 1st Baronet, Irish politician
- Francis Hutchinson (priest), Anglican priest in Ireland
- Francis Ernest Hutchinson, English literary scholar and Anglican clergyman
- F. W. Hutchinson (Francis William Hutchinson, 1910–1990), engineer
- Francis Hutchinson, co-founding member in the 1820s of a group that became the Plymouth Brethren, see John Nelson Darby

== See also ==
- Francis Hely-Hutchinson (1769–1827), Irish politician
- Francis Hutcheson (disambiguation)
