= Greenway Estate =

In Devon, former house of Agatha Christie

Greenway House
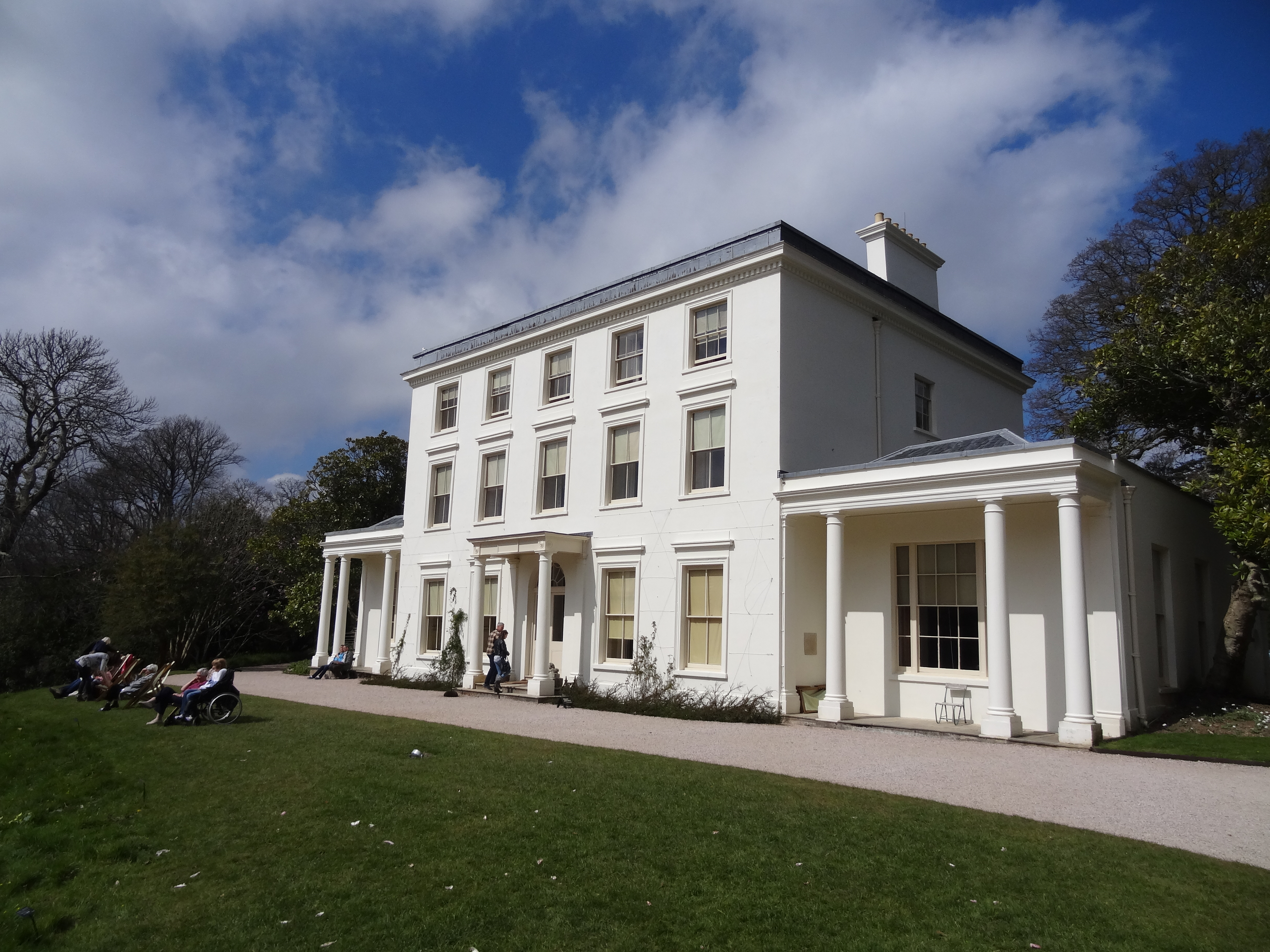

- Location within Devon
- 50.3819°N 3.5878°W
- Type: House
- Location: Galmpton, Devon

History
- Built: c. 1780

Site notes
- Architectural style: Georgian
- Governing body: National Trust

Listed Building – Grade II*
- Official name: Greenway House
- Designated: 21 May 1985
- Reference no.: 1108548

National Register of Historic Parks and Gardens
- Official name: Greenway
- Type: Grade II
- Designated: 3 March 2004
- Reference no.: 1001686

Greenway, also known as Greenway House, is an estate on the River Dart near Galmpton in Devon, England. Once the home of the author Agatha Christie, it is now owned by the National Trust.

The estate was served by the Dartmouth Steam Railway, with trains from Paignton and Kingswear stopping at Greenway Halt station. However, since March 2020, no services have stopped here.

== History ==
=== Location and early development: up to 1938 ===
Greenway is located on the eastern bank of the tidal River Dart, facing the village of Dittisham on the opposite bank. The estate is two miles from Galmpton, the nearest village, and is in the South Hams district of the English county of Devon. Greenway is three miles north of Dartmouth. An early history book of Devon described Greenway as "very pleasantly and commodiously situated, with delightsome prospect to behold the barks and boats".

Greenway was first mentioned in 1493 as "Greynway", the crossing point of the Dart to Dittisham. In the late 16th century, a Tudor mansion called Greenway Court was built by Otto and Katherine Gilbert, members of a Devon seafaring family. One of the family's ships was named The Hope of Greenway and, according to Sara Burdett's history of the estate, it is probable that they kept their ships moored in the river. The couple had three sons, all born at Greenway. In 1583, one son, Sir Humphrey, took possession of Newfoundland for Elizabeth I, while his brother, Sir John, lived at Greenway. Humphrey and John's half-brother, Sir Walter Raleigh, also lived at the house. In 1588, John was given the responsibility of 160 prisoners of war captured during the Spanish Armada; he put them to work on the estate, levelling the grounds.

Little is known about the original Tudor building, although given the status of the family, Burdett considers it was "probably designed on a grand scale". An archaeological examination of the current house's hallway shows evidence of a Tudor courtyard underneath. Remnants of the Tudor slipway from the boathouse can be seen at low tide.

In around 1700, the Gilberts made nearby Compton Castle their family seat and sold Greenway to Thomas Martyn, a resident of Totnes, also in Devon. Over the next 90 years, the house passed down through the Roopes—the family of Martyn's wife—until it was bequeathed to a distant relation of the family, Roope Harris, on the provision that he change his surname to Roope. Roope Harris Roope, as he became, built what is now the existing house in Georgian style. Roope sold Greenway in 1791, to one Edward Elton for over £9,000. (Note: £9,000 in 1791 equates to approximately £1,170,000 in 2025, according to calculations based on Consumer Price Index measure of inflation.) Roope went bankrupt in 1800; Burdett opines that this could have been because of the amount of money spent on rebuilding Greenway.

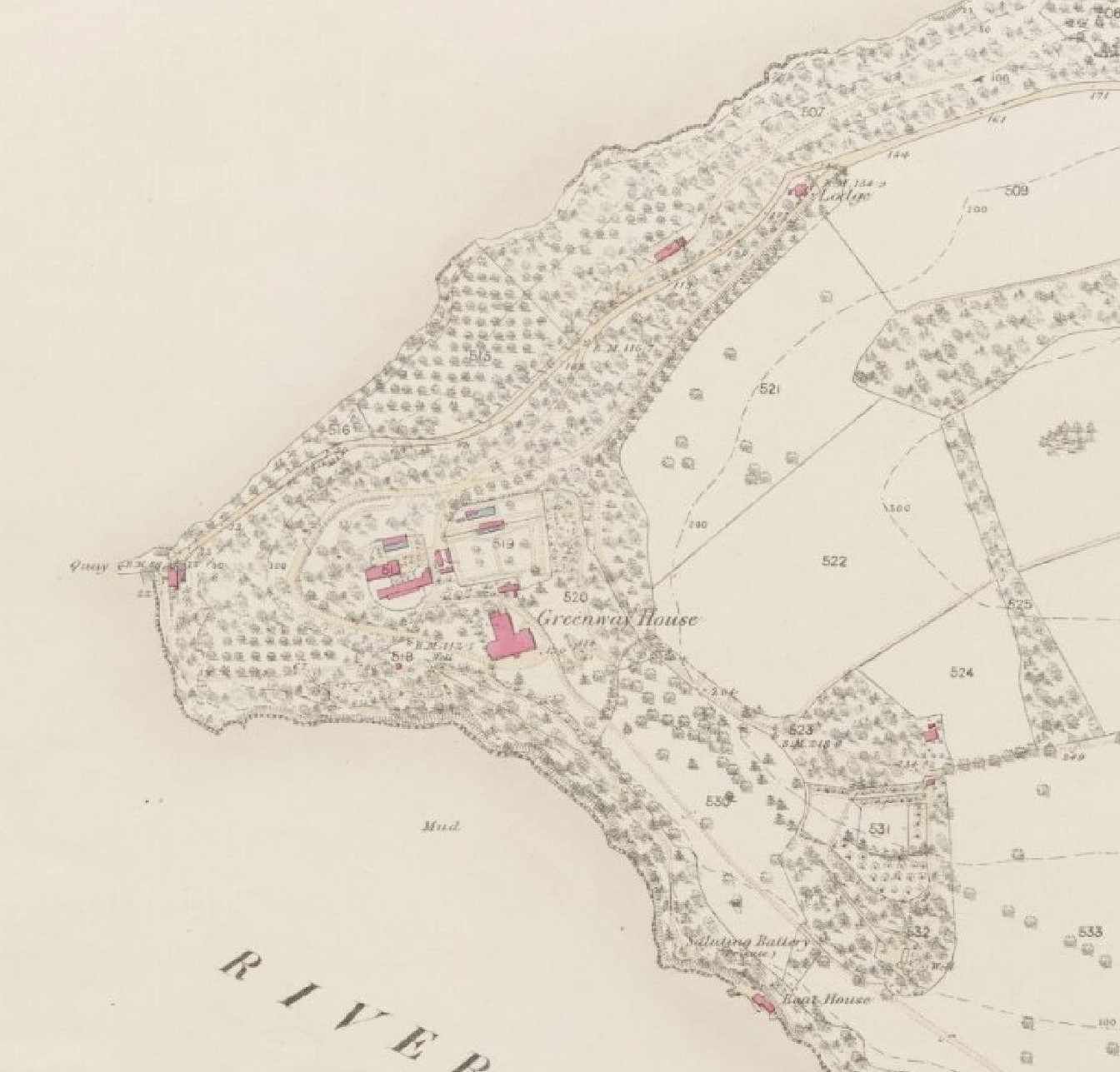
1854 Ordnance Survey map showing the house at Greenway

The Elton family developed the garden, with some remodelling by the landscape gardener Humphry Repton. At some point in the late 18th century the Tudor house was entirely demolished. Burdett considers it was possibly Roope, while Historic England think it was more likely to have been Edward Elton. Elton's son, James, took possession of the house upon the death of his father in 1811, and expanded the property, adding two wings to the house, for a dining room and drawing room. He also paid for a new road from Galmpton to Greenway ferry, which changed the access to the estate. When he sold the estate in 1832, it was much changed, with a large kitchen garden, swimming pool, boat house and redesigned gardens. The estate was purchased, although only briefly, by a Sir Thomas Dinsdale, but was soon sold for £18,000 to Colonel Edward Carlyon, (Note: £18,000 in 1832 equates to approximately £1,740,000 in 2025, according to calculations based on Consumer Price Index measure of inflation.) whose family owned Tregrehan House, in Cornwall. The Carlyons did not make any significant alterations to the interior of the house; but, according to Burdett, they are likely the owners who introduced a rockery to the slope on the east of the house.

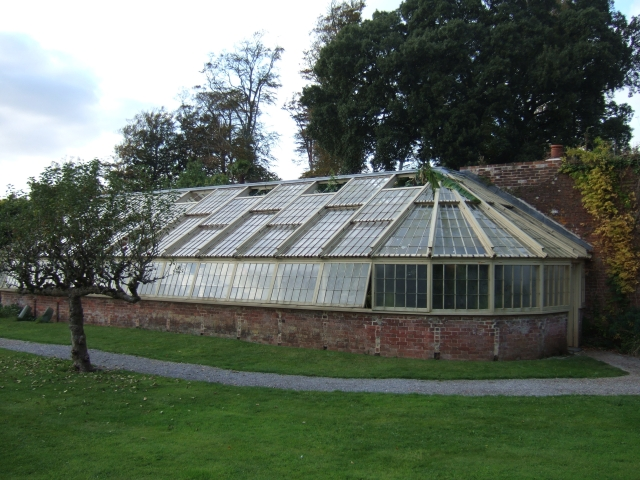
A greenhouse in the walled garden, installed by Richard Harvey

Carlyon inherited Tregrehan House in 1842, and moved there the following year. Greenway was let out to a series of tenants until it was sold twice in quick succession, the last time to Richard Harvey—a Cornish copper and tin magnate—and his wife Susannah. The Harveys developed the estate extensively, restoring the stables and lodge house, installing two new greenhouses and redecorating the interior. They restored much of Galmpton, including building the village school and the Manor Inn; Harvey also acquired the Lordship of the manor of Galmpton.

Harvey died in 1870, his wife in 1882; they had no children to pass the estate on to, and it was sold for £44,000 to Thomas Bedford Bolitho. (Note: £44,000 in 1882 equates to approximately £4,580,000 in 2025, according to calculations based on Consumer Price Index measure of inflation.) Bolitho, the industrialist MP for St Ives, added what Burdett describes as "a Cornish influence" on the gardens, introducing plants such as camellias, magnolias, rhododendrons and laurels. He built a new east wing to the house in 1892, which included a billiard room, study and bedrooms; this was demolished in 1938. Bolitho died in 1919 and the house passed to his daughter Mary, and her husband, Charles Williams, whose family owned Caerhays Castle near St Michael Caerhays, Cornwall. Between them, the couple added several new varieties of plants from nurseries in Cornwall. In 1937, they returned to Cornwall and sold the estate to Alfred Goodson. He split up the estate and sold it off the following year. The house, with 36 acres (15 ha) of land, was available for sale for £6,000. (Note: £6,000 in 1938 equates to approximately £350,000 in 2025, according to calculations based on Consumer Price Index measure of inflation.)

=== Agatha Christie and later: 1938 onwards ===
In 1938, the writer Agatha Christie and her husband, the archaeologist Max Mallowan, were becoming disenchanted with their home in nearby Torquay. The town had changed in the previous years, and the once uninterrupted view of the sea from the house became obstructed with new buildings. Looking around south Devon, Christie saw Greenway was available. She had seen the property during her youth and always thought it "the most perfect of the various properties on the Dart". In her later autobiography she wrote:

One day we saw that a house was up for sale that I had known when I was young ... So we went over to Greenway, and very beautiful the house and grounds were. A white Georgian house of about 1780 or 90, with woods sweeping down to the Dart below, and a lot of fine shrubs and trees – the ideal house, a dream house.

The house was occupied by Christie and Mallowan until their deaths in 1976 and 1978 respectively, and featured, under various guises, in several of Christie's novels. Christie's daughter, Rosalind Hicks, and her husband, Anthony, lived in the house from 1968 until Rosalind's death in 2004.

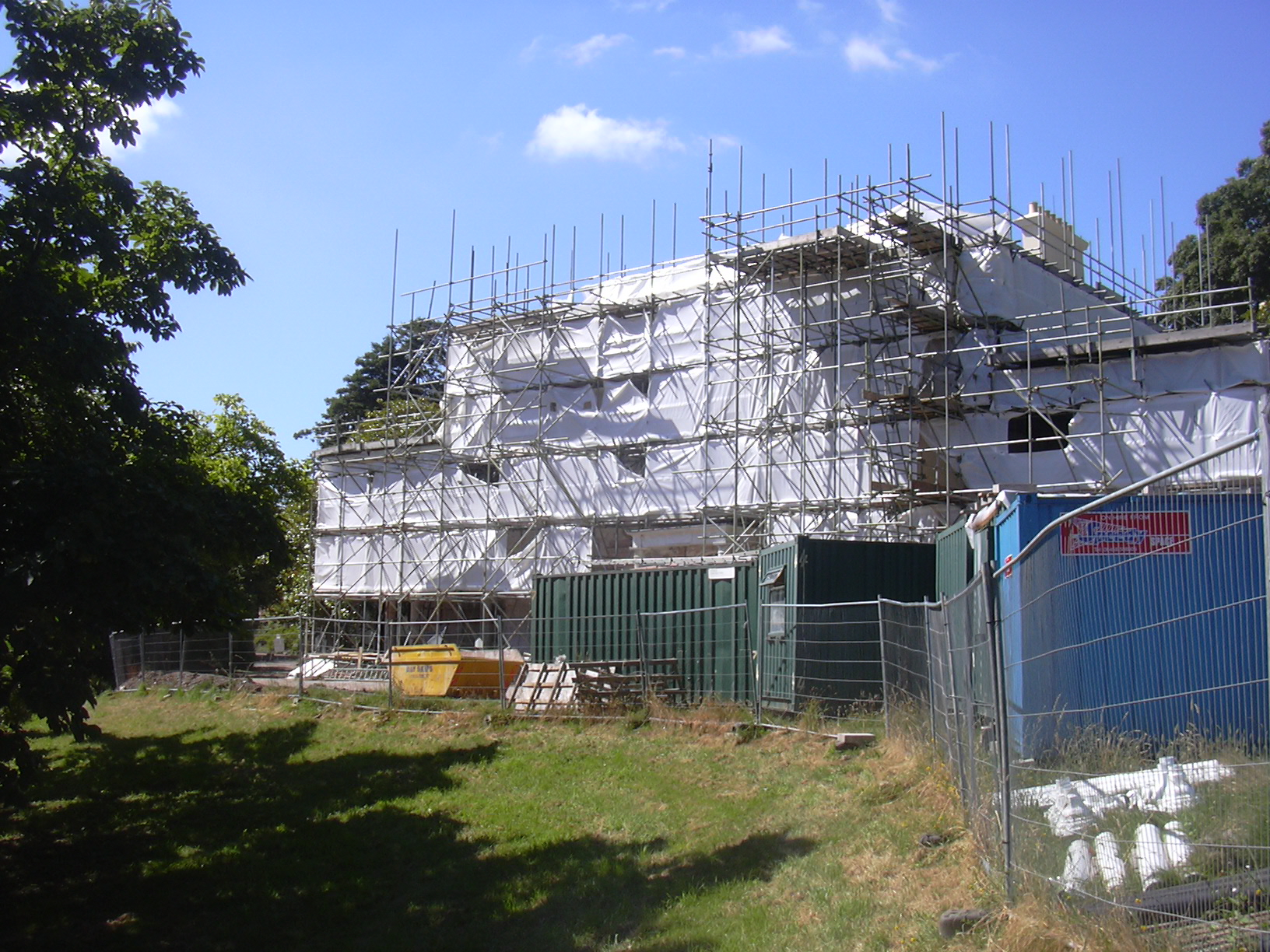
The house in July 2008, under restoration

The Greenway Estate was acquired by the National Trust in 2000 for its significance as a writer's home. On 21 May 1985, Greenway House was made a Grade II* listed building by English Heritage (now Historic England) under list number 1108548. The Pevsner guide for Devon describes it as "tall, late-Georgian, stuccoed". The gardens and parkland are Grade II listed in the National Register of Historic Parks and Gardens. The house and gardens are open to the public, as is the Barn Gallery. The large riverside gardens contain plants from the southern hemisphere, whilst the Barn Gallery shows work by contemporary local artists.

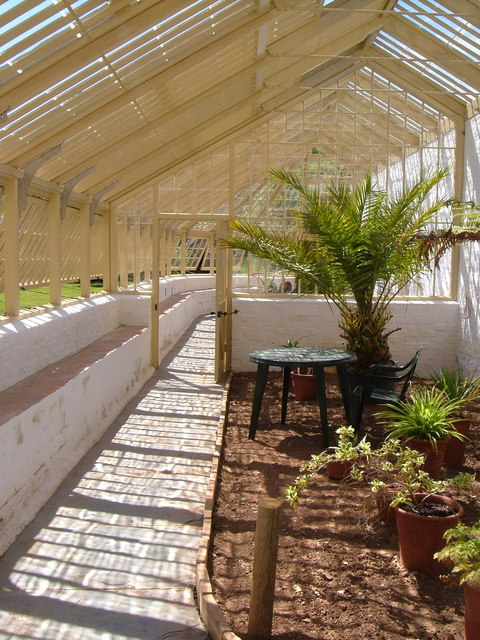
The Vinery

== Inspiration for Agatha Christie's works ==
Agatha Christie frequently used places familiar to her as settings for her plots. Greenway Estate and its surroundings in their entirety or in parts are described in the following novels:

- The A.B.C. Murders (1936)

The character Sir Carmichael Clarke, a wealthy man from Churston, is one of three victims to have a copy of the A.B.C. Railway Guide left by his body. Churston is two miles from Greenway Estate and the station before Greenway Halt on the steam railway line. Within the plot, the 'C' of 'A.B.C.' refers to Churston as well as the character's name.

- Five Little Pigs (1942)

The main house, the footpath leading from the main house to the battery overlooking the river Dart and the battery itself (where the murder occurs) are described in detail since the movements of the novel's protagonist at these locations are integral to the plot and the denouement of the murderer.

- Towards Zero (1944)

The location of the estate opposite the village of Dittisham, divided from each other by the River Dart, plays an important part for the alibi and a nightly swim of one of the suspects.

- Dead Man's Folly (1956)

The boat house of Greenway Estate is described as the spot where the first victim is discovered, and the nearby ferry landing serves as the place where another murder victim is dragged into the water for death by drowning. Other places described are the greenhouse and the tennis court, where Mrs. Oliver placed real clues and red herrings for the "murder hunt". The lodge of Greenway Estate serves as the home of Amy Folliat, the former owner of Nasse House.

Greenway's house and gardens are also used as the setting for Agatha Christie's short story 'The Shadow on the Glass' in the collection The Mysterious Mr Quin, first published in 1930, eight years before she bought the estate.

The house still contains two Jacobean armchairs that Christie bought from an auction at Marple Hall, which she said gave her inspiration for Miss Marple's name.

== Popular culture ==
ITV's Agatha Christie's Poirot episode "Dead Man's Folly" was filmed at the house. The estate is the setting for the murder-mystery novel Death at Greenway. The author, Anthony Award winner and Mary Higgins Clark Award winner Lori Rader-Day, says she was inspired to write the novel after reading that the estate housed children who were war evacuees during WWII.

== Notes and references ==
=== Sources ===
==== Books ====
- Andrews, Robert (2017). The Rough Guide to Devon & Cornwall. London: Rough Guides. ISBN 978-0-2412-7032-5.
- Burdett, Sara (2010). Greenway. London: National Trust. ISBN 978-1-8435-9316-4.
- Cherry, Bridget; Pevsner, Nikolaus (1991). Devon. The Buildings of England. New Haven, CT and London: Yale University Press. ISBN 978-0-300-09596-8.
- Christie, Agatha (1990). An Autobiography. London: Fontana. ISBN 978-0-0063-5328-7.
- Fido, Martin (1999). The World of Agatha Christie. Holbrook, MA: Adams Media. ISBN 978-1-5806-2160-1.
- Gosling, William (1911). The Life of Sir Humphrey Gilbert, England's First Empire Builder. London: Constable & Co. OCLC 752449019.
- Hack, Richard (2009). Duchess of Death. Beverley Hills, CA: Phoenix Books. ISBN 978-1-5977-7620-2.
- Hawthorne, Bret (2017). Agatha Christie's Devon. Wellington, Somerset: Halsgrove. ISBN 978-1-8411-4856-4.
- Macaskill, Hilary (2014). Agatha Christie at Home. London: Francis Lincoln. ISBN 978-0-7112-3563-2.
- "Proceedings at the Fifty-seventh Annual Meeting". Report and Transactions of the Devonshire Association for the Advancement of Science, Literature and Art. 50. Sidmouth, Devon: The Devonshire Association for the Advancement of Science, Literature and Art: 22–51. 1918. OCLC 861227549.
- Robyns, Gwen (1979). The Mystery of Agatha Christie. Harmondsworth, Middlesex: Penguin. ISBN 978-0-14-005228-2.
- Scherman, David; Wilcox, Richard (1944). Literary England; Photographs of Places Made Memorable in English Literature. New York: Random House. OCLC 1014967247.

==== Journals and web sources ====
- "Churston Ferrers and Galmpton" (PDF). Torbay Council.
- Clark, Gregory (2018). "The Annual RPI and Average Earnings for Britain, 1209 to Present (New Series)". MeasuringWorth.
- Historic England. "Greenway (1001686)". National Heritage List for England.
- Historic England. "Greenway House, Kingswear (1108548)". National Heritage List for England.
- Rapple, Rory (2004). "Gilbert, Sir Humphrey (1537–1583)". Oxford Dictionary of National Biography (online ed.). Oxford University Press. doi:10.1093/ref:odnb/10690. (Subscription, Wikipedia Library access or UK public library membership required.)
- "Travelling to Greenway". National Trust.
