= Galmpton, Torbay =

Village in Devon, England

Coordinates: 50.395°N 3.564°W

Galmpton
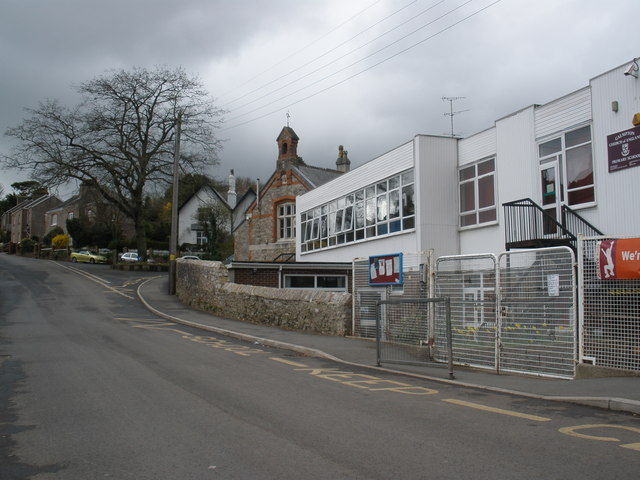
- Primary School, Galmpton

- Location within Devon
- OS grid reference: SX888562
- Unitary authority: Torbay
- Ceremonial county: Devon
- Region: South West
- Country: England
- Sovereign state: United Kingdom
- Post town: BRIXHAM
- Postcode district: TQ5
- Dialling code: 01803
- Police: Devon and Cornwall
- Fire: Devon and Somerset
- Ambulance: South Western
- UK Parliament: Totnes

Galmpton is a semi-rural village in Torbay, in the ceremonial county of Devon, England. It is located in the ward of Churston-with-Galmpton and the historic civil parish of Churston Ferrers, though some areas historically considered parts of Galmpton, such as Greenway and Galmpton Creek, are situated in the Devon borough of South Hams.

Galmpton is bordered to the south and west by a designated Area of Outstanding Natural Beauty (AONB) in the Kingswear parish. Galmpton Warborough common is immediately to the north, and beyond that the town of Paignton. To the north-east are the areas of Broadsands and Elberry Cove on the coast of the English Channel; and to the west and south-west the village of Churston Ferrers and the fishing town of Brixham.

At the 2021 census, it had a population of 7,013, which was slightly more than the 6,378 recorded at the 2011 census. Galmpton village itself is home to just over 1,400 people. It has an older population: the average age in the village is 52, twelve years above the UK average. Life expectancy, and the age at which residents remain free of disabilities, are significantly higher than elsewhere, though the proportion of people with long-term medical conditions is high. The ward constitutes the least deprived area of Torbay with an unemployment rate of 1.2%.

Galmpton has its own dedicated village website https://www.galmpton.org/

== History ==
The ancient manor of Galmpton was first recorded in the Domesday Book as ‘Galmetona’, the name deriving from the Saxon ‘Gafolsman’, meaning a community of rent-paying peasants.

After the Norman Conquest, Ralph de Feugeres became Lord of the manor of Galmpton; it remained a manorial holding well into the Victorian era.

Galmpton had an economy driven largely from agriculture until industry arrived in the 1800s, chiefly quarrying of Devonian limestone. Richard Harvey, a Cornish copper magnate, acquired the manor in the 1860s, residing locally at Greenway House. Harvey was noted as making great improvements to the Tudor housing of Galmpton's inhabitants, which he had called “miserable hovels”, and for making a generous donation towards the restoration of Churston's medieval church, St Mary's.

The Dartmouth and Torbay Railway from Paignton station to Churston (a half mile from Galmpton) was opened for passengers in 1861, assisting the expansion of the village and its industry. The line, designed by Isambard Kingdom Brunel, once ran to Brixham and two of his viaducts still stand at Broadsands.

In the 20th century, Greenway became the home of the author Agatha Christie, who paid for a new stained glass window in St. Mary's Church depicting the Christmas story and life on the estate.

Nearby Lupton House was recorded in the 1086 Domesday Survey as being woodland; the house can be traced to 1408. In 1480 the Upton (in French: L’Upton) family settled there. The present house was built in 1772 and purchased in 1788 by Mr Justice Francis Yarde Buller − the first judge to sentence a criminal to deportation to Australia.

Large numbers of troops were stationed around Galmpton during World War Two. Small boats from the Dart joined in the Dunkirk evacuation of 1940 and the river provided anchorage for many of the landing craft used in the D-Day invasion. Motor launches and motor torpedo boats used in the war effort were built and repaired at Galmpton Creek.

The main road from Newton Abbot to Dartmouth once ran through the village before being bypassed to the north by the Brixham Road (A379).

Galmpton grew fivefold in the 1960s when low density estates consisting largely of bungalows were constructed, replacing fruit orchards. Industry largely abandoned the village in the 20th century and its economy returned to being led mainly by farming and related businesses.

Areas closely associated with Galmpton are:

- Galmpton Warborough, set up in Saxon times as a defensive position to bring together the fighting men of Galmpton and Churston. Later, in 1588, Sir John Gilbert of Greenway led 3,000 militia to Galmpton Warborough in readiness to repel invaders arriving with the Spanish Armada.
- Galmpton Creek, a tributary of the River Dart, now in the South Hams borough of Devon. Brixham fishing smacks and other small trading vessels were constructed here from Victorian times. Marine related businesses are still based there.
- Broadsands and Elberry Cove: beaches surrounded by recent residential developments, now separated from Galmpton by the A379 road.

== Environment ==
Galmpton village is sited within the catchment area of the River Dart, 25 metres above high water. The area includes “agricultural areas of significant landscape value” and farmland covers some 60% of Galmpton. Most fields are used for the grazing of livestock.

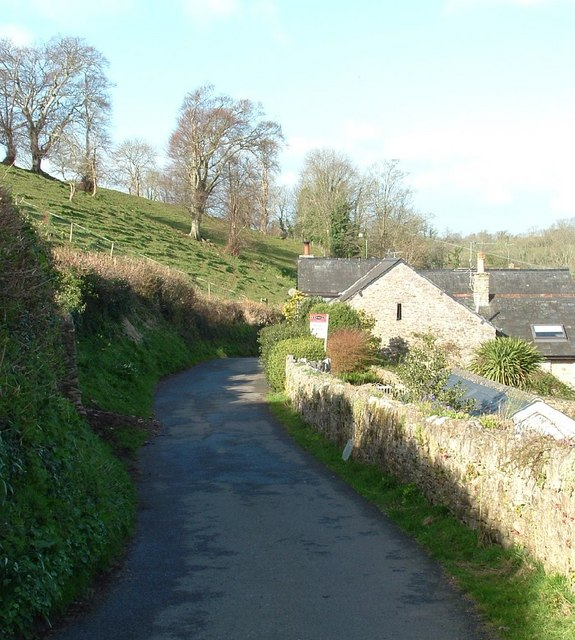
A characteristic South Devon lane in Galmpton.

Distinctive features of the older village lanes are the limestone walls constructed of locally quarried stone, often bedecked in summer with Valerian, wall daisies, ivy-leafed toadflax and wall pennywort; and locally characteristic grassed, stone-built ‘Devon banks’. Wildlife is attracted to local woods and the remnants of orchards. Fauna includes the endangered cirl bunting, buzzards, kestrels, peregrine falcons, ravens and woodpeckers. On Galmpton Creek there are herons, cormorants and wading birds such as sandpipers and whimbrels.

To the west of the village, hills retain continuous ‘green skylines' and riverine landscape protected from development by their AONB status.

Galmpton Warborough, a rare example of lowland calcareous grassland, provides views over Tor Bay and the Dart Valley to Dartmoor, and is protected by Torbay Council as an Urban Landscape Protection Area. It is regularly frequented by some two-thirds of Galmpton residents for recreation, and serves as a ‘green wedge’ separating Galmpton and Churston from the urban sprawl of Paignton.

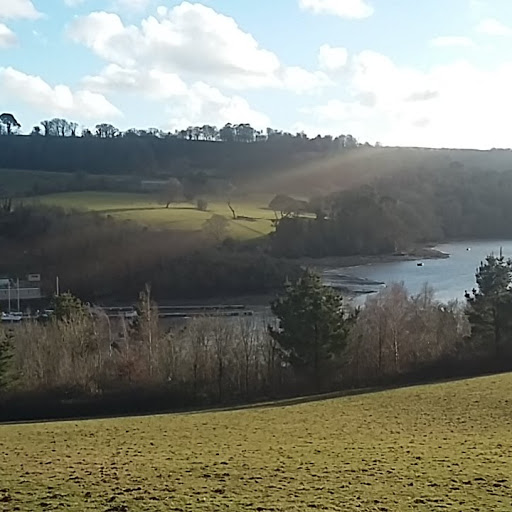
The River Dart at Galmpton Greek

The River Dart and its watercourses, including the Galmpton watercourse, are prone to flooding during heavy rainfall and in 1999 a man died in flooding in the village. Following this incident the Environment Agency approved a £500,000 flood defence scheme which all but eliminated the threat of heavy damage to the village. The Broadsands area is somewhat prone to coastal flooding.

== Culture, tourism and amenities ==
Galmpton has a village shop, comprising a post office and general store and a butcher's. Community facilities include the Galmpton Institution village hall and the Galmpton Barn Chapel Hall, which support a variety of leisure, social and cultural activities; Congregational and Anglican chapels, two pubs, a riverside restaurant and a GP surgery.

Greenway estate, a Grade II* listed house and garden acquired by the National Trust in 1999, is nearby. It is significant as the former home of author Agatha Christie. Visitors to Lupton House are attracted to its parkland, Italianate garden and history. The Paignton and Dartmouth Steam Railway has stations at Churston, less than a mile from Galmpton, and Greenway Halt. Other local attractions include Churston Golf Club, Cayman golf course pitch and putt and Battlefield Live [(a combat game using infra red guns)] . Sports facilities are available at the Memorial Field, and are used by Galmpton United Football Club who have 2 Senior teams and youth teams from Under 8's up to Under 16's. The Adults play in the South Devon Football League and the youth teams in the Pioneer Youth League.

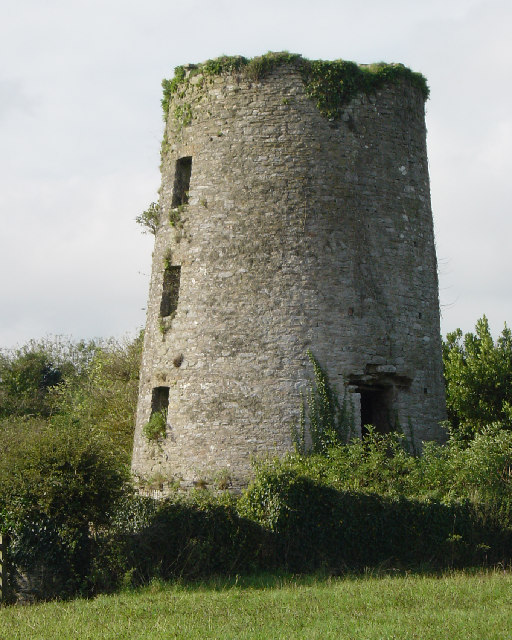
Remains of a 19th-century windmill on Galmpton Warborough.

Annual events include the charitable Gooseberry Pie Fair and events run by the local history and floral societies. The 'September Skills Day' concludes with a concert of seasonal readings and music.

== Schools ==
- Churston Ferrers Grammar School
- Galmpton C of E Primary School

A playgroup and pre-school are run from the village hall.

== Famous residents ==
Agatha Christie was not the only literary figure associated with Galmpton: a blue plaque at Vale House records that novelist and poet Robert Graves lived here 1940-1946.

Birendra Nath Mazumdar, an Indian doctor and GP, who was the only Indian prisoner in Colditz retired to Galmpton.

Football commentator Kenneth Wolstenholme, famed for his phase ".. they think it's all over - it is now" after Geoff Hurst scored England's fourth goal in the 1966 England v West Germany World Cup final, lived in Galmpton until his death in 2002, aged 81.
