= Alfred Goodson =

English businessman and public servant

Sir Alfred Goodson Bt JP
- Born: Alfred Lassam Goodson; 17 May 1867; London, England
- Died: 29 November 1940 (aged 73); Devon, England
- Occupation: Businessman
- Awards: Baronet (1922)

Sir Alfred Lassam Goodson, 1st Baronet, JP (17 May 1867 – 29 November 1940) was an English businessman and public servant.

During the First World War, he was president of both the Officers' Training Corps Selection Board and the Overseas Civilian Advisory Boards, General Headquarters, France. For these services he was knighted and then created a Baronet in the 1922 New Year Honours.

He was also High Sheriff of Devon in 1920/21 and commodore of the Royal Dart Yacht Club.

== Family ==
The eldest son of a London merchant, Alfred Goodson (1843–1886) and Maria (née Lassam; 1846–1885), he married, in 1892, Mary Baker (1872–1946). They had three sons and a daughter.

- Sir Alfred Lassam Goodson, 2nd Baronet (1893–1986), who served in the First World War as a captain in the City of London Yeomanry (despatches) and in the Second World War as lieutenant-colonel commanding 1st Battalion, Northumberland Home Guard. He was also master of College Valley Hunt in 1924, and married twice, first in 1920 to Joan Naylor Leyland (1895–1939) and second in 1941 to Enid Clayton Swan (1985–1986), having no children.
- Alan Richard Lassam Goodson (1896–1941), major, London Rifle Brigade, married in 1923 Clarisse Muriel Weston Adamson (1901–1982), daughter of shipowner John Weston Adamson, of The Mount, Northallerton, Yorkshire, having:
  - Sir Mark Weston Lassam Goodson, 3rd Baronet (1925–2015), married in 1949 Barbara Andrews (1925–2016), daughter of Surgeon Captain Reginald Joseph McAuliffe Andrews, having (with two daughters):
    - Sir Alan Reginald Goodson, 4th Baronet
- Hugh Lassam Goodson OBE CStJ JP (1905–1985), High Sheriff of Devon, married in 1945 June Hunter (1921–2015), daughter of Major Joseph Charles Hunter, of Crimple Brow, Pannal, Yorkshire, having two sons and two daughters (including an elder son):
  - Alfred Lassam Goodson (1946–2015), married in 1970 Rosemary Anne Swales (1947–1988), having (including a son and two daughters):
    - Barnaby Douglas Lassam Goodson (born 1972).

== Footnotes ==
Baronetage of the United Kingdom
New creation	Baronet (of Waddeton Court); 1922–1940	Succeeded by Sir Alfred Goodson; 2nd Baronet
