= 7th Meerut Divisional Area =

Infantry division of the British Indian Army during WWI

7th Meerut Divisional Area Meerut Division
- Active: September 1914 – 1920
- Country: British India
- Allegiance: British Crown
- Branch: British Indian Army
- Type: Infantry
- Size: Division
- Part of: Northern Army; Northern Command
- Garrison/HQ: Meerut Cantonment
- Service: First World War

Commanders
- Notable commanders: Maj.-Gen. Sir H.D’U. Keary; Maj.-Gen. O.S.W. Nugent

The 7th Meerut Divisional Area was an infantry division of the British Indian Army that formed part of the Indian Army during the First World War. It was formed in September 1914 to replace the original 7th (Meerut) Division that had been mobilized in August 1914 for service on the Western Front. It was renamed as Meerut Division in June 1917 and remained in India throughout the war. The division was broken up in 1920.

== History ==
At the outbreak of the First World War, the 7th (Meerut) Division was mobilized in August 1914, and sailed from Bombay on 20 September for the Western Front. 39th Royal Garhwal Rifles went with the 7th (Meerut) Division to fight in World War One on the Western Front. The 7th Meerut Divisional Area was formed in September 1914 to take over the area responsibilities of the 7th (Meerut) Division. It took over the units left behind by the original division and started to form brigades to control them "the 14th (Meerut) Cavalry Brigade in November, the Bareilly and Delhi Brigades in December 1914, and the Dehra Dun Brigade in March 1915". However, the Garhwal Brigade was not reformed until April 1917.

The division served within India throughout the war (although the Meerut Cavalry Brigade was mobilized for the Third Anglo-Afghan War in 1919), initially under Northern Army, then Northern Command from January 1918.

In 1918, the division was responsible for posts and stations at Agra, Almora, Bareilly, Bhim Tal, Chakrata, Chambattia, Dehra Dun, Delhi, Gangora, Kailana, Lansdowne, Meerut, Moradabad, Muttra, Ranikhet, Rurki and Sitoli. It was renamed Meerut Division in June 1917, and was broken up in 1920.

== Order of battle ==
The division commanded the following brigades in the First World War:

- 14th (Meerut) Cavalry Brigade (Note: 7th (Meerut) Division mobilized with 19th (Dehra Dun), 20th (Garhwal) and 21st (Bareilly) Brigades. They are not to be confused with the Dehra Dun, Garhwal and Bareilly Brigades reformed in the 7th Meerut Divisional Area. In addition, the 7th (Meerut) Cavalry Brigade mobilized for the 2nd Indian Cavalry Division and should not be confused with the 4th (Meerut) Cavalry Brigade.) – formed in November 1914; renumbered 4th (Meerut) Cavalry Brigade in February 1915
- Bareilly Brigade – formed in December 1914
- Delhi Brigade – formed in December 1914; broken up in February 1915; reformed in December 1918
- Dehra Dun Brigade – formed in March 1915; broken up in December 1918
- Garhwal Brigade – formed in April 1917
- Agra Brigade – formed in December 1918
- Nepalese Brigade – attached to the division from January 1916
  - Kali Bahadur Battalion
  - Sabuj Barakh Battalion
  - Mahindra Dal Battalion
  - 2nd Rifle Battalion

== Commanders ==
The 7th Meerut Divisional Area / Meerut Division had the following commanders:

From	Rank	Name	Notes
7 December 1914	Brigadier-General	O.M.R. Thackwell	
16 October 1917	Major-General	Sir H.D’U. Keary	
3 August 1918	Major-General	O.S.W. Nugent	Division broken up in 1920

== See also ==
- List of Indian divisions in World War I

== Bibliography ==
- Gaylor, John (1996). Sons of John Company: The Indian and Pakistan Armies 1903–1991 (2nd ed.). Tunbridge Wells: Parapress. ISBN 1-898594-41-4.
- Mackie, Colin (June 2015). "Army Commands 1900–2011" (PDF). www.gulabin.com. Archived from the original (PDF) on 5 July 2015.
- Perry, F.W. (1993). Order of Battle of Divisions Part 5B. Indian Army Divisions. Newport: Ray Westlake Military Books. ISBN 1-871167-23-X.
