= Birendra Nath Mazumdar =

Indian doctor and prisoner in Colditz

Birendra Nath Mazumdar M.D. (1914 or 1915 – December 1997) was an Indian medical officer in the Royal Army Medical Corps serving in France in 1940. At the time, he was the only Indian officer in the British Army, and after his capture by the Germans, he was the only Indian POW to be held in Oflag IV-C, Colditz. After forcing a transfer to an all-Indian POW camp in France, he escaped to Switzerland in 1943.

== Early life ==
Mazumdar was the son of a surgeon, born into a wealthy Bengali Brahmin family. He came to Britain from Gaya in 1931, and qualified as a doctor.

== Second World War ==
Mazumdar joined the Royal Army Medical Corps in 1939 when war broke out. In February 1940, he was posted to the 18th British General Hospital at Étaples. In May 1940, he attempted to evacuate casualties to Boulogne, but was captured by the Germans. He became the only Indian prisoner at the Colditz castle officers' camp, where he was shunned and mocked by other prisoners.

In June 1942, several months after arriving at Colditz, he was summoned to Berlin to meet with Subhas Chandra Bose. There he was invited to join the Free India Legion. Although he was a supporter of India's independence, Mazumdar refused the offer because he had pledged an oath of allegiance to King George VI, and was returned to Colditz. He realised that his best chance of escaping would be to get transferred to an all-Indian camp in France, where security would be more lax. To achieve this, he staged a hunger strike in February 1943. After two weeks, Mazumdar was too weak to leave his bed but remained resolute. After 16 days, the Germans agreed to a transfer. His determination won him the respect of his fellow British prisoners. Mazumdar left Colditz on 24 February 1943.

Mazumdar was eventually transferred to a camp in Chartres. On 3 June 1943, he escaped along with his friend Dariao Singh. The two walked 900 kilometres in 6 weeks to Switzerland and freedom.

== Post-war career ==
Mazumdar returned to the United Kingdom in 1946. He resumed his medical career and worked as a GP firstly in Wales and then in Essex before retiring to Galmpton in Devon. In 1996 an archivist from the Imperial War Museum made several oral recordings with Mazumdar on the basis that these would not be released until after his death. Following his death in December 1997 aged 82, his widow Joan agreed to allow public access to the tapes.
