= Baron Glendyne =

Barony in the Peerage of the United Kingdom

Baron Glendyne, of Sanquhar in the County of Dumfries, is a title in the Peerage of the United Kingdom. It was created on 23 January 1922 for the businessman Sir Robert Nivison, 1st Baronet. He was a senior partner in the firm of R. Nivison and Co, stockbrokers. Nivison had already been created a Baronet on 21 July 1914. As of 2010 the titles are held by his great-grandson, the fourth Baron, who succeeded his father in 2008.

== Barons Glendyne (1922) ==
- Robert Nivison, 1st Baron Glendyne (1849–1930)
- John Nivison, 2nd Baron Glendyne (1878–1967)
- Robert Nivison, 3rd Baron Glendyne (1926–2008)
- John Nivison, 4th Baron Glendyne (b. 1960)

There is currently no heir to the barony.

== Arms ==
Coat of arms of Baron Glendyne
Crest Upon the battlements of a tower Proper a wolf passant Sable gorged with a collar and with line reflexed over the back Or. Escutcheon Per chevron Or and Azure in chief two eagles displayed of the second and in base an eagle rising of the first. Supporters On either side a wolf Sable gorged with a collar with line reflexed over the back Or and charged on the shoulder with a saltire couped Argent. Motto Exitus Acta Probat (The Ends Justify The Means)
