= Francis Hutcheson =

Francis Hutcheson may refer to:

- Francis Hutcheson (philosopher) (1694–1746), Scottish philosopher
- Francis Hutcheson (songwriter) (1721–1784), Irish composer and physician

== See also ==
- Frank Hutchison (1891–1945), American blues musician
- Francis Hutchinson (disambiguation)
