= Charles Stansfield =

British civil servant (1856-1926)

Sir Charles Stansfield CB
- Born: 8 February 1856
- Died: 29 May 1926 (aged 70)
- Occupation: Civil servant
- Spouse: Agnes Helen Sargent
- Children: 3

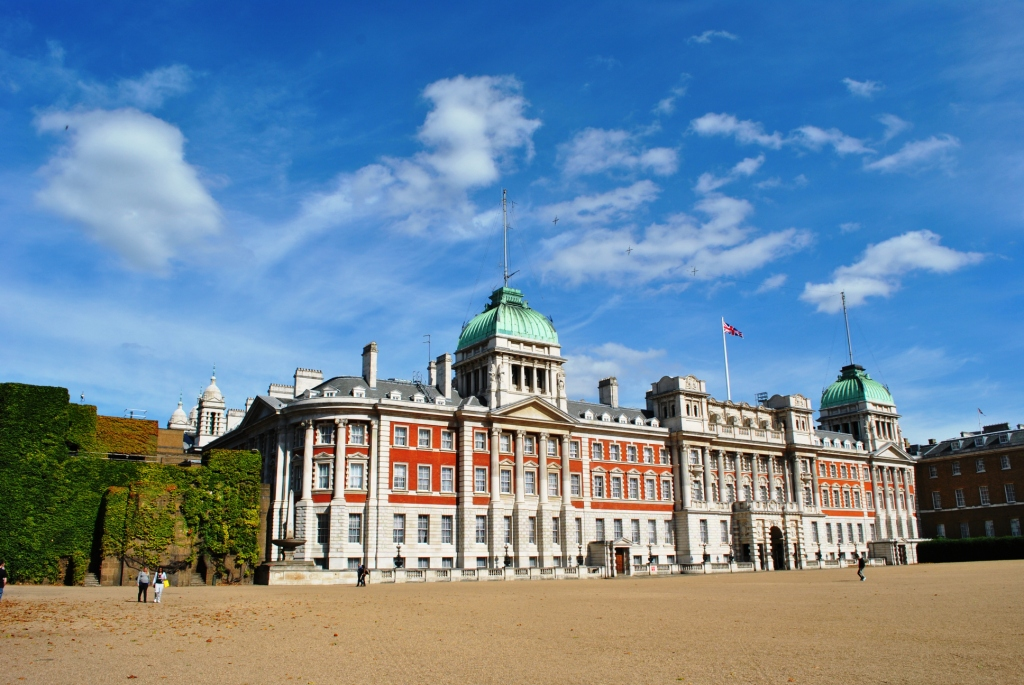
The Admiralty, London.

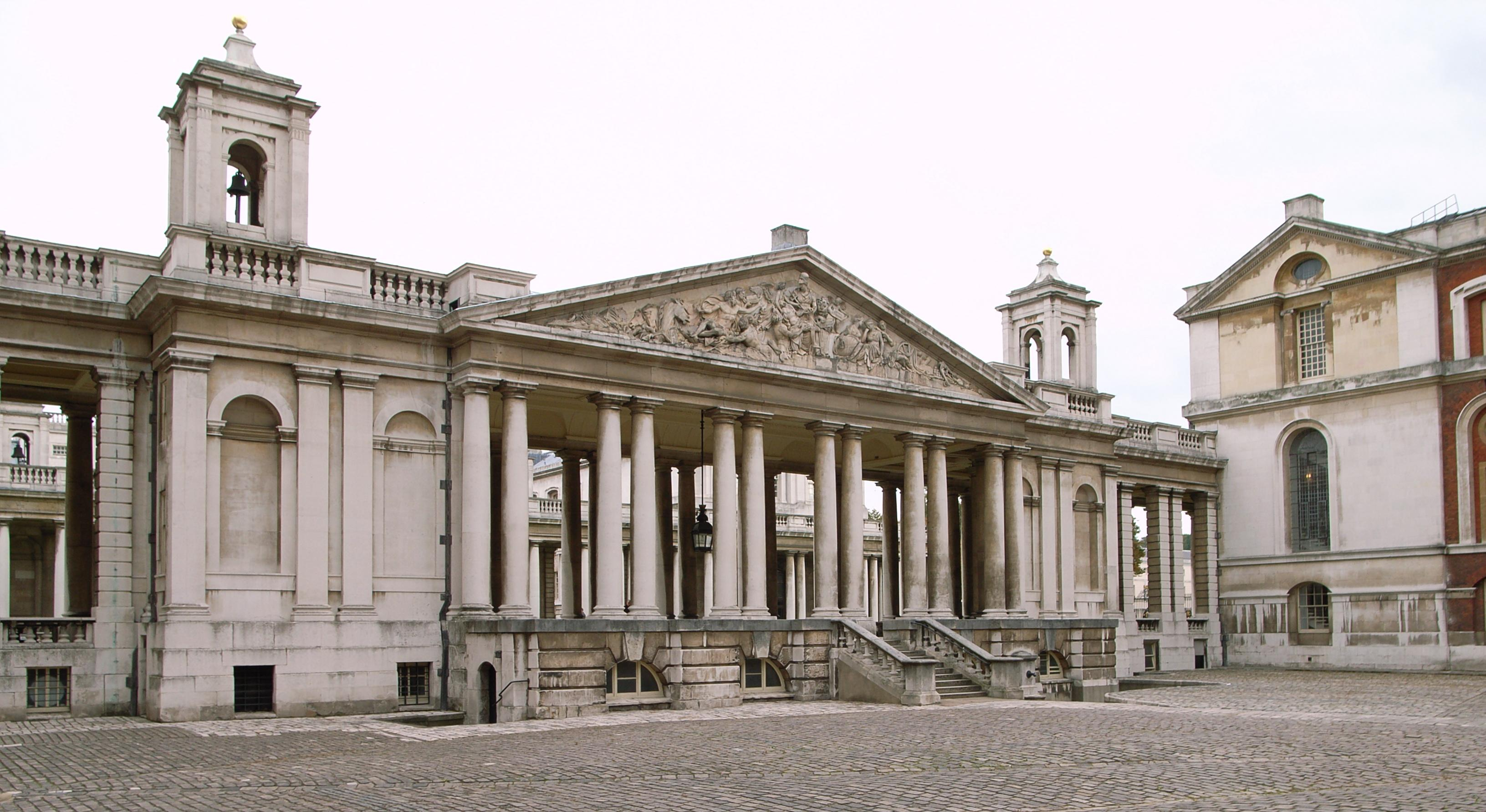
Greenwich Hospital, London.

Sir Charles Henry Renn Stansfield CB (8 February 1856 – 29 May 1926) was a British civil servant who was Private Secretary to the Admirals Sir Richard Vesey Hamilton, Sir Henry Fairfax, Sir Frederick Richards and Lord Walter Kerr.

== Career ==
Stansfield was born on 8 February 1856 and was the son of Henry Renn Stansfield. He entered the Civil Service and joined the Admiralty in 1876. He served as Private Secretary to the Admirals Sir Richard Vesey Hamilton and Sir Henry Fairfax, and the Admirals of the Fleet Sir Frederick Richards and Lord Walter Kerr.

Stansfield was the Director of Greenwich Hospital from 1903 to 1921. He was also a Member and Committee Member of the Seamen’s Hospital Society, a Committee Member of the Royal Naval Fund, and a Member of the Royal Patriotic Fund Corporation. Stansfield died on 29 May 1926 at the age of 70.

== Honours ==
Stansfield was appointed a Companion of the Order of the Bath (CB) in the 1911 Coronation Honours. Later, he was created a Knight Bachelor in the 1922 New Year Honours.

== Family ==
Stansfield married Agnes Helen Sargent, the daughter of James Sargent in 1881. They had three sons: Egerton C. H. Stansfeld (b.1885), Alfred Herbert Brydges Stansfield (b.1888) and Arthur R. G. Stansfeld (b.1890).
