= Oliver Nugent =

British Army general (1860–1926)

Major-General Sir Oliver Nugent KCB DSO
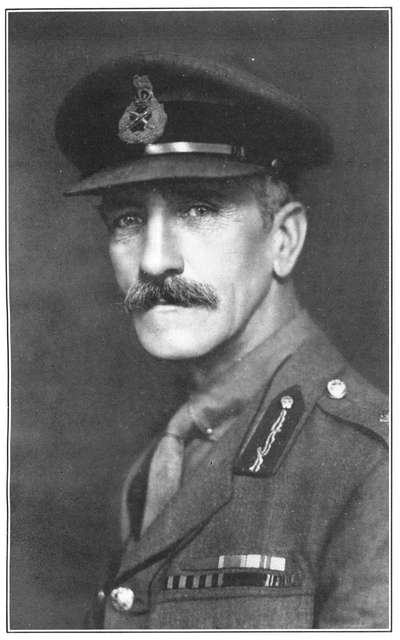
- Born: 9 November 1860; Aldershot, Hampshire, England
- Died: 31 May 1926 (aged 65)
- Military career
- Allegiance: United Kingdom
- Branch: British Army
- Service years: 1882–1920
- Rank: Major-General
- Units: Royal Munster Fusiliers; King's Royal Rifle Corps
- Commands: 41st Brigade; 36th (Ulster) Division; Meerut Division
- Conflicts: Chitral Expedition; Hazara Expedition of 1888; Second Boer War; First World War; Battle of the Somme
- Awards: Knight Commander of The Most Honourable Order of the Bath; Distinguished Service Order; Mentioned in dispatches

Major-General Sir Oliver Stewart Wood Nugent, KCB, DSO (9 November 1860 – 31 May 1926) was a British Army officer known for his command of the 36th (Ulster) Division during the First World War and particularly at the Battle of the Somme.

== Early life and military career ==
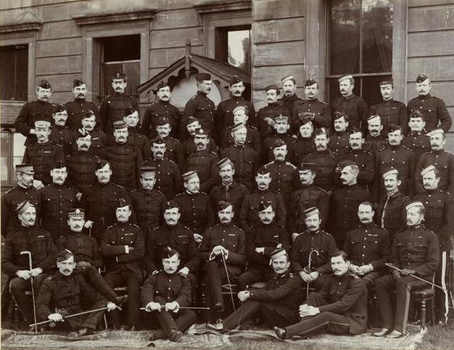
Officers, many of whom later became generals, at the Staff College, Camberley, in 1897. Captain Nugent is sat in the second row, fourth from the left.

He was the son of Major General St George Nugent and Emily, daughter of the Right Honourable Edward Litton, who was a senior Irish judge and MP for Coleraine at Westminster.

Nugent was educated at Harrow and Sandhurst before joining the British Army when he was commissioned into the Royal Munster Fusiliers as a lieutenant on 29 July 1882. Transferring in April 1883 to the King's Royal Rifle Corps (KRRC), he was promoted to captain on 15 October 1890 and served in the Hazara, Miranzai (where he was mentioned in dispatches) and Chitral expeditions, being mentioned in dispatches again and later being awarded the Distinguished Service Order (DSO) in January 1896.

He attended the Staff College, Camberley from 1897 to 1898. Promoted to major on 21 October 1899, he then served in the Second Boer War where he was wounded and taken prisoner at the battle of Talana Hill.

After his return to the United Kingdom he was, in October 1902, appointed deputy assistant quartermaster general to the 3rd Army Corps, stationed in Ireland. In October 1906, after being promoted to lieutenant colonel, he became commanding officer (CO) of the 4th Battalion, KRRC, at the time stationed at Colchester.

He commanded the battalion for the next four years, during which time, in June 1909, he was promoted to brevet colonel and appointed as a personal aide-de-camp to King George VII, taking over from Major General Hubert Hamilton. In mid-October 1910 he relinquished command of the battalion and was placed on half-pay and promoted to colonel. He remained on half-pay until January 1911 when he was placed in command of the Hampshire Brigade, a Territorial Force (TF) formation. He commanded the brigade until February 1914 when he once again went on half-pay.

== First World War ==
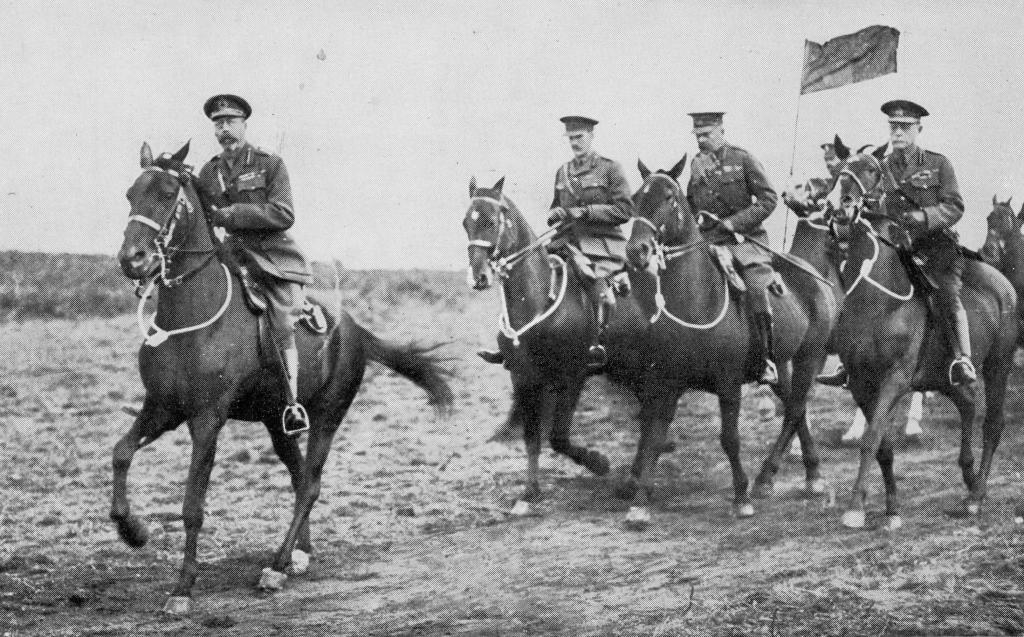
King George V reviews the 36th (Ulster) Division at Aldershot, 30 September 1915. Lord Kitchener rides in the centre of the three riders behind him, with Major General Nugent, GOC 36th Division, to Kitchener's right.

The First World War saw Nugent, promoted to temporary brigadier general in August 1914, serving in England until May 1915 when he was appointed to command the 41st Infantry Brigade. The brigade was part of the 14th (Light) Division and was at the time serving in Aldershot before being sent to the Western Front shortly afterwards.

The brigade saw action at the Battle of Hooge in July 1915. On 30 July, the Germans launched a flamethrower attack, supported by artillery and infantry, forcing Nugent's troops from the front line trenches near the village of Hooge. The 9th (Service) Battalion, KRRC, and other units suffered significant casualties in the intense fighting, with some reports indicating the Germans gained a 150-yard deep salient into British lines. Nugent led counter-attacks, showing steady leadership, helping to stabilize the situation and blunt the German advance.

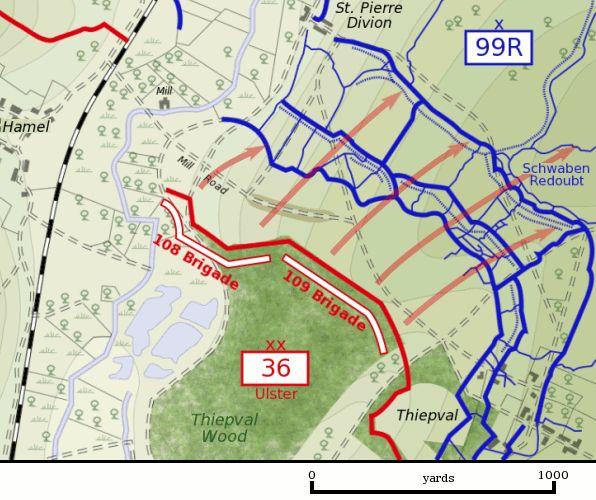
The Ulster Division's deployment on 1 July 1916. Schwaben Redoubt is at centre right.

In September 1915, after promotion to temporary major general, he was appointed to command the 36th (Ulster) Division, "one of the most distinctive New Army formations", in the words of his biographer, with which he served until May 1918, when Major General Clifford Coffin replaced him. He was promoted to the permanent rank of major general 1 January 1916 "for distinguished service in the Field".

In common with several other divisions, Nugent deployed his leading battalions into no man's land fifteen minutes before Zero Hour on the first day of the Battle of the Somme in July 1916. This allowed his soldiers to gain an advantage and capture their first objective, the Schwaben Redoubt. However, the failure of the divisions either side to get forward caused the attack to falter, and eventually the 36th Division withdrew in some disorder.

He was appointed a Companion of the Order of the Bath in the New Year Honours 1917.

Despite heavy casualties, Nugent's 36th (Ulster) Division saw action beyond the Somme, playing a key role in the Battle of Messines in June 1917, where they suffered heavy losses but achieved significant gains while fighting alongside the 16th (Irish) Division.

The division then participated in the Battle of Cambrai in November, and later in the German spring offensives which began in March 1918, where the division played a role in countering this major German attack.

== Postwar and final years ==
He commanded the Meerut Division in India from August 1918 to 1920, and, after giving up his assignment at the time, retired from the army in November 1920 to the family estate in Farren Connell, County Cavan, where he died from pneumonia on 31 May 1926, at the age of 65. He was knighted in the New Year Honours 1922.

Nugent's portrait by William Conor is in Belfast City Hall.

== Bibliography ==
- Nugent, Oliver (2007). Major-General Oliver Nugent and the Ulster Division 1915−1918. Sutton Pub. ISBN 978-0-7509-4880-7.
- Perry, Nicholas (2020). Major-General Oliver Nugent: The Irishman who led the Ulster Division in the Great War. Ulster Historical Foundation. ISBN 978-1-909556-82-9.

Military offices
Preceded by Charles Herbert Powell	GOC 36th (Ulster) Division; 1915–1918	Succeeded by Clifford Coffin
