= Helling =

Helling is a surname. Notable people with the surname include:

- Casper Helling (born 1972), Dutch speed skater
- Dick Helling (1950–2018), Dutch footballer
- Gustav Sving Helling (born 2001), Norwegian footballer
- Karl Helling (1904–1937), German chess player
- Marvin C. Helling (1923–2014), American football player and coach
- Rick Helling (born 1970), American baseball player
- Svein Helling (1910–1978), Norwegian sports shooter

== See also ==
- Helling, Moselle
- Hellings
