= Robert Nivison, 1st Baron Glendyne =

Scottish stockbroker (1849-1930)

The Right Honourable The Lord Glendyne JP
- Lord Glendyne, The Glasgow Herald, 2 January 1922

Personal details
- Born: Robert Nivison; 3 July 1849
- Died: 14 June 1930 (aged 80)
- Occupation: Stockbroker

Robert Nivison, 1st Baron Glendyne, JP (3 July 1849 – 14 June 1930) was a Scottish stockbroker.

Nivison was the son of John Nivison, a colliery manager of Sanquhar in Dumfriesshire. At the age of fifteen he joined the local branch of the British Linen Bank as a junior clerk. In 1869 he joined the London and Westminster Bank, later moving to the head office in London. In 1881 he switched careers, becoming a junior partner of the stockbrokers T. P. Baptie, becoming a member of the London Stock Exchange in 1883. In 1886, he established his own firm, R. Nivison & Co. It became a very successful business, especially after 1891, when it began to act as stockbroker to the governments of the Dominions.

For his services to the British and Dominion governments Nivison was created a baronet in 1914 and raised to the peerage as Baron Glendyne, of Sanquhar in the County of Dumfries, in the 1922 New Year Honours.

Lord Glendyne married Jane, daughter of John Wightman, of Sanquhar, Dumfriesshire, in 1877. He died in June 1930, aged 80, and was succeeded in his titles by his son John.

== Arms ==
Coat of arms of Robert Nivison, 1st Baron Glendyne
Crest Upon the battlements of a tower Proper a wolf passant Sable gorged with a collar and with line reflexed over the back Or. Escutcheon Per chevron Or and Azure in chief two eagles displayed of the second and in base an eagle rising of the first. Supporters On either side a wolf Sable gorged with a collar with line reflexed over the back Or and charged on the shoulder with a saltire couped Argent. Motto Exitus Acta Probat (The Ends Justify The Means)

Peerage of the United Kingdom
New creation	Baron Glendyne; 1922–1930	Succeeded by John Nivison
Baronetage of the United Kingdom
New creation	Baronet (of Sanquhar); 1914–1930	Succeeded by John Nivison
