= Garhwal Brigade =

- Active: April 1917 (109 years ago) to present
- Country: British India
- Allegiance: British Crown
- Branch: British Indian Army
- Type: Infantry
- Size: Brigade
- Part of: 7th Meerut Divisional Area
- Garrison/HQ: Lansdowne
- Service: First World War

The Garhwal Brigade was an infantry brigade of the British Indian Army that formed part of the Indian Army during the First World War. It was formed in April 1917 to replace the original Garhwal Brigade that had been mobilized in August 1914 as the 20th (Garhwal) Brigade for service on the Western Front. It remained in India throughout the war.

== History ==
At the outbreak of the First World War, the Garhwal Brigade was part of the 7th (Meerut) Division. It was mobilized in August 1914 with the division as the 20th (Garhwal) Brigade and sailed from Bombay on 20 September for the Western Front. The 7th Meerut Divisional Area was formed in September 1914 to take over the area responsibilities of the 7th (Meerut) Division. It was not until April 1917 (Note: The first commanding officer was appointed on 31 March 1917.) that a new Garhwal Brigade was formed in 7th Meerut Divisional Area to replace the original brigade. It mainly commanded Gurkha and Garhwal depots, particularly at Lansdowne. The brigade served with the division in India throughout the war.

The brigade continued to exist after the end of the war. It was designated as 70th Indian Infantry Brigade from May to September 1920 and 17th Indian Infantry Brigade from September 1920 when it was based at Dehra Dun. It was broken up thereafter.

== Order of battle ==
The brigade commanded the following units during the First World War.

- 3rd Battalion, 39th Garhwal Rifles (joined in April 1917 from Dehra Dun; left in November 1917 for 4th (Rawalpindi) Brigade)
- 3rd Battalion, 8th Gurkha Rifles (formed in July 1917; left in April 1918 for Kohat Brigade)

== Commanders ==
The Garhwal Brigade / 70th Indian Brigade / 17th Indian Brigade had the following commanders:

From	Rank	Name	Notes
31 March 1917	Brigadier-General	R.M. Betham	
July 1917	Lieutenant-Colonel	A.F.E. Stiffe	
October 1917	Brigadier-General	R.M. Betham	
January 1920	Brigadier-General	H. Isacke	Until September 1920

== See also ==
- 20th (Garhwal) Brigade for the original brigade

== Bibliography ==
- Gaylor, John (1996). Sons of John Company: The Indian and Pakistan Armies 1903–1991 (2nd ed.). Tunbridge Wells: Parapress. ISBN 1-898594-41-4.
- Mackie, Colin (June 2015). "Army Commands 1900-2011" (PDF). www.gulabin.com. Archived from the original (PDF) on 5 July 2015.
- Perry, F.W. (1993). Order of Battle of Divisions Part 5B. Indian Army Divisions. Newport: Ray Westlake Military Books. ISBN 1-871167-23-X.
