= F. W. Hutchinson =

Francis William Hutchinson (1910–1990) was an engineer, and a pioneer in HVAC research.

== Education ==
Hutchinson graduated from the California Institute of Technology in 1931, and received an M.S. and M.E. from the University of California, Berkeley in 1937.

== Career ==
He was a professor of engineering at Berkeley and at Purdue University. At Purdue, he established a solar energy research program in which two experimental solar houses (one with large double glazed windows) were built on the Purdue campus in the summer of 1945. By analyzing this experiment, Hutchinson concluded that the solar gain through the double glazed house was greater than the excess heat loss.

This study led to the manufacture of Thermopane glass in 1946, which is widely used in modern architecture.

Hutchinson was the author or co-author of 178 papers & articles and 14 books on industrial topics.

He was a member of ASHRAE Hall of Fame.
