= Elberry Cove =

Cove and beach in Devon, England

- Beach
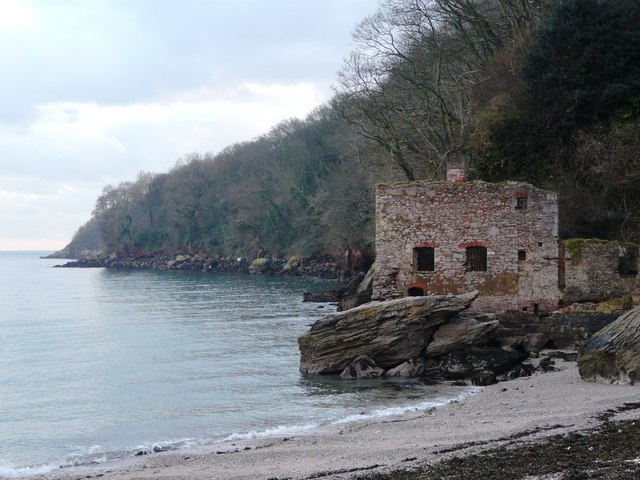
- The disused bath-house at Elberry Cove.
- Interactive map of Elberry Cove
- Coordinates: 50.4025°N 3.5456°W
- Location: Devon, England
- Offshore water bodies: Elberry Cove, English Channel

Elberry Cove, also known as Elbury Cove, is a shingle beach surrounded by woodland and fields, that lies between Brixham and Paignton in Devon, England. It is important for its eelgrass beds, breeding grounds for native seahorses, as well as mussels that are farmed in the waters nearby. It is on the South West Coast Path.

The coast around Elberry Cove is generally sheltered from the wind so is popular with water skiers. A ski lane is provided in the summer months.

== History ==
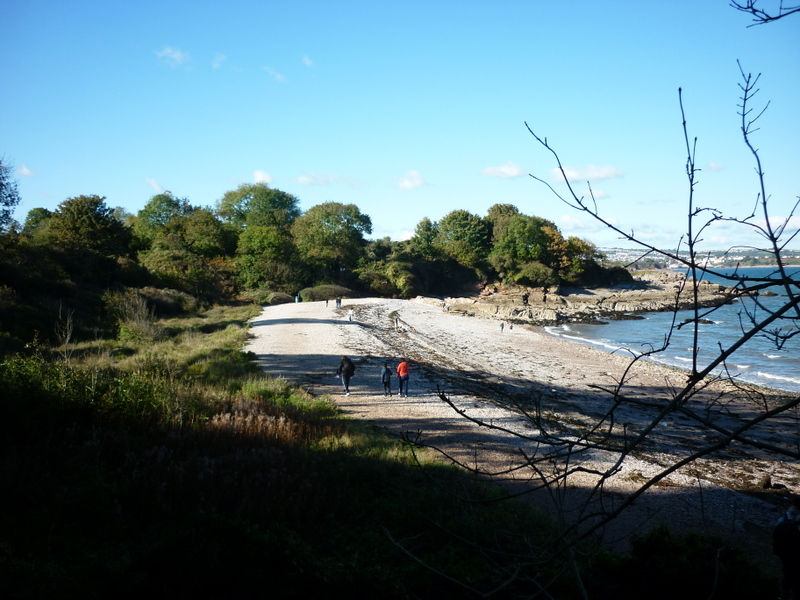
Elberry Cove

At its eastern end are the ruins of Elberry bathhouse, which was built for Lord Churston in the 18th century, when seawater bathing became fashionable after George III took a dip at Weymouth. Standing three stories high, with the ground floor being flooded when the tide rose, the lord could swim into the sea through a gated doorway, preserving his dignity. The buildings also held a "hot-bath" room where seawater was heated and pumped in.

== In popular culture ==
The cove was one of Agatha Christie’s spots, and features in one of her novels, The ABC Murders, as the setting of Sir Carmichael Clarke’s death.
