= Christopher Hellings =

English former cricketer (born 1980)

Personal information
- Full name: Christopher James Hellings
- Born: 21 January 1980 (age 46); Taunton, Somerset, England
- Batting: Right-handed
- Role: Wicket-keeper

Career statistics
Competition	First-class
Matches	1
Runs scored	26
Batting average	13.00
100s/50s	–/–
Top score	13
Catches/stumpings	–/–
- Source: Cricinfo, 4 September 2019

Christopher James Hellings (born 21 January 1980) is an English former cricketer.

Hellings was born at Taunton in January 1980. He was educated at Millfield, before going up to Loughborough University to study mechanical engineering. While studying at Loughborough, he made a single first-class appearance for the British Universities cricket team against the touring New Zealanders at Oxford in 1999. Batting twice in the match, he was run out in the British Universities first-innings for 13 runs, while in their second-innings he was dismissed for the same score by Nathan Astle. After graduating from Loughborough, he worked for Credit Suisse, before founding the consultancy company Bailrigg+.
