= Hubert Isacke =

British Army officer (1872–1943)

Major-General Hubert Isacke CB CSI CMG
- Portrait by Walter Stoneman, 1924
- Born: 28 October 1872; Honiton, Devon
- Died: 12 February 1943 (aged 70); Overton, Hampshire
- Military career
- Allegiance: United Kingdom
- Branch: British Army
- Rank: Major-General
- Commands: Garhwal Brigade; 17th Indian Infantry Brigade; Kohat District; 56th (London) Infantry Division
- Conflicts: Siege of Malakand; Second Boer War; First World War
- Awards: Companion of the Order of the Bath; Companion of the Order of St Michael and St George; Companion of the Order of the Star of India

Major-General Hubert Isacke, CB, CSI, CMG (28 October 1872 – 12 February 1943) was a British Army officer.

== Military career ==
Educated at The King's School, Canterbury and the Royal Military College, Sandhurst, Isacke was commissioned into the Queen's Own Royal West Kent Regiment on 14 December 1892, and promoted to lieutenant on 8 August 1894. He was wounded during the Siege of Malakand in 1897.

Serving in the 2nd Battalion of his regiment, he was in early 1900 posted to South Africa for service in the Second Boer War. Together with 1030 officers and men of the battalion, he left Southampton on the SS Bavarian in March 1900, and on arriving in South Africa was part of the 17th Brigade, 8th Division. The battalion stayed there until after the end of the war in May 1902, and then was posted to Ceylon. He was promoted on 14 March 1912 to major.

He landed in France with the British Expeditionary Force (BEF) and on 24 February 1915 was appointed as a GSO1. He then became director of staff duties and training at Army Headquarters, India in July 1916 during the First World War.

After the war he became commander of Garhwal Brigade in India in January 1920, Commander of the 17th Indian Infantry Brigade in India in September 1920 and General Officer Commanding Kohat District in India in December 1925. His last appointment was as General Officer Commanding 56th (London) Infantry Division in June 1927 before retiring in June 1931.

Military offices
| Preceded by Sir Geoffrey Feilding | GOC 56th (London) Infantry Division; 1927–1931 | Succeeded by Winston Dugan |
