= Doug Hellings =

Australian rules footballer

Personal information
- Full name: Doug Hellings
- Born: 28 July 1944
- Original team: Preston Swimmers
- Height: 185 cm (6 ft 1 in)
- Weight: 86 kg (190 lb)
- Position: Fullback

Playing career^{1}
Years	Club	Games (Goals)
1963, 1965–69	Fitzroy	64 (15)
- ^{1} Playing statistics correct to the end of 1969.

Doug Hellings (born 28 July 1944) is a former Australian rules footballer who played with Fitzroy in the Victorian Football League (VFL).
