= 14th (Light) Division =

- Insignia of the division.
- Active: September 1914 – March 1919
- Country: United Kingdom
- Branch: British Army
- Type: Infantry
- Size: Division
- Engagements: World War I

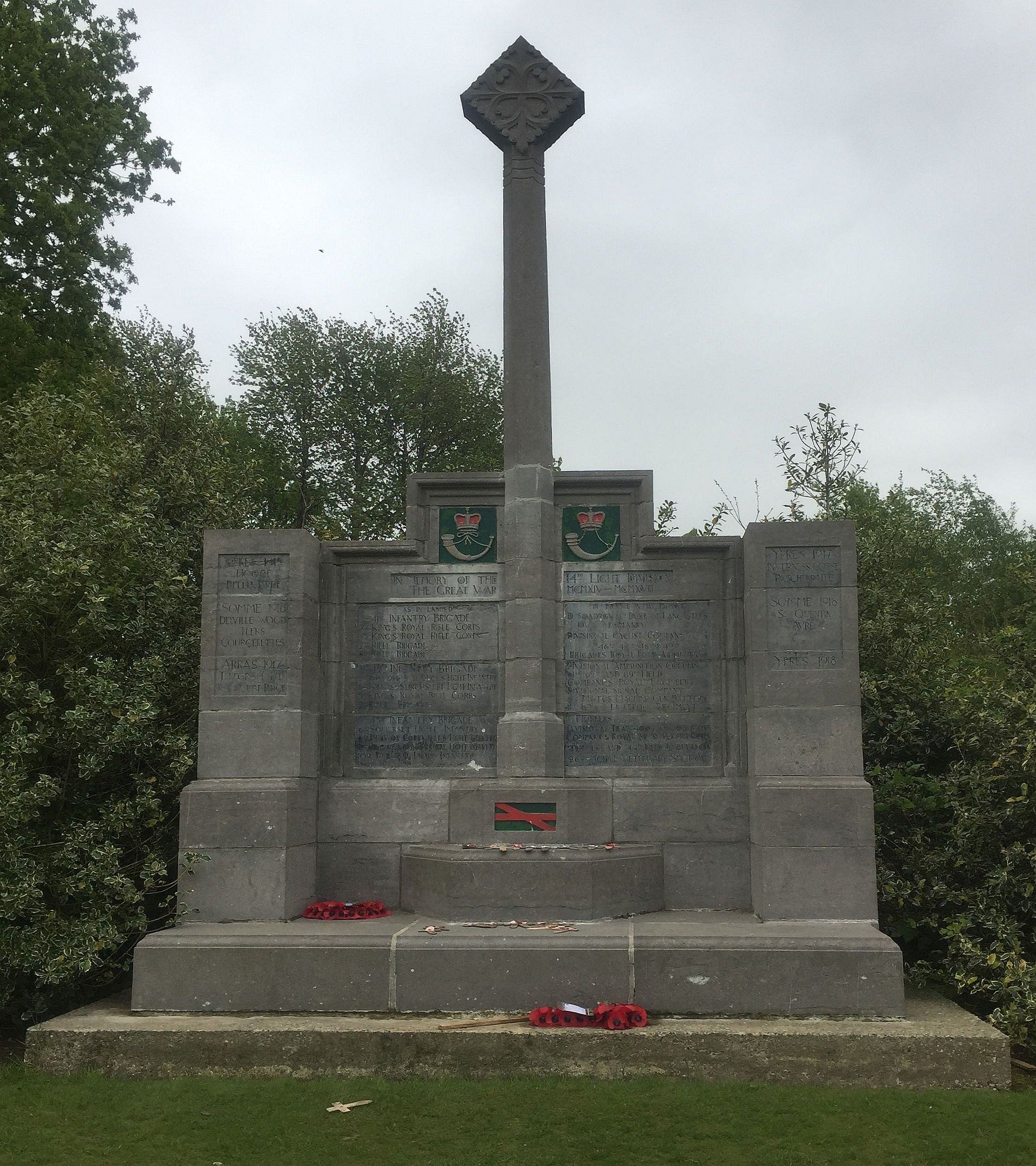
Memorial to the 14th (Light) Division at Hill 60 (Ypres) in Belgium.

The 14th (Light) Division was an infantry division of the British Army, one of the Kitchener's Army divisions raised from volunteers by Lord Kitchener during the First World War. All of its infantry regiments were originally of the fast marching rifle or light infantry regiments, hence the title "Light". It fought on the Western Front for the duration of the First World War.
The division was disbanded by March 1919, and was not reformed in the Second World War.

== Order of battle ==
The division comprised the following infantry brigades, which underwent major changes between February 1918 (the Army's brigade reorganisation from 4 to 3 infantry battalions) and June 1918 (rebuilt after the losses of the German spring offensive).

41st Brigade

- Before June 1918
  - 7th (Service) Battalion, The King's Royal Rifle Corps (left February 1918)
  - 8th (Service) Battalion, The King's Royal Rifle Corps
  - 7th (Service) Battalion, The Rifle Brigade (Prince Consort's Own)
  - 8th (Service) Battalion, The Rifle Brigade (Prince Consort's Own)
  - 41st Machine Gun Company (joined February 1916, left to move into 14th MG Battalion March 1918)
  - 41st Trench Mortar Battery (joined May 1916)
- After June 1918
  - 18th (Service) Battalion, The York and Lancaster Regiment
  - 29th (Service) Battalion, The Durham Light Infantry
  - 33rd (City of London) Battalion, The London Regiment (Rifle Brigade)
  - 41st Trench Mortar Battery

42nd Brigade

- Before June 1918
  - 5th (Service) Battalion, The Oxford and Buckinghamshire Light Infantry
  - 5th (Service) Battalion, The King's (Shropshire Light Infantry) (disbanded February 1918)
  - 9th (Service) Battalion, The King's Royal Rifle Corps
  - 9th (Service) Battalion, The Rifle Brigade (Prince Consort's Own)
  - 42nd Machine Gun Company (joined February 1916, left to move into 14th MG Battalion March 1918)
  - 42nd Trench Mortar Battery (joined April 1916)
- After June 1918
  - 6th (Royal Wiltshire Yeomanry) Battalion, the Duke of Cornwall's Light Infantry
  - 16th (Service) Battalion, Manchester Regiment (1st City)
  - 14th (Service) Battalion, Princess Louise's (Argyll and Sutherland Highlanders)
  - 42nd Trench Mortar Battery

43rd Brigade

- Before June 1918
  - 6th (Service) Battalion, The Somerset Light Infantry (Prince Albert's)
  - 6th (Service) Battalion, The Duke of Cornwall's Light Infantry (disbanded February 1918)
  - 6th (Service) Battalion, The King's Own Yorkshire Light Infantry (disbanded February 1918)
  - 10th (Service) Battalion, The Durham Light Infantry (disbanded February 1918)
  - 9th (Service) Battalion, The Cameronians (Scottish Rifles) (joined February 1918, left April)
  - 7th (Service) Battalion, The King's Royal Rifle Corps (joined from 41st Brigade February 1918)
  - 43rd Machine Gun Company (joined February 1916, left to move into 16th MG Battalion March 1918)
  - 43rd Trench Mortar Battery (joined April 1916)
- After June 1918
  - 12th (Service) Battalion, Suffolk Regiment (East Anglian)
  - 20th (Service) Battalion, Middlesex Regiment (Shoreditch)
  - 10th (Service) Battalion, The Highland Light Infantry
  - 43rd Trench Mortar Battery

Divisional Troops

- 11th (Service) Battalion The King's Regiment (Liverpool) (pioneers) (left June 1918)
- 15th (Service) Battalion The Loyal Regiment (North Lancashire) (pioneers) (joined June 1918)
- 249th Machine Gun Company (joined July 1917, left October 1917)
- 224th Machine Gun Company (joined November 1917, left to move into 14th MG Battalion March 1918')
- 14th Battalion Machine Gun Corps (formed March 1918)
- 14th Divisional Train Army Service Corps (100, 101, 102 and 103 Companies)
- 26th Mobile Veterinary Section Army Veterinary Corps
- 215th Divisional Employment Company, Labour Corps (joined June 1917)

Royal Artillery

- XLVI Brigade Royal Field Artillery
- XLVII Brigade RFA
- XLVIII Brigade RFA (left January 1917)
- XLIX (Howitzer) Brigade, RFA (broken up October 1916)
- V.14 Heavy Trench Mortar Battery RFA (joined July 1916, left January 1918)
- X.14, Y.14 and Z.14 Medium Mortar Batteries RFA (formed March 1916; Z broken up February 1918, redistributed to X and Y)
- 14th Heavy Battery, Royal Garrison Artillery (left 8 June 1915)

Royal Engineers

- 61st, 62nd and 89th Field Companies
- 14th Divisional Signals Company

Royal Army Medical Corps

- 42nd, 43rd and 44th Field Ambulances
- 25th Sanitary Section (left April 1917)

== Battles ==
Second Battle of Ypres

- Hooge (German Liquid Fire Attack) – 30 and 31 July 1915
- Second Attack on Bellewaarde – 25 September 1915

Battle of the Somme

- Battle of Delville Wood – August – September 1916
- Battle of Flers-Courcelette – September 1916

Battle of Arras (1917)

- The First Battle of the Scarpe – 9–14 April 1917
- The Third Battle of the Scarpe – 3–4 May 1917

Third Battle of Ypres

- The Battle of Langemark – 22–27 August 1917
- The First Battle of Passchendaele October 1917
- The Second Battle of Passchendaele November 1917

First Battles of the Somme 1918

- The Battle of St Quentin – 23–25 March 1918
- The Battle of the Avre – 4 April 1918

Hundred Days Offensive

- The Battle of Ypres 1918
- The advance in Flanders

== Commander ==
- Major-General Thomas Morland (7 September – 17 October 1914)
- Brigadier-General Francis Alexander Fortescue (17–22 October 1914) acting
- Major-General General Victor Arthur Couper (22 October – 30 December 1914)
- Brigadier-General Francis Alexander Fortescue (30 December 1914 – 3 January 1915) acting
- Major-General Victor Arthur Couper (3 January 1915 – 22 March 1918)
- Major-General Walter Howarth Greenly (22–27 March 1918)
- Major-General Sir Victor Arthur Couper (27–31 March 1918)
- Major-General Percy Cyriac Burrell Skinner (31 March 1918)

== See also ==
- List of British divisions in World War I
