= Francis Hutchinson (priest) =

18th Century Anglican High Priest Of Ireland

Francis Hutchinson (1703–1768) was an Anglican priest in Ireland during the 18th century.

Hutchinson was born in Carsington, Derbyshire, the son of Samuel Hutchinson (1666-1748) and his wife Mary Jenkinson (1670-1750), and educated at Trinity College, Dublin. He was Archdeacon of Down from 1733 until his death.
