= Robert Bailey Hellings =

British colonial administrator (1853-1947)

Robert Bailey Hellings CMG (16 April 1863 – 29 August 1947) was a British colonial administrator in Ceylon from 1885 to 1921.

== Biography ==
Robert Bailey Hellings was born on 16 April 1863. He joined the Ceylon Civil Service in 1885, and was first attached to the Secretariat. Later he was transferred to the Treasury and then to Ratnapura. In 1888 he was appointed Assistant Collector of Customs at Trincomalee, and in 1889 he was Assistant to the Government Agent at the same place. From Trincomalee he was transferred to Anuradhapura as Assistant to the Government Agent. He later served as Acting Police Magistrate, District Judge, Commissioner of Requests, Colombo, and Assistant Government Agent, Matale.

In 1906, he was appointed Government Agent of the Province of Sabaragamuwa whilst also serving as Fiscal, Collector of Customs and Receiver of Wreck. He also served as Chairman of the Municipal Council, Galle and Justice of the Peace. In 1912 he was appointed a member of the Legislative Council of Ceylon, and in 1914 was appointed a member of the Executive Council of Ceylon.

In 1895, he married Marie Rosa von Vertinghoff. He died on 29 August 1947, aged 84.

== Honours ==
Hellings was appointed Companion of the Order of St Michael and St George (CMG) in the 1922 New Years Honours.
