= Readhead baronets =

Extinct baronetcy in the Baronetage of the United Kingdom

The Readhead Baronetcy, of Westoe in the Borough of South Shields in the County Palatine of Durham, was a title in the Baronetage of the United Kingdom. It was created on 20 January 1922 for James Readhead. He was chairman and managing director of John Readhead and Sons, shipbuilders, of South Shields. The third Baronet did not use his title. On his death in 1988 the title became extinct.

== Readhead Baronets, of Westoe (1922) ==
- Sir James Readhead, 1st Baronet (died 1930)
- Sir James Halder Readhead, 2nd Baronet (1879–1940)
- James Templeman Readhead, presumed 3rd Baronet (1910–1988)

== Arms ==
Coat of arms of Readhead baronets
Crest Upon waves of the sea Proper a galley Sable in front thereof two anchors saltirewise Or. Escutcheon Azure on a fess between two cross crosslets fitchee Or as many martlets Sable all within two flaunches of the second. Motto Laboro Fide
