= Goodson baronets =

Baronetcy in the Baronetage of the United Kingdom

The Goodson Baronetcy, of Waddeton Court in the Parish of Stoke Gabriel, in the County of Devon, is a title in the Baronetage of the United Kingdom. It was created on 18 January 1922 for Sir Alfred Goodson.

== Goodson baronets, of Waddeton Court (1922) ==
- Sir Alfred Lassam Goodson, 1st Baronet (1867–1940)
- Sir Alfred Lassam Goodson, 2nd Baronet (1893–1986)
- Sir Mark Weston Lassam Goodson, 3rd Baronet (1925–2015)
- Sir Alan Reginald Goodson, 4th Baronet (born 1960)

The heir presumptive is the present baronet's cousin once-removed, Barnaby Douglas Lassam Goodson (born 1972).
