= Francis Hutchinson (physician) =

British physician and Surgeon to the King

Francis Hope Grant Hutchinson
- Born: 28 October 1870
- Died: 25 July 1931 (aged 60)
- Scientific career
- Fields: Medicine

Major General Francis Hope Grant Hutchinson CIE (1870–1931) was a senior British physician and Surgeon to the King.

== Biography ==
Born on 28 October 1870, Francis Hutchinson was educated at Bedford School and at the University of Edinburgh. He entered the Indian Medical Service, in 1897, and served in China during the Boxer Rebellion, between 1900 and 1901. He was appointed Public Health Commissioner for the Government of India in 1919, and as Surgeon General for the Government of Madras, between 1926 and 1929. He was promoted to the rank of major general in 1926, and appointed Surgeon to the King in 1927.

Major General Francis Hutchinson was invested as a Companion of the Order of the Indian Empire in 1921. He retired in 1930 and died on 25 July 1931.
