= 1929 Birthday Honours =

British government recognitions

The King's Birthday Honours 1929 were appointments by King George V to various orders and honours to reward and highlight good works by members of the British Empire. The appointments were made to celebrate the official birthday of The King. They were published on 3 June 1929.

The recipients of honours are displayed here as they were styled before their new honour, and arranged by honour, with classes (Knight, Knight Grand Cross, etc.) and then divisions (Military, Civil, etc.) as appropriate.

== British Empire ==
=== Earl ===
- James Lyle, Viscount Inchcape, GCSI, GCMG, KCIE. For public services.

=== Viscount ===
- The Right Honourable William Clive Bridgeman, JP, DL, First Lord of the Admiralty. Member of Parliament for the Oswestry Division 1906–29. For many years of public and political services.
- The Right Honourable Douglas McGarel, Baron Hailsham, KC, JP, Lord High Chancellor of Great Britain.
- Field-Marshal Herbert Charles Onslow, Baron Plumer, GCB, GCMG, GCVO, GBE. For long and distinguished public services.

=== Baron ===
- Sir William Ewart Berry, Bt, Chairman of Allied Newspapers Ltd. For political and public services.
- Colonel Sir Edward Allen Brotherton, Bt, JP, DL, Member of Parliament for Wakefield 1902-10 and 1918–22. For political, public and charitable services.
- The Right Honourable Sir Robert Arthur Sanders, Bt, JP, DL, Member of Parliament for Bridgewater Division 1910-23) and for the Wells Division 1924–29. Minister of Agriculture and Fisheries 1922–24. For political and public services.
- The Right Honourable Sir William George Tyrrell, GCMG, KCB, KCVO, His Majesty's Ambassador Extraordinary and Plenipotentiary at Paris.

=== Privy Councillor ===
- Bertrand Edward, Baron Dawson of Penn, GCVO, KCB, KCMG, MD, BSc, FRCP, Physician in Ordinary to His Majesty The King.
- Major John Waller Hills, DCL, JP, Member of Parliament for Durham 1906–18, for the Durham Division 1918–22, and for Ripon, December 1925 to May 1929. Financial Secretary to the Treasury 1922–23. For political and public services.
- Sir Ellis William Hume-Williams, Bt, KBE, KC, Member of Parliament for Bassetlaw, January 1910 to May 1929. Recorder of Bury St Edmunds 1901–5, and of Norwich since 1905. For political and public services.
- The Honourable Earle Christmas Grafton Page, MB, ChM, Treasurer, Commonwealth of Australia.
- Lieutenant-Colonel Herbert Henry Spender-Clay, CMG, MC, JP, DL, Member of Parliament for Tonbridge, January 1910 to May 1929. Temporary Chairman of Committees. Parliamentary Charity Commissioner 1923 to January 1924, and since December 1924. For political and public services.

=== Baronet ===
- Sir Arthur Balfour, KBE, JP, Chairman of the Committee on Industry and Trade.
- Sir Edward Farquhar Buzzard, KCVO, MA, MD, FRCP, Physician Extraordinary to His Majesty The King. Honorary Colonel, Royal Army Medical Corps (Territorial Force).
- Captain Fitzroy Hamilton Anstruther-Gough-Calthorpe. Has given generous gifts of land to Birmingham City and University.
- Benjamin Dawson, JP, Chairman of the Central Division, Bradford Conservative Association. For political and public services.
- John Wells Wainwright Hopkins, Member of Parliament for South East St. Pancras 1918–23, and October 1924 to May 1929. For political and public services.
- Sir Philip Edward Pilditch, JP, Member of Parliament for Spelthorne Division, December 1918 to May 1929. For political and public services.
- Frederick Henry Richmond, Chairman of Debenham Limited. Governor of Middlesex Hospital.
- Colonel Sir Hugh Mallinson Rigby, KCVO, MS, FRCS, Sergeant Surgeon to His Majesty The King.
- Alexander Nairne Stewart Sandeman, Member of Parliament for Middleton and Prestwich 1923–29. For political services.
- Sir Charles Leolin Forestier-Walker, KBE, JP, Member of Parliament for the Monmouth Division 1918–29. Forestry Commissioner (unpaid) 1920 to January 1929. For political and public services.
- Lieutenant-Colonel Albert Lambert Ward, DSO, TD, Member of Parliament for Kingston upon Hull North West, December 1918 to May 1929. For political services.

=== Knight Bachelor ===
- Major John Dearman Birchall, TD, JP, Member of Parliament for North East Leeds, December 1918 to May 1929. Second Church Estates Commissioner (unpaid) 1923, and since 1924. For political and public services.
- Alderman Charles Hayward Bird, CBE, JP, Chairman, Cardiff Local Employment Committee.
- Captain William Brass, Member of Parliament for Clitheroe, November 1922 to May 1929. For political services.
- Professor Henry Cort Harold Carpenter, MA, FRS, Professor of Metallurgy in the Royal School of Mines, Imperial College of Science and Technology.
- Benjamin Arthur Cohen, KC, Senior Referee under the Contributory Pensions Act.
- Ernest Gordon Craig, Chairman and Managing Director of the New Era National Pictures Limited, Portable Talking Pictures Limited, etc.
- Matthew Pollock Fraser, KC, MA, LLB. For political services in Scotland.
- Joseph Crosland Graham, JP. For public, political and charitable services in Denbighshire.
- (Philip Barling) Ben Greet, Actor and Producer of Shakespearean plays.
- William High, JP, Lord Provost of Dundee 1923–29. For public services.
- John Plowright Houfton, JP. For public and political services.
- Alexander Wilson Hungerford. For political services in Northern Ireland.
- James Ralph Jackson, MRCVS, Chief Veterinary Officer, Ministry of Agriculture and Fisheries.
- William Smith Jarratt, Comptroller-General of the Patent Office.
- Walter George Kent, CBE, Chairman of the Luton Division Conservative Association. For political services.
- William Oliver Evelyn Meade-King, JP, President of the Taunton Division Conservative Association. For political services.
- Joseph Quinton Lamb, JP, Member of Parliament for the Stone Division, November 1922 to May 1929. For political and public services.
- Andrew Jopp Williams Lewis, LLD, JP, Lord Provost of Aberdeen since 1925. For public services.
- Thomas Wallace McMullan, lately Member of Parliament for County Down, Northern Ireland Parliament. For political and public services.
- John Edwin Mitchell, OBE, JP, late President of Smethwick Unionist Association. For public and political services.
- Peter Chalmers Mitchell, CBE, MA, LLD, DSc, FRS, Secretary of the Zoological Society.
- William Foot Mitchell, JP, Member of Parliament for Dartford, January to December 1910, and for Saffron Walden 1922–29. For political and public services.
- James Wycliffe Headlam-Morley, CBE, lately Historical Adviser, Foreign Office.
- Roland Thomas Nugent, Director of the Federation of British Industries.
- Alexander Pengilly, Chairman of the South Dorset Conservative Association. Chairman of the South Western Area of the National Union of Conservative and Unionist Associations. For political and public services.
- William Ray, JP, Chairman of the Central Hackney Conservative Association. For political and public services.
- Henry Sutcliffe Smith, a director of the Bradford Dyers' Association.
- Major Charles Wentworth Stanley, JP, DL, Chairman of the Cambridgeshire Conservative and Unionist Association. For public and political services.
- Robert Mills Welsford, MA, LLB, President of the Law Society.
- Roderick Roy Wilson, Member of Parliament for Lichfield, October 1924 to May 1929. Chairman of the British Guiana Parliamentary Commission 1926. For political and public services.
- Robert Stanton Woods, MD, MRCP, MRCS, Honorary Physician and Honorary Surgeon, London Hospital. For services during His Majesty's illness.
- Francis James Wylie, MA, Oxford Secretary to the Rhodes Trust.

Dominions

- Henry Buckleton, General Manager, Bank of New Zealand.
- The Honourable Alexander Lawrence Herdman, Judge of the Supreme Court of New Zealand.
- Kelso King. For public services to the State of New South Wales.
- James Gordon McDonald, OBE, President of the Rhodesia Chamber of Mines, for services to Southern Rhodesia.
- Professor Colin MacKenzie, MD, FRS, Director of the National Museum of Australian Zoology.
- William Herbert Phillipps, Chairman of the Board of Trustees of the Savings Bank of South Australia. For public services to the State of South Australia.

India

- Mr Justice Shah Muhammad Sulaiman, LLD, Puisne Judge, High Court of Judicature, Allahabad.
- Mr Justice Leonard Christian Adami, Indian Civil Service, Puisne Judge, High Court of Judicature, Patna.
- Mr Justice Norman Wright Kemp, Puisne Judge, High Court of Judicature, Bombay.
- Phillip Cahill Sheridan, CMG, Member, Railway Board, Government of India (retired).
- Arthur Cecil McWatters, CIE, Indian Civil Service, Secretary to the Government of India, Department of Industries and Labour.
- Charles Stewart Findlay, Indian Civil Service, Judicial Commissioner, Central Provinces.
- Jadu Nath Sarkar, CIE, late Vice-Chancellor, Calcutta University.
- Brigadier Edward Aldborough Tandy, Royal Engineers, Surveyor General of India (retired).
- David Petrie, CIE, CVO, CBE, Director, Intelligence Bureau, Government of India.
- Sydney Charles Stuart-Williams, Chairman, Calcutta Port Commissioners.
- Frank Noyce, CSI, CBE, Indian Civil Service, lately Financial Adviser to the Royal Commission on Agriculture.
- William Searle Holdsworth, KC, Vinerian Professor of English Law, in the University of Oxford, lately Member of the Indian States Enquiry Committee.
- Chandrasekhara Venkata Raman, Professor of Physics, Calcutta University.
- Edward John Buck, CBE, Special Correspondent of Reuter's Press Agency.

Colonies, Protectorates, &c.

- Colonel Kinahan Cornwallis, CMG, CBE, DSO, Adviser to the Ministry of the Interior, Iraq.
- Robert Howard Furness, Chief Justice of Barbados.
- Nene Emmanuel Mate Kole, Konor of Manya Krobo, Gold Coast, Unofficial Member of the Legislative Council of the Colony.
- Michael Francis Joseph McDonnell, Chief Justice of the Supreme Court, Palestine.
- Michael Henry Whitley, Attorney General, Straits Settlements.

=== Order of the Bath ===
==== Knight Grand Cross of the Order of the Bath (GCB) ====
Military Division

Royal Navy

- Admiral Sir Sydney Robert Fremantle, KCB, MVO, (Retd).
- Admiral Sir Richard Fortescue Phillimore, KCB, KCMG, MVO, ADC.

Army

- General Sir Philip Walhouse Chetwode, Bt, KCB, KCMG, DSO, Colonel, The Royal Scots Greys (2nd Dragoons), Aide-de-Camp General to The King, Chief of the General Staff, Headquarters of the Army in India.

Civil Division

- The Right Honourable Arthur Hamilton, Viscount Lee of Fareham, GCSI, GBE, KCB, Chairman of the Police Commission.

==== Knight Commander of the Order of the Bath (KCB) ====
Military Division

Royal Navy

- Vice-Admiral Arthur Kipling Waistell, CB.
- Vice-Admiral John Donald Kelly, CB.
- Vice-Admiral William Wordsworth Fisher, CB, CVO.
- Paymaster Rear-Admiral Bertram Cowles Allen, CB, MVO.

Army

- Lieutenant-General Sir Cyril John Deverell, KBE, CB, Quarter-Master-General, India.
- Lieutenant-General Sir Herbert Fothergill Cooke, KBE, CB, CSI, DSO, Indian Army, late General Officer Commanding, Lahore District, India.

Civil Division

- The Right Honourable Sir Ronald Charles Lindsay, GCMG, CB, CVO, Permanent Under-Secretary of State for Foreign Affairs.
- Robert Gilbert Vansittart, CB, CMG, MVO, Principal Private Secretary to the Prime Minister, Assistant Under-Secretary of State for Foreign Affairs.

Additional Knight Commander

- Sir Frederick Stanley Hewett, KCVO, KBE, MD, Surgeon to His Majesty The King and Surgeon Apothecary to His Majesty's Household.

==== Companion of the Order of the Bath (CB) ====
Military Division

Royal Navy

- Rear-Admiral William Munro Kerr, CBE.
- Rear-Admiral Henry Karslake Kitson.
- Rear-Admiral Charles Morton Forbes, DSO.
- Engineer Rear-Admiral Edward Piercy St. John Benn.
- Surgeon Rear-Admiral Henry Cadman Whiteside, MRCS, LRCP.

Army

- Major-General Harold Percy Waller Barrow, CMG, DSO, OBE, KHS (Late Royal Army Medical Corps), Director of Hygiene, the War Office.
- Major-General Charles Richard Newman, CMG, DSO, Half-pay List.
- Colonel William Harry Verelst Darell, CMG, DSO, Half-pay List, late Commanding, Irish Guards and Regimental District, and 140th (4th London) Infantry Brigade, Territorial Army.
- Colonel Henry Frederick Elliott Lewin, CMG, Colonel, Royal Artillery, Northern Command.
- Colonel Winston Joseph Dugan, CMG, DSO, ADC, Assistant Adjutant General, Southern Command.
- Colonel Jonathan William Shirley Sewell, CMG (late Royal Engineers), Chief Engineer, Malta.
- Colonel (temporary Brigadier) Bertrand Richard Moberly, DSO, Indian Army, Commander 11th (Ahmednagar) Infantry Brigade, India.
- Colonel John Cavendish Freeland, CBE, Indian Army, General Staff Officer, 1st Grade, India Office.
- Colonel (temporary Brigadier) Patrick Houston Keen, Indian Army, Commander Multan Brigade, India.
- Colonel John Duncan Grant, VC, DSO, Indian Army, Deputy Director, Auxiliary and Territorial Force, India.

Royal Air Force

- Air Commodore Cyril Louis Norton Newall, CMG, CBE, AM.

Civil Division

- Arthur William Johns, CBE, Deputy Director of Naval Construction, Admiralty.
- Colonel Colin McLeod Robertson, DSO, TD, DL, retired Territorial Army.
- Christopher Llewellyn Bullock, CBE, Assistant Secretary, Air Ministry.
- Christopher Salkeld Hurst, OBE, Assistant Under Secretary, Mines Department.
- John Jeffrey, CBE, Secretary to the Department of Health, Scotland.
- Charles William Loveridge, Assistant Secretary, Admiralty.
- Evelyn John Maude, Solicitor and Legal Adviser, Ministry of Health.
- Colonel the Honourable Sidney Cornwallis Peel, DSO, TD. For special services to the Foreign Office and Department of Overseas Trade.

=== Order of Merit (OM) ===
- Robert Bridges, MA, MB, DLitt, LLD, Poet Laureate. In recognition of his eminent position in the world of Literature.
- John Galsworthy. For services to Literature and the Drama.

=== Order of the Star of India ===
==== Knight Grand Commander of the Order of the Star of India (GCSI) ====
- Lieutenant-Colonel and Honorary Colonel, George Joachim, Viscount Goschen of Hawkhurst, GCIE, CBE, VD, Governor of Madras.

==== Knight Commander of the Order of the Star of India (KCSI) ====
- His Highness Maharaja Shri Natvarsinhji Bhavsinhji, Maharaja Rana Saheb of Porbandar, Bombay.
- James Crerar, CSI, CIE, Indian Civil Service, Member of the Governor-General's Executive Council.
- Jean Louis Rieu, CSI, Indian Civil Service, Member of the Executive Council of the Governor of Bombay.
- George Bancroft Lambert, CSI, Indian Civil Service, Member of the Executive Council of the Governor of the United Provinces.

==== Companion of the Order of the Star of India (CSI) ====
- Harold Lithgow Braidwood, Indian Civil Service, Member, Board of Revenue, Madras.
- Jyotsnanath Ghosal, CIE, Indian Civil Service, Commissioner, Central Division, Poona.
- Walter Seton Cassels, OBE, Indian Civil Service, late Commissioner, Lucknow Division.
- James Herman Field, late Director-General of Observatories, India.

Honorary Companion

- His Excellency Shaikh Ahmad bin Jabir Al Sabah, CIE, Ruler of Kuwait, Persian Gulf.

=== Order of Saint Michael and Saint George ===
==== Knight Grand Cross of the Order of St Michael and St George (GCMG) ====
- Lieutenant-Colonel Sir Maurice Pascal Alers Hankey, GCB, Secretary to the Cabinet and Committee of Imperial Defence, Clerk of His Majesty's Most Honourable Privy Council.
- Sir John Cadman, DSc, MICE, KCMG.
- The Right Honourable Sir George Dixon Grahame, GCVO, KCMG, His Majesty's Ambassador Extraordinary and Plenipotentiary at Madrid.

Honorary Knight Grand Cross

- His Highness Ala'Iddin Sulaiman Shah, KCMG, Sultan of Selangor, Federated Malay States.

==== Knight Commander of the Order of St Michael and St George (KCMG) ====
- The Honourable Charles Powers, Justice of the High Court of Australia.
- Sir Frederick Seton James, KBE, CMG, Governor and Commander-in-Chief of the Windward Islands.
- Hugh Cholmondeley, Baron Delamere, formerly Member of the Executive and Legislative Councils of the Colony of Kenya. For services to the Colony.
- The Right Honourable Sir Malcolm Arnold Robertson, KBE, CMG, His Majesty's Ambassador Extraordinary and Plenipotentiary at Buenos Aires.
- Lieutenant-Colonel Sir Francis Henry Humphrys, GCVO, KBE, CIE, His Majesty's Envoy Extraordinary and Minister Plenipotentiary at Kabul.
- Esmond Ovey, CMG, MVO, His Majesty's Envoy Extraordinary and Minister Plenipotentiary at Mexico City.
- Colonel John Grey Baldwin, CB, Member of the various Commissions set up under the Treaties of Peace of 1919 for administering international rivers.

==== Companion of the Order of St Michael and St George (CMG) ====
- Leonard Cockayne, PhD, FRS. In respect of honorary scientific services to the Government of the Dominion of New Zealand.
- The Honourable John Wallace Downie, Minister of Mines and Public Works, Southern Rhodesia.
- Robert Edward Hayes, ISO, Paymaster General and Secretary to the Treasury, Dominion of New Zealand.
- The Honourable Sidney Reginald Innes-Noad, Member of the Legislative Council, State of New South Wales.
- Major Beauchamp Albert Thomas Kerr-Pearse, MVO, Private Secretary to the Governor, State of Western Australia.
- Stephen George Tallents, CB, CBE, Secretary, Empire Marketing Board.
- William Kirby Green, Provincial Commissioner, Nyasaland Protectorate.
- Selwyn MacGregor Grier, Secretary for Native Affairs, Nigeria, acting as Director of Education, Southern Provinces, Nigeria.
- George Hemmant, of the Malayan Civil Service, Under Secretary, Straits Settlements.
- William James Deacon Inness, MRCS, LRCP, West African Medical Staff, Director of Medical and Sanitary Services, Gold Coast.
- Islay McOwan, Secretary for Native Affairs, Fiji.
- Douglas Roy Stewart, Colonial Secretary, Barbados.
- Oliver Francis Haynes Atkey, MB, FRCS, Director of the Sudan Medical Service.
- John Picton Bagge, Head of the Foreign Division, Department of Overseas Trade.
- Eden Tatton Brown, Director-General of Customs, Egypt.
- Basil John Gould, Counsellor at His Majesty's Legation at Kabul.
- The Honourable Patrick William Maule Ramsay, Counsellor at His Majesty's Embassy, Madrid.
- Hugh Ritchie, OBE, ISO, Technical Assistant in the Treaty Department, Foreign Office.
- William Alfred Rae Wood, CIE, His Majesty's Consul (with the personal and local rank of Consul-General) at Chiengmai, Siam.

=== Order of the Indian Empire ===
==== Knight Grand Commander of the Order of the Indian Empire (GCIE) ====
- Lieutenant-Colonel His Highness Iftikhar-ul-Mulk Sikandar Saulat Nawab Haji Muhammad Hamidullah Khan Bahadur, CSI, CVO, Nawab of Bhopal.
- Victor Alexander John, Marquess of Linlithgow, KT, OBE, TD, lately Chairman, Royal Commission on Agriculture.

==== Knight Commander of the Order of the Indian Empire (KCIE) ====
- Thomas Eyebron Moir, CSI, CIE, Indian Civil Service, Member of the Executive Council of the Governor of Madras.
- Alan William Pim, CSI, CIE, Indian Civil Service, late Finance Member of the Executive Council of the Governor of the United Provinces.
- Sir Mager Frederic Gauntlett, KBE, CIE, Indian Civil Service, Auditor-General, Government of India.
- Charles Cuningham Watson, CSI, CIE, Indian Civil Service, Political Secretary to the Government of India.

==== Companion of the Order of the Indian Empire (CIE) ====
- Lieutenant-Colonel Hugh Robert Norman Pritchard, OBE, Indian Army, Officiating Agent to the Governor General of Central India.
- Khan Bahadur Kutub-Ud-Din Ahmed, late Member of the Executive Council of the Governor of Assam.
- Major-General Richard William Anthony, Indian Medical Service, Surgeon-General with the Government of Bombay.
- Philip Cubitt Tallents, Indian Civil Service, Financial Secretary to the Government of Bihar and Orissa.
- Frederic Arnold Hamilton, Indian Police Service, Inspector-General of Police, Madras.
- Charles Albert Bentley, Director of Public Health, Bengal.
- Colonel Walter Willis Chitty, CMG, Personal Assistant to the Military Secretary, India Office.
- John Coatman, Indian Police Service, Director of Public Information, Government of India.
- Percy William Marsh, Indian Civil Service, Magistrate and Collector, Aligarh.
- James Glasgow Acheson, Indian Civil Service, Deputy Secretary to the Government of India, Foreign and Political Department.
- John Douglas Vere Hodge, Indian Civil Service, Deputy Secretary to the Government of India, Home Department.
- Lieutenant-Colonel (Local Colonel) Randle Harry Palin, OBE, Indian Army (retired), Director of Military Lands and Cantonments, Government of India.
- Major Douglas Pott, DSO, MC, Indian Army, late Private Secretary to the Governor of the Punjab.
- Francis Joseph Plymen, Indian Agricultural Service, Director of Agriculture, Central Provinces.
- Thomas Arthur Leslie Scott O'Connor, Indian Police Service, Deputy Inspector-General of Police, United Provinces.
- Francis Verner Wylie, Indian Civil Service, Settlement Officer, Peshawar District.
- Captain Henry Morland, Royal Indian Marine.
- John McGlashan, Chief Engineer, Calcutta Port Commissioners.
- Measham Lea, OBE, late Chief Engineer, Karachi Municipality.
- Jivanji Hormasji, ISO, Administrator-General and Official Trustee, Burma, and Official Assignee and Official Receiver of the High Court, Burma.
- Rai Bahadur Shashanka Kumar Ghosh, Government Pleader, Dacca.
- M. R. Ry. Diwan Bahadur Gopathy Narayanaswami Chetti Garu, Madras.

=== Imperial Order of the Crown of India ===
- Her Highness Sri Padmanabha Sevini Vanchi Dharma Vardhini Raja Rajeswari Maharani Setu Lakshmi Bai, Maharani Regent of Travancore State.

=== Royal Victorian Order ===
==== Knight Grand Cross of the Royal Victorian Order (GCVO) ====
- Sir Humphry Davy Rolleston, Bt, KCB.
- Sir Edward William Wallington, KCVO, CMG.

==== Knight Commander of the Royal Victorian Order (KCVO) ====
- Lieutenant-Colonel Gordon Carter, CVO.
- Francis Edward Shipway, MD.

==== Commander of the Royal Victorian Order (CVO) ====
- The Honourable Gerald Henry Crofton Chichester.
- Geoffrey Storrs Fry, CB.
- George Arthur Ponsonby, MVO. (Dated 26 February 1929).
- Henry Martin Snow, MVO (5th Class).
- Harold Kingston Graham Hodgson.
- Frank Dutch Howitt, MD.
- The Very Reverend William Foxley Norris, DD, Dean of Westminster.
- Captain Henry Daniel Pridham-Wippell, Royal Navy.
- Lieutenant-Colonel William Stewart Roddie.
- Lionel Ernest Howard Whitby, MC, MD.

==== Member of the Royal Victorian Order, 4th class (MVO) ====
- Herbert Ryle, OBE, MVO (5th Class).
- Edgar William Light, OBE.
- Major Ronald Cardew Duncan, OBE, 2/5 Royal Gurkha Rifles.
- Captain Arthur Stuart Williams, OBE, late Royal Artillery (Dated 15 May 1929).
- William Smart Boyack.
- Engineer Commander John Lewis Deacon, Royal Navy.
- Edward Charles Dodds, MD.
- Edward Cecil Durant.
- Archibald George Blomefield Russell, Lancaster Herald.
- Captain Frederick William Wood, Scots Guards (Dated 3 November 1928).

==== Member of the Royal Victorian Order, 5th class (MVO) ====
- A. D. Jones.
- Charles Luxon.
- Martin Joseph Richards.

=== Order of the British Empire ===
==== Knight Grand Cross of the Order of the British Empire (GBE) ====
Civil Division

- The Right Honourable Sir Beilby Francis Alston, KCMG, CB, His Majesty's Ambassador at Rio de Janeiro.
- Sir Arthur McDougall Duckham, KCB, MICE, MIME, Chairman Economic Mission to Australia.
- The Honourable Sir William Francis Kyffin Taylor, KBE, KC, lately Vice-President of the War Compensation Court.

==== Dame Grand Cross of the Order of the British Empire (GBE) ====
Civil Division

- Professor Dame Helen Charlotte Isabella Gwynne-Vaughan, DBE, LLD, DSc. For public and scientific services.

==== Knight Commander of the Order of the British Empire (KBE) ====
Civil Division

- James McIver MacLeod, CMG, His Majesty's Consul-General at Tunis.
- Richard Rawdon Stawell, MD, President of the Melbourne Hospital. For services to the Commonwealth of Australia.
- Major-General Thomas Henry Symons, CSI, OBE, Honorary Surgeon to His Majesty The King, Director-General, Indian Medical Service.

Honorary Knight Commander

- Sheikh All bin Salim, CMG, CBE, chief Liwali of the Coast Province, Kenya Protectorate.

==== Dame Commander of the Order of the British Empire (DBE) ====
Civil Division

- Gertrude Mary, Lady Humphrys, wife of Sir Francis Humphrys, late His Britannic Majesty's Minister, Kabul.

==== Commander of the Order of the British Empire (CBE) ====
Military Division

Royal Navy

- Commander Harold Gordon Jackson, OBE, (Retd).
- Captain Herbert James Craig, VD, ADC, Royal Naval Volunteer Reserve.
- Engineer Captain James John Cantley Brand, Royal Australian Navy (Retd).

Army

- Colonel (Honorary Brigadier) Francis Richard Soutter Gervers, CIE, (Retired pay, late Royal Engineers), late Chief Engineer Northern Command, India.
- Major and Brevet Lieutenant-Colonel (local Colonel) William Basil Greenwell, DSO, The Durham Light Infantry, Commandant, Nigeria Regiment, Royal West African Frontier Force.
- Brevet Colonel William Hesketh Hughes, TD, Retired, Territorial Army (late 61st Carnarvon and Denbigh (Yeomanry) Medium Brigade, Royal Artillery, Territorial Army).
- Colonel John Leonard Jesse, CMG, DSO (late Royal Army Service Corps), Assistant Director of Transport, War Office.
- Colonel John Carysfort Loch, Indian Army, Director of Military Prisons and Detention Barracks, India.
- Colonel (temporary Brigadier) Gerald Steuart Palmer, Indian Army, Judge Advocate General in India.
- Colonel Geoffrey Robert Pridham, DSO, OBE (late Royal Engineers), President, Royal Engineer Board.
- Colonel Arthur Hunt Safford, VHS (late Royal Army Medical Corps), Assistant Director of Medical Services, Baluchistan District, India.
- The Reverend Ernest Hayford Thorold, OBE, MA, KHC, Chaplain to the Forces, 1st Class, Royal Army Chaplains' Department, Assistant Chaplain General, Southern Command.

Civil Division

- Robert Wynne Bankes, lately Private Secretary to the Lord Chancellor and Deputy Sergeant-at-Arms, House of Lords.
- Frederic William Charles Dean, OBE, Superintendent, Royal Gun and Carriage Factories, Woolwich.
- Annie Warren Gill, RRC, lately Lady Superintendent of Nurses in Edinburgh Royal Infirmary and President of the College of Nursing.
- Ernest Kessell, Honorary Secretary, Honorary Treasurer and Honorary Organiser of Pearson's Fresh Air Fund, Treasurer and General Superintendent of St Dunstans.
- Captain Albert Larking, Secretary of the Early Closing Association.
- Reginald Raoul Lemprière, lately Jurat of the Royal Court of Jersey.
- Major Alfred Alexander Oliver, Clerk to the Special Commissioners of Income Tax.
- Charles Pascall, JP, Alderman of the Hammersmith Metropolitan Borough Council.
- The Honourable Mary Ada Pickford. For public services.
- Margaret Edith Reay, JP. For social services in the County of Essex and particularly in Southend-on-Sea.
- Professor Frank Tillyard, MA, MCom, Chairman of various Trade Boards, and lately Chairman of the Birmingham Court of Referees, Professor of Commercial Law, University of Birmingham.
- Irene Mary Bewick Ward. For political and public services.
- James Douglas Craig, OBE, Deputy Civil Secretary to the Sudan Government.
- Henry Montgomery Grove, late Consul-General in Tallinn.
- Clarence Keith Marshall Martin, a leading member of the British community in Yokohama.
- George Sinclair Moss, MBE, one of His Majesty's Consuls in China.
- Nicola Robin Udal, Assistant Director of Education and Warden of Gordon College, Khartoum.
- Norris Garrett Bell, lately First Commissioner, Commonwealth Railways, Commonwealth of Australia.
- Ernest Thomas Hall, Comptroller General of Customs, Commonwealth of Australia.
- Harry Sinclair Hopkins, OBE, for services to Southern Rhodesia.
- Donald Mackenzie MacRae, MD, Principal Medical Officer, Bechuanaland Protectorate.
- Gother Victor Fyers Mann, Director of the National Art Gallery of New South Wales.
- Colonel Charles Edward Merrett, VD, Chairman of the National Council of the Rifle Association, Commonwealth of Australia.
- Stephen Henry Smith, Director of Education, State of New South Wales.
- John Varnell Tillett, Crown Solicitor, State of New South Wales.
- Nicholas White, Chief Engineer, and Secretary to the Government of the Punjab, Irrigation Branch.
- Lieutenant-Colonel John William Watson, CIE, Indian Medical Service, Civil Surgeon, Ajmer, and Chief Medical Officer, Rajputana and Ajmer-Merwara.
- Claude Hatherley Dobree, OBE, Treasurer and Commissioner of Taxes, Northern Rhodesia.
- Thomas Edward Dutton, General Manager, Government Railway, Ceylon.
- Edward Wilmot Francis Gilman, Controller of Labour, Straits Settlements and Federated Malay States.
- Patrick Nicholas Hill Jones, OBE, MICE, Director of Public Works, Bermuda.
- Lieutenant-Colonel Frederick Johnson McCall, MC, MRCVS, Director of Veterinary Services, Tanganyika Territory.
- Captain Robert Sutherland Rattray, MBE. For services as Government Anthropologist in the Gold Coast and to aviation in West Africa.

==== Officer of the Order of the British Empire (OBE) ====
Military Division

Royal Navy

- Commander Ralph Wilmot Wilkinson.
- Lieutenant-Commander William Vaughan, MBE, (Retd).
- Engineer Commander George Edward McEwen.
- Surgeon Commander Frank Lewis Smith.
- Paymaster Commander Arthur Foster Strickland.
- Commander Joshua Geoffrey Saunders, RD, Royal Naval Reserve (Retd).

Army

- Captain Arthur Wilfred Adams, Indian Army Service Corps.
- Major Henry Allen, Royal Army Veterinary Corps, Veterinary Officer, Remount Depot, Mona, India.
- Captain Aubrey Herbert Badcock, MC, Ordnance Executive Officer, 2nd Class, Royal Army Ordnance Corps.
- Captain (Quartermaster) Ernest Herbert Beeton, 146th (West Riding) Field Ambulance, Royal Army Medical Corps, Territorial Army.
- Major Lionel Carrington Bostock, MC, The Manchester Regiment, late Officer Commanding, Equatorial Corps, Sudan Defence Force.
- Temporary Captain Terence Marshall Brick, Supply and Transport Department (Kenya), The King's African Rifles.
- Lieutenant-Colonel Ivan Pringle Brickman, Staff Paymaster, Royal Army Pay Corps.
- Major Douglas Gordon Cheyne, MC, MD, Royal Army Medical Corps, Deputy Assistant Director of Hygiene, China Command.
- Major Frederick Gordon Dalziel Colman 98th (Surrey and Sussex Yeomanry, Queen Mary's) Field Brigade, Royal Artillery, Territorial Army.
- Captain Keith Cyril Darlington Dawson, MBE, 4th Battalion (Wilde's), 13th Frontier Force Regiment, Indian Army, Aide-de-Camp to His Excellency The Commander-in-Chief in India.
- Captain and Brevet Major Ralph Havelock Lewis Fink, MC, The Cheshire Regiment, Headquarters Staff, Iraq Army.
- Captain Albert Furley, MC, The Gloucestershire Regiment, attached 10th Battalion, 18th Royal Garhwal Rifles, Indian Army, late Adjutant and Quartermaster, Pachmarhi Wing, Small Arms School, India (since transferred to the Special List of Quartermasters, Indian Army).
- Captain (Quartermaster) Walter Gardham, TD, 7th Battalion (Leeds Rifles), The West Yorkshire Regiment (The Prince of Wales's Own), Territorial Army.
- Captain Peter Fife Auchinachie Grant, MB, Indian Medical Service.
- Captain (Quartermaster) James Hanley, 1st Battalion, The Royal Warwickshire Regiment.
- Captain (Director of Music) Charles Hazard Hassell, Retired Pay, late Irish Guards.
- Captain (Quartermaster) Ralph Archibald Hogarth, 4th Battalion, The Royal Berkshire Regiment (Princess Charlotte of Wales's), Territorial Army.
- Captain Geoffrey Reddaway King, MC, The Leicestershire Regiment and 4th (Uganda) Battalion, The King's African Rifles.
- Major Arthur Alfred Lermit, VD, Officer Commanding, Malacca Volunteer Corps, Straits Settlements.
- Captain Richard Alston Hale Lewin, Extra Regimentally Employed List, late Royal Engineers, Instructor, School of Electric Lighting, Gosport.
- Lieutenant-Colonel Herbert Timbrell McClellan, Retired Pay, Assistant Officer, Royal Tank Corps, Record and Pay Office.
- Major Richard Stephen Tynte Moore, 12th Royal Lancers (Prince of Wales's).
- Captain Frederick William Nicholls, MBE, Royal Corps of Signals, General Staff Officer, 3rd Grade, Army Headquarters, India.
- The Reverend John James Evans O'Malley, MA, Chaplain to the Forces, 2nd Class, Royal Army Chaplains' Department.
- Lieutenant-Colonel Alfred Henry Peyton, Indian Army Service Corps, late Deputy Assistant Director of Supplies and Transport, Zhob (Independent) Brigade Area.
- Major Charles Constantine Phipps, MC, Royal Engineers, Deputy Assistant Director of Works, War Office.
- Major Wallace Edward Colin Pickthall, Ordnance Officer, 3rd Class, Royal Army Ordnance Corps.
- Major John Clark Pyper, MB, Indian Medical Service, late Medical Officer, Equitation School, Saugor, India.
- Major James John Saunders, Officer Commanding, Penang and Province Wellesley Volunteer Corps, Straits Settlements.
- Major Charles Frederick Sharp, 42nd (East Lancashire) Divisional Ordnance Company, Royal Army Ordnance Corps, Territorial Army, Deputy Assistant Director of Ordnance Services, 42nd (East Lancashire) Division.
- Lieutenant Claude Roland Smith, Territorial Army Reserve of Officers, lately local Captain and Quartermaster, Gold Coast Regiment, Royal West African Frontier Force.
- Major and Brevet Lieutenant-Colonel Frederick John Marrian Stratton, DSO, TD, Cambridge University Contingent, Officers' Training Corps.
- Major Thomas Harrison Wand-Tetley, The Wiltshire Regiment (Duke of Edinburgh's), Superintendent, Physical Training, Eastern Command.
- The Reverend Clarence Charles a'Beckett Thacker, MA, LLB, Chaplain to the Forces, 4th Class, Royal Army Chaplains' Department, Assistant Chaplain, Tower of London and Millbank Hospital.
- Major Lionel Henry Tinney, 3rd Sikh Pioneers, Indian Army, Commandant, Army School of Physical Training, Ambala, India.
- Major Nicholas Hugh Lawrence Watts, 1st Battalion, 8th Punjab Regiment, Indian Army.
- Captain Samuel Hamilton Woods, The Army Dental Corps.

Royal Air Force

- Wing Commander Kenneth Caron Buss.
- Squadron-Leader (Honorary Wing Commander) Edgar Huntley, MB, BS.
- Squadron Leader Robert Dickinson Oxland.

Civil Division

- George Ashton, Administrative Officer for Non-effective questions, India Office.
- Major Thomas Clifford Aveling, MInstCE, MInstAE, Chairman of the Birmingham Pension Hospitals Committee.
- Major George Douglas Baillie Hamilton, Second-in-Command, Army Vocational Training Centre, Hounslow.
- Charles Lemuel Thomas Beeching, Secretary of the Institute of Certificated Grocers, Member of the Retail Grocers Advisory Sub-Committee, Empire Marketing Board.
- Ambrose Joseph Biggs, MBE, Director of Printing Works, Stationery Office.
- Madeline Dorothy Brock, MA, LittD, Headmistress, Mary Datchelor School, Camberwell.
- Harold Brown, Principal Officer, Plant and Animal Products Department, Imperial Institute.
- Thomas Cameron, Secretary, Glasgow Chamber of Commerce.
- Ethel Maud de la Cour, MBE, JP, Principal, Edinburgh School of Cookery and Domestic Economy.
- Florence Ada Coxon. For public and political services in East Anglia.
- Alan David Erskine, Officer for Light Railway Work, Ministry of Transport.
- Samuel James Evans, MA, Headmaster, County (Secondary) School, Llangefni, Anglesey.
- Harry Percy Flatau, Chairman of Tottenham Local Employment Committee.
- John Claud Fortescue Fryer, Director, Ministry of Agriculture and Fisheries Pathological Laboratory, Harpenden.
- Alice Sophia Gregory, Honorary Secretary of the British Hospital for Mothers and Babies, Woolwich.
- John Headley Byers Gunning, Solicitor to the Ministry of Finance, Northern Ireland.
- George Du Heaume, Chief Accountant and Local Auditor, Scottish Command.
- John Charles Kew, MBE, JP, Chairman of the Executive Committee of the Newark Conservative Association 1922–27. For political and public services.
- William Joseph L'Amie, Higher Collector, Board of Customs and Excise.
- Rose Leonora Monkhouse, Staff Inspector of Training Colleges, Board of Education.
- Maria Elizabeth Nevile, MBE, Chairman of the Lincoln Women's Unionist Association. For political and public services.
- John Ray, Deputy Divisional Controller, Ministry of Labour.
- Alexander Robertson, Town Clerk of Douglas, Isle of Man.
- Alexander Sandison, MB, Principal Medical Officer, Ministry of Pensions.
- Alexander Scott, Manager of printing work, Messrs. Waterlow & Sons Limited.
- Colonel John Menzies Baillie Scott, TD, Commandant, Mounted Special Constabulary, Edinburgh.
- Charles Herman Senn, MBE, Honorary Director of the Universal Cookery and Food Association. For services to the Prison Commission.
- Arthur Tarrant, Principal District Officer, Survey Service, Mercantile Marine Department, Board of Trade.
- Millicent Weeks. For political services.
- Edith Marian Whitehead. For political and public services in Wales and Monmouth.
- Douglas Mackimmie Bennett, Director of Customs, Sudan.
- Louis Edward Bernays, His Majesty's Consul at New York.
- Francis Hugh William Stonehewer Bird, His Majesty's Agent at Jeddah.
- William John Davies, Acting Assistant Japanese Secretary at His Majesty's Embassy, Tokyo.
- Bonamy Dobrée, Professor of English literature, Egyptian University.
- William Moring Hayes, Survey Department of Egypt.
- Percy Grenville Holms, Vice-Consul at Guadalajara, Mexico.
- Llewellyn Arthur Hugh Jones, Ministry of Finance, Egypt.
- Major Paul Metcalfe Larken, District Commissioner, Sudan Political Service.
- John Hall Magowan, Local rank of Consul at Mainz.
- Hugh Charles George Oakley, on retirement from His Majesty's Embassy at Lisbon.
- Martin Willoughby Parr, Private Secretary to the Governor General of the Sudan.
- Harold Sheridan, Director of Accounts, Quarantine Board, Egypt.
- John Clive Walker, Chief Engineer of the Sudan Government Railways.
- Thomas Grieve Adamson. For public services to the Commonwealth of Australia, particularly in relation to education and training schemes for soldiers' children.
- Doris Booth. For services in the establishment of a hospital and in attending the sick in the Edie Creek Goldfield, New Guinea.
- Edwin John Brown. For public services to the Commonwealth of Australia. For 25 years Chairman of the New South Wales Rifle Association.
- Ernest Ormond Butler, Resident Magistrate, Bechuanaland Protectorate.
- John Donald Howie. For valuable services to the Commonwealth of Australia, particularly in regard to the assistance of returned soldiers.
- Major Henry William Cumine Robson, Indian Army, Secretary to the Honourable the Resident at Hyderabad.
- Major Jamshedji Nusserwanji Duggan, Indian Medical Service, Professor of Ophthalmic Medicine and Surgery, Grant Medical College, Bombay, and Superintendent of the Sir Cowasji Jehangir Ophthalmic Hospital, Bombay.
- James William Septimus Inglis, ISO, Assistant Secretary to the Government of India, Foreign and Political Department.
- Leslie William Hazlitt Duncan Best, MC, Indian Civil Service, late of the British Legation, Kabul.
- Piedade Felician Mathias, Madras Medical Service, Superintendent, Government Royapuram Hospital, and Lecturer in Surgery, Royapuram Medical School, Madras.
- Khan Bahadur Sheikh Mahbub Ali, late of the British Legation, Kabul.
- Bomonji Ratanji Bomonji, Chairman, Municipal Board, Saharanpur, United Provinces.
- Rai Bahadur Pandit Jawala Parshad, first Public Prosecutor, Lahore.
- Khan Bahadur Isa bin Abdul Latif, Residency Agent, Trucial Coast, Persian Gulf.
- Lewis Andrews, District Officer, Palestine.
- Alder James Beckley, Collector of Customs, Gold Coast.
- Louis Edmund Blaze, formerly Principal of the Kingswood (Wesleyan) College, Kandy, Ceylon.
- Henry Carr, ISO, formerly Resident of the Colony, Nigeria. For services to education.
- Frank Dixey, DSc, Director of Geological Survey, Nyasaland Protectorate.
- Vincent Gonzales Glenday, District Officer, Kenya. For services during negotiations with the Abyssinian Government 1927–1928.
- Captain Clinton Henry Greig, Commissioner of Police, Gambia.
- The Reverend Father Christopher James Kirk, MBE, of the Mill Hill Mission, Uganda Protectorate.
- Major Arthur Tremayne Miles, DSO, MC, of the Administrative Service of Kenya, British Consul for Southern Abyssinia. For services during negotiations with the Abyssinian Government 1927–1928.
- William Alfred Pover, Executive Engineer, Ministry of Communications and Works, Iraq.
- Irving Daniel Ramsay, MD, Civil Surgeon, Ministry of the Interior, Iraq.
- George Stuart, Assistant Director, Laboratories, Department of Health, Palestine.

==== Member of the Order of the British Empire (MBE) ====
Military Division

Royal Navy

- Signal Lieutenant George Henry Rogers.
- Commissioned Ordnance Officer Lionel Vinton.
- Engineer Lieutenant-Commander Richard Roycroft.
- Wardmaster Lieutenant Richard George Fuller, (Retd).
- Paymaster Lieutenant-Commander William Harfoot.
- Signal Boatswain Christopher Alfred Jezzard, Royal Naval Volunteer Reserve.

Army

- Medical Warrant Officer, 3rd Class Assistant Surgeon Alfred Backman, Indian Medical Department, attached Iraq Levies.
- Warrant Officer Class II, Battery Sergeant-Major (Acting Regimental Sergeant-Major), George William Blackman, Royal Artillery, Permanent Staff, 55th (Wessex) Field Brigade, Royal Artillery, Territorial Army.
- Commissary and Major Percy Bedwell, Indian Army Ordnance Corps, Technical Officer, Master-General of Supply Branch, Army Headquarters, India.
- Warrant Officer Class II, Company Sergeant-Major (Acting Regimental Sergeant-Major) Marshall Blake, The Black Watch (Royal Highlanders) attached Edinburgh University Contingent, Officers' Training Corps.
- Warrant Officer Class II, Company Sergeant-Major (Acting Regimental Sergeant-Major) George David Bradford, The Bedfordshire and Hertfordshire Regiment, Permanent Staff, 1st Battalion, The Hertfordshire Regiment, Territorial Army.
- Lieutenant Rixon Bucknall, Coldstream Guards, late attached Staff (Special Appointment Class GG), North China Command.
- Lieutenant Donald Robert Grant Cameron, The Royal Scots (The Royal Regiment).
- Warrant Officer Class II, Company Sergeant-Major (Acting Regimental Sergeant-Major) Harry Alfred Cartwright, 48th (South Midland) Divisional Engineers, Royal Engineers, Territorial Army.
- Lieutenant (local Captain) Wilfrid Lawson Clarke, Army Educational Corps, Commandant, King George's Royal Indian Military School, Jhelum.
- Warrant Officer Class II, Battery Sergeant-Major (Acting Regimental Sergeant-Major) Henry James Cobb, discharged on pension, late Royal Artillery and Permanent Staff, 53rd (London) Medium Brigade, Royal Artillery, Territorial Army.
- Commissary and Major Parr Cotter, Retired pay, late Indian Miscellaneous List and Superintendent, Adjutant-General's Branch, Army Headquarters, India.
- Captain George Creffield, 1st Battalion, 8th Punjab Regiment, Indian Army.
- The Reverend Mainland Theophilus Dodds, MA, Chaplain to the Forces, 3rd Class, Royal Army Chaplains' Department, Territorial Army.
- Warrant Officer Class I, Mechanist Sergeant-Major Frederic William Drake, Royal Army Service Corps, Superintending Clerk, Department of the Master-General of the Ordnance, War Office.
- Conductor William Ernest Dwyer, Indian Army Ordnance Corps.
- Warrant Officer Class II, Staff Quartermaster Sergeant Arthur Eagle, Royal Army Service Corps, Chief Clerk, Military Secretary's Branch, Headquarters, Eastern Command.
- Warrant Officer Class II, Mechanist Quartermaster Sergeant Walter William Elkin, Royal Tank Corps, attached Mechanical Warfare Experimental Establishment.
- Warrant Officer Class I, Regimental Sergeant-Major Charles Erskine, The Highland Light Infantry (City of Glasgow Regiment) attached Sudan Defence Force.
- Warrant Officer Class I, Sergeant-Major James Gilbert Eves, Royal Army Medical Corps, Superintending Clerk, Department of the Director-General, Army Medical Services, War Office.
- Warrant Officer Class I, Staff Sergeant-Major Ernest William Henry Fillmore, Royal Army Service Corps.
- Captain (Quartermaster) John Russell Gegan, TD, 152nd (Highland) Field Ambulance, Royal Army Medical Corps, Territorial Army.
- Lieutenant (Quartermaster) William Gibb, Royal Army Service Corps.
- Warrant Officer Class I, Mechanist Sergeant-Major Francis Henry Giles, Royal Army Service Corps, Superintending Clerk, Department of the Quartermaster-General to the Forces, War Office.
- Warrant Officer Class I, Conductor William Frederick Hall, Royal Army Ordnance Corps.
- Risaldar-Major Hamel Singh, Indian Army Service Corps, Indian Adjutant, 18th Divisional Troops Transport Company.
- Warrant Officer Class I, Regimental Sergeant-Major Walter Edward Hawkins, 3rd Battalion, Grenadier Guards.
- Warrant Officer Class II, Staff Quartermaster-Sergeant Herbert Heald, 55th (West Lancashire) Divisional Ordnance Company, Royal Army Ordnance Corps, Territorial Army.
- Warrant Officer Class I, Sergeant-Major Albert Victor Heggie, Royal Army Medical Corps.
- Warrant Officer Class I, Bandmaster Charles Buckland Hewitt, The Buffs (East Kent Regiment).
- Warrant Officer Class I, Superintending Clerk John Gordon Hutchison, Royal Engineers, Department of the Chief of the Imperial General Staff, War Office.
- Risaldar Karim Bux, Indian Army Service Corps, No 2 Cavalry Brigade Transport Company.
- Warrant Officer Class II, Regimental Quartermaster-Sergeant Cyril William Arthur Keen, The Bedfordshire and Hertfordshire Regiment.
- Conductor Herbert King, Royal Army Ordnance Corps, Chief Clerk, Office of the Deputy Director of Ordnance Services, China Command.
- Warrant Officer Class II, Quartermaster-Sergeant Instructor Jack Harold Lester, Royal Tank Corps, attached Tank Driving and Maintenance School, Royal Tank Corps.
- Captain (Quartermaster) Robert Martin, MC, 21st London Regiment (First Surrey Rifles), Territorial Army.
- Conductor John Mitchell, Indian Army Service Corps, late Quartermaster-Sergeant, 18th Divisional Troops Transport Company.
- Warrant Officer Class II, Company Sergeant-Major William Henry Morley, 4th Battalion, The Border Regiment, Territorial Army.
- Lieutenant Ronald Hurndall Muirhead, Royal Engineers, attached Iraq Levies.
- Warrant Officer Class I, Staff Sergeant-Major Fred Myatt, Royal Army Service Corps, Chief Clerk, Headquarters, Northern Command.
- Captain William Henry Palmer, MC, The King's Royal Rifle Corps, Superintendent Physical Training, The British Army of the Rhine.
- Assistant Commissary and Lieutenant Arthur Henry Pitts, Indian Miscellaneous List, Superintendent, General Staff Branch, Army Headquarters, India.
- Warrant Officer Class I, Staff Sergeant-Major John William Playford, Royal Army Service Corps, Chief Clerk "Q" Branch, Headquarters, Aldershot Command.
- Warrant Officer Class II, Regimental Quartermaster-Sergeant Edgar Henry Pounds, Royal Tank Corps, attached Staff College, Camberley.
- Warrant Officer, Sergeant-Major Instructor William John Redman, DCM, Royal Engineers, attached King George V's Own Bengal Sappers and Miners.
- Warrant Officer Class II, Quartermaster-Sergeant (Foreman of Signals) Cecil Stephen Roberts, Hong Kong Signal Section, Royal Corps of Signals.
- Subadar Shaikh Abdulla, 10th Field Company, Queen Victoria's Own Madras Sappers and Miners, Indian Army.
- Warrant Officer Class II, Company Sergeant-Major (Acting Regimental Sergeant-Major) John William Shepherd, 4th Battalion, The East Yorkshire Regiment, Territorial Army.
- Warrant Officer Class I, First Class Staff Sergeant-Major Francis Victor Sibbald, MM, Royal Army Service Corps, Chief Clerk, General Staff Branch, Headquarters, Eastern Command.
- Warrant Officer Class I, Regimental Sergeant-Major Ernest Henry Simmonds, DCM, 22nd Field Brigade, Royal Artillery.
- Warrant Officer Class II, Quartermaster-Sergeant David Mason Smeaton, Royal Engineers, attached School of Military Engineering.
- The Reverend George Smissen, MC, Chaplain to the Forces, 4th Class (Honorary Chaplain, 3rd Class), Royal Army Chaplain's Department, Territorial Army.
- Warrant Officer Class I, Staff Sergeant-Major Fred John Statham, Royal Army Pay Corps, attached Infantry Record and Pay Office, Shrewsbury.
- Lieutenant Gerard Reginald Steel, The Bedfordshire and Hertfordshire Regiment.
- Warrant Officer Class I, Regimental Sergeant-Major Horace Vaughan, discharged on pension, late 5th Battalion, Royal Tank Corps.
- Warrant Officer Class II, Regimental Quartermaster-Sergeant (Technical), George Douglas Warren, 12th Armoured Car Company, Royal Tank Corps.
- Commissary and Major William Weston, Indian Miscellaneous List, Officer Supervisor, Quartermaster-General's Branch, Army Headquarters, India.
- Warrant Officer Class I, Staff Sergeant-Major William Arthur Williams, Royal Army Pay Corps, attached Royal Engineers, Record and Pay Office.
- Assistant Commissary and Lieutenant Ernest Wilson, Indian Miscellaneous List, Superintendent, General Staff Branch, Army Headquarters, India.

Royal Air Force

- 1284 Sergeant-Major, 1st Class, Francis Talbot Parker.
- 777 Sergeant-Major, 1st Class, Charles William Goodchild.
- 7296 Sergeant-Major, 1st Class, Harry Wood.
- 48814 Sergeant-Major, 2nd Class, Charles Ernest Turner.

Civil Division

- Harry Kershaw Ainsworth, Acting Superintending Clerk, Ministry of Health.
- Charles John Fearnside Atkinson, Clerk to the Otley Urban District Council.
- Alfred Frank Beadle, Establishment and Finance Officer, Safety in Mines Research Board, Mines Department.
- Catherine Black, ARRC, Member of the London Hospital Nursing Staff. For services during His Majesty's recent illness.
- William Black, Chief Constable, Royal Burgh of Dumfries.
- Vivian Harry Boyse, Assistant Accountant, Colonial Office.
- Kate Elizabeth Brittain, JP. For political and public services.
- Agnes Yool Brodie, Matron, East Riding Mental Hospital.
- Major Walter Stowell Browne, Area Superintendent, Imperial War Graves Commission.
- William Leonard Buxton, lately Assistant Secretary to the Committee on Industry and Trade.
- Annie Elisabeth Cater, Headmistress, Bourneville Day Continuation School.
- Muriel Lace Clague, Staff Officer, Ministry of Pensions.
- Frederick Alchin Cloke, Clerk to the Eastry Rural District Council.
- Edward Southward Curphey, Constructor, Department of the Director of Dockyards, Admiralty.
- Rosina Davies, ARRC, Member of the London Hospital Nursing Staff. For services during His Majesty's recent illness.
- Arthur James Edmunds, Clerk, Higher Grade, Home Office.
- Thomas Fawsitt, MRCS, LRCP. For public and charitable services in Oldham.
- William James Fielden, House Governor, Chethams Hospital Blue Coat School, Manchester.
- Gilbert Arthur Finch, Officer, Board of Customs and Excise.
- Minnie Alice Fowler, County Inspector of Midwives and Superintendent Health Visitor for the Norfolk County Council.
- Arthur Ronald Fraser, lately Assistant Secretary to the Committee on Industry and Trade.
- John William Gillott, Manager, Southampton Employment Exchange, Ministry of Labour.
- Elizabeth Adam Gordon, ARRC. For nursing services during His Majesty's recent illness.
- Henry Howard Hammond, Staff Officer, Clearing Office (Enemy Debts).
- Norah Adelaide Hanson, Chairman of the Dudley Division Conservative Association. For political services.
- Annie Kate Hasted, Chairman of the Mile End Women's Conservative Association for 20 years. For political services.
- Nesta Maude Hawkes, Superintendent of the Prudhoe Mental Deficiency Colony.
- William Joseph Heavey, Superintendent of Public Cleansing, City of London.
- William Johnson, Assistant Librarian, Royal Military Academy.
- Charles Adolphus Judd, Clerk to the Conservative Chief Whip and Superintendent of the Conservative Whips' Messenger Staff since February 1898.
- Superintendent John McCommach, Superintendent and Deputy Chief Constable, Aberdeen City Police.
- Arthur Marler Marrable, Surveyor's Clerk, War Office.
- Superintendent William Joseph May, Superintendent, Birmingham City Police.
- Hugh Campbell Montgomery, Superintending Officer, Ministry of Home Affairs, Northern Ireland.
- Ada Murphy, Chief Superintendent of Women Typists, Board of Education.
- Harry Nash, Deputy Finance Officer, Ministry of Agriculture and Fisheries.
- Chief Officer Henry Neal, AMIMechE, MIFireE, Chief Officer, City of Leicester Fire Brigade.
- Lucy Ovens, Personal Assistant to the Secretary of State for Air.
- John William Parker, Headmaster, St. Hilda's Church of England School, South Shields.
- Nettie May Purdie, RRC. For nursing services during His Majesty's recent illness.
- Frank James Rutherford, Technical Officer, Office of Works.
- Margaret Elaine Smith, Vice-Chairman of the Cornwall and Isles of Scilly War Pensions Committee.
- Thomas William Dockett-Smith, City Development Agent at Cardiff. For services in connection with Empire Trade.
- Robert Henry Scanes Spicer, General Secretary, Society of Motor Manufacturers and Traders.
- John Stone, Technical Staff Officer, Stationery Office.
- Rose Marguerite Symington, Member of the Leicestershire War Pensions Committee.
- Ernest Bloomfield Thorp, Staff Officer, Board of Inland Revenue.
- Richard Trinick, Superintending Officer, Ministry of Labour, Northern Ireland.
- Minnie Clara Underwood, Deputy Superintendent, Accountant General's Department, General Post Office.
- Henry Lane Windle, Chairman of the Burnley, Nelson and District War Pensions Committee.
- Anthony John Arkell, MC, District Commissioner, Sudan Political Service.
- Thomas Cockburn Bramah, Superintendent, Cadastral Survey, Sudan.
- Richard Harold Broome, Vice-Consul at Casablanca.
- Cyril Hubert Cane, Vice-Consul at San Francisco.
- Alfred Caris, British Vice-Consul at Antwerp.
- Edward Alfred Colvin, Secretary to Commandant, Alexandria City Police.
- Harry Taylor Denson, Locomotive Works Manager, Sudan Government Railways.
- John Doherty, Superintendent of Police, Sudan.
- Henry Arthur Hobson, Vice-Consul at Ghent.
- John Jones, Superintendent of the Cairo Fire Brigade.
- Reginald Keith Jopson, Vice-Consul at Cologne.
- John Garnett Lomax, Vice-Consul at Bogotá.
- Reginald Percy Mason, Chief Clerk, Department of Ordnance Service, Egyptian Army.
- Captain Wyriott Owen, MC, Assistant District Commissioner, Sudan Political Service.
- Christopher Henry Summerhayes, Vice-Consul at Hamadan.
- Captain John William Taylor, Vice-Consul at Prague.
- Joseph Walter, Vice-Consul at Tegucigalpa.
- Charles Henry Wedlock, Egyptian Postal Administration.
- Francis Joseph Wilson, Acting Vice-Consul at Mexico City.
- Henry James Godden, Chief Clerk, Master of the Court and Registrar, Basutoland.
- Albert James Pickett, Postmaster, Maseru, Basutoland.
- Ida Standley. For educational services in Central Australia.
- Arthur Hailes Mee, Imperial Forest Service (retired), Forest Officer, Mayurbhanj State, Bihar and Orissa.
- Augustus Charles Hayes Statham, Imperial Posts and Telegraphs Service, Assistant Engineer, Wireless.
- Gladys Elizabeth Littlewood, Indian Educational Service, Inspectress of Girls' Schools, North-West Frontier Province.
- Hira Lai Phailbus, Provincial Civil Service, Extra Assistant Commissioner, Punjab.
- John Alfred de Souza, Extra Assistant Commissioner, Ajmer-Merwara.
- Khan Bahadur Captain Muhammad Zaman Khan, Honorary Magistrate, Gujrat.
- Ralph Simon Budd, Imperial Secretariat Service, Superintendent, Foreign and Political Department, Government of India.
- David Fisher, Bengal Provincial Police Service, Assistant Commissioner of Police, Calcutta, Bengal.
- William Patrick Smythe Mitchell, Indian Medical Department, Medical Officer, Bastar State, Central Provinces.
- James Herbert Theodore, Indian Medical Department, King Institute, Guindy, Madras.
- John Albert Davis, Member of Legislative Council, Chairman, Municipal Council, Ootacamund.
- Socrates Noronha, Medical Officer in Charge, Anti-Venereal Department, Bombay Municipality.
- Chhaganlal Manecklal Tijoriwala, ISO, Superintendent, Office of the Commissioner of Police, Bombay.
- Archibald Thomas Wood, Assistant Works Manager, Ammunition Factory, Kirkee.
- Ambrose Hartley Hull, late Works Manager, Harness and Saddlery Factory, Cawnpore.
- Evelyn Julius Bayley, Deputy Superintendent, Hyderabad Railway Police, Secunderabad.
- Robert Wilson, late of the British Legation, Kabul.
- Geoffrey Herbert Stranger, late of the British Legation, Kabul.
- Frederic John Scott, late of the British Legation, Kabul.
- Abdul Karim Hasanali, of Aden. For services in connection with negotiations with the Imam of Sana'a in 1928.
- John Archer, DCM, Superintendent of the Central Prison and Lunatic Asylum, Nyasaland Protectorate.
- Isabella Agnes Bannister, President of the Women's Social Welfare League, Barbados.
- Charys Elizabeth Begbie, Matron, Lady Grigg Maternity Hospital, Nairobi, Kenya.
- Joseph Briffa, Senior Clerk, Lieutenant-Governor's Office, Malta.
- Berkeley Morris Carter, Chief Storekeeper, Kenya and Uganda Railway.
- Joseph Angel Chipulina, Chief Clerk, Post Office and Telegraph Department, Gibraltar.
- Ernest William Davy, Assistant Director of Agriculture, Nyasaland Protectorate.
- Pattinihennedige Warnadipthia Kurukulasuriya Selestina Rodrigo Dias, for charitable services in Ceylon.
- John Howie Frew, Prison Superintendent, Jerusalem.
- Evelyn Storrs Karney. For child welfare work in the North Central Province of Ceylon.
- Charles Robert Philip, MB, East African Medical Service, Medical Officer, Kenya.
- Rebecca Eliza Usher. For charitable services in British Honduras.

Honorary Members

- Habib Effendi Khuri, Vice-Principal, Government Arab College, Palestine.
- Bishara Effendi Saig, Assistant Superintendent of Police, Palestine.

=== Order of the Companions of Honour (CH) ===
- Thomas Jones, MA, LLD, Deputy Secretary to the Cabinet.

=== Kaisar-i-Hind Medal ===
- Ann Gertrude, Lady Butler, Central Provinces.
- Her Highness Soubhagyavati Saraswatibai Patwardhan, Rani Sahib of Sangli, Bombay.
- Khan Bahadur Nawab Sir Sahibzada Abdul Qaiyum, KCIE, Member of the Legislative Assembly, Political Department Officer (retired), North-West Frontier Province.
- Sylvia Cassels, Lucknow.
- Irene Helen Lowe, Indian Educational Service, Deputy Directress of Public Instruction, Madras.
- Elsie Harris Schuyler, Ambala, Punjab.
- The Reverend George McGlashan Kerr, Wesleyan Missionary, Superintendent of the Leper Home and Hospital at Dichpali, His Exalted Highness the Nizam's Dominions, Hyderabad.
- George Barnes Archer, MD (Toronto), Medical Officer, Medical Mission, Dayabari, Ranaghat, Nadia, Bengal.
- Padma Bai Sanjiva Rao, Principal, Theosophical Girls College, Benares.
- Dr Subbarayappa Rama Iyer, Civil Surgeon, Burma

==== Bar to the Kaisar-i-Hind Medal ====
- The Reverend Cecil Earle Tyndale-Biscoe, MA, Principal, Church Missionary Society Schools, Kashmir.

=== Medal of the Order of the British Empire (British Empire Medal) ===
For Meritorious Service

Military Division

Royal Navy

- Robert Presley, Chief Engine Room Artificer 2nd Class, ON Portsmouth/M4917.

Army

- No 1042040 Staff-Sergeant (Artificer) Joseph Henry Coles, Royal Artillery, Headquarters 9th Field Brigade, Royal Artillery.
- No 1396029 Staff-Sergeant (Artificer) Thomas Frederick Griggs, "A" Battery, Honourable Artillery Company, Territorial Army.
- No 1855929 Sergeant Lewis Easton Kerr, Royal Engineers, Acting Regimental Sergeant-Major, Glasgow University Contingent, Officers' Training Corps.
- Dafadar Lohrasab Khan, The Central India Horse (21st King George's Own Horse), Indian Army.
- No 2310828 Lance-Sergeant John Peters, Royal Corps of Signals, attached "B" Corps Signals, Indian Signal Corps.
- Sol Talim (Sergeant-Major) Ramadan Hassan, Sudan Defence Force.

Civil Division

- William Tarry, Lately Chief Officer at Manchester Prison.
- Richard Crocker Stone, Chief Officer at Swansea Prison.
- Sam Boyton, Modeller and Map Mounter, War Office.
- George Theodore Giles, Superintendent, Command Swimming Bath, Aldershot.
- George Ernest Shiels, Constable No 2995, Royal Ulster Constabulary.
- Terence Kelly, Sergeant No 1121, Royal Ulster Constabulary.
- Ahmed Effendi Ghandour, Drawing Master and Head Craftsman, Gordon College Workshops.
- Ali Saad, Onbashi (Corporal), Blue Nile Province Police.
- Ahmed Effendi Saleh, Clerk, Stores Department, Sudan Government Railways and Steamers.

=== Companion of the Imperial Service Order (ISO) ===
Home Civil Service

- Charles Frederick Alfred Bristow, OBE, Superintending Archivist, British Embassy, Buenos Aires.
- John Honeyford Campbell, Deputy Master of the Branch Mint at Ottawa, Canada.
- Alfred Leopold De Lattre, Assistant Engineer-in-Chief, General Post Office.
- Thomas Barnes Ellis, Assistant Secretary and Chief Clerk, Public Works Loan Board.
- Hedley de Putron Gauvain, Assistant Principal Clerk, Board of Inland Revenue.
- Albert Edward Henry Goddard, Principal, Ministry of Health.
- James Grigor, Sub-Inspector, Scottish Education Department.
- James Francis Halpin, FIC, Superintending Chemist, Government Chemist's Department.
- John Edward Quayle, Chief Clerk, Rolls Office, Isle of Man.
- Ernest Wilmot Rees, MBE, Engineer, Office of Works.
- Charles Walton Roberts, Chief Examiner of Engineers, Mercantile Marine Department, Board of Trade.
- James Alfred Smith, MBE, Staff Officer, Colonial Office.
- Frank Robert Stapley, OBE, Assistant Director of Contracts, Air Ministry.
- William Stephen Tratman, Deputy Chief Superintendent, Survey and Mapping Branch, Land Registry.
- Walter Wyatt, Accountant, General Register House, Edinburgh.

Dominions

- George Lansley Beal, Auditor-General, State of Queensland.
- Alfred James Kent, Government Printer, State of New South Wales.
- Fortescue William Thomas Rowley, Secretary, Department of Labour, Dominion of New Zealand.
- Captain Almar Gordon Stigand, Senior Resident Magistrate, Bechuanaland Protectorate.
- Percival John Strutt, Under Treasurer, State of Tasmania.

Indian Civil Services

- Edward Henry Mitchell Bower, Madras Provincial Civil Service, Inspector-General of Registration, Madras.
- Rai Bahadur Jnanendra Nath Ray, Provincial Civil Service, Inspector-General of Registration, Bengal.
- John Alexander Arratoon, Assistant Secretary to the Government of Bombay, Political Department.
- Khan Bahadur Mahmud Khan, formerly His Britannic Majesty's Consul, Kandahar.
- Henry George Robinson Adie, Provincial Civil Service, Extra Assistant Commissioner, Baluchistan.
- Robert Joseph Ashby, Honorary Deputy Superintendent of Police, Bihar and Orissa.
- Khan Nur Muhammad Khan, Superintendent, Commissioner's Office, Multan.
- Emanual Jacob, Superintendent, Deputy Commissioner's Office, Gujranwala.

Colonies, Protectorates, &c.

- William Anthony Baker, lately Surveyor General, Jamaica.
- Charles Percival Bethel, Assistant Colonial Secretary, Bahama Islands.
- Cheng Cheuk-Hin, Clerk, Public Works Department, Hong Kong.
- Peter James Julyan, Clerk, Public Works Department, Hong Kong.
- Henry James Norton, Chief Inspector and Storekeeper, Revenue Branch, Treasury, Gibraltar.
- Fernand Ross, lately Deputy Inspector-General of Police, Mauritius.
- Ephraim Godman Taylor, African Assistant Treasurer, Sierra Leone.

=== Imperial Service Medal ===
- Gyepo Nzemi, late Interpreter, Naga Hills, Assam. In recognition of long and meritorious service in the Civil Service in India.

=== Distinguished Service Cross (DSC) ===
- Lieutenant (now Lieutenant-Commander) Frederick John Crosby Halahan, Royal Navy. In recognition of his gallant conduct on the occasion of the seizure by pirates and subsequent sinking of the SS Irene in Bias Bay on 20 October 1927.

=== Air Force Cross (AFC) ===
- Squadron Leader Albert Peter Vincent Daly.
- Flying Officer Leonard Butler (since deceased).

=== Air Force Medal (AFM) ===
- 6428 Flight Sergeant (Pilot) Bernard Crane.
