= List of baronetcies in the Baronetage of the United Kingdom: R =

Peerages and baronetcies of Britain and Ireland
Extant	All
Dukes	Dukedoms
Marquesses	Marquessates
Earls	Earldoms
Viscounts	Viscountcies
Barons	Baronies
Baronets	Baronetcies
En, Ire, NS, GB, UK (extinct)

This is a list of baronetcies in the Baronetage of the United Kingdom. They have been created since 1801 when they replaced the baronetages in the Baronetage of Great Britain, and Baronetage of Ireland. This list is not currently complete.

Title	Date of creation	Surname	Current status	Notes
Radcliffe of Milnsbridge House	1813	Radcliffe	extant	
Rae of Esk Grove	1804	Rae	extinct 1842	
Raeburn of Helensburgh	1923	Raeburn	extant	
Ralli of Park Street	1912	Ralli	extant	
Ramsay of Balmain	1806	Ramsay	extant	
Ramsay-Steel-Maitland of Sauchie	1917	Ramsay-Steel-Maitland	extinct 1965	
Ramsden of Birkenshaw	1938	Ramsden	extinct 1955	first Baronet created Baron Ramsden in 1945
Ranchhodlal of Shahpur	1913	Ranchhodlal	extant	
Rankin of Broughton Tower	1937	Rankin	extinct 1960	
Rankin of Bryngwyn	1898	Rankin	extant	
Raphael of Cavendish Square	1911	Raphael	extinct 1924	
Rasch of Woodhill	1903	Rasch	extant	
Rashleigh of Prideaux	1831	Rashleigh	extant	
Rawlinson of North Walsham	1891	Rawlinson	extant	
Rea of Eskdale	1935	Rea	extant	first Baronet created Baron Rea in 1937
Readhead of Westoe	1922	Readhead	extinct 1988	
Reardon-Smith of Appledore	1920	Reardon-Smith	extant	
Reckitt of Swanland Manor	1894	Reckitt	extinct 1944	
Redmayne of Rushcliffe	1964	Redmayne	extant	first Baronet created a life peer as Baron Redmayne in 1966, which title became extinct in 1983
Redwood of Avenue Road	1911	Redwood	extant	
Rees of Aylwards Chase	1919	Rees	extinct 1970	
Reid of the Chesnuts	1897	Reid	extant	Physician to the Queen
Reid of Ewell Grove	1823	Reid	extinct 1903	
Reid of Rademon	1936	Reid	extinct 1939	
Reid of Springburn and Kilmaurs	1922	Reid	extinct 2012	
Remnant of Wenhaston	1917	Remnant	extant	first Baronet created Baron Remnant in 1928
Renals of London	1895	Renals	extant	Lord Mayor of London
Renshaw of Coldharbour	1903	Renshaw	extant	
Renwick of Coombe	1927	Renwick	extant	second Baronet created Baron Renwick in 1964
Renwick of Newminster Abbey	1921	Renwick	extant	
Reynolds of Grosvenor Street	1895	Reynolds	extinct 1896	President of the Royal College of Physicians
Reynolds of Woolton	1923	Reynolds	extant	
Rhodes of Hollingworth	1919	Rhodes	extant	
Rhys-Williams of Miskin	1918	Rhys-Williams	extant	
Rich of Sunning	1863	Rich	extinct 1869	
Richardson of Eccleshall	1963	Richardson	extinct 2004	first Baronet created a life peer as Baron Richardson in 1979
Richardson of Weybridge	1929	Richardson	extinct 1981	
Richardson of Yellow Woods	1924	Richardson	extant	
Richmond of Hollington	1929	Richmond	dormant	second Baronet died 2000
Ricketts of Beaumont Lyes	1828	Ricketts	extant	
Riddell of Walton Heath	1918	Riddell	extinct 1934	first Baronet created Baron Riddell in 1920
Rigby of Long Durford	1929	Rigby	extant	
Ripley of Acacia	1897	Ripley	extinct 1954	
Ripley of Rawdon	1880	Ripley	extant	
Ritchie of Highlands and of Queensborough-terrace	1903	Ritchie	extinct 1912	Lord Mayor of London
Ritchie of Lees House	1918	Ritchie	extinct 1991	
Rivett-Carnac of Derby	1836	Rivett-Carnac	extant	
Roberts of Bryngwenallt	1908	Roberts	extant	first Baronet created Baron Clwyd in 1919. Unproven.
Roberts of Brightfieldstown	1809	Roberts	extant	
Roberts of Eccleshall and Queen's Tower	1919	Roberts	extant	
Roberts of Martholme	1931	Roberts	extinct 1950	
Roberts of Milner Field	1909	Roberts	extant	
Roberts of the Army	1881	Roberts	extinct 1914	first Baronet created Baron Roberts of Kandahar in 1892, which title became extinct in 1914, and Earl Roberts in 1901, which title became extinct in 1955
Robertson of Beaconsfield	1919	Robertson	extant	second Baronet created Baron Robertson of Oakridge in 1961
Robinson of Batts House	1823	Robinson	extinct 1944	
Robinson of Hawthornden and Dudley House	1908	Robinson	extant	
Robinson, later Lynch-Robinson of Lisnacarrig	1920	Robinson, Lynch-Robinson	extant	
Robinson of Rokeby Hall	1819	Robinson	extinct 1910	
Robinson of Rosmead	1891	Robinson	extinct 1933	first Baronet created Baron Rosmead in 1896
Robinson of Toronto	1854	Robinson	dormant	seventh Baronet died 1988
Roche of Carass	1838	Roche	extant	
Rodgers of Groombridge	1964	Rodgers	extant	
Roe of Brundish	1836	Roe	extinct 1866	
Roll of Wanstead	1921	Roll	extinct 1998	Lord Mayor of London
Rolleston of Upper Brook Street	1924	Rolleston	extinct 1944	President of the Royal College of Physicians
Ropner of Preston Hall and Skutterskelfe Hall	1904	Ropner	extant	
Ropner of Thorp Perrow	1952	Ropner	extant	
Rose of Hardwick House	1909	Rose	extant	fourth Baronet succeeded to the Rose Baronetcy of Montreal (created 1872) in 1979
Rose of Leith	1935	Rose	extinct 1976	
Rose of Montreal and Queen's Gate	1872	Rose	extant	fifth Baronet had already succeeded to the Rose Baronetcy of Hardwick House (created in the Baronetage of the United Kingdom in 1909) in 1966 when he succeeded in 1979
Rose of Rayners	1874	Rose	dormant	third Baronet died 1982
Ross of Dunmoyle	1919	Ross	extinct 1958	
Ross of Whetstone	1960	Ross	extant	
Rothband of Higher Broughton	1923	Rothband	extinct 1940	
Rothschild of Tring	1847	Rothschild	extant	second Baronet created Baron Rothschild in 1885
Rowland of Taunton	1950	Rowland	extinct 1970	Lord Mayor of London
Rowley of Hill House	1836	Rowley	extant	seventh Baronet succeeded to the Rowley Baronetcy of Tendring (created 1786) in 1997
Rowley of the Navy	1813	Rowley	extinct 1842	
Royce of Seaton	1930	Royce	extinct 1933	
Royden of Frankby	1905	Royden	extant	second Baronet created Baron Royden in 1944, which title became extinct in 1950
Ruggles-Brise of Spains Hall	1935	Ruggles-Brise	extant	
Runciman of Jesmond	1906	Runciman	extant	first Baronet created Baron Runciman in 1933; second Baron had already been created Viscount Runciman of Doxford when he succeeded to the Baronetcy and Barony in 1937
Cockerell, later Rushout of Sezincote	1809	Cockerell, Rushout	extinct 1931	
Russel of Charlton Park	1832	Russell	extinct 1915	
Russell of Littleworth Corner	1916	Russell	extant	
Russell of Olney	1917	Russell	extinct 1920	
Russell of Swallowfield	1812	Russell	dormant	sixth Baronet died 1964
Rutherford of Beardwood	1916	Rutherford	extinct 1932	
Rutherford of Liverpool	1923	Rutherford	extinct 1942	
Ryan of Hintlesham	1919	Ryan	extant	
Rylands of Thelwall	1939	Rylands	extinct 1948	
