= Everard Radcliffe =

English cricketer and Radcliffe baronet

Sir Everard Joseph Reginald Henry Radcliffe, 5th Baronet (27 January 1884 – 23 November 1969), the 5th of the Radcliffe baronets, was an English amateur first-class cricketer.

Radcliffe was born at Hensleigh House, Tiverton, Devon, England, and was educated at Downside School and Oxford University.

Radcliffe played in 64 first-class matches for Yorkshire County Cricket Club between 1909 and 1911. He succeeded Lord Hawke as captain for one season in 1910. In first-class cricket Radcliffe scored 826 runs at 10.86 and took two wickets at an average of 67.00 and 21 catches. He also played for the Yorkshire Gentlemen, Oxford University Authentics and appeared in a single match in 1903 for Shropshire.

Radcliffe worked was a stockbroker in Newcastle-upon-Tyne. The Radcliffe family lived at Rudding Park House in Harrogate, Yorkshire, from 1824 until the estate was sold in 1972.

Radcliffe was a Knight of Grace and Devotion of the Sovereign Military Order of Malta.

Radcliffe died in November 1969 at St Trinian's Hall, Richmond, Yorkshire, aged 85.

Baronetage of the United Kingdom
Preceded by Joseph Radcliffe	Baronet (of Milnsbridge House); 1949–1969	Succeeded by Everard Radcliffe
