= General Barrow =

General Barrow may refer to:

- Edmund Barrow (1852–1934), British Army general
- George Barrow (Indian Army officer) (1864–1959), British Indian Army general
- Harold Percy Waller Barrow (1876–1957), British Army major general
- Robert H. Barrow (1922–2008), U.S. Marine Corps four-star general

== See also ==
- David Prescott Barrows (1873–1954), U.S. National Guard major general
