= St Joseph and St James' Church, Follifoot =

Church in Follifoot, North Yorkshire, England

Coordinates: 53°58′09″N 1°28′44″W

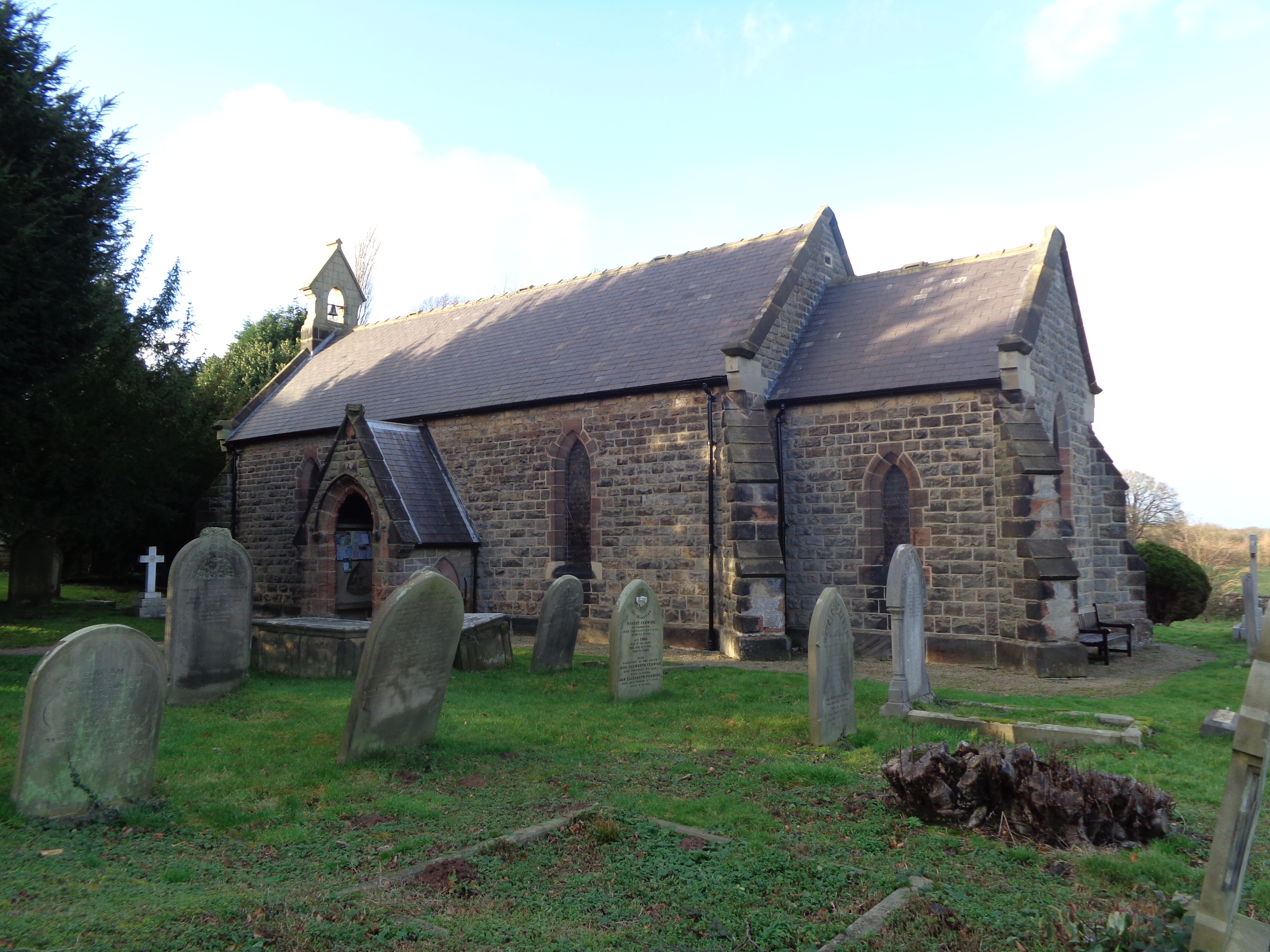
The church, in 2013

St Joseph and St James' Church is an Anglican church in Follifoot, a village in North Yorkshire, in England.

The church was commissioned by Joseph Radcliffe and the Reverend James Tripp, originally as a chapel of ease to All Saints' Church, Spofforth. It was opened on 22 October 1848, by the Bishop of Ripon. Its construction cost £750 and it could accommodate up to 150 worshippers. The pulpit dates from 1955 and was designed by Robert Thompson, while the pews, altar rail, table and Bishop's chair were replaced between 1964 and 1966. The tower was restored and reduced in height in 1975, and the whole church was restored in 1991. The building was grade II listed in 1985.

The church is built of gritstone with sandstone dressings and a slate roof. It consists of a nave, a south porch, and a chancel with a small north vestry. On the west gable is a gabled bellcote with one round-headed arch. The porch is gabled and contains an entrance with a pointed arch and a hood mould, and the windows are lancets. The windows in the chancel have stained glass inserted between 1879 and 1881 and are dedicated to the memory of Radcliffe.

== See also ==
- Listed buildings in Follifoot
