= Sir Joseph Radcliffe, 1st Baronet =

English landowner and magistrate

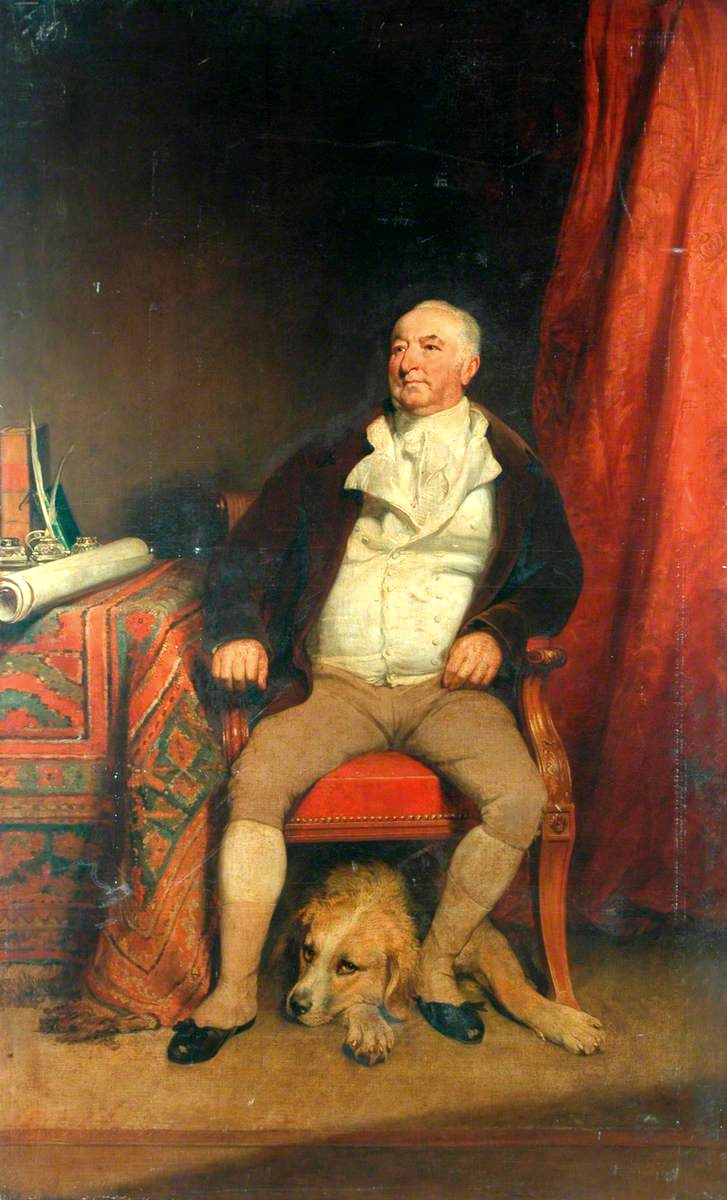
Sir Joseph Radcliffe, portrait c.1815

Sir Joseph Radcliffe, 1st Baronet (1744–1819), name at birth Joseph Pickford, was an English landowner, and a magistrate noted for his repression of Luddites in northern England. He changed his surname, to his mother's maiden name, in 1795.

== Early life and change of name ==
Joseph Pickford was born at Alt Hill (Althill), then a hamlet near Ashton under Lyne, and was baptised there on 8 May 1744. He was the son of Joseph Pickford of Ashton and Mary Radcliffe of Milnsbridge. His father died in 1755.

In the 1770s, then based at Royton, Pickford corresponded with Charles Prescot, at that time a Fellow of St Catharine's College, Cambridge. The letters show an interest in carding machinery. In 1783 Prescot became rector of Stockport, Cheshire, holding the position for the rest of his life, and later was a magistrate in Cheshire and Lancashire.

In 1795, his mother Mary's brother William died, leaving Joseph his sole heir, providing he was willing to change his name from Pickford to Radcliffe. Joseph Radcliffe became the owner of extensive estates and properties in Milnsbridge and the Colne Valley. He also owned property west of the Pennines, for example at Barrowshaw, now in Manchester.

== Magistracy and the Luddite disturbances ==
Pickford became a magistrate for the West Riding of Yorkshire, Lancashire, Derbyshire and Cheshire; he was a Justice of the Peace for Salford Hundred, from his residence at Royton, and attended Manchester meetings from 1792. Described as "fairly conscientious", he first as a magistrate encountered sedition, in cases brought on "seditious words" uttered, in 1798. He submitted two to the Home Office, where they were eventually passed to John King; who asked for the second case, a certain John Taylor, further details before approving prosecution. The first case, against David Norcross with soldiers as witnesses, was regarded as more clear-cut. Radcliffe went on to gain a reputation for heavy-handed justice, in repression of the so-called "Black Lamp" in the years around 1800.

In February 1812, Radcliffe began a prolonged campaign to bring the Luddite disturbances to the attention of the government. In about March of that year, he began to receive pseudonymous threatening letters, signed with some form of the "Ned Ludd" name.

After an attack on William Cartwright's Mill in Rawfolds and the murder of wool textile manufacturer William Horsfall by Luddites in April 1812, he pursued an intense investigation. E. P. Thompson, however, commented that Radcliffe, working with William Fitzwilliam, 4th Earl Fitzwilliam, Lord Lieutenant of the West Riding of Yorkshire, was genuinely concerned to establish the facts, contrasting the approach with that taken by Lord Sidmouth and his team. Radcliffe had an ally at Liversedge, the Rev. Hammond Roberson, an evangelical follower of Henry Venn; Roberson appears in Shirley by Charlotte Brontë, as Matthew Helstone.

Radcliffe set up an extensive system of spies and informers to infiltrate workers' meetings, and offered rewards for information that might help convict suspects. Many of those were interrogated by Radcliffe at Milnsbridge House, in what came to be known as the "sweat room". As a result of his campaign, he had three men, George Mellor, Thomas Smith and William Thorpe, sent to York Castle for trial in January 1813, taking a place on the jury himself and condemning them as guilty. The three were hanged a two days later, and Radcliffe was a spectator at their execution at the New Drop at York.

=== Baronetcy ===
In September 1813, Radcliffe was made a Baronet for his public service in bringing the Luddites to justice. On 18 September 1813, Lord Sidmouth wrote to Radcliffe to congratulate him:

I have the honour of communicating to you the gracious intention of H.R.H. the Prince Regent, 'forthwith to confer upon you the dignity of a Baronet of the United Kingdom. It is with great satisfaction that I convey to you such a testimony of the opinion entertained by H.R. Highness of that loyal, zealous, and intrepid conduct which you have invariably displayed at a period when the West Riding of the County of York presented a disgraceful scene of outrage and plunder; and by which, in the discharge of your duty as a magistrate; you contributed most materially to re-establish in that quarter, tranquility and obedience to the laws, and to restore security to the lives and property of His Majesty's subjects.

== Later life ==
Radcliffe continued to live the life of a wealthy country gentleman, often spending time in his house at Clifton in Bristol. He died there in 1819, but was buried in the family tomb in Royton Chapel. Radcliffe's birth surname was commemorated long after in Pickford Street and Pickford Buildings in Royton, and the prize for Royton Athletic Sports day became known as 'The Pickford Plate.'

== Family ==
Joseph Pickford married firstly Katherine Percival on 3 March 1763; she was the daughter of Thomas Percival and his wife Martha Gregge. Katherine died in 1765 and their only child, William Percival Pickford, died in Edinburgh in 1815 without issue; William had inherited Royton Hall in Royton, Lancashire, from his grandfather Thomas Percival, who died in 1762. On William's death, the Royton Hall estate passed to his father.

Pickford then remarried in 1765 to Elizabeth Sunderland, who died in 1799. He married his third wife Elizabeth Creswick in 1807 and she long outlived him until 1855. He had eight children with Elizabeth Sunderland, two sons and six daughters. The sons were:

- Joseph Pickford Radcliffe (c.1767–1804), married Mary, daughter of Sir Archibald Grant, 3rd Baronet.
- Charles Pickford RN, born 1769. He went to sea at age 12 on HMS Gibraltar commanded by Sir Richard Bickerton, 1st Baronet. He reached the rank of commander, on the bomb sloop HMS Discovery, and HMS Glommen (de:Glommen (Schiff), a former Danish vessel briefly known as HMS Britomart). He was in command of the Glommen when it was wrecked in Carlisle Bay in 1809, without loss of life. He married in 1800 Mary Emilia (or Emily) Mackinnon, daughter of Charles Mackinnon, self-styled chief of Clan Mackinnon; she had previously married the banker Alexander Mackinnon of Naples in 1792; and then divorced him. He died in 1841.

Sir Joseph's elder son, the Rev. Joseph Pickford, died before him in 1804, so the title passed to his grandson, Sir Joseph Radcliffe, 2nd Baronet. After his grandfather's death, the 2nd baronet sold Milnsbridge House and moved the family to Rudding Park House.

Of the daughters:

- Mary, fourth child and second daughter, was born in 1771. She married, firstly, Joseph Starkey of Redvales, who died without issue in 1803. She married, secondly in 1805, John Macbride.
- Harriet (1773–1849), fourth daughter, married William Alexander MD (died 1808) of Halifax in 1803. He belonged to the noted Alexander medical family of Halifax, being the eldest son of Dr John Alexander (died 1801).

Hannah, the fifth daughter, married William Willcock. Elizabeth, second child, died 1810, and Catherine, fifth child, died 1800, did not marry.

The sixth daughter and youngest child was Frances. She was acquainted with Anne Lister of Shibden Hall. It is claimed that the "Pic" and "Frank" in the encrypted diaries of Anne Lister is Frances Pickford. In recent years, many of the diary entries have been transcribed by author Helena Whitbread. According to the diaries, Frances confessed to liaisons with women and flirted with Lister, who was some 12 years her junior. The two women formed a brief friendship, attending lectures together, shopping, and occasionally walking out. Lister described Frances as "learned" and "clever" which, she claimed, was more than could be said for many of her acquaintances.
