= Islay McOwan =

Australian sportsman (1871–1948)

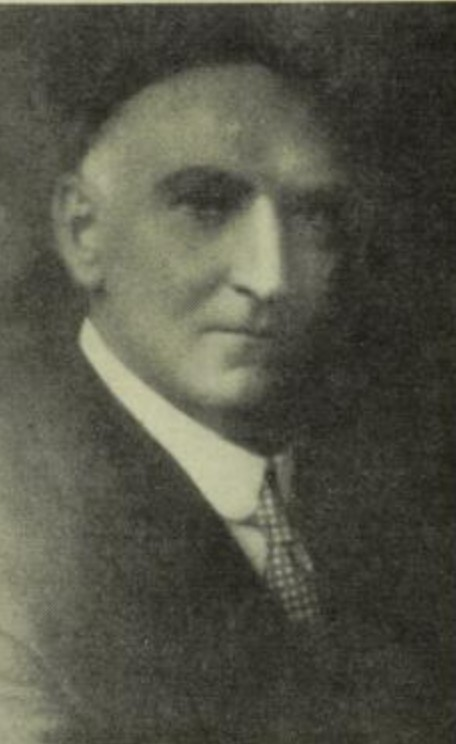

Personal information
- Full name: Islay McOwan
- Born: 4 April 1871; Melbourne
- Died: 4 April 1948 (aged 77); Sydney
- Batting: Right-handed
- Role: Batsman

Domestic team information
- Years: Team
- 1894–95: Fiji

Career statistics
Competition	FC
Matches	6
Runs scored	49
Batting average	4.45
100s/50s	-/-
Top score	22
Balls bowled	na
Wickets	4
Bowling average	15.25
5 wickets in innings	0
10 wickets in match	0
Best bowling	2/14
Catches/stumpings	4/2
- Source: Cricinfo, 1 April 2022

Islay McOwan CMG (4 April 1871 – 4 April 1948) was a first-class cricketer, Australian rules footballer and colonial administrator.

Born in Melbourne, McOwan attended Melbourne Church of England Grammar School and played junior football for South St Kilda, before transferring to Carlton Football Club, which was then playing in the Victorian Football Association (VFA), the leading Australian rules football competition in Victoria prior to the formation of the Victorian Football League (VFL).

McOwan made his senior VFA debut in 1891 and was declared one of the best Carlton players of the year leading Carlton to the Grand Final, losing to Essendon. McOwan carried his form into 1892, being one of Carlton's better players. Accepting a position in the Office of the Colonial Secretary in Fiji, McOwan played his last game of football on 27 August 1892 against Fitzroy at Brunswick Street Oval, finishing with around 29 VFA matches for Carlton.

In Fiji, McOwan found time to play cricket, leading to his selection for Fiji for the tour of New Zealand in 1894/95. McOwan played in the inaugural Fijian first-class match, starting 25 January 1895 against Auckland, scoring four and 22 and taking 1/24, with Jocelyn Kallender his first first-class wicket. McOwan also kept wicket during the tour, taking two stumpings against Hawke's Bay. In a non-first-class match against Nelson, McOwan topscored for Fiji with 45 not out to win by three wickets.

In Fiji McOwan rose through colonial administration ranks, holding positions such as acting Stipendiary Magistrate from 1896, Inspector-General of Police and Prisons in Fiji from 1909 to 1911, acting British agent and consul in Tonga to 1913. acting Fijian Native Commissioner, and was in command of the Fiji Defence Forces at the commencement of World War I.

In 1917 Mc Owan was appointed British agent and consul in Tonga, succeeding William Telfer Campbell. McOwan remained in Tonga until 1926 when he was appointed Secretary for Native Affairs in Fiji, a position he held until his retirement in 1936. In Fiji McOwan also served at various times as Acting Colonial Secretary, Deputy Governor, Acting Governor and was a member of the Executive Council and the Legislative Council of Fiji.

Following his retirement, McOwan and his wife lived in Auckland before moving to Sydney in 1941. McOwan started playing golf while stationed in Fiji, winning the national championships twice and became a leading golfer in New Zealand, winning local open titles in his sixties.

McOwan died on his 77th birthday on 4 April 1948 in Sydney after suffering from illness for two years. He was survived by his wife, Christine Griffiths, the daughter of George Griffiths, founder of the first newspaper in Fiji, Fiji Times, as well as founder of the Fijian postal service. and Eileen, a Fiji-based daughter. Following his death, a former colleague in Fiji said that "Fiji probably owes more to him than to any other officer who has served there in recent years.

== Sources ==
- McCarron, T. (2010) New Zealand Cricketers, The Association of Cricket Statisticians and Historians: Cardiff. ISBN 9781905138982
