= Post Fiji =

Fijian national post office

Post Fiji is the national post office of Fiji. The group was founded in 1871 by the Cakobau Postal Act.

The full range of postal, courier and related services are provided by Post Fiji Pte Limited, a state-owned enterprise and runs 58 post offices plus 100 postal agencies. the modern organisation was set up under the Public Enterprise Act controlled by the 2015 Companies Act.

In March 2024, Isaac Mow became the new Chief Executive Officer, having previously works at different levels within the post office.

== See also ==
- Postage stamps and postal history of Fiji
