= Robin Udal =

English cricketer

Nicholas Robin Udal CBE (16 October 1883 – 27 February 1964) was an English first-class cricketer active 1904–14 who played for Marylebone Cricket Club (MCC) and Oxford University. He was born in Richmond-upon-Thames and died in Pembury. He played in 14 first-class matches as a right-handed batsman, scoring 387 runs with a highest score of 49*; and as a right-arm fast bowler, taking 65 wickets with a best performance of seven for 133.

Udal was educated at Winchester College and New College, Oxford. After graduating he joined the Sudan Civil Service and rose to be assistant director of education in the Sudan government 1918–30 and Warden of Gordon Memorial College, Khartoum, 1927–30. He was awarded the 3rd class of the Order of the Nile. He returned to England and was bursar of Clifton College 1930–36 and secretary of the Athenæum 1936–51. He was appointed CBE in the 1929 Birthday Honours.
