= Puleston baronets =

Extinct baronetcy in the Baronetage of the United Kingdom

- Escutcheon of the Puleston Baronets of Emral
- Creation date: 1813
- Status: extinct
- Extinction date: 1896
- Motto: Clariores e tenebris, Brighter after the darkness

The Puleston Baronetcy, of Emral in the County of Flint, was a title in the Baronetage of the United Kingdom. It was created on 2 November 1813 for Richard Parry Price, heir to the Puleston estates, who changed his surname accordingly. The title became extinct on the death of the fourth Baronet in 1896.

== Puleston baronets, of Emral (1813) ==
- Sir Richard Price Puleston, 1st Baronet (1765–1840)
- Sir Richard Puleston, 2nd Baronet (1789–1860)
- Sir Richard Price Puleston, 3rd Baronet (1813–1893)
- Sir Theophilus Gresley Henry Puleston, 4th Baronet (1821–1896), died without heir.

Baronetage of the United Kingdom
Preceded by Oakes baronets	Puleston baronets of Emral; 2 November 1813	Succeeded by Radcliffe baronets
