= Follifoot =

Village and civil parish in North Yorkshire, England

Coordinates: 53°58′02″N 1°28′49″W

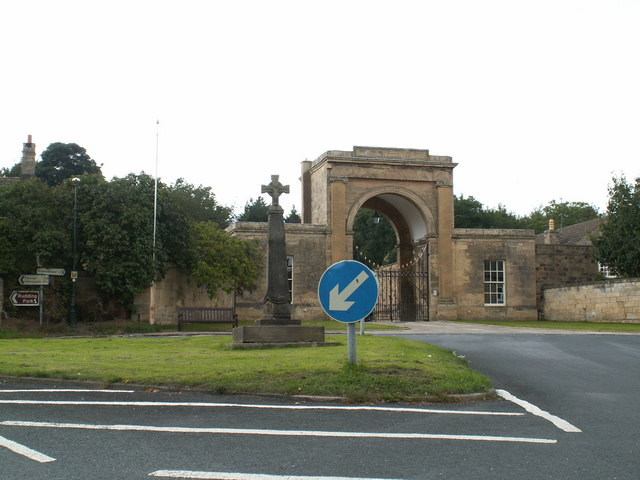
- Saxon Cross and Rudding park gates

- Location within North Yorkshire
- Population: 577 (2011 Census)
- OS grid reference: SE342524
- Civil parish: Follifoot
- Unitary authority: North Yorkshire
- Ceremonial county: North Yorkshire
- Region: Yorkshire and the Humber
- Country: England
- Sovereign state: United Kingdom
- Post town: HARROGATE
- Postcode district: HG3
- Police: North Yorkshire
- Fire: North Yorkshire
- Ambulance: Yorkshire
- UK Parliament: Harrogate and Knaresborough

Follifoot is a village and civil parish in the county of North Yorkshire, England. It is situated on the A658 road and 4 miles (6.4 km) south-east from the town centre of Harrogate.

== History ==
The village name is derived from Old Norse translating as "place of the horse fight" and the village has a long association with horse sports. Follifoot is not listed in the Domesday Book of 1086, and the earliest known record is as Pholifet in the 12th century. Anglo-Saxon remains have been discovered in and near to the village, and an Anglian cross is displayed at the crossroads at the top of the village.

In the 19th century the village was a thriving community supported by such commerce as the flax industry, tanning, tailors, joiners, a wheelwright, cordwainer and blacksmiths.

Until 1974 it was part of the West Riding of Yorkshire. From 1974 to 2023 it was part of the Borough of Harrogate; it is now administered by the unitary North Yorkshire Council.

== Amenities ==
The village has two pubs the Radcliffe Arms and the Harewood Arms, both Sam Smiths. The village has one shop and post office and opposite a small school. There is one Anglican church, St. Joseph and St. James situated on Plompton Road. The village is served by one bus service, the X70 operated by Connexionsbuses and links the village with Harrogate, Spofforth, Wetherby and York.

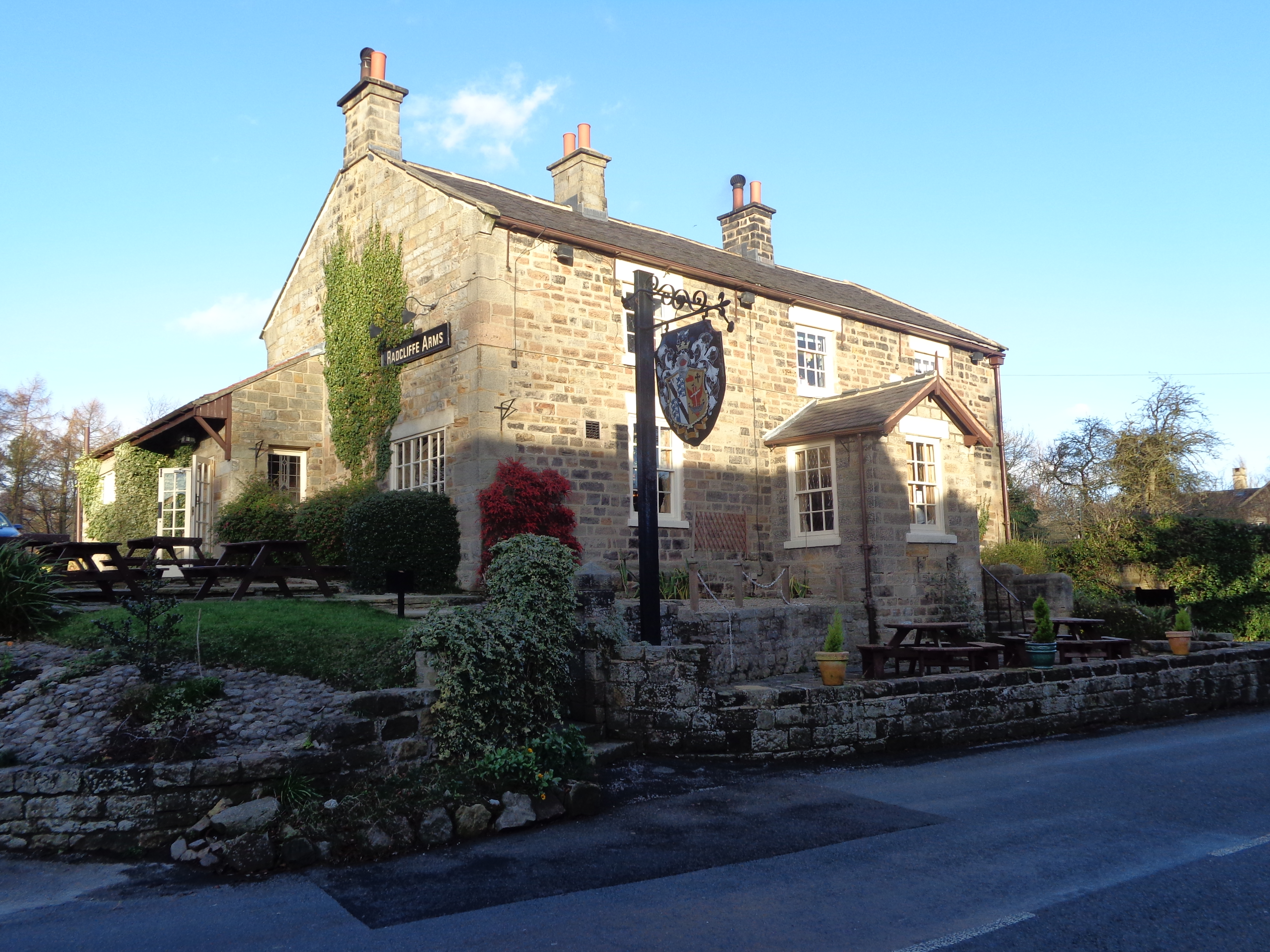
Radcliffe Arms

== Rudding Park Estate ==
The south gatehouse of the Rudding Park Estate stands at the top of the village. The estate was bought by Lord Loughborough in 1788, and he engaged the landscape designer Humphry Repton to improve the grounds and surrounding landscape.

The estate was purchased by the Hon William Gordon in 1805 and he was responsible for the construction of the present house. At the time the estate was purchased by Sir Joseph Radcliffe, 2nd Baronet 19 years later, the house was still unfinished. In 1972 the house and 2000-acre estate was acquired by the Mackaness family.

Today the estate compromises a hotel, caravan and camp site, a restaurant and golf course. The main part of the estate is now separated from the village by the A658 Harrogate bypass.

== St Joseph and St James Church ==
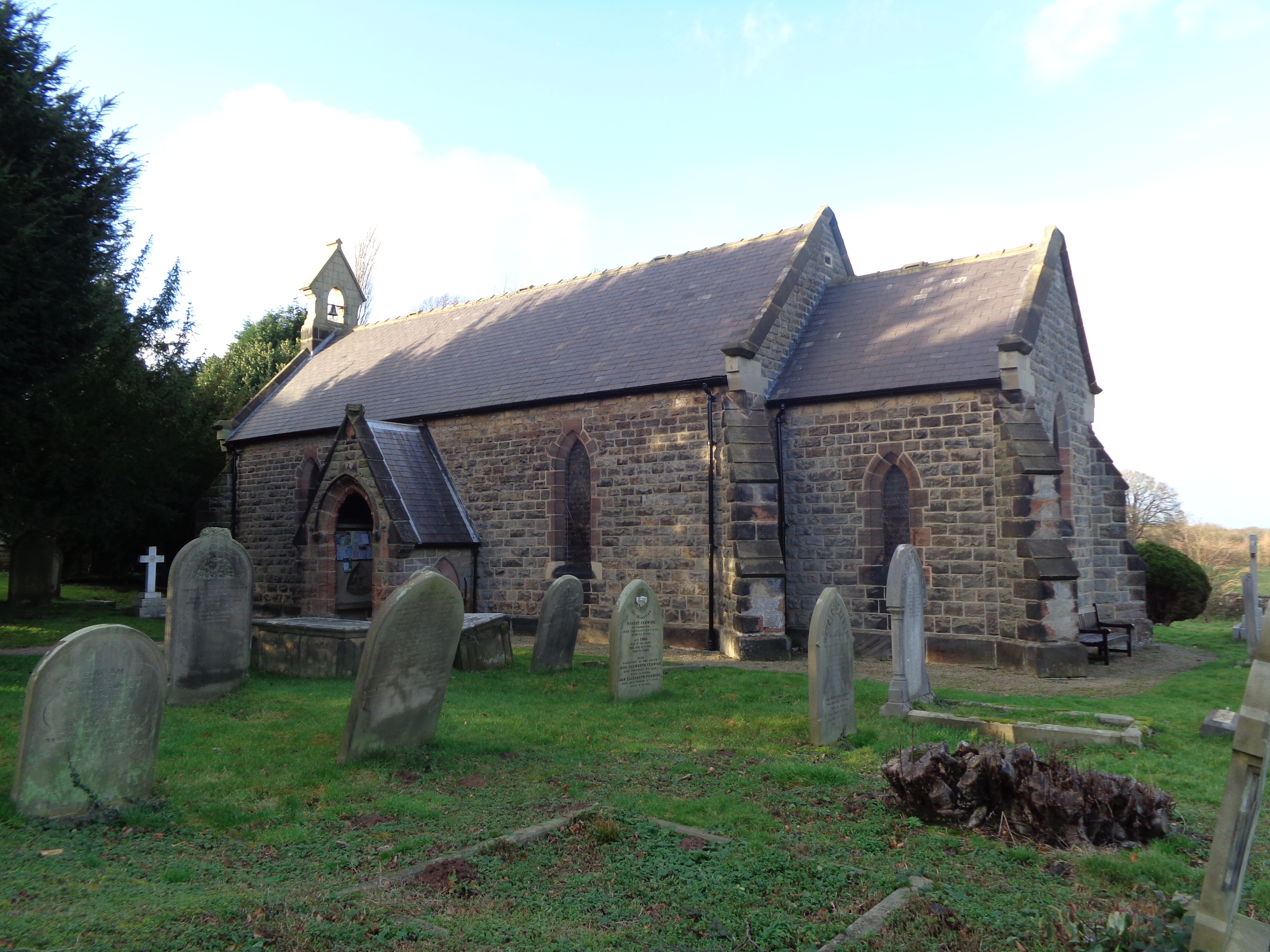
St Joseph and St James Church

St Joseph and St James Church was opened on 22 October 1848 after Sir Joseph Radcliffe, 2nd Baronet (1799–1872), owner of Rudding Park, gave part of Longlands Field for the church site. The church, now grade II listed, contains three stained glass windows dedicated to his memory.

== See also ==
- Listed buildings in Follifoot
