= Listed buildings in Follifoot =

Follifoot is a civil parish in the county of North Yorkshire, England. It contains 20 listed buildings that are recorded in the National Heritage List for England. Of these, one is listed at Grade I, the highest of the three grades, and the others are at Grade II, the lowest grade. The parish contains the village of Follifoot and the surrounding area. The most important building in the parish is Rudding Park House, which is listed together with associated structures in the garden and grounds. Most of the other listed buildings are houses and associated structures, and the rest include a wayside cross, an animal pound, a set of stocks, a milepost, a church, a chapel and a telephone kiosk.

== Key ==
Grade	Criteria
I	Buildings of exceptional interest, sometimes considered to be internationally important
II	Buildings of national importance and special interest

== Buildings ==
Name and location	Photograph	Date	Notes	Grade
Saxon Cross; 53.96836°N 1.48089°W		9th century	The village cross was restored in the 19th century. It consists of a square tapering column surmounted by a cross with a small sculpture of the Crucifixion. It stands on a moulded circular base on three square steps, and it has a similar moulded cap.	II
Animal pound 53.96930°N 1.47785°W		16th century (possible)	The animal pound is in gritstone. It is circular with a diameter of about 7 metres (23 ft), and the walls are between 1 metre (3 ft 3 in) and 2 metres (6 ft 7 in) high. On the north side is an opening with a wooden gate.	II
Stocks; 53.96817°N 1.48066°W	—	17th century (possible)	The stocks were restored in 1957, since when they have been enclosed in a shelter with iron railings. The stocks are in wood, and consist of two posts supporting panels with two pairs of holes. There are two iron staples with loops for padlocks.	II
The Dower House; 53.97713°N 1.48979°W	—	Late 17th century	The house, later divided into three houses, is in gritstone, and has a stone slate roof with stone coping, and two storeys. The central section has three bays, and contains a doorway with a chamfered surround, and mullioned windows with hood moulds. It is flanked by lower three-bay sections.	II
Park Croft; 53.96863°N 1.48135°W	—	Early 18th century	Two cottages combined into a house, it is in gritstone, with sandstone quoins, and a stone slate roof with stone gable coping and shaped kneelers. There are two storeys and four bays, and a later single-storey extension at the rear. The second bay contains double doors in an architrave, in the outer bays are bow windows, and the other windows are sashes in architraves. In the rear extension is a re-set doorway with a moulded surround and a dated lintel.	II
Milepost; 53.97219°N 1.49975°W		Mid 18th century	The milepost on the northwest side of Rudding Lane is in stone with a square plan. On each face is a carved pointing hand and the distance to various locations. On the southeast front is an iron hinge spindle.	II
Bee boles and wall, Park Side; 53.96915°N 1.48076°W	—	18th century (probable)	The garden wall and bee boles are in sandstone and magnesian limestone. The wall is about 1.5 metres (4 ft 11 in) high and 8 metres (26 ft) long. It contains eight bee boles, consisting of square recesses about 60 centimetres (24 in) wide and 30 centimetres (12 in) deep.	II
Hunters Lodge; 53.96874°N 1.48001°W		Late 18th century	The house is in gritstone, with quoins, and a Westmorland slate roof with shaped kneelers and stone gable coping. There are two storeys and three bays, and single-storey wings under catslide roofs. The central doorway has been converted into a window with an incised lintel, above which is a round window with a plain surround. The other windows are sashes with channelled lintels, and in the wings they are horizontally-sliding.	II
Park Side; 53.96876°N 1.48054°W	—	Late 18th century	The house is in gritstone, with quoins, and a stone slate roof with sawn-off kneelers and gable coping. There are two storeys and three bays. In the centre is a doorway in Classical style flanked by bow windows. The upper floor contains sash windows in architraves, with tripartite incised lintels.	II
The Priory; 53.96866°N 1.47940°W	—	Late 18th century	The house is in gritstone, with quoins, a floor band, and a stone slate roof with shaped kneelers and stone gable coping. There are two storeys and three bays. In the centre is a doorway with a fanlight and a hood, and the windows on the front are sashes with channelled lintels and stone sills. At the rear is a doorway flanked by canted bay windows.	II
Hilltop House; 53.96824°N 1.48134°W	—	1796	The house is in sandstone with an extension in grey gritstone, and a Westmorland slate roof with shaped kneelers and stone coping. There are two storeys, two bays, and a single-storey single-bay extension to the right. The main block has quoins, and a central doorway in Classical style. The windows are sashes with architraves, and channelled lintels, one dated.	II
Rudding Park House; 53.97355°N 1.49200°W		1805–24	A country house, later a hotel, in gritstone with a Westmorland slate roof. There are two storeys, a main block with fronts of 13 and seven bays., and a four-bay rear wing. The east front has floor and sill bands, a moulded eaves cornice, a blocking course and a hipped roof. In the centre is a portico on three steps with four Tuscan columns and a plain entablature. This is flanked by two-storey three-bay bow windows, and all the windows are sashes. There are also bow windows on each return and at the rear.	I
Stables and wall, Rudding Park House; 53.97375°N 1.49355°W	—	1805–24	The stables, later converted for other uses, are in gritstone, with Westmorland slate roofs, and a single storey. There are two ranges at right angles. The main range has three bays, an eaves cornice, a blocking course and a hipped roof, and it contains sash windows. On the roof is a clock, and a bellcote with a lead roof. The other range is lower, and contains a round-arched opening and a triangular pediment. A wall connects the former stables, the house and the garden.	II
Rudding Gates and walls 53.96867°N 1.48094°W		Early 19th century	The buildings are in stone and consist of a central round-arched gateway flanked by flat-roofed lodges and a wall. The arch has a moulded archivolt, Ionic columns, a plain entablature, a dentilled cornice and a moulded blocking course. The lodges have one storey and one bay, and each lodge contains a sash window, a moulded cornice and a blocking course. The wall is curved, with plain coping, and square piers with shallow pyramidal caps, and the gates are in wrought iron.	II
Gates, gate piers and flanking walls, Rudding Park; 53.97756°N 1.49043°W	—	Early 19th century (probable)	At the entrance to the grounds are wrought iron gates, flanked by stone piers about 4 metres (13 ft) high. Each pier has a projecting plinth, and is surmounted by a massive bull's head in a coronet. The flanking walls are about 2 metres (6 ft 7 in) high with heavy capping, and there are outer piers with caps and shallow pyramid tops.	II
Gates, overthrow, gate piers and wall, Rudding Park; 53.97280°N 1.49611°W	—	Early 19th century (probable)	Between the former rose garden and kitchen garden are wrought iron gates and a decorated semicircular overthrow. The flanking square brick piers are about 4 metres (13 ft) high, and each pier has stepped coping and a ball finial. The garden wall is in brick with stone coping, and is about 60 metres (200 ft) long.	II
St Joseph and St James' Church; 53.96914°N 1.47890°W		1848	The church is in gritstone with sandstone dressings and a slate roof. It consists of a nave, a south porch, and a chancel with a small north vestry. On the west gable is a gabled bellcote with one round-headed arch. The porch is gabled and contains an entrance with a pointed arch and a hood mould, and the windows are lancets.	II
Vase west of Rudding Park House; 53.97271°N 1.49574°W	—	Mid 19th century (or earlier)	The vase in the garden, brought here from The Crystal Palace in the 1950s, is in marble on a brick plinth, and is about 3 metres (9.8 ft) high. It has a moulded base, a filleted stem, and a fluted cap with a band containing two female masks. The rim is out-turned, and has scrolls and swags.	II
Chapel north of Rudding Park House; 53.97389°N 1.49235°W		1877–79	A mortuary chapel was added to the chapel in 1907. The chapel is in gritstone with a Westmorland slate roof, and is in High Victorian Gothic style. It consists of a nave with a clerestory, north and south aisles, and a chancel with side chapels. Over the junction of the nave and the chancel is a bellcote. The mortuary chapel has an octagonal plan with ornate crocketed pinnacles and a steep roof.	II
Telephone kiosk 53.96824°N 1.48068°W		1935	The K6 type telephone kiosk was designed by Giles Gilbert Scott. Constructed in cast iron with a square plan and a dome, it has three unperforated crowns in the top panels.	II
