= Revenue stamps of Fiji =

Revenue stamps of Fiji were first issued in 1871 or 1872, when the Fiji islands were an independent kingdom. The first revenue stamps consisted of postage stamps overprinted with the letter D.

After Fiji became a British crown colony in 1874, postage stamps and dual-purpose postage and revenue stamps began to be used for fiscal purposes. A new design depicting Queen Victoria and inscribed FIJI STAMP DUTY was prepared in 1880, and it was coarsely printed by the Government Printer in Sydney. The issue consists of ten stamps with values ranging from 1d to £1, and it was issued on Fiji sometime in 1883. Some stamps are known postally used, although this was contrary to regulations. This issue remained in use until 1896, when postage stamps became valid for fiscal use once again. All remaining stocks were destroyed in 1903.

Revenue-only stamps were reintroduced on 1 January 1911, when postage stamps were once again overprinted for fiscal use with a letter R and with a vertical bar cancelling the original inscription POSTAGE. The first stamps to be overprinted were those depicting King Edward VII, and after 1912 stamps depicting King George V were also similarly overprinted. Both sets exist with two different types of watermark each. In both the Edward VII and George V sets, high values were created by overprinting £1 postage stamps (the highest value available) with new values of £3, £5 or £10. Overprinting ceased in 1927 and dual-purpose stamps were subsequently used for fiscal purposes once again.

An Airport Departure Tax stamp was used in 1991.

The first plans to introduce impressed duty stamps were made in late 1876, but it is unclear what became of the order. Impressed stamps were in use by the 20th century, with recorded dates of use ranging from the 1930s to the 1970s.

== See also ==
- Postage stamps and postal history of Fiji
