= Postage stamps and postal history of Fiji =

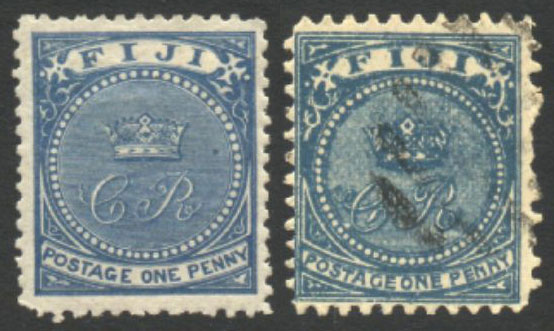
A 1871 stamp of Fiji (left) with a forgery (right)

This is a survey of the postage stamps and postal history of Fiji.

Fiji is an island nation in Melanesia in the South Pacific Ocean about 2,000 km northeast of New Zealand's North Island. It was a former British colony. A postal system was formally established in Fiji in 1871.

== Early mail and first stamps ==
Before the first postage stamps of Fiji, mail was carried by trading vessels to Sydney, Australia, and other ports, where it was placed in the mail.

The first stamps of Fiji were issued on 1 November 1870 by the local newspaper, the Fiji Times. The British Consul objected to the service and tried to close it in 1871 and appointed an official Postmaster, through the Cakobau Postal Act, and the Fiji Times service was closed in 1872.

Stamps were issued by the Kingdom of Fiji in 1871, showing a 'CR' monogram for 'Cakobau Rex', the King of Fiji.

== British colony ==
A British colony was established over Fiji in 1874. Previous issues of the Kingdom of Fiji were overprinted VR for "Victoria Regina", the royal cypher of Queen Victoria. Later issues had designs with a VR monogram. The first Fijian stamps featuring a portrait of Victoria were released in 1876.

Stamps with designs common to the British colonies were issued in 1903. The first pictorial set was issued in 1938.

Fiji achieved independence on 10 October 1970. The country celebrated its independence with the release of a stamp set, inscribed 'FIJI' on the same day.

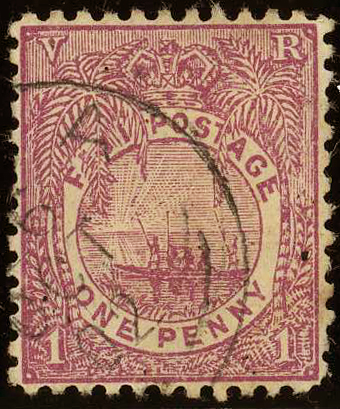
A 1891 stamp of Fiji with 'VR' at the upper corners

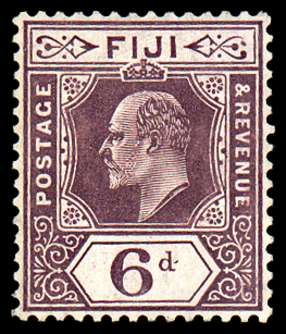
A 1910 stamp of Fiji

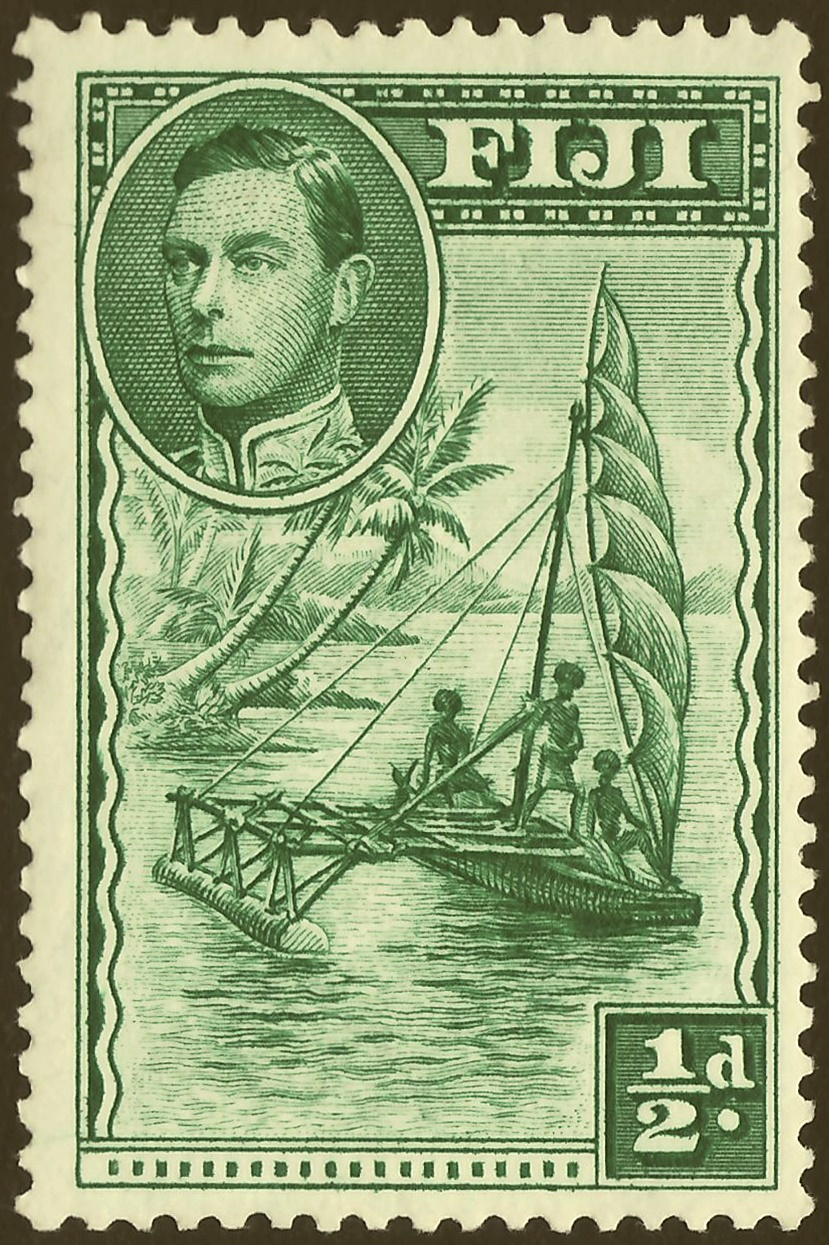
A 1938 pictorial issue

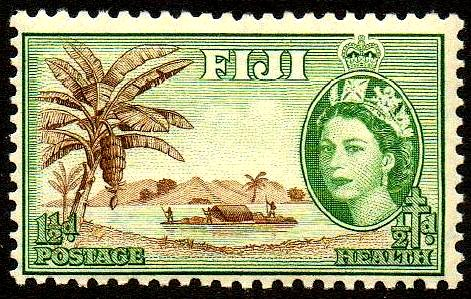
A 1954 health stamp of Fiji

== Today ==
Postal services are currently managed in Fiji by the company Post Fiji. The company was formally formed in 1871 by the Cakobau Postal Act. Isaac Mow was appointed CEO in 2024.

== See also ==
- Revenue stamps of Fiji
