= Early Closing Association =

The Early Closing Association was formed in the United Kingdom in 1842 or 1843 to control the hours of labour in retail shops. It was promoted by Samuel Carter Hall, George Dawson and John Passmore Edwards, among others. Half-day early closing was not finally won until 1912.

== Victoria (Australia) ==
A similar association was founded in Melbourne in the 1850s. Retail workers sought to reduce the number of work hours and to introduce early closing on Saturdays.
