= Richmond baronets =

Baronetcy in the Baronetage of the United Kingdom

- Coat of Arms of the Richmond baronets, of Hollington Blazon: Arms: Gules, on a fess cottised Or between two roses Argent barbed and seeded proper, a lion passant of the field.; Crest: A demi-stag proper, charged on the shoulder with a rose as in the arms, and holding between the forelegs a rose Argent, leaved and slipped, also proper.; Motto: Labor Vincit ("Labour conquers").
- Creation date: 1929
- Status: dormant
- Extinction date: 2000
- Motto: Labor Vincit

The Richmond Baronetcy, of Hollington in the County of Sussex, was a title in the Baronetage of the United Kingdom. It was created on 4 July 1929 for the businessman Sir Frederick Henry Richmond, chairman of the department stores Debenhams and Harvey Nichols.

Richmond was the son of Henry Richmond, of Walesby, and Charlotte Page, and married Dorothy Agnes Sheppard, daughter of Francis Joseph Sheppard, in 1921. An avid collector, he began assembling a notable collection of seventeenth- and eighteenth-century English needlework in 1907; on his death in 1953 it was divided among his two children, with several pieces bequeathed to the Victoria and Albert Museum.

He was succeeded by his only son, Sir John Frederick Richmond, who became the second Baronet in 1953. Educated at Eton College and Jesus College, Cambridge, the second Baronet held the rank of Lieutenant in the 10th Royal Hussars. He had no male heir, and on his death in 2000 the title became officially dormant and de facto extinct.

== Richmond baronets, of Hollington (1929) ==
- Sir Frederick Henry Richmond, 1st Baronet (1873–1953)
- Sir John Frederick Richmond, 2nd Baronet (1924–2000)

The title became dormant (and de facto extinct) on the death of the second Baronet in 2000.
