= Rigby baronets =

Title in the Baronetage of the United Kingdom

The Rigby Baronetcy, of Long Durford, Rogate, in the County of Sussex, is a title in the Baronetage of the United Kingdom. It was created on 24 June 1929 for Hugh Mallinson Rigby. He was Serjeant-Surgeon to King George V and Surgeon-in-Ordinary to the Prince of Wales, the future King Edward VIII. As of 2007 the title is held by his grandson, the third Baronet, who succeeded his father in 1999.

Escutcheon of the Rigby baronets of Long Durford

== Rigby baronets, of Long Durford (1929) ==
- Sir Hugh Mallinson Rigby, 1st Baronet (1870–1944)
- Sir (Hugh) John Macbeth Rigby, 2nd Baronet (1914–1999)
- Sir Anthony John Rigby, 3rd Baronet (born 1946)

The heir apparent is the present holder's son Oliver Hugh Rigby (born 1979).
