= Radcliffe baronets =

Baronetcy in the Baronetage of the United Kingdom

Escutcheon of the Radcliffe baronets of Milnsbridge House

The Radcliffe Baronetcy, of Milnsbridge House in the County of York, is a title in the Baronetage of the United Kingdom. It was created on 2 November 1813 for Joseph Radcliffe as a reward for his public services.

The Radcliffes were a Lancashire family and took their name from the village of Radcliffe in that county. William Radcliffe married the heiress of the Milnsbridge House estate, Milnsbridge, near Huddersfield and in 1724 bought the Marsden Moor estate. His son, Colonel William Radcliffe, died issueless in 1795 and the estates fell to his nephew, son of his sister Mary, Joseph Pickford, on the condition that he would take the name Radcliffe. Radcliffe took his uncle's name and was created a baronet in 1813.

Following his death in 1819, the Milnsbridge estate was sold and in 1824, Joseph Radcliffe the 2nd Baronet purchased an estate near Harrogate, North Yorkshire and completed the construction of Rudding Park House. The second Baronet served as High Sheriff of Yorkshire in 1857.

Everard Radcliffe, a cricketer who captained Yorkshire, was the 5th Baronet. Cardinal Timothy Radcliffe, a Catholic priest, who was created a cardinal by Pope Francis in 2024, is a cousin of the 7th Baronet.

== Radcliffe baronets, of Milnsbridge House (1813) ==
- Sir Joseph Radcliffe, 1st Baronet (1744–1819)
- Sir Joseph Radcliffe, 2nd Baronet (1799–1872)
- Sir Joseph Percival Pickford Radcliffe, 3rd Baronet (1824–1908)
- Sir Joseph Edward Radcliffe, 4th Baronet (1858–1949)
- Sir Everard Joseph Radcliffe, 5th Baronet (1884–1969)
- Sir (Joseph Benedict) Everard Henry Radcliffe, 6th Baronet (1910–1975)
- Sir Sebastian Everard Radcliffe, 7th Baronet (born 1972). His heir is his son Hugh Everard Benedict Radcliffe, born 2013.

== Milnsbridge House ==
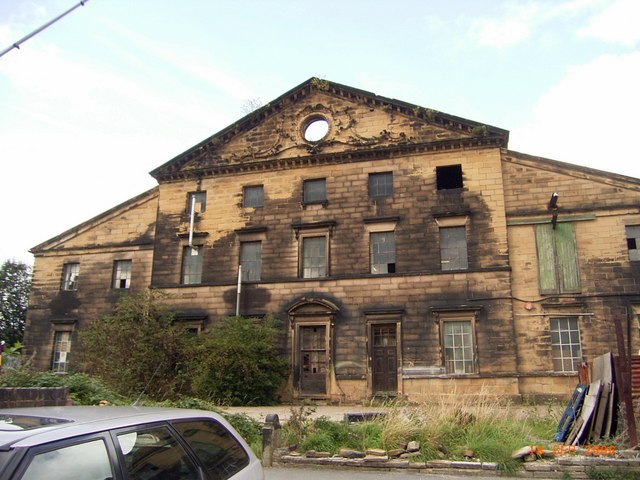
Milnsbridge House in 2006. The House is now occupied in part by an engineering firm.

The Milnsbridge manor house was built around 1756 for William Radcliffe of Milnsbridge. The mansion consisted of a central three-storey section with five windows on each floor and a pedimented roof featuring a circular window. This was flanked by two-storey wings on either side each with two windows on each floor and a sloping roof. On the grounds there were ornamental gardens, including two lakes or fishponds and a large front lawn surrounded the property. Inside, the rooms were decorated with rococo plasterwork and would have been finely furnished.

== Archives ==
The records of the Radcliffe family are held by the Leeds branch of the West Yorkshire Archive Service. The large collection comprises records from the 14th to the 20th century and includes extensive correspondence between Joseph Radcliffe, 1st Bt. and key participants of the campaigns for justice during the Luddite disturbances. Other records in the Radcliffe collection include papers of the Tichborne Trial, naval logs belonging to Admiral Sir John Talbot, papers relating to the Radcliffe estates, the Marsden Manor court rolls, and various family correspondence.

Baronetage of the United Kingdom
Preceded by Puleston baronets	Radcliffe baronets of Milnsbridge House; 2 November 1813	Succeeded by Rowley baronets
