= Rudding Park =

Country house in North Yorkshire, England

Coordinates: 53.9735°N 1.4928°W

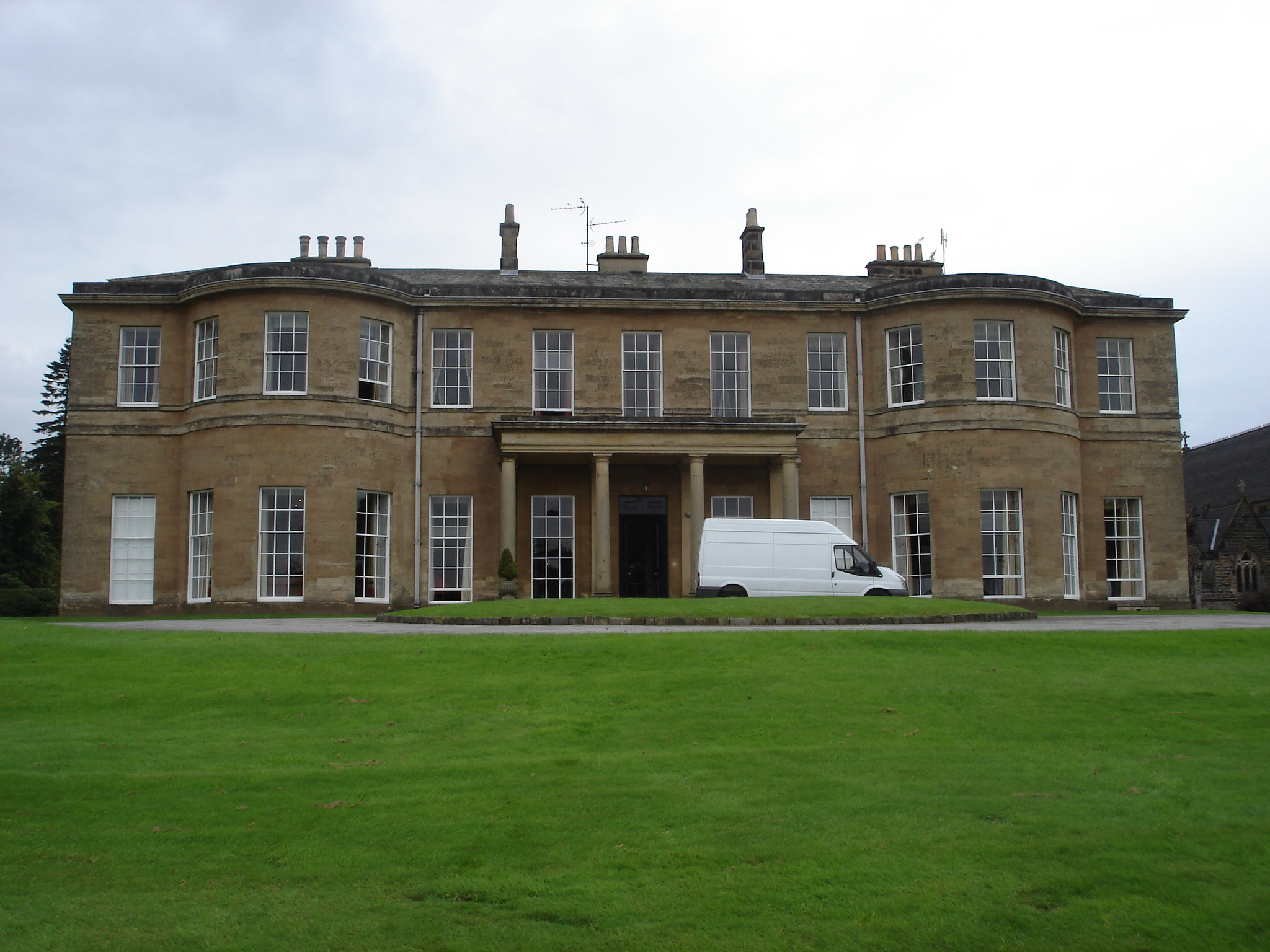
Rudding Park Hotel, Spa and Golf

Rudding Park Hotel, Spa and Golf is a Grade I listed Regency-style country house in Harrogate, North Yorkshire, England.

It is situated within the 2,000-acre (8.1 km^{2}) Rudding Park estate at Follifoot on the southern outskirts of Harrogate. It is a two-storey building made of ashlar with a Westmorland slate roof, designed in the style of the Wyatts by an unknown architect.

== Golf ==
Rudding Park has an 18-hole golf course and is located on 18th-century parkland. The Signature hole is called Rhododendron Glade and is the 14th hole. Located at the golf academy is a cutting edge golf simulation software operated by Grooves Golf where visitors can play on golf courses from around the world including Cypress Point.

== History ==
Rudding Park was originally part of the Forest of Knaresborough and still retains some of the ancient oak trees. In the early 18th century Rudding was owned in turn by Messrs Williamson of Wetherby, Craddock, James Collins (who enlarged the house and planted avenues in the park) and Thomas Wilson. In 1788 Alexander Wedderburn, Lord Loughborough, the future Lord Chancellor, acquired the estate and called in the garden designer Humphry Repton to remodel the landscape.

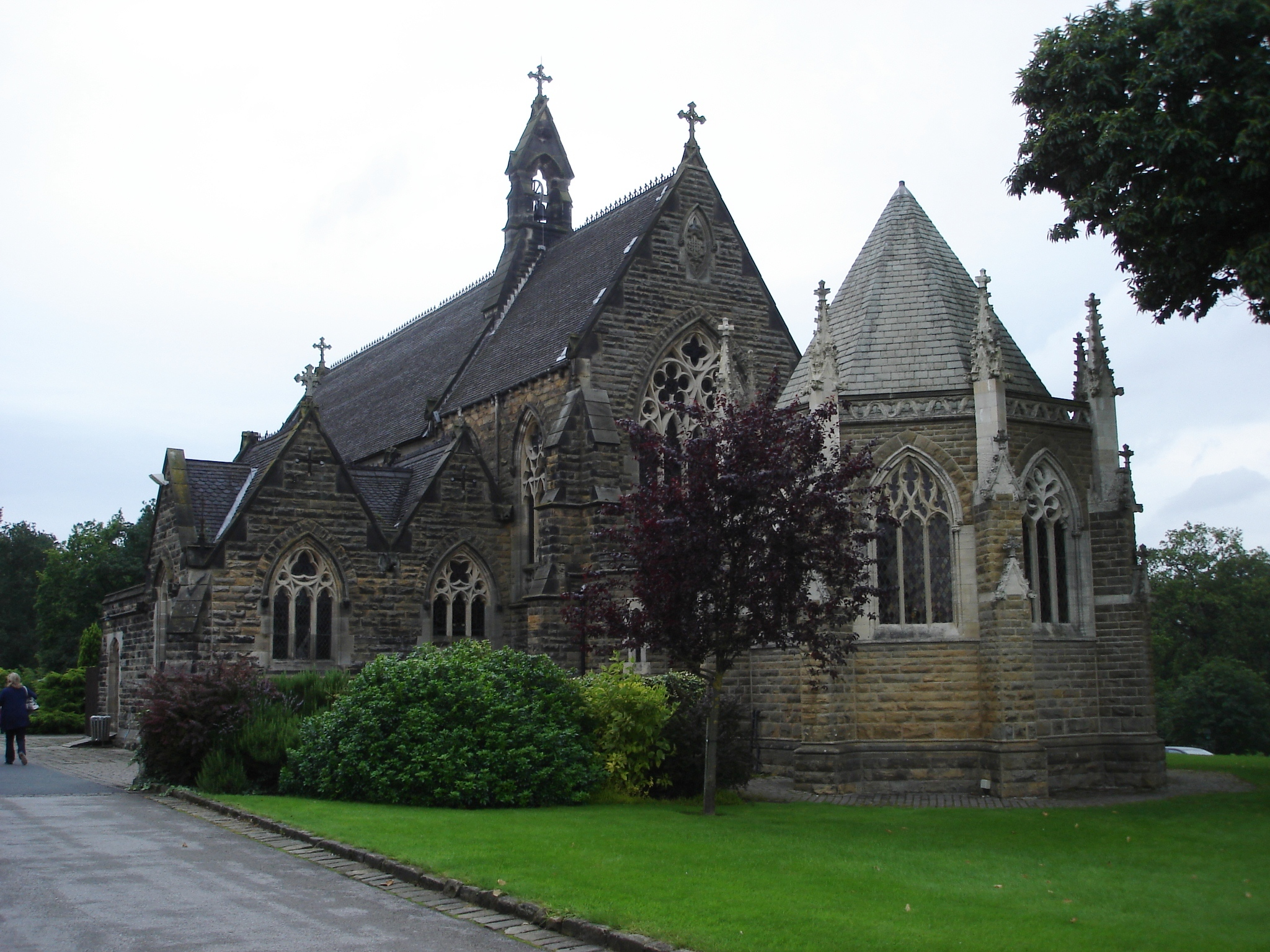
Chapel, Rudding Park

In 1805, the estate was purchased by the Hon. William Gordon, who demolished the original house and commissioned the building of the present house in a new location. In 1824 the estate was sold to Sir Joseph Radcliffe, Bt. with the new house still unfinished. He secured architect Robert Chantrell to oversee its completion. Once completed, the house consisted of two storeys, with no second floor or attic, and was made of ashlar with a Westmorland slate roof. London architect A.E. Purdie designed a Gothic Revival chapel which was built in 1874 for Sir Percival Radcliffe, the 3rd Baronet. The chapel is the size of a parish church and constructed from Aberdeen granite and alabaster. Several generations of the Radcliffe family then occupied the house for 150 years. In addition several members of the Davies family served as Coachman later driver and Carpenter for the Radcliffe family. They lived in the Dower and they are all buried at Follifoot Cemetery. Mary Clare Davies (born 1941) is currently the last living member of the Davies family who lived there when it was privately owned by the Radcliffes.

The Granada television series which screened in 1971 called Seasons of the Year was filmed here. This consisted of six plays involving the various occupants of the house over a 150-year period from the Napoleonic wars to the 1970s. In some ways this series was almost a precursor to the later TV series Brideshead Revisited, where the house was almost a character in its own right.

In 1972 the estate was acquired for £1.2m by John Howard Mackaness, a landowner, businessman and master of foxhounds. The Mackaness family remains the owners to the present day. In recent times the estate has been heavily developed, with the opening of Rudding Holiday Park in 1973 and the use of the house as a conference and banqueting centre in 1987. In the early 1980s the redundant farms buildings to the north of the site were sold for a private housing development called Rudding Dower. The grounds were occasionally used for a stage of the RAC Rally in the late 1980s.

An 18-hole golf course was opened in 1995 (complete with floodlit driving range). In 2010 an extension, the Follifoot wing, was built with an additional 40 rooms. In May 2017 a new spa building was completed with rooftop spa and gardens designed by Matthew Wilson. A gym was also added to the spa in October 2017.

== See also ==
- Grade I listed buildings in North Yorkshire (district)
- Listed buildings in Follifoot
