= Harold Percy Waller Barrow =

British general (1873–1957)

Major-General Harold Percy Waller Barrow CB CMG OBE DSO
- Born: 30 June 1876; Wellington, Madras Presidency, British India
- Died: 20 December 1957 (aged 81); Brockenhurst, Hampshire, England
- Military career
- Allegiance: United Kingdom
- Branch: British Army
- Rank: Major-General
- Unit: Royal Army Medical Corps
- Conflicts: Second Boer War; First World War; Third Anglo-Afghan War
- Awards: Companion of the Order of the Bath; Companion of the Order of St Michael and St George; Distinguished Service Order; Officer of the Order of the British Empire; Mentioned in Despatches; Legion of Honour (France)

Major-General Harold Percy Waller Barrow, CB, CMG, OBE, DSO (30 June 1876 – 20 December 1957) was a British Army officer and physician. He served as Colonel Commandant, Royal Army Medical Corps (1941–46) and was an Honorary Surgeon to King George V.

== Early life ==
Harold Percy Waller Barrow was born in Madras Presidency, India, on 30 June 1876. He was the son of an Army Surgeon, Henry John Waller Barrow, and Florence Ellie Macdonald. Barrow was educated at Bedford Modern School and Guy's Hospital, London.

== Military career ==
Barrow joined the Royal Army Medical Corps from Guy's in 1898, and was commissioned a lieutenant on 28 January 1899. The following year, he left Southampton on the SS Umbria in March 1900 to serve in the Second Boer War in South Africa, where he was attached to No. 11 General Hospital. He later served in the First World War and the Third Anglo-Afghan War in 1919.

In 1919, Barrow was appointed Director of Hygiene and Pathology in India and later Director of Hygiene at the War Office between 1924 and 1930. In 1926, he was appointed an honorary surgeon to King George V. After his retirement he was sent to Antigua as health officer and he was a member of the Federal Executive Council of the Leeward Islands from 1930 until 1933. From 1941 to 1946, he served as Colonel Commandant, Royal Army Medical Corps and from 1943 to 1952 he was a commissioner of the Royal Hospital Chelsea.

Barrow died in Brockenhurst, Hampshire, on 20 December 1957.
