= Critchett =

Critchett is a surname. Notable people with the surname include:

- Anderson Critchett (1845–1925), British eye surgeon
- Belle Christie Critchett (c. 1868–1956), American suffragist and activist
- Critchett baronets
- George Critchett (disambiguation), multiple people
- Mary Critchett (died 1729), English pirate and convict
