= George Critchett =

George Critchett may refer to:

- Sir Anderson Critchett, 1st Baronet, real name George, (1845–1925) of the Critchett baronets
- Sir (George) Montague Critchett, 2nd Baronet (1884–1941) of the Critchett baronets
- George Critchett (surgeon)

== See also ==
- Critchett (surname)
