= Sir George Robinson, 5th Baronet =

British landowner and politician (1730-1815)

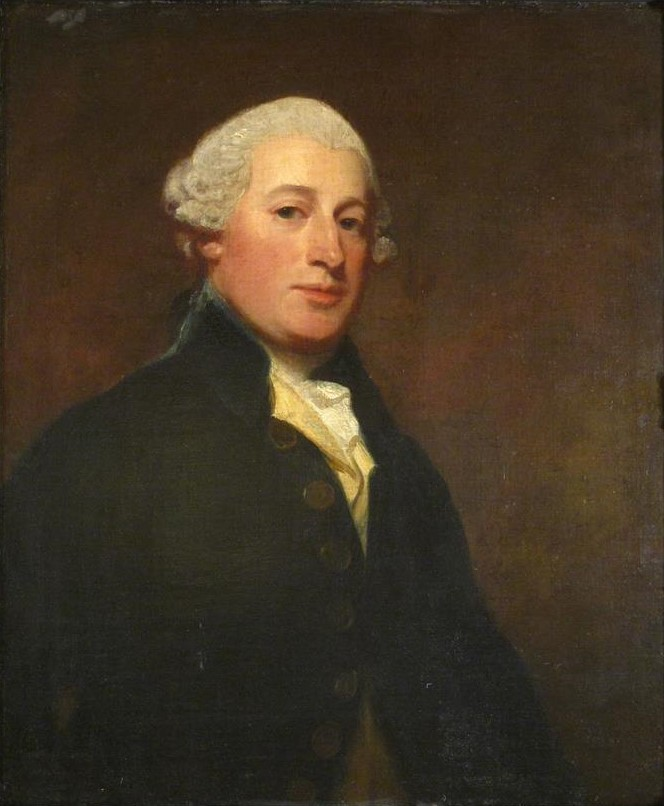
Sir George Robinson, 5th Bart. of Cranford Hall, Kettering, painting by George Romney, 1786.

Sir George Robinson, 5th Baronet (1730–1815) was a British landowner and politician who sat in the House of Commons from 1774 to 1780.

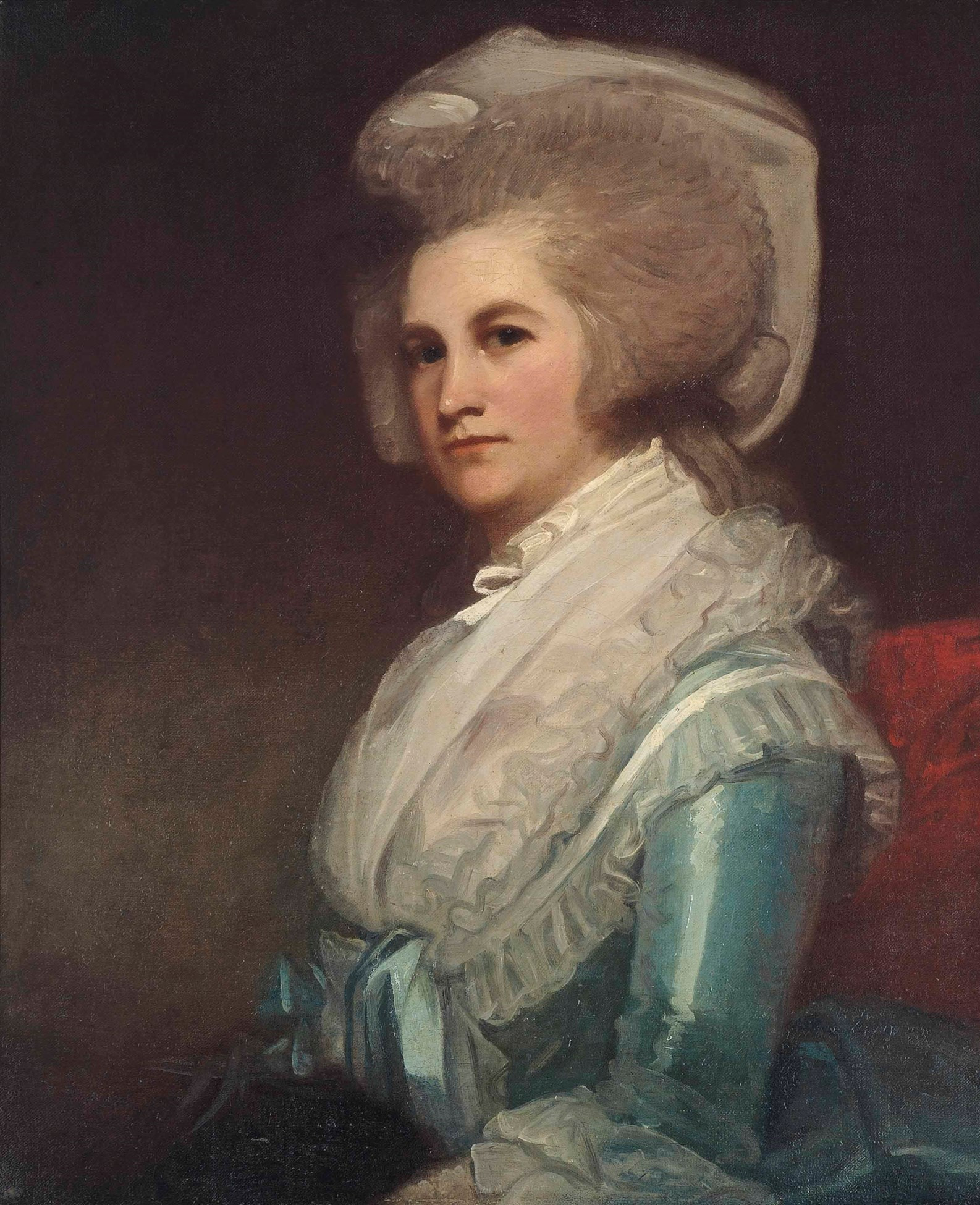
Dorothea, Lady Robinson (1739-1815), painting by George Romney, 1786.

Robinson was the son of Sir John Robinson, 4th Baronet of Cranford and his wife Mary Morgan, daughter of John Morgan of Kingsthorpe, Northamptonshire and was baptized on 27 May 1730. He was educated at Oakham School and entered Trinity College, Cambridge in 1749. In 1755 he became a fellow. He married Dorothea Chester, daughter of John Chester of Covent Garden on 2 December 1764. In 1766-67 he was High Sheriff of Northamptonshire. He succeeded his father in the baronetcy on 31 August 1766.

Robinson had inherited estates in Northamptonshire and in the 1774 general election he was returned as Member of Parliament for Northampton apparently on his own interest. He is not recorded as having spoken in the House. He did not stand again in 1780. A description was given of him as "an honest, independent country gentleman of Whig principles and inclined to Opposition".

Robinson died on 10 October 1815. He was succeeded by his son George.

Parliament of Great Britain
Preceded by Vice-Admiral Sir George Brydges Rodney; Wilbraham Tollemache	Member of Parliament for Northampton; 1774–1780; With: Wilbraham Tollemache	Succeeded by Viscount Althorp; George Rodney
Baronetage of England
Preceded by Sir John Robinson, 4th Baronet	Baronet (of London); 1765-1815	Succeeded by Sir George Robinson, 6th Baronet
