= Warmington =

Warmington may refer to:

Places

- Warmington, Northamptonshire, England
- Warmington, Warwickshire, England
  - location of Warmington Priory

People

- Brian Herbert Warmington (1924–2013), British historian
- Cinde Warmington, American politician
- Everald Warmington (born 1952), Jamaican politician
- E. H. Warmington (1898–1987), noted Latin translator
- Sir Marshall Warmington, 1st Baronet (1842–1908), English barrister and politician
- Peter Warmington (born 1934), English soccer player
- S. J. Warmington (1884-1941), British actor in the early 20th century
- William Warmington (c.1556–1627 or later), English Roman Catholic priest
- Michael Warmington (born 1971)

Title of Gentry

- Warmington baronets

== See also ==
- Walmington-on-Sea, fictional setting of sitcom Dad's Army
