= Sir Henry Robinson, 1st Baronet =

Irish civil servant

The Right Honourable Sir Henry Robinson Bt KCB

Vice-President of the Local Government Board for Ireland
- In office 1898–1922

Personal details
- Born: Henry Augustus Robinson; 20 November 1857 Dublin, Ireland
- Died: 16 October 1927 (aged 69)

Sir Henry Augustus Robinson, 1st Baronet, KCB, PC (Ire) (20 November 1857 – 16 October 1927) was an Irish civil servant.

== Life and career ==
Henry Robinson was born in Dublin, the son of Sir Henry Robinson (1823–1893) and his wife Eva (née Medora), daughter of the 10th Viscount Valentia. Although he initially started work in a London merchant's office, he followed his father into the Irish Civil Service at the age of nineteen. He served in a number of temporary positions before being appointed an inspector with the Local Government Board for Ireland, with which he remained for the rest of his career. He eventually became vice-president of the Board, a position previously held by his father and generally the body's operational leader, in 1898, and retired in 1920.

Robinson left Ireland in 1923, selling his Foxrock house, and went to live in Ealing as his life was under threat. He published a couple of volumes of memories of his Irish life in 1923–24, entitled 'Memories, Wise and Otherwise'.

He was succeeded in the baronetcy by his eldest son, Christopher. He had four granddaughters through his daughter Eva Eleanor Hone (d. 1894), including the stained glass artist Evie Hone.

== Recognition ==
Robinson was appointed Companion of the Order of the Bath (CB) in the 1897 Diamond Jubilee Honours and Knight Commander of the Order of the Bath (KCB) in the 1900 Birthday Honours. He was appointed to the Privy Council of Ireland in the November 1902 Birthday Honours, entitling him to the style "The Right Honourable". He was created a Baronet in the 1920 New Year Honours.

== Footnotes ==
Baronetage of the United Kingdom
New creation	Baronet (of Lisnacarrig); 1920–1927	Succeeded by Christopher Lynch-Robinson
