= Robinson baronets of Hawthornden and Dudley House (1908) =

Baronetcy in the Baronetage of the United Kingdom

Robinson baronets
- Escutcheon of the Robinson baronets of Hawthornden and Dudley House
- Creation date: 1908
- Status: extant
- Motto: εὕρηκα, I have found

The Robinson Baronetcy, of Hawthornden, Wynberg, in the Cape Province of South Africa, and Dudley House in the City of Westminster, was created in the Baronetage of the United Kingdom on 27 July 1908 for the South African mining magnate Joseph Robinson. He was nominated for a peerage in 1922 but declined the honour. The second Baronet was a member of the Parliament of South Africa.

== Robinson baronets, of Hawthornden and Dudley House (1908) ==
- Sir Joseph Benjamin Robinson, 1st Baronet (1840–1928)
- Sir Joseph Benjamin Robinson, 2nd Baronet (1887–1954)
- Sir Wilfred Henry Frederick Robinson, 3rd Baronet (1917–2012)
- Sir Peter Frank Robinson, 4th Baronet (born 1949)

There is no heir to the title.

== See also ==
- Robinson baronets

== Notes ==
Baronetage of the United Kingdom
Preceded by Perks baronets	Robinson baronets of Hawthornden and Dudley House; 27 July 1908	Succeeded by Warmington baronets
