= Robinson baronets of London (1660) =

Title in the Baronetage of England

Robinson baronets
- Creation date: 1660
- Created by: Charles II
- Peerage: Peerage of England
- Status: extant
- Seat: Cranford, Northamptonshire

The Robinson Baronetcy, of London, was created in the Baronetage of England on 22 June 1660 for John Robinson, Lord Mayor of London and Member of Parliament for the City of London and Rye. He was the nephew of Archbishop William Laud. The fifth and sixth Baronets both represented Northampton in the House of Commons.

== Robinson baronets, of London (1660) ==
- Sir John Robinson, 1st Baronet (1615–1680)
- Sir John Robinson, 2nd Baronet (c. 1660–c. 1693)
- Sir James Robinson, 3rd Baronet (1669–1731)
- Sir John Robinson, 4th Baronet (c. 1705–1765)
- Sir George Robinson, 5th Baronet (1730–1815)
- Sir George Robinson, 6th Baronet (1765–1833)
- Sir George Stamp Robinson, 7th Baronet (1797–1873)
- Sir John Blencowe Robinson, 8th Baronet (1830–1877)
- Sir Frederick Laud Robinson, 9th Baronet (1843–1893)
- Sir Frederick Villiers Laud Robinson, 10th Baronet (1880–1975)
- Sir John James Michael Laud Robinson, 11th Baronet (born 1943)

The heir apparent to the baronetcy is Mark Christopher Michael Villiers Robinson (born 1972), eldest son of the 11th Baronet.

== See also ==
- Robinson baronets
