= Rushpool Hall =

Listed country house

Coordinates: 54°34′33″N 0°58′20″W

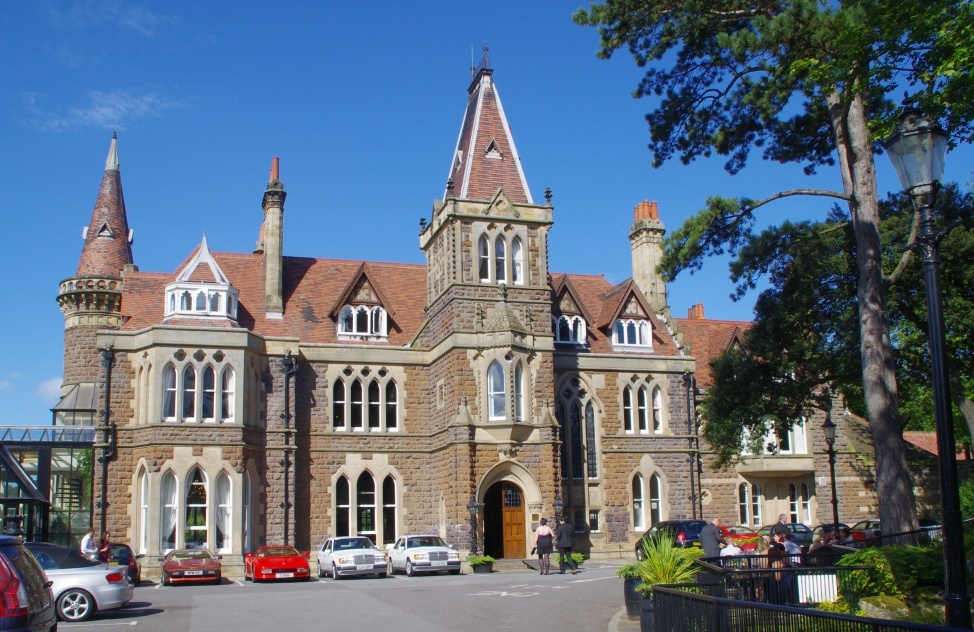

Rushpool Hall is a Grade II* listed country house located near Saltburn, North Yorkshire. It currently operates as a wedding venue.

== History ==
Rushpool Hall was built for John Bell, a local ironmaster, in 1863–4. It was constructed from local Cleveland ironstone. Following the death of John Bell the home was leased by Arthur Dorman, a local industrialist. Sir Joseph Walton acquired the home in 1904. Rushpool Hall became a boarding school for girls in 1946. It operated as a hotel by the mid-1960s. It then reverted to a private residence owned by Margaret Malone. Towards the end of the 1970s it became available for private functions, before re-opening as a hotel in the late 1980s. Jim Brennan acquired the site in 1995. Samantha Gilchrist acquired the property in 2020, and it now operates exclusively as a wedding venue.
