= Sir Joseph Robinson, 1st Baronet =

South African mining magnate who attempted to buy a peerage (1840–1929)

Sir Joseph Robinson
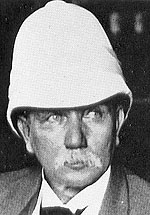
- Joseph Robinson
- Born: 3 August 1840; Cradock, Eastern Cape
- Died: 30 October 1929 (aged 89); Cape Town
- Other name: The Old Buccaneer

Sir Joseph Benjamin Robinson, 1st Baronet (3 August 1840 – 30 October 1929) was a South African gold and diamond mining magnate and Randlord.

Mayor of Kimberley, Northern Cape in 1880, which he represented in the Cape parliament for four years, chairman of the Robinson South African Banking Corporation Co, Ltd and of numeral gold mines in the Transvaal Colony, he was convicted in 1921 of fraud and fined half a million pounds. He is best remembered as having paid political fixer Maundy Gregory £30,000 (equivalent to £1.27 million in 2025), towards Prime Minister Lloyd George’s political fund, in exchange for a peerage. After the King personally complained and under public pressure, the government forced Robinson to reject the appointment. What became known as the Honours Scandal was one of the reason for the passing of the British Honours (Prevention of Abuses) Act 1925.

== Life ==
Joseph Benjamin Robinson was born in Cradock, Eastern Cape, the youngest son of Robert John Robinson and Martha.

Robinson fought on the side of the Orange Free State in the Basuto War, and later became a general trader, wool-buyer and stock-breeder at Dordrecht. Upon the discovery of diamonds in South Africa in 1867, he hastened to the Vaal River district, where, by purchasing stones from natives and afterwards by buying diamond-bearing land, notably at Kimberley, he soon acquired a considerable fortune.

His forceful business tactics came in for strong criticism, earning him the title of "Old Buccaneer" around Kimberly, but even so he became a member of the Mining Board and later chairman. He raised and commanded the Kimberley Light Horse. He was Mayor of Kimberley in 1880, and for four years was a representative of Griqualand West in the Cape parliament. Upon the discovery of gold in the Witwatersrand in 1886, Alfred Beit financed a partnership with Robinson with £25,000 (equivalent to £2.81 million in 2025). Robinson purchased the Langlaagte and Randfontein estates, but Beit soon dissolved the partnership because of Robinson's temper and business methods. Robinson chose to keep the western portion of their former joint assets, while Beit took the eastern section. His views as to the westerly trend of the main gold-bearing reef were entirely contrary to the bulk of South African opinion at the time, but events proved him to be correct, and the enormous appreciation in value of his various properties made him one of the richest men in South Africa. He founded the Randfontein Estates Gold Mining Company in 1890, which was the largest individual undertaking on the Reef and one of the largest in the world.

As a Rand capitalist he stood aloof from combinations with other gold-mining interests, and took no part in the Johannesburg reform movement, maintaining friendly relations with President Paul Kruger. He claimed that it was as the result of his representations after the Jameson Raid that Kruger appointed the Industrial Commission of 1897, whose recommendations (had they been carried out) would have remedied some of the Uitlander grievances.

Before the Second Boer War of 1899—1902 between the British Empire and the two independent Boer states, Robinson lent Kruger, leader of the Boer resistance, $1 million (equivalent to $38.7 million in 2025).

On 27 July 1908 on the recommendation of General Louis Botha, Prime Minister of the Transvaal, to Sir Henry Campbell-Bannerman, he was created a baronet. According to Andrew Roberts in relation to the controversial issue of the Chinese slave labour in the Transvaal. Winston Churchill, at the time Under-Secretary of State for the Colonial Office, wrote to Campbell-Bannerman to let him know that Robinson wanted a baronetcy, the only British hereditary honour which is not a peerage.

In 1921 the Supreme Court of South Africa found that, while chairman of the Randfontein Estates Company, Robinson had been buying the freehold of mining properties using his private account, in order to sell it back to the company for a profit, all the while concealing it from the shareholders. The Randfontein Estates sued Robinson and under judgment by the Appellate Division of the Supreme Court of South Africa, Robinson was ordered to pay over £500,000 (equivalent to £21.16 million in 2025).

== Honour scandal ==
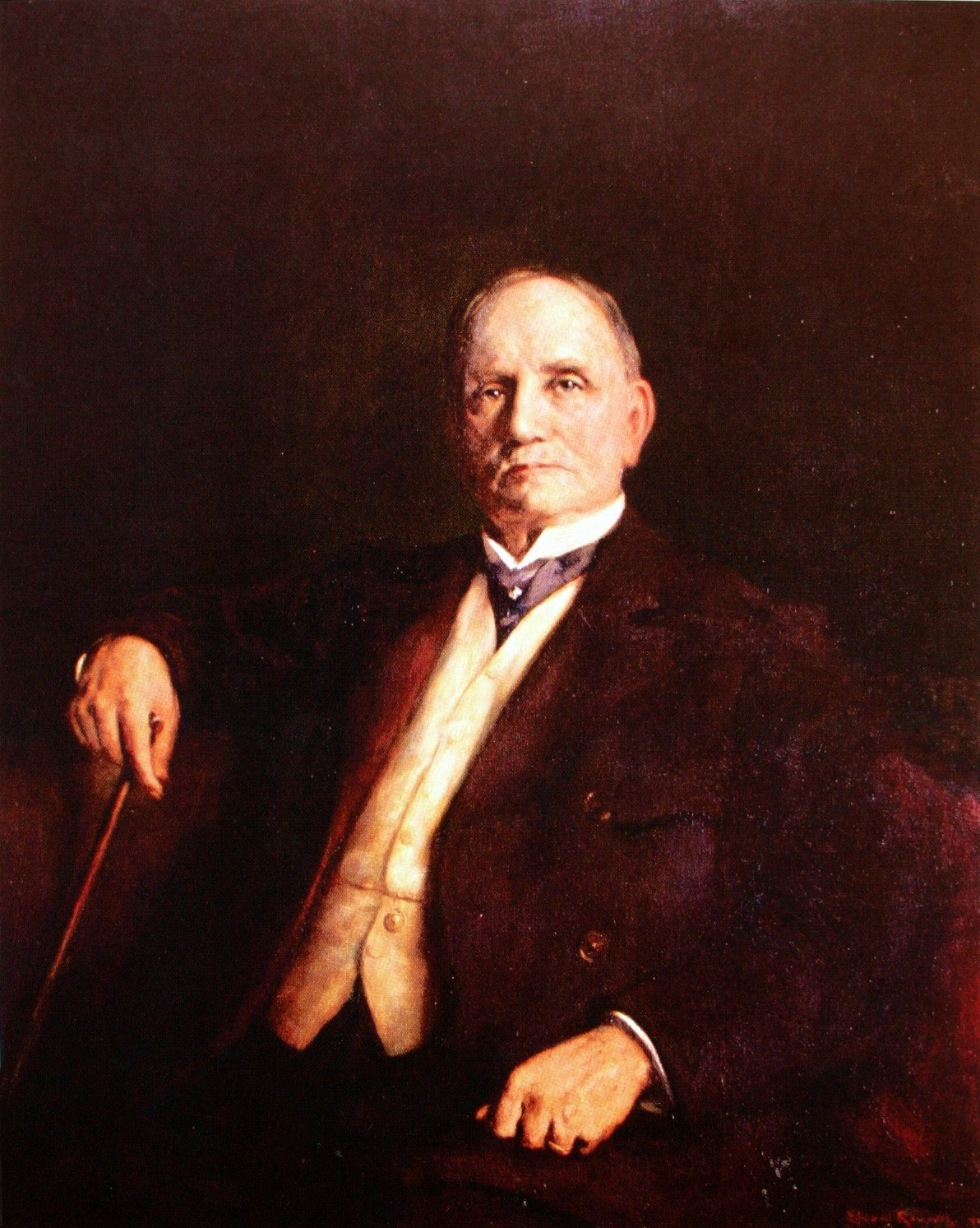
Joseph Robinson

In the 1920s, political fixer Maundy Gregory, encouraged by Prime Minister David Lloyd George, sold honours to raise money for their political fund. When during the 1922 Birthday Honours, Joseph Robinson, who was known as a war profiteer after being convicted of fraud and fined £500,000 (equivalent to £21.16 million in 2025) whose appeal had been dismissed as recently as November 1921, was nominated for a Barony, for National and Imperial Services, the British public was scandalised. Lord Buxton received the news with "universal astonishment and mystification". According to Geoffrey Wheatcroft Joseph Robinson's skullduggery was also notorious throughout South Africa, as he had been previously fined for defrauding the shareholders of his mining companies. When it was revealed that Robinson had paid Gregory £30,000 (equivalent to £1.27 million in 2025) for his peerage, officially towards Lloyd George's political fund, King George V himself objected, criticising the "questionable circumstances" in which the award had been granted.

The case of Joseph Robinson … must be regarded as little less than an insult to the Crown and to the House of Lords and may, I fear, work injury to the Prerogative in the public mind

— King George V, in a letter to Lloyd George

During the Parliament debate that followed, Lord Curzon came to also question Robinson's baronetcy of 1908, remarking that it had been granted for services rendered while chairman of a bank that was no longer in existence at the time. In June 1922 under public pressure, the government forced Robinson to reject the honour. Chief Whip F.E Guest went in person to find Robinson at the Savoy Hotel to ask him to withdraw from the Peerage list, even though his name had already been published.

I would wish if I may without discourtesy to yourself and without impropriety, to beg His Most Gracious Majesty's permission to decline the proposal.

— Joseph Robinson, in a letter to the Prime Minister read in the House of Lords on 29 June 1922.

The scandal surrounding the issue tarnished the Coalition government's image, and was somewhat responsible for the Conservatives detachment of Lloyd George's Liberals from the party, later in 1922. The general scandal of sale of peerages led to the Honours (Prevention of Abuses) Act 1925.

== Later life and death ==
Joseph Robinson died at his home, Hawthorndon House, Wynberg, Cape Colony, on 30 October 1929, at the age of 89.

== Family ==
Joseph Benjamin Robinson was the son of Robert John Robinson (1792–1886) and Martha Rozina Strutt. He had five brothers and nine sisters.

He married Elizabeth Rebecca Ferguson, daughter of James Ferguson, on 3 October 1877 in Kimberly, South Africa. She was born 4 November 1859 in Victoria West, and died 30 March 1930 in Muizenberg, South Africa. They had 11 children including Ida, who married the Italian Ambassador to South Africa, Count Natale Teodato Labia the descendants of whom still reside at Robinson's Cape Town home Hawthorndon House

J.B. Robinson's death in 1929 caused a great scandal in South Africa and Britain upon discovery of his will. His personal fortune of £12 million was given to his heirs except one of his daughters, who was only given a mere £2000. He gave nothing to charity. There was a scathing article in the Cape Times after his death.

== Legacy ==
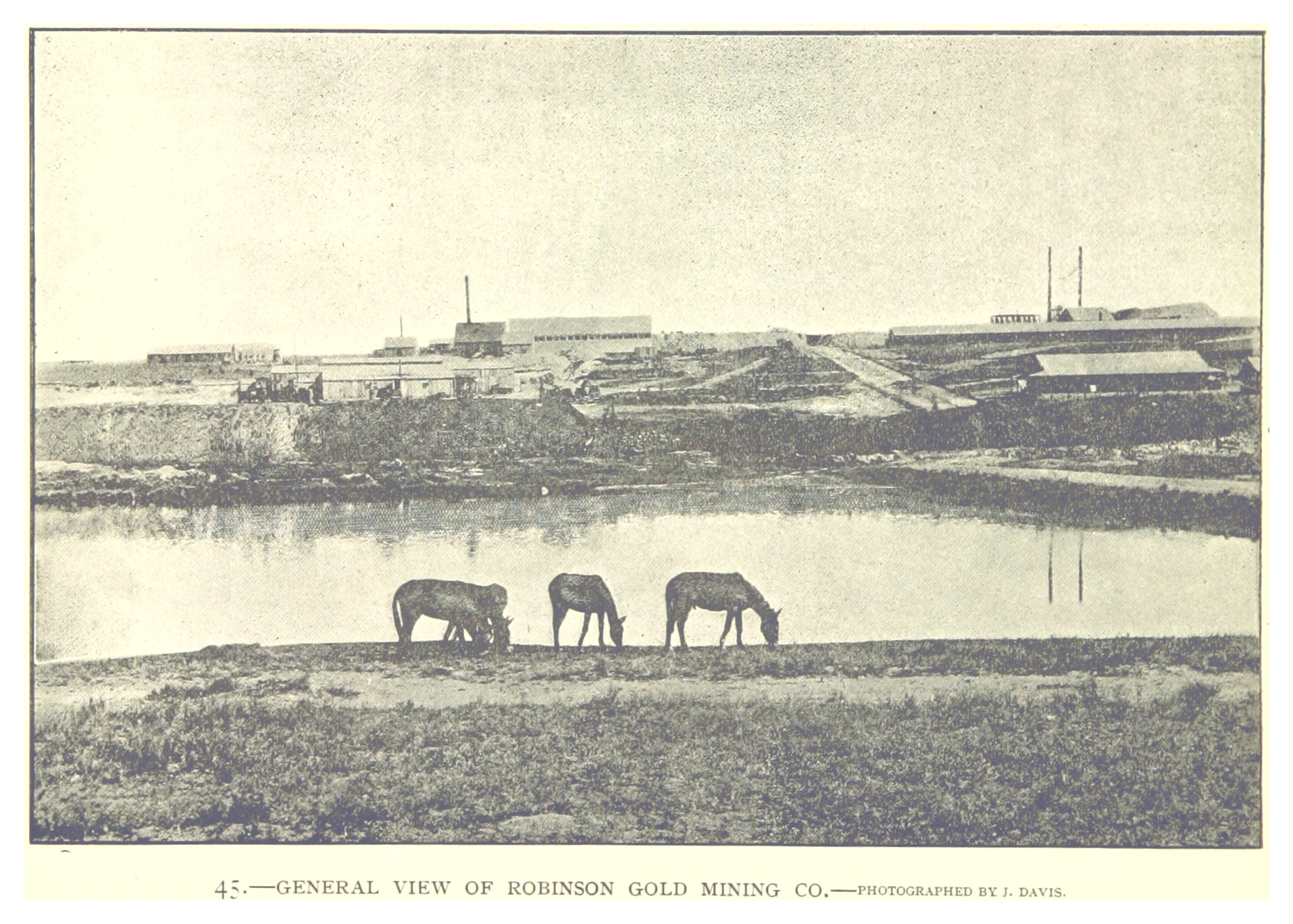
ROBINSON GOLD MINING CO. (c.1890)

Kensington, Johannesburg has a street named for him. Tsessebe House is there, a boarding house of the prestigious Jeppe High School for Boys.

Baronetage of the United Kingdom
New creation	Baronet (of Hawthornden and Dudley House); 1908–1929	Succeeded by Joseph Benjamin Robinson
