= Sir George Robinson, 6th Baronet =

British landowner and Member of Parliament (1766-1833)

Sir George Robinson, 6th Baronet (12 January 1766 – 23 November 1833) was a British landowner and Member of Parliament.

He was born the son of Sir George Robinson, 5th Baronet of Cranford, Northamptonshire and educated at Harrow School (1775–79), Trinity College, Cambridge (1783) and trained in the law at the Middle Temple (1785). He succeeded his father in 1815, inheriting, in addition to the baronetcy, Cranford Hall, Northamptonshire and Stretton Hall, Leicestershire.

He was appointed High Sheriff of Leicestershire for 1820–21 and elected MP for Northampton in 1830, sitting until 1832.

Sir George Robinson died in 1833. He had never married and was succeeded by his nephew George Stamp Robinson (1797–1873).

Baronetage of England
Preceded by George Robinson	Baronet (of London); 1815–1833	Succeeded by George Stamp Robinson
