= John Charles Bell =

British businessman and Lord Mayor of London

Sir John Charles Bell Bt
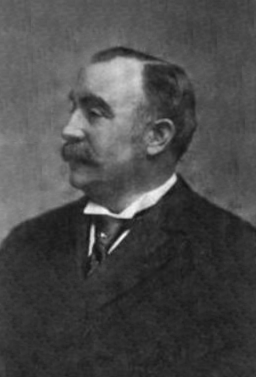
- In The Sketch, 9 October 1901

Lord Mayor of London
- In office 1907–1908

Sheriff of the City of London
- In office October 1901 – September 1902

Personal details
- Born: 4 September 1843
- Died: 2 February 1924 (aged 80) Stoke Poges, England
- Occupation: Businessman, politician

Sir John Charles Bell, 1st Baronet (1843–1924) was a British businessman and Lord Mayor of London from 1907 to 1908.

== Biography ==
John Charles Bell was born on 4 September 1843. A brewer with the firm trading as Glover, Bell & Co., he became chairman and managing director of the limited company Wenlock Brewery Co. of Hoxton.

Bell was elected a Sheriff of the City of London in 1901 (serving October 1901 to September 1902), together with Horace Brooks Marshall. He was Sheriff during the coronation year 1902, and was knighted in the 1902 Coronation Honours, receiving the accolade from King Edward VII at Buckingham Palace on 24 October that year. During his year as Sheriff, he also accompanied the Lord Mayor (Sir Joseph Dimsdale) on official visits to the English cities of Wolverhampton (July 1902), Bath and Exeter (September 1902).

Five years later, he was elected Lord Mayor of the City of London in 1907 (serving November 1907 to November 1908). For his service as Lord Mayor he was by custom created a Baronet, of Framewood in the Parish of Stoke Poges in the County of Buckingham, on 18 July 1908. The title became extinct on his death, which took place at his home in Stoke Poges on 2 February 1924.

Escutcheon of the Bell baronets of Framewood

Civic offices
Preceded by Sir William Treloar	579th Lord Mayor of London; 1907–1908	Succeeded by Sir George Wyatt Truscott
Baronetage of the United Kingdom
New creation	Baronet (of Framewood in the Parish of Stoke Poges in the County of Buckingham); 1908–1924	Extinct
Preceded by Warmington baronets	Bell baronets of Framewood; 25 November 1908	Succeeded by Low baronets
