= Arthur Dorman =

English industrialist (1848–1931)

Sir Arthur Dorman Bt KBE
- Born: Arthur John Dorman; 8 August 1848; Ashford, Kent, England
- Died: 12 February 1931 (aged 82); Nunthorpe, Middlesbrough, England
- Education: Christ's Hospital
- Engineering career
- Discipline: Industrialist
- Employer: Dorman Long

Sir Arthur John Dorman, 1st Baronet, KBE (8 August 1848 – 12 February 1931) was an English industrialist.

== Early life ==
Dorman was born on 8 August 1848, at Ashford, Kent, eldest son of Charles Dorman (1809–1885), of Ashford and Maidstone, a currier in the leather trade, and Emma (died 1914), daughter of Richard Wilson Page. He was educated at Christ's Hospital, then situated in Newgate, London.

== Career ==
He was sent, at the age of 22, by his family to work at a Stockton-on-Tees ironworks, where a relative was a partner. Dorman started as a puddler and rapidly progressed in his career. In 1875, he went into partnership with Albert de Lande Long to acquire the West Marsh Ironworks in Middlesbrough. During the 1880s, they exploited the new steelmaking technologies being introduced at that time, including the use of Open hearth furnaces. Together they built a large industrial concern, Dorman Long, which, by 1914, employed 20,000 people and during the World War I was a major supplier of shells.

He stood for Parliament, only once, as the Conservative candidate for Cleveland, in 1892. He lost the election gaining 4.2% less than his rival, Henry Fell Pease.

Dorman was appointed a Knight Commander of the Order of the British Empire (KBE) in 1918 and created a baronet of Nunthorpe in the County of York in the 1923 Birthday Honours.

== Family ==
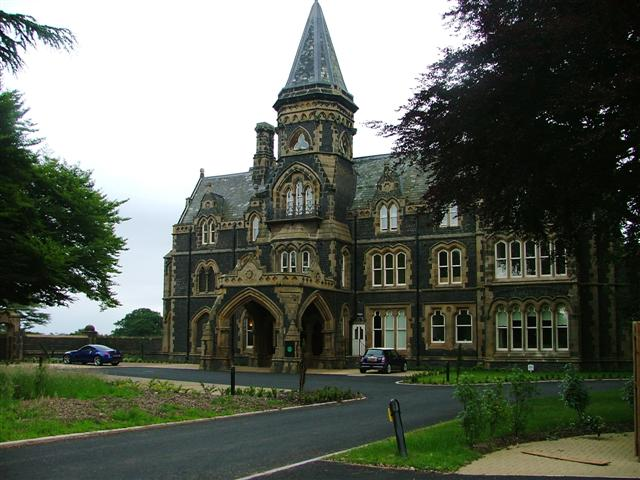
Grey Towers

In 1873, he married Clara Share (died 1933), daughter of George Lockwood, JP, of Stockton-on-Tees. They had four sons and three daughters. His youngest son, George Lockwood Dorman, was killed in the Second Boer War, and is commemorated in the Dorman Museum.

Sir Arthur Dorman died on 12 February 1931, aged 82, at Grey Towers, his home in Nunthorpe, near Middlesbrough.

Baronetage of the United Kingdom
New creation	Baronet (of Nunthorpe); 1923–1931	Succeeded by Bedford Dorman
