= Marshall Warmington =

English barrister and politician

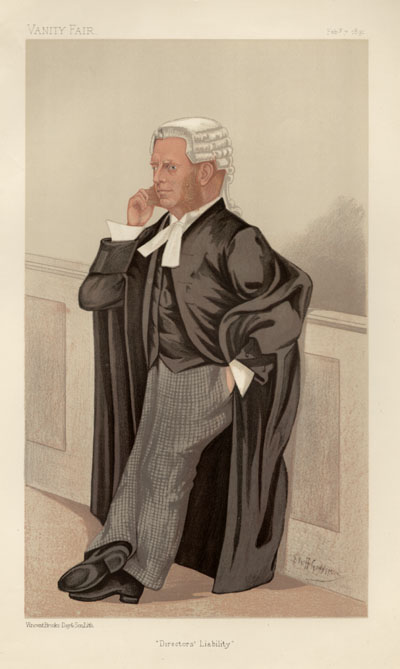
"Directors' liability", Caricature by "Stuff" in Vanity Fair, 1891

Sir Cornelius Marshall Warmington, 1st Baronet QC (5 June 1842 – 12 December 1908) was an English barrister and Liberal politician.

Warmington was born at Colchester, Essex. He became a member of the Middle Temple and was invested as Queen's Counsel in 1882. In 1885 he was elected as Member of Parliament for West Monmouthshire. He held the seat for 10 years, and gave it up in 1895 to make way for William Vernon Harcourt. Warmington was at various times Treasurer and Master of Middle Temple. He was created a baronet, of Pembridge Square, on 28 July 1908, six months before his death.

Warmington married Anne Winch daughter of Edward Winch of Chatham and they had a family. His son Denham succeeded to the baronetcy.

Parliament of the United Kingdom
New constituency	Members of Parliament for West Monmouthshire; 1885 – 1895	Succeeded by William Vernon Harcourt
Baronetage of the United Kingdom
New creation	Baronet (of Pembridge Square); 1908	Succeeded by Denham Warmington
