= Monmouth constituency =

Monmouth constituency may refer to any one of several constituencies related to the county of Monmouth and the borough of Monmouth, Wales:

- Monmouthshire (UK Parliament constituency), 1801 to 1885, county constituency, previously, 1707 to 1801, county constituency of the Parliament of Great Britain and, until 1707, county constituency of the Parliament of England
- Monmouth borough, 1545 to 1832, which despite its name was a district of boroughs consisting of Monmouth, Newport and Usk and electing one MP to the Parliament of England (1545-1707), Great Britain (1707-1800) and the United Kingdom (1801-1832)
- Monmouth Boroughs (UK Parliament constituency), 1832 to 1918, a renaming of the previous Monmouth borough constituency
- North Monmouthshire (UK Parliament constituency), 1885 to 1918, created as a county constituency division of the county
- South Monmouthshire (UK Parliament constituency), 1885 to 1918, created as a county constituency division of the county
- West Monmouthshire (UK Parliament constituency), 1885 to 1918, created as a county constituency division of the county
- Monmouth (UK Parliament constituency), 1918 to 2024, created as a county constituency division of the county of Monmouth, redefined 1983 as a county constituency division of the preserved county of Gwent, and superseded in 2024
- Monmouthshire (UK Parliament constituency), created by the 2023 Periodic Review of Westminster constituencies and first contested at the 2024 general election
- Abertillery (UK Parliament constituency), 1918 to 1983, created as a county constituency division of the county of Monmouth
- Ebbw Vale (UK Parliament constituency), 1918 to 1983, created as a county constituency division of the county of Monmouth
- Pontypool (UK Parliament constituency), 1918 to 1983, created as a county constituency division of the county of Monmouth
- Newport (Monmouthshire) (UK Parliament constituency), 1918 to 1983, created as a borough constituency of the county of Monmouth
- Monmouth (Senedd constituency), 1999 to present, created with the 1999 boundaries of the Monmouth UK Parliament constituency dating from 1918
