= Rose baronets of Hardwick House (1909) =

The Rose baronetcy, of Hardwick House in Whitchurch in the County of Oxford, was created in the Baronetage of the United Kingdom on 19 July 1909 for the businessman and Liberal politician Charles Rose. He was the second son of the 1st Baronet of the 1872 creation. The 4th Baronet inherited that title in 1979.

== Rose baronets, of Hardwick House (1909) ==
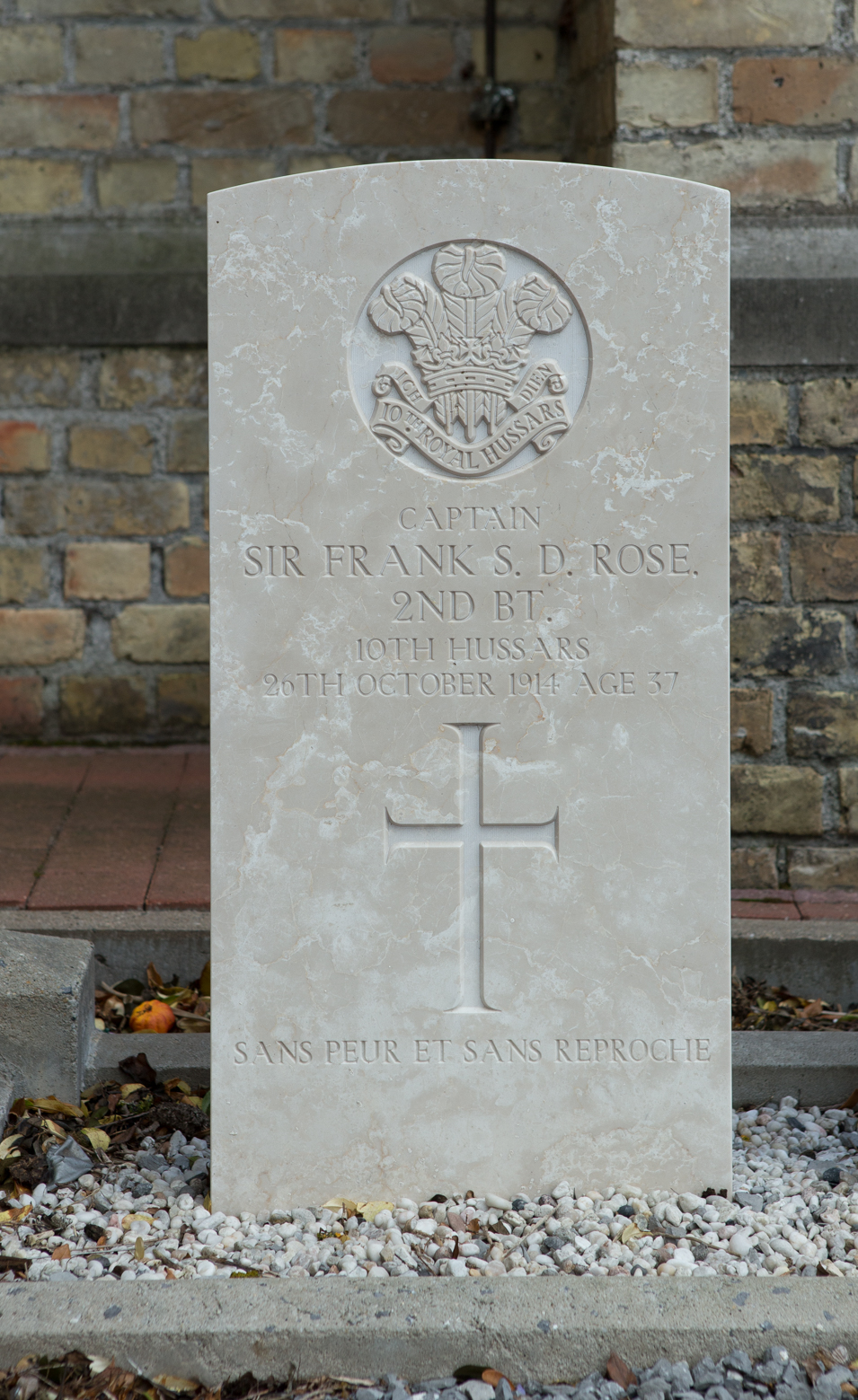
Grave of Sir Frank Stanley Rose, 2nd Baronet in Zandvoorde churchyard

- Sir Charles Day Rose, 1st Baronet (1847–1913)
- Sir Frank Stanley Rose, 2nd Baronet (1877–1914)
- Sir Charles Henry Rose, 3rd Baronet (1912–1966)
- Sir Julian Day Rose, 4th Baronet (born 1947), also succeeded as 5th Baronet of Montreal in 1979.

The heir apparent to both the Rose Baronetcy of Montreal and the Rose Baronetcy of Hardwick House is Lawrence Michael Rose (born 1986), only son of the current holder.

== Notes ==
Baronetage of the United Kingdom
Preceded by Scarisbrick baronets	Rose baronets of Hardwick House; 19 July 1909	Succeeded by Firth baronets
