= Morrison-Low baronets =

Title of nobility in United Kingdom

The Low, later Morrison-Low Baronetcy, of Kilmaron in the County of Fife, is a title in the Baronetage of the United Kingdom. It was created on 27 November 1908 for Sir James Low, managing director of Lindsay & Low of Carolina Port, manufacturers of jams, bread and confectionery. The son of William Low and his wife Janet, daughter of Alexander Morrison, he was Lord Provost of Dundee from 1893 to 1896.

The 2nd Baronet assumed by deed poll in 1924 the additional surname of Morrison. As of 2026 the title is held by his grandson, the 4th Baronet, who succeeded his father in 2012.

== Low, later Morrison-Low baronets, of Kilmaron (1908) ==
- Sir James Low, 1st Baronet (1849–1923)
- Sir Walter John Morrison-Low, 2nd Baronet (1899–1955)
- Sir James Richard Morrison-Low, 3rd Baronet (1925–2012)
- Sir Richard Walter Morrison-Low, 4th Baronet (born 1959)

The heir apparent is the 4th Baronet's son Rory James Morrison-Low, b. 1997.

Baronetage of the United Kingdom
Preceded by Bell baronets	Low baronets of Kilmaron; 27 November 1908	Succeeded by Critchett baronets
