= Robinson baronets of Long Melford (1682) =

English baronetcy

Robinson baronets
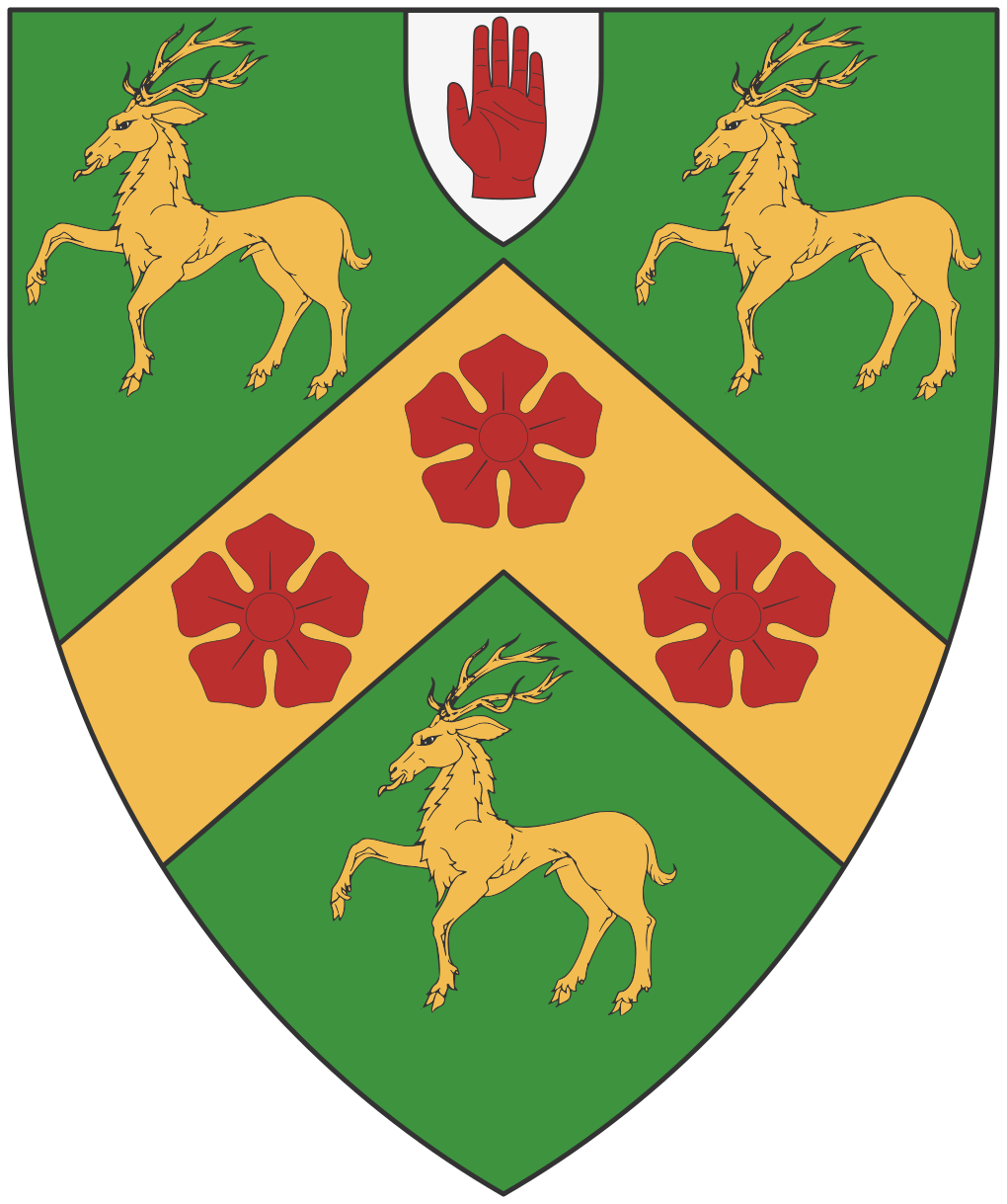
- Arms of Robinson of Long Melford
- Creation date: 1682
- Status: extinct
- Extinction date: 1743
- Seat: Kentwell Hall
- Arms: vert, on a chevron between three bucks trippant or, three cinquefoils gules

The Robinson Baronetcy, of Long Melford in the County of Suffolk, was created in the Baronetage of England on 26 January 1682 for Thomas Robinson. The title became extinct on the death of the third Baronet in 1743.

== Robinson baronets, of Long Melford (1682) ==
- Sir Thomas Robinson, 1st Baronet (c. 1618–1683)
- Sir Lumley Robinson, 2nd Baronet (c.1649–1684). He was buried in Westminster Abbey.
- Sir Thomas Robinson, 3rd Baronet (1681–1743)

== See also ==
- Robinson baronets
