= Hawthorndon House =

Historic property in Cape Town, South Africa

Hawthornden House
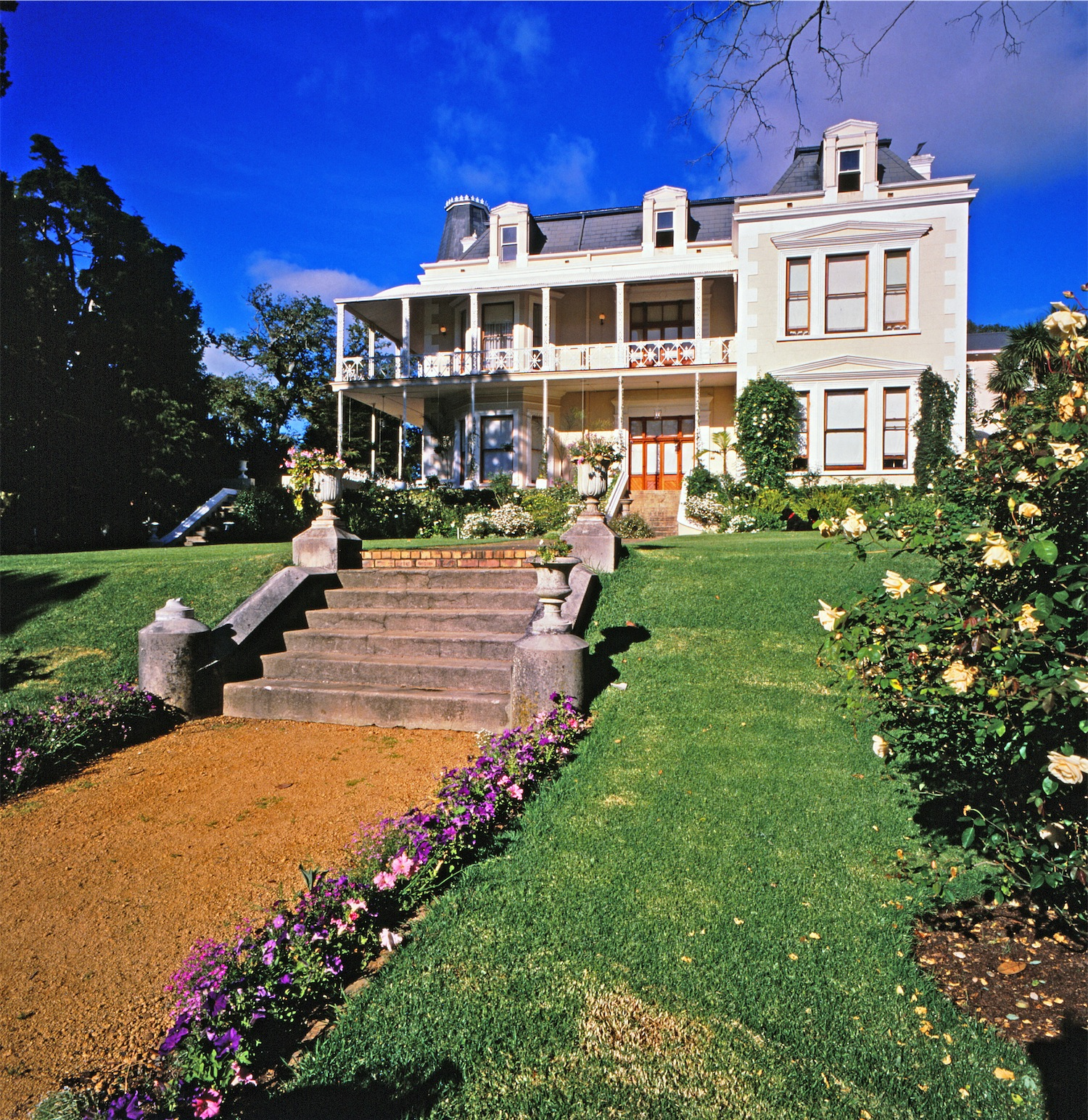
- Hawthornden House from its garden
- Interactive map of the Hawthornden House area

General information
- Location: Herschell Walk, Wynberg, Cape Town, South Africa
- Coordinates: 33.9979°S 18.4577°E
- Current tenants: Labia Family
- Year built: 1683
- Client: John Spence
- Owner: Western Cape Government

Hawthornden House is a double-storeyed house on Herschel Walk in the suburb of Wynberg in Cape Town, South Africa. The house likely dates from 1683, but was substantially rebuilt in the French Victorian style in 1881 by a Capt. John Spence.

It was bought by the Randlord Sir J.B. Robinson in 1891 and was where he lived until his death in 1927. Count Natale Labia, grandson of J.B. Robinson, donated Hawthornden to what is now the Government of the Western Cape in 1978, but continued to live there until his death in 2016.

The site was declared a national monument in 1983 and became a provincial heritage site in 2000 when the legislation changed. In 2014 the area protected was extended to include the entire remaining gardens.

Hawthornden is one of the major surviving examples of high style Victorian domestic architecture in Cape Town. It is a private dwelling and is not open to the public.

== See also ==
- List of heritage sites in South Africa
- Heritage Western Cape
