= Rose baronets of Montreal (1872) =

Baronetcy

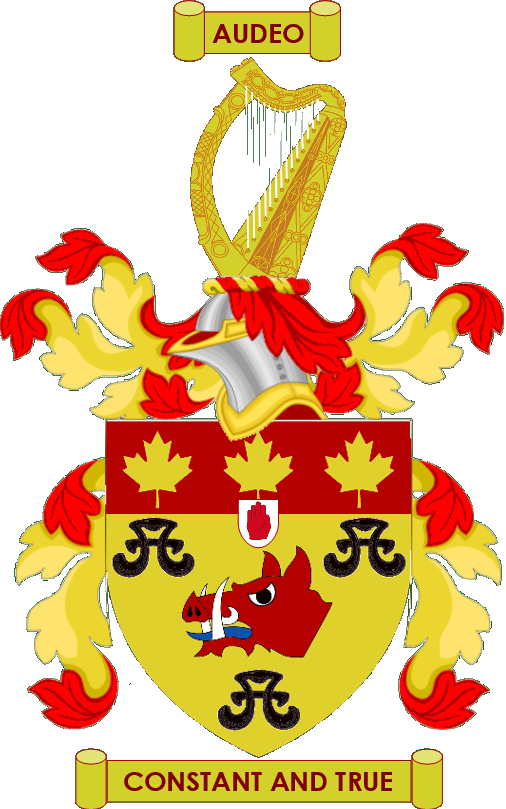
- Crest: A harp Or stringed Argent.
- Shield: Or a boar’s head couped Gules between three water bougets Sable on a chief of the second as many maple leaves of the first.
- Motto: Audeo, and Constant and True

The Rose baronetcy of Montreal in the Dominion of Canada, was created in the Baronetage of the United Kingdom on 9 September 1872 for the Canadian barrister and politician John Rose.

On the death of the 4th Baronet in 1979 the title passed to Sir Julian Rose, 4th Baronet, of the 1909 creation.

== Rose baronets, of Montreal (1872) ==
- Sir John Rose, 1st Baronet (1820–1888)
- Sir William Rose, 2nd Baronet (1846–1902)
- Sir Cyril Stanley Rose, 3rd Baronet (1874–1915)
- Sir Francis Cyril Rose, 4th Baronet (1909–1979)
- Sir Julian Day Rose, 5th Baronet (born 1947), from 1966 4th Baronet of Hardwick House.

The heir apparent to this baronetcy and the Rose baronetcy of Hardwick House is Lawrence Michael Rose (born 1986), only son of the current baronet.
