= Dorman baronets =

Baronetcy in the Baronetage of the United Kingdom

Arms of Dorman baronets in 1923

The Dorman Baronetcy, of Nunthorpe in the County of York, is a title in the Baronetage of the United Kingdom. It was created on 21 July 1923 for the steel manufacturer Arthur Dorman. He was the founder and chairman of Dorman Long & Co, of Middlesbrough.

== Dorman baronets, of Nunthorpe (1923) ==
- Sir Arthur John Dorman, 1st Baronet (1848–1931)
- Sir Bedford Lockwood Dorman, 2nd Baronet (1879–1956)
- Sir Charles Geoffrey Dorman, 3rd Baronet (1920–1996)
- Sir Philip Henry Keppel Dorman, 4th Baronet (born 1954)

There is no heir to the baronetcy.
