= Lynch-Robinson baronets =

Baronetcy in the Baronetage of the United Kingdom

The Robinson, later Lynch-Robinson Baronetcy, of Lisnacarrig, Foxrock in the County of Dublin, is a title in the Baronetage of the United Kingdom. It was created on 30 January 1920 for Sir Henry Robinson, KCB, vice-president of the Local Government Board for Ireland from 1898 to 1920. The second Baronet assumed in 1947 by deed poll the additional surname of Lynch.

== Robinson, later Lynch-Robinson baronets, of Lisnacarrig (1920) ==
- Sir Henry Augustus Robinson, 1st Baronet (1857–1927)
- Sir Christopher Henry Lynch-Robinson, 2nd Baronet (1884–1958)
- Sir Niall Bryan Lynch-Robinson, 3rd Baronet DSC (1918–1996)
- Sir Dominick Christopher Lynch-Robinson, 4th Baronet (1948–2025)
- Sir Christopher Henry Jake Lynch-Robinson, 5th Baronet (born 1977)
