= Warmington baronets =

Title in the Baronetage of the United Kingdom

The Warmington baronetcy, of Pembridge Square in the Royal Borough of Kensington, is a title in the Baronetage of the United Kingdom. It was created on 28 July 1908 for Marshall Warmington, Liberal Party Member of Parliament for West Monmouthshire from 1885 to 1895.

== Warmington baronets, of Pembridge Square (1908) ==
- Sir Cornelius Marshall Warmington, 1st Baronet (1842–1908)
- Sir (Marshall) Denham Warmington, 2nd Baronet (1871–1935)
- Sir Marshall George Clitheroe Warmington, 3rd Baronet (1910–1995)
- Sir Marshall Denham Malcolm Warmington, 4th Baronet (1934–1996)
- Sir David Marshall Warmington, 5th Baronet (1944–2005)
- Sir Rupert Marshall Warmington, 6th Baronet (born 1969)

The heir apparent is the current holder's son Oliver Charles Warmington (born 2004).

Baronetage of the United Kingdom
Preceded by Robinson baronets	Warmington baronets of Hawthornden and Dudley House; 28 July 1908	Succeeded by Bell baronets
