= Robinson baronets =

There have been eleven baronetcies created for persons with the surname Robinson, four in the Baronetage of England, one in the Baronetage of Great Britain and six in the Baronetage of the United Kingdom. As of 2008 two of the creations were extant, while one was dormant.

- Robinson baronets of London (1660)
- Robinson baronets of Newby (1660)
- Robinson baronets of Long Melford (1682)
- Robinson baronets of Newby (1690): see Marquess of Ripon
- Robinson baronets of Rokeby Park (1730): see Baron Rokeby
- Robinson baronets of Rokeby Hall (1819)
- Robinson baronets of Batts House (1823)
- Robinson baronets of Toronto (1854)
- Robinson baronets of Rosmead (1891): see Baron Rosmead
- Robinson baronets of Hawthornden and Dudley House (1908)
- Robinson, later Lynch-Robinson baronets, of Foxrock (1920): see Lynch-Robinson baronets
