= George Critchett (surgeon) =

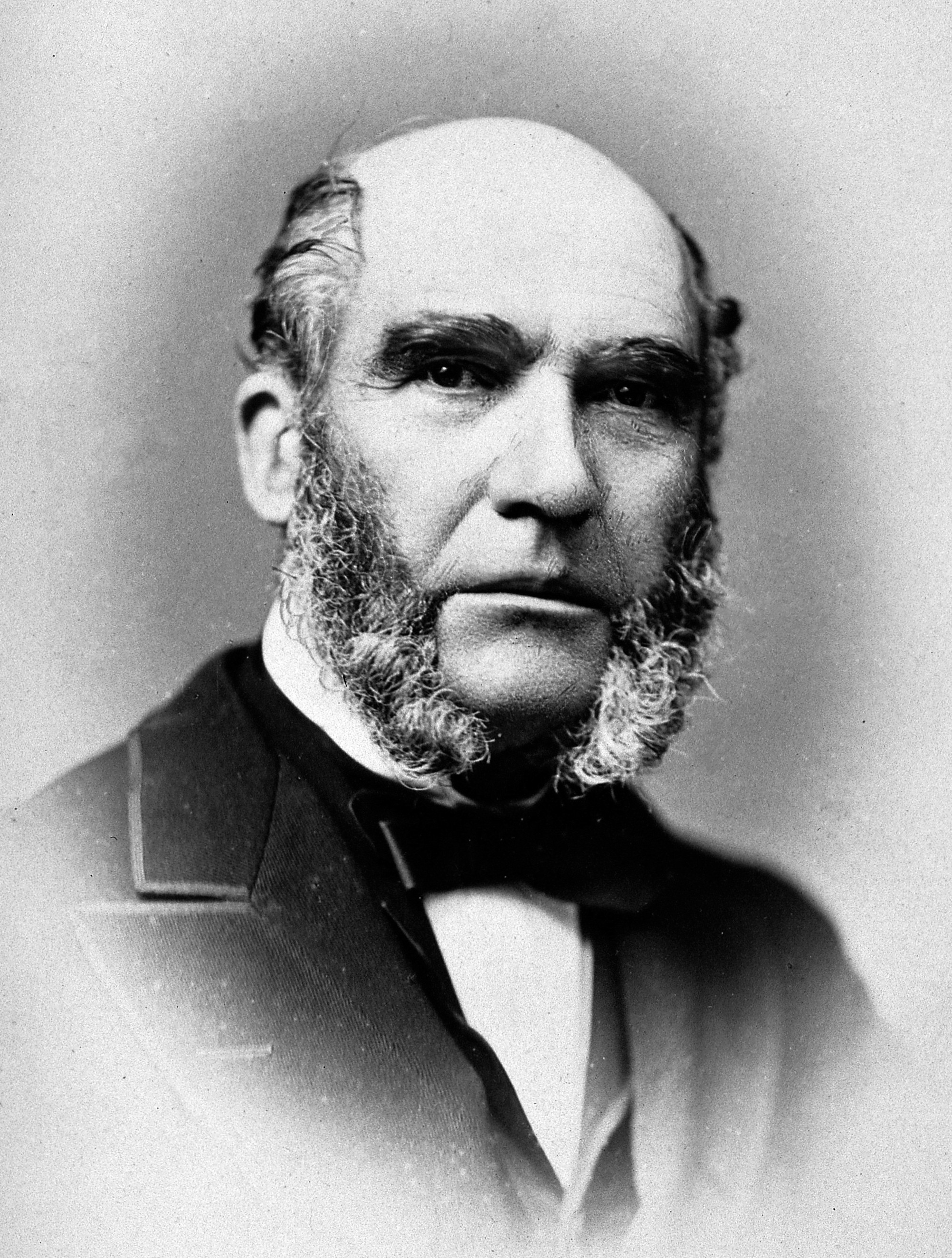
George Critchett in 1881

George Critchett (c. 1817 in Highgate – 1 November 1882, in London) was an ophthalmic surgeon.

== Biography ==
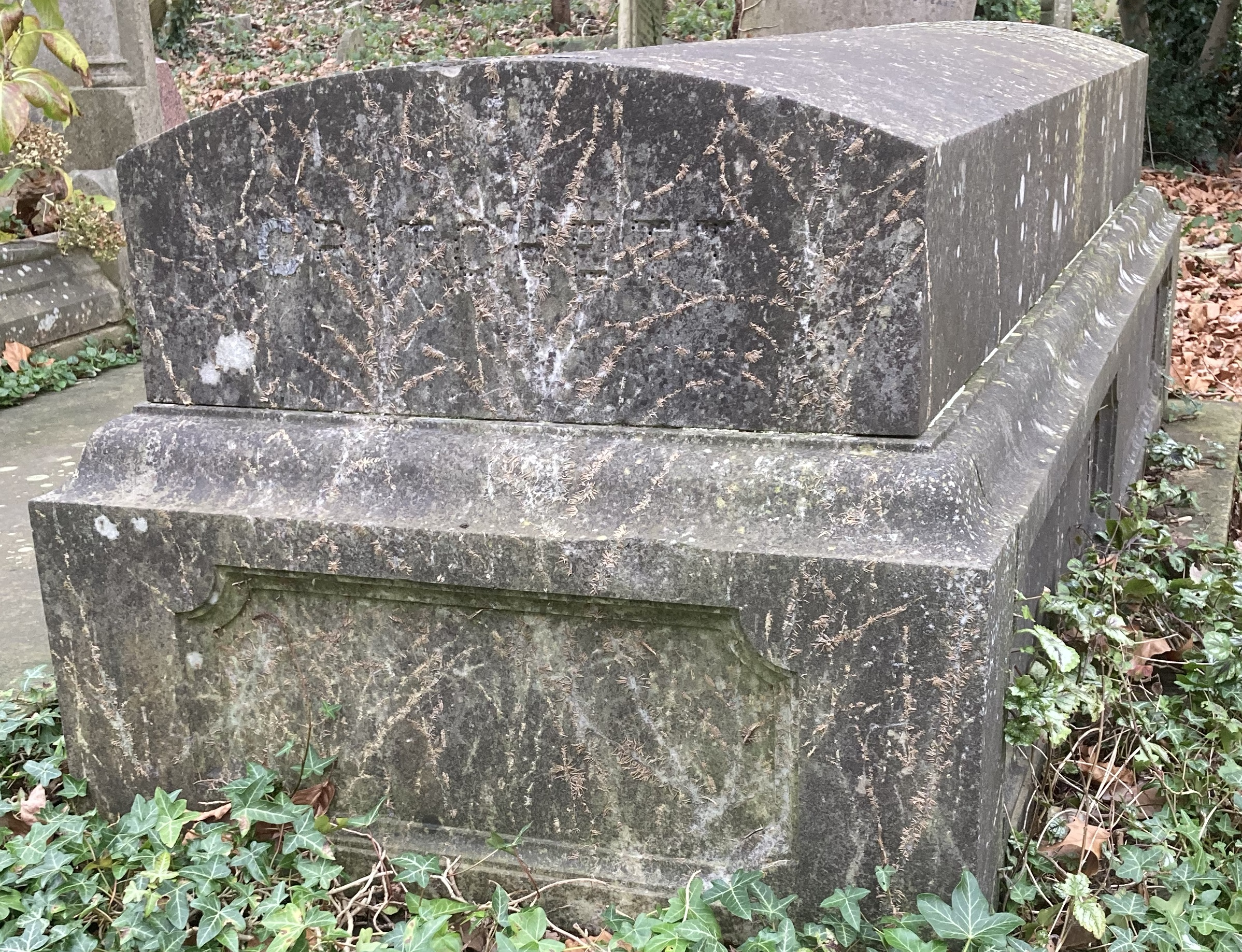
Grave of George Critchett in Highgate Cemetery

Critchett studied at the London Hospital. He became an M.R.C.S. in 1839 and a F.R.C.S. in 1844. He was a demonstrator of anatomy at and, from 1861–3, a surgeon to the London Hospital.

Critchett became a member of the council of the College of Surgeons in 1870 and served as an ophthalmic surgeon and lecturer at Middlesex Hospital from 1876–82.

He died on 1 November 1882 and was buried on the eastern side of Highgate Cemetery.
