= Critchett baronets =

Baronetcy in the Baronetage of the United Kingdom

- Creation date: 1908
- Status: Extant
- Motto: Suivez raison, Follow the right

The Critchett Baronetcy, of Harley Street in the Borough of St Marylebone, is a title in the Baronetage of the United Kingdom. It was created on 28 November 1908 for Sir Anderson Critchett. He was Surgeon-Oculist to Edward VII from 1901 to 1910 and to George V from 1910 to 1918 and Surgeon-Oculist-in-Ordinary to George V from 1918 to 1925. The third Baronet was a Counsellor at the Foreign and Commonwealth Office and an officer of the Secret Intelligence Service (MI6).

== Critchett baronets, of Harley Street (1908) ==
- Sir (George) Anderson Critchett, Kt., KCVO, 1st Baronet (1845–1925)
- Sir (George) Montague Critchett, MVO, 2nd Baronet (1884–1941)
- Sir Ian George Lorraine Critchett, 3rd Baronet (1920–2004)
- Sir Charles George Montague Critchett, 4th Baronet (born 1965)

The heir apparent is the present holder's son Ralph Henry Anderson Critchett (born 2006).

== Notes ==
Baronetage of the United Kingdom
| Preceded by Low baronets | Critchett baronets of Harley Street; 28 November 1908 | Succeeded by Roberts baronets |
