= Sir Anderson Critchett, 1st Baronet =

British surgeon

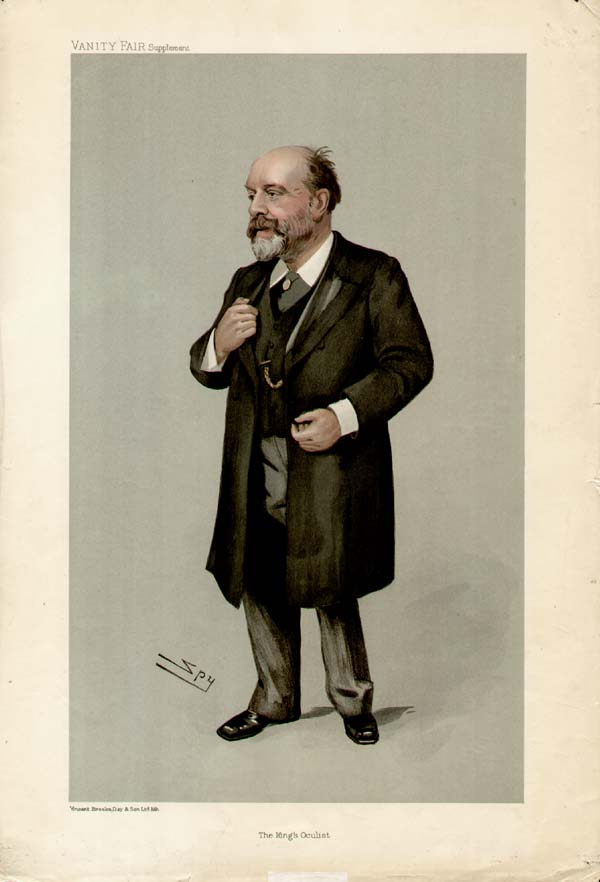
Sir Anderson Critchett, 1st Baronet

Sir George Anderson Critchett, 1st Baronet, KCVO, FRCSE (18 December 1845 – 9 February 1925) was a British surgeon. He was Surgeon-Oculist to Edward VII from 1901 to 1910 and to George V from 1910 to 1918 and Surgeon-Oculist-in-Ordinary to George V from 1918 to 1925.

Critchett was knighted in 1901, appointed CVO in 1905, and promoted KCVO in 1919. He was created a Baronet, of Harley Street in the Borough of St Marylebone in 1908.

His brother was the actor and playwright R. C. Carton.

== See also ==
- List of honorary medical staff at King Edward VII's Hospital for Officers
- Critchett baronets
