= List of extant baronetcies =

Existing baronetcies

Baronets are hereditary titles awarded by the Crown. The current baronetage of the United Kingdom has replaced the earlier, existing baronetages of England, Nova Scotia, Ireland and Great Britain.

To be recognised as a baronet, it is necessary to prove a claim of succession. When this has been done, the name is entered on the Official Roll of the Baronetage. Persons who have not proven their claims may not be officially styled as baronets. This was ordained by Royal Warrant in February 1910. A baronetcy is considered vacant if the previous holder has died within the previous five years and if no one has proven their succession, and is considered dormant if no one has proven their succession in more than five years after the death of the previous incumbent.

All extant baronetcies, including vacant baronetcies, are listed below in order of precedence (i.e. date). All other baronetcies, including those which are extinct, dormant or forfeit, are on a separate list of baronetcies. The list is current as of April 2026, when it was last updated. The baronetcy lists include any peerage titles which are held by the baronet.

Peerages and baronetcies of Britain and Ireland
Extant	All
Dukes	Dukedoms
Marquesses	Marquessates
Earls	Earldoms
Viscounts	Viscountcies
Barons	Baronies
Baronets	Baronetcies

== Baronetage of England (1611–1705) ==
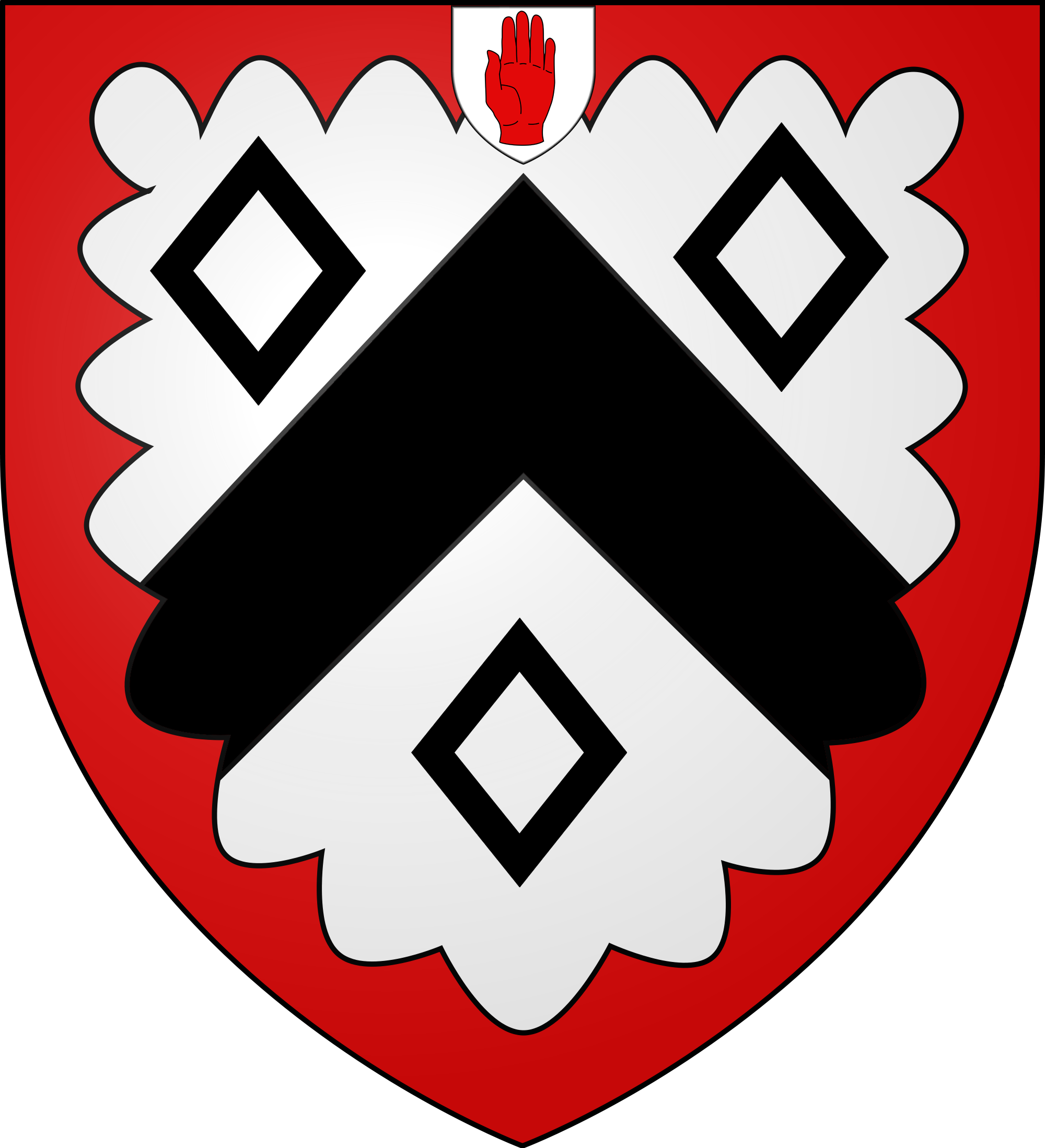
Coat of arms of the Martin baronets of Long Melford (1667) with the badge of a Baronet of England

King James I created the hereditary Order of Baronets in England on 22 May 1611, to fund the settlement of Ireland. He offered the dignity to 200 gentlemen of good birth, with a clear estate of £1,000 a year, on condition that each one should pay a sum equivalent to three years' pay to 30 soldiers at 8d. per day per man (total – £1,095) into the King's Exchequer.

The Baronetage of England comprises all baronetcies created in the Kingdom of England before the Act of Union in 1707. In that year, the Baronetage of England and the Baronetage of Nova Scotia were replaced by the Baronetage of Great Britain.

=== Baronets in the Baronetage of England ===
No	Title	Creation	Other titles and notes
1	Bacon of Redgrave	22 May 1611	Now also Bacon baronets of Mildenhall, since 1755
2	Shirley of Staunton	22 May 1611	Earl Ferrers
3	Pelham of Laughton	22 May 1611	Earl of Chichester
4	Hoghton, now de Hoghton of Hoghton Tower	22 May 1611	
5	Hobart-Hampden of Intwood	22 May 1611	Earl of Buckinghamshire
6	Gerard of Bryn	22 May 1611	Baron Gerard
8	Shelley of Michelgrove	22 May 1611	
9	Musgrave of Hartley Castle	29 June 1611	
10	Seymour of Berry Pomeroy	29 June 1611	Duke of Somerset
11	Finch of Eastwell	29 June 1611	Earl of Winchilsea and Nottingham
12	Monson of Carlton	29 June 1611	Baron Monson
13	Wodehouse of Wodehouse	29 June 1611	Earl of Kimberley
14	Harington of Ridlington	29 June 1611	
15	Brudenell of Deen	29 June 1611	Marquess of Ailesbury
16	Mordaunt of Massingham Parva	29 June 1611	Present baronet does not use the title.
17	Devereux of Castle Bromwich	25 November 1611	Viscount Hereford
18	Dormer of Wing	10 June 1615	Baron Dormer
19	Egerton, formerly Grey-Egerton, of Egerton	5 April 1617	
20	Townshend of Rainham	16 April 1617	Marquess Townshend
21	Lyttelton of Frankley	25 June 1618	Viscount Cobham
22	Hicks, now Hicks Beach of Beverston	21 July 1619	Earl St Aldwyn
23	Berney of Parkhall	5 May 1620	
24	Gower of Stittenham	2 June 1620	Duke of Sutherland
25	Philipps of Picton Castle	9 November 1621	Viscount St Davids
26	Wake of Clevedon	5 December 1621	
27	Hotham of Scorborough	4 January 1622	Baron Hotham
28	Mansel of Muddlescombe	14 January 1622	
29	Grosvenor of Eaton	23 February 1622	Duke of Westminster
30	Gage of Firle Place	26 March 1622	Viscount Gage
31	Cooper of Rockbourne	4 July 1622	Earl of Shaftesbury
32	Hazlerigg of Noseley	21 July 1622	Baron Hazlerigg
33	Skipwith of Prestwould	20 December 1622	
36	Isham of Lamport	30 May 1627	
38	Stanley of Bickerstaff	26 June 1627	Earl of Derby
39	Bacon of Mildenhall	29 July 1627	Now also Bacon baronets of Redgrave, since 1755
40	Stonhouse of Radley	7 May 1628	Also Stonhouse baronets of Radley (1670)
41	Wrey of Trebitch	13 June 1628	
42	Trelawny, now Salusbury-Trelawny of Trelawny	1 July 1628	
43	Wiseman of Canfield Hall	29 August 1628	
44	Nightingale of Newport Pond	1 September 1628	
45	Pole of Shute	12 September 1628	
46	Wolseley of Wolseley	24 November 1628	
47	Grimston of Little Waltham	2 March 1629	Earl of Verulam
49	Every of Eggington	26 May 1641	
50	Cave, now Cave-Browne-Cave of Stanford	30 June 1641	
51	Bampfylde of Poltimore	14 July 1641	Baron Poltimore
53	Northcote of Hayne	16 July 1641	Earl of Iddesleigh
54	Strickland, now Strickland-Constable of Boynton	30 July 1641	
55	Chichester of Raleigh	4 August 1641	
56	Knatchbull of Mersham Hatch	4 August 1641	Earl Mountbatten of Burma
57	Trollope of Casewick	5 February 1642	
58	Haggerston, now Constable Maxwell-Scott of Haggerston	15 August 1642	
60	Wrottesley of Wrottesley	30 August 1642	Baron Wrottesley
62	Waldegrave of Hever Castle	1 August 1643	Earl Waldegrave
64	Courtenay	February 1644	Earl of Devon
66	Acland of Columb John	21 January 1678	precedence of 24 June 1644
67	Boreel of Amsterdam	21 March 1645	
68	Bridgeman of Great Lever	3 December 1660	Earl of Bradford
69	Palmer of Carlton	7 June 1660	
70	Langham of Cottesbrooke	7 June 1660	
71	Finch of Raunston	7 June 1660	Earl of Winchilsea and Nottingham
72	Robinson of London	22 June 1660	
73	Astley of Hill Morton	25 June 1660	Baron Hastings
74	Bowyer of Denham Court	22 June 1660	Baron Denham; vacant since 2021.
75	Stanley of Alderley	25 June 1660	Baron Stanley of Alderley
76	Shuckburgh of Shuckburgh	25 June 1660	
78	St John of Woodford	28 June 1660	Baron St John of Bletso
79	Clerke of Hitcham	29 December 1660	
80	Boothby of Broadlow Ashe	13 July 1660	
81	Honywood of Evington	19 July 1660	
82	Smithson, now Percy of Stanwick	1660	Duke of Northumberland
83	Wheler of the City of Westminster	11 August 1660	
84	Rous of Henham	17 August 1660	Earl of Stradbroke
85	Onslow of West Clandon	1674	Earl of Onslow
87	Frankland of Thirkelby	24 December 1660	Baron Zouche
88	Legard of Ganton	29 December 1660	
89	Bedingfeld, now Paston-Bedingfeld of Oxburgh	2 January 1661	
90	Broughton of Broughton	10 March 1661	
91	Cayley of Brompton	26 April 1661	
92	Cooke of Wheatley	10 May 1661	
93	Ashburnham of Bromham	15 May 1661	
94	Jenkinson of Walcot and Hawkesbury	18 May 1661	
95	Williams-Bulkeley of Penrhyn	17 June 1661	
96	Carew of Haccombe	2 August 1661	
97	Bowyer-Smyth of Hill Hall	28 November 1661	
99	Osborn of Chicksands	11 February 1662	No heir.
100	Graham of Norton Conyers	17 November 1662	
101	Tancred, now Lawson-Tancred of Boroughbridge	17 November 1662	
102	Brooke of Norton	12 December 1662	
103	D'Oyly of Shottisham	29 July 1663	No heir.
104	Marsham of Cuckston	16 August 1663	Earl of Romney
105	Biddulph of Westcombe	2 November 1664	
106	Shaw, now Best-Shaw of Eltham	15 March 1665	
107	Jocelyn of Hyde Hall	8 June 1665	Earl of Roden
108	Burdett of Burthwaite	25 July 1665	
109	Hanham of Wimborne	24 May 1667	No heir.
110	Mostyn of Talacre	28 April 1670	
111	Stonhouse of Radley	5 May 1670	also Stonehouse baronets of Radley (1628)
112	Croft of Croft Castle	18 November 1671	
113	Eden of West Auckland	13 November 1672	also Baronet Eden of Maryland
114	Blackett of Newcastle	12 December 1673	
115	Hoskyns of Harewood	18 December 1676	
116	Hart Dyke of Horeham	3 March 1677	
117	Cotton of Combermere	29 March 1677	Viscount Combermere
118	Willoughby of Wollaton	7 April 1677	Baron Middleton
119	Cust of Stamford	29 September 1677	Baron Brownlow; vacant since 2021.
120	Bowyer, now Goring of Highden	18 May 1678	
122	Bunbury of Stanney Hall	29 June 1681	
123	Parker, now Hyde-Parker of Melford Hall	1 July 1681	Vacant since 2022.
124	Dashwood of Kirtlington	16 September 1684	
125	Blois of Grundisburgh	15 April 1686	
126	Williams-Wynn of Gray's Inn	6 July 1688	
127	Molesworth, now Molesworth-St Aubyn of Pencarrow	19 July 1689	
128	Ramsden of Byrom	30 November 1689	
129	Leighton of Wattlesborough	2 March 1693	No heir.
130	Colt of St James's-in-the-Fields	2 March 1694	No heir.
131	Thomas of Wenvoe	24 December 1694	No heir.
133	Chetwode of Oakley	6 April 1700	Baron Chetwode
134	Irby of Boston	13 April 1704	Baron Boston
135	Fleming of Rydal Hall	4 October 1705	
136	Miller of Chichester	29 October 1705	

== Baronetage of Nova Scotia (1625–1706) ==
Coat of arms of the Agnew baronets (1629) with riband and Badge of a Baronet of Nova Scotia.

The Baronetage of Nova Scotia was devised in 1624 as a means of settling the plantation of that province (now a province of Canada). King James VI of Scotland (who was also James I of England) announced his intention to create 100 baronets, each of whom was required to support six colonists for two years (or pay 2,000 merks in lieu thereof) and also to pay 1,000 merks to Sir William Alexander, to whom the province had been granted by charter in 1621.

James died before this scheme could be implemented, but it was carried out by his son Charles I, who created the first Scottish baronet on 28 May 1625, covenanting in the creation charter that the baronets of Scotland or of Nova Scotia should never exceed 150, that their heirs apparent should be knighted on coming of age (21), and that no one should receive the honour who had not fulfilled the conditions, viz, paid 3,000 merks (£166, 13s. 4d.) towards the plantation of the colony.

Four years later (17 November 1629) the King wrote to the contractors for baronets, recognising that they had advanced large sums to Sir William Alexander for the plantation on the security of the payments to be made by future baronets, and empowering them to offer a further inducement to applicants. On the same day he granted to all Nova Scotia baronets the right to wear about their necks, suspended on an orange tawny ribbon, a badge bearing an azure saltire with a crowned inescutcheon of the arms of Scotland and the motto Fax mentis honestae gloria (Glory is the torch that leads on the honourable mind). As the required number, however, had not been assembled by 1633, Charles then further announced that English and Irish gentlemen might also receive the honour, and in 1634 they began to do so. Yet even so, Charles was only able to create, in total, a few more than 120 baronets. In 1638 the creation ceased to carry with it the grant of lands in Nova Scotia, and on the union with England (1707) the Scottish creations ceased, English and Scotsmen alike receiving thenceforth Baronetcies of Great Britain.

=== Baronets in the Baronetage of Nova Scotia ===
No.	Title	Creation	Other titles
138	Innes, now Innes-Ker of Innes	28 May 1625	Duke of Roxburghe
139	Macdonald of Sleat	14 July 1625	Baron Macdonald, Chief of Clan Macdonald of Sleat
140	Colquhoun, now Grant of Grant	30 August 1625	Baron Strathspey
141	Graham of Braco	28 September 1625	Duke of Montrose
143	Johnston of Caskieben	31 March 1626	
145	Ogilvy of Inverquharity	29 September 1626	
146	Mackay of Far	28 March 1627	Baron Reay
147	Maxwell of Calderwood	28 March 1627	Baron Farnham
148	Stuart, now Crichton-Stuart of Bute	28 March 1627	Marquess of Bute; vacant since 2021.
149	Stewart of Corsewell	18 April 1627	Earl of Galloway; now also Stewart baronet, of Burray
150	Napier of Merchiston	2 May 1627	
151	Makgill of Cranston Riddell	19 July 1627	Viscount of Oxfuird
153	Acheson of Glencairny	1 January 1628	Earl of Gosford
154	Innes of Balvenie	15 January 1628	
155	Hope of Craighall	19 February 1628	
156	Riddell of Riddell	14 May 1628	
157	Murray of Blackbarony	15 May 1628	
158	Murray, now Erskine-Murray of Elibank	16 May 1628	Lord Elibank
159	Forbes of Castle Forbes	29 September 1628	Earl of Granard
160	Bruce of Stenhouse	29 September 1628	Vacant since 2021.
161	Stewart, later Stuart of Castle Stewart	2 October 1628	Earl Castle Stewart
162	Campbell of Auchinbreck	23 December 1628	
164	Agnew of Lochnaw	28 July 1629	
167	Richardson, now Stewart-Richardson of Pencaitland	13 November 1630	
168	Cuninghame, now Fairlie-Cuninghame of Robertland	25 November 1630	
170	Sinclair of Canisbay	2 June 1631	Earl of Caithness
171	Maclean of Morvaren (or Morvern)	3 September 1631	
172	Bingham of Castlebar	7 June 1634	Earl of Lucan
173	Munro of Foulis-Obsdale	7 June 1634	
174	Pilkington, now Milborne-Swinnerton-Pilkington of Stanley	29 June 1635	
175	Sinclair, now Sinclair-Lockhart of Murkle and Stevenston	18 June 1636	
177	Browne of The Neale	21 June 1636	Baron Kilmaine; the baronetcy is shown as "Vacant" on the Official Roll of the Baronetage*
178	Turing of Foveran	ca. 1638	
179	Gordon of Haddo	13 August 1642	Marquess of Aberdeen and Temair
180	Hamilton of Silverton Hill	1646	
181	Primrose of Carrington	1 August 1651	Earl of Rosebery
182	Carnegie of Pitarrow	20 February 1663	Duke of Fife
183	Seton of Abercorn	3 June 1663	
184	Maxwell of Orchardton	30 June 1663	
185	Dalrymple of Stair	2 June 1664	Earl of Stair
186	Dunbar, now Hope-Dunbar of Baldoon	13 October 1664	
187	Malcolm of Balbedie and Innertiel	25 July 1665	
188	Erskine, now St Clair-Erskine of Alva	30 April 1666	Earl of Rosslyn
189	Erskine of Cambo	20 August 1666	Earl of Kellie
190	Scott, now Napier of Thirlestane	22 August 1666	Lord Napier
191	Eliott of Stobs	3 December 1666	
192	Stewart, now Shaw-Stewart of Blackhall and Greenock	27 March 1667	
193	Don, now Don-Wauchope of Newton	7 June 1667	
194	Campbell of Aberuchill	16 March 1668	
195	Douglas of Kelhead	26 February 1668	Marquess of Queensberry
196	Barclay of Pierston	22 October 1668	
197	Home of Blackadder	25 January 1671	
199	Cuninghame, now Montgomery-Cuninghame of Corsehill	26 February 1672	
200	Jardine of Applegirth	25 May 1672	
212	Murray of Ochtertyre	3 June 1673	
214	Hamilton, now Stirling-Hamilton of Preston	5 November 1673	
223	Clerk of Penicuik	24 March 1679	
226	Maxwell of Monreith	8 January 1681	
231	Maxwell, now Stirling-Maxwell of Pollock	12 April 1682	Confirmed by patent of 27 March 1707
233	Bannerman of Elsick	28 December 1682	
234	Pringle of Stichell	5 January 1683	
240	Kirkpatrick of Closeburn	26 March 1685	
241	Dalyell of Binns	7 November 1685	
243	Broun of Colstoun	16 February 1686	
244	Innes of Coxton	20 March 1686	
247	Kinloch of Gilmerton	26 March 1685	
249	Hall of Dunglass	8 October 1687	
251	Grant of Dalvey	10 August 1688	
255	Lauder of Fountainhall	25 January 1690	
258	Dunbar of Mockrum	29 March 1694	
259	Anstruther of Balcaskie	28 November 1694	
261	Baird of Saughton Hall	28 February 1695	
263	Dunbar of Durn	29 January 1698	
264	Hope of Kirkliston	1 March 1698	Marquess of Linlithgow
265	Dalrymple of Killock	28 April 1698	Earl of Stair
265	Hamilton-Dalrymple of Bargeny	29 April 1698	
266	Anstruther of Anstruther	6 January 1700	
268	Dunbar of Northfield	10 April 1700	
269	Elliot of Minto	19 April 1700	Earl of Minto
270	Johnstone of Westerhall	25 April 1700	
271	Elphinstone of Logie	2 December 1701	
272	Cunynghame of Milncraig	3 February 1702	
273	Grant-Suttie of Balgone	5 May 1702	
274	Gibson-Craig-Carmichael of Keirhill	31 December 1702	
279	Fergusson of Kilkerran	30 November 1703	
	Nairne of Dunsinnan	31 March 1704	
282	Sinclair of Dunbeath	12 October 1704	
287	Grant of Monymusk	7 December 1705	
288	Gordon of Earlston	29 July 1706	
	Naesmyth of Dawyck and Posso	31 July 1706	
289	Dunbar of Hempriggs	21 December 1706	

== Baronetage of Ireland (1619–1800) ==
This is a list of extant baronetcies in the Baronetage of Ireland. They were first created in 1619, and were replaced by the Baronetage of the United Kingdom in 1801, after the Acts of Union 1800 came into force. The baronetcies are listed in order of precedence (i.e. date order).

No	Title	Date of creation	Other titles
26	Coote of Castle Cuffe	2 April 1621	
31	Aylmer of Donadea	25 January 1622	
32	Gore of Magherabegg	2 February 1622	
35	Lynch-Blosse of Galway	8 June 1622	
36	Tuite of Sonagh	16 June 1622	
41	Barnewall of Crickstown	21 February 1623	
42	Stewart of Ramalton	2 May 1623	
77	Butler of Cloughgrenan	16 August 1628	
86	Esmonde of Clonegall	28 January 1629	Vacant since 2021.
91	Osborne of Ballentaylor	15 October 1629	
157	Hamilton of Donalong	1660	Earl of Abercorn
173	Gore of Castle Gore	10 April 1662	Earl of Arran
179	Aylmer of Balrath	ca. 1662	Baron Aylmer.
194	Gethin of Gethinsgrott	1 August 1665	
221	Parsons of Birr Castle	15 December 1677	Earl of Rosse
248	O'Brien of Leaghmenagh	9 November 1686	Baron Inchiquin
252	Bellew of Barmeath	11 December 1688	Baron Bellew
266	Vesey of Abbey Leix	28 September 1698	Viscount de Vesci
278	Meade of Meadstown	29 May 1703	Earl Clanwilliam
283	Levinge of Knockdrin Castle	26 October 1704	
284	Maude of Dondrum	9 May 1705	Viscount Hawarden
303	Weldon of Dunmore	11 June 1723	
306	Paget of Plas Newydd	4 July 1730	Marquess of Anglesey
314	Colthurst of Ardrum	3 August 1744	
329	Crofton of the Mote	12 June 1758	Baron Crofton
333	Gore of Lissadill	30 August 1760	
338	Cotter of Rockforest	11 August 1763	
345	St George of Woodsgift	12 March 1766	
348	Freke of Castle Freke	15 July 1768	Baron Carbery
365	Langrishe of Knocktopher	19 February 1777	
375	Hill of Brook Hill	17 August 1779	
376	Waller of Newport	1 June 1780	
377	Loftus of Loftus Hall	18 December 1780	Marquess of Ely
383	Denny of Castle Moyle	12 January 1782	
386	Musgrave of Tourin	2 December 1782	
400	Hoare of Annabella	10 December 1784	
406	Richardson, now Richardson-Bunbury of Aughre	30 August 1787	
409	Hodson of Holybrook House	28 August 1789	
415	Lighton of Merville	1 March 1791	
435	Nugent of Ballinbough	23 July 1795	
442	Burke of Marble Hill	5 December 1797	
443	Mullins of Ventry	7 December 1797	Baron Ventry

== Baronetage of Great Britain (1707–1800) ==
The below is a list of all extant baronetcies in the Baronetage of Great Britain, which replaced the Baronetages of Nova Scotia and of England in 1707. In 1801 it was succeeded by the Baronetage of the United Kingdom. These baronetcies are listed in order of precedence, which is established by the date of the creation. For a complete list of baronetcies see List of baronetcies.

No	Title	Creation	Notes
290	Dashwood of West Wycombe	28 June 1707	
293	Lake of London	17 October 1711	
294	Desbouverie, now Pleydell-Bouverie of St Catherine Cree	19 February 1714	Earl of Radnor
295	Warrender of Lochend	2 June 1715	Baron Bruntisfield
296	Byng of Southill	15 November 1715	Viscount Torrington
297	Milner of Nun-Appleton Hall	26 February 1717	
298	Elton of Bristol	31 October 1717	
299	Blunt of London	17 June 1720	
300	Codrington of Dodington	21 April 1721	
302	Frederick of Burwood House	10 June 1723	
304	Hill, now Clegg-Hill of Hawkstone	20 January 1727	Viscount Hill
307	Clayton of Marden	13 January 1732	
308	Heathcote of London	17 January 1733	
309	Heathcote of Hursley	16 August 1733	
310	Dryden of Ambrosden	24 August 1733	Present holder also holds the Dryden baronetcy of Canons Ashby.
311	Armytage of Kirklees	4 July 1738	
312	Hulse of Lincoln's Inn Fields	7 February 1739	Vacant since 2022.
313	Wynn of Bodvean	25 October 1742	Baron Newborough
316	Beauchamp-Proctor, now Proctor-Beauchamp of Langley Park	20 February 1745	
318	Harbord-Hamond of Gunton	22 March 1746	Baron Suffield
319	Gooch of Benacre Hall	4 November 1746	
322	Gibbons of Stanwell Place	21 April 1752	
323	Winnington of Stanford Court	15 February 1755	
324	Sheffield of Normanby	1 March 1755	
325	Cavendish of Doveridge	7 May 1755	Baron Waterpark
326	Johnson of New York	27 November 1755	
327	Ridley of Blagdon	6 May 1756	Viscount Ridley
328	Smith, now Bromley of East Stoke	31 October 1757	
330	Wilmot of Chaddesden	15 February 1759	
331	Cunliffe of Liverpool	26 March 1759	
332	Glyn of Ewell	29 September 1759	
334	Hesketh, now Fermor-Hesketh of Rufford	5 May 1761	Baron Hesketh
335	Dundas of Kerse	16 November 1762	Marquess of Zetland
336	Blakiston of the City of London	22 April 1763	
341	Pigot of Patshull	5 December 1764	
342	Henniker-Major of Worlingworth Hall	15 July 1765	
343	Knowles of Lovell Hill	31 October 1765	
347	Hort of Castle Strange	8 September 1767	
349	Alleyne of Fourhills	6 April 1769	
350	Young of North Dean	2 May 1769	
351	Cocks of Dumbleton	7 October 1772	Baron Somers
352	St John, now St John-Mildmay of Farley	9 October 1772	Vacant since 2022.
353	Sutton of Norwood Park	14 October 1772	Vacant since 2021.
355	Hughes of East Bergholt	17 July 1773	
356	Edmonstone of Duntreath	20 May 1774	
357	Hanmer of Hanmer	21 May 1774	
358	ffolkes of Hillington	26 May 1774	No heir.
359	Burrell of Valentine House	31 May 1774	
360	Smith, now Smith-Marriott of Sydling St Nicholas	1 June 1774	
364	Mackworth of The Gnoll	16 September 1776	
365	Baker, now Baker Wilbraham of Loventor	19 September 1776	Vacant since 2022.
	Eden of Maryland	19 October 1776	Eden baronets, of West Auckland
366	Hood of Catherington	20 May 1778	Viscount Hood
367	Hawkins of Kelston	25 July 1778	
370	Lloyd-Mostyn of Pengwern	29 August 1778	Baron Mostyn
371	Coghill of Coghill	31 August 1778	No heir.
373	Rumbold of Wood Hall	27 March 1779	
379	Sykes of Basildon	8 June 1781	
380	Mosley of Ancoats	8 June 1781	
382	Middleton, now Noel of the Navy	23 October 1781	Earl of Gainsborough
384	Fletcher, now Aubrey-Fletcher of Clea Hall	20 May 1782	
387	Graham of Netherby	15 January 1783	
388	Sykes of Sledmere	20 March 1783	
389	Guise of Highnam Court	9 December 1783	Vacant since 2022.
390	Barrow, now Crawley-Boevey of Highgrove	22 January 1784	
391	Rycroft of Calton	22 January 1784	
392	Smith, now Smith-Dodsworth of Newland Park	22 January 1784	
393	Durrant of Scottow	22 January 1784	
394	Pepys of Upper Brook Street	22 January 1784	Earl of Cottenham
395	Wood of Barnsley	22 January 1784	Earl of Halifax
396	Fitzherbert of Tissington	22 January 1784	
397	Beevor of Hethel	22 January 1784	
401	Sinclair of Ulbster	14 February 1786	Viscount Thurso
402	Colquhoun of Luss	27 June 1786	
403	Rowley of Tendring Hall	27 June 1786	also Rowley baronets of Hill House
404	Hoare of Barn Elms	27 June 1786	
405	Hunter Blair of Dunskey	27 June 1786	
408	Miller of Glenlee	3 March 1788	
410	Buller, now Yarde-Buller of Lupton House	13 January 1790	Baron Churston
411	Oakeley of Shrewsbury	5 June 1790	
413	Malet of Wilbury	24 February 1791	
414	Kennaway of Hyderabad	25 February 1791	
416	Lushington of South Hill Park	26 April 1791	
417	James of Langley Hall	28 July 1791	Baron Northbourne
418	Pole of Wolverton	28 July 1791	
420	Palmer of Wanlip	28 July 1791	
422	Tollemache of Hanby Hall	12 January 1793	
423	Ford, now St Clair-Ford of Ember Court	22 February 1793	
424	Baring of the City of London	29 May 1793	Baron Northbrook
425	Pasley of Craig	1 September 1794	
	Dryden of Canons Ashby	2 May 1795	Current holder also holds the Dryden baronetcy of Ambrosden.
427	Darell of Richmond Hall	12 May 1795	
428	Neave of Dagnam Park	13 May 1795	
431	MacGregor of MacGregor of Lanwick	3 July 1795	
432	Holmes à Court of Heytesbury House	4 July 1795	Baron Heytesbury
433	Vanden-Bempde-Johnstone of Hackness Hall	6 July 1795	Baron Derwent
436	Farquhar of London	1 March 1796	
437	Pellew of Treverry	18 March 1796	Viscount Exmouth
438	Bellingham of Castle Bellingham	19 April 1796	
440	Baker, now Sherston-Baker of Dunstable House	14 May 1796	
441	Onslow of Althain	30 October 1797	
444	Dalrymple-Hay of Park	27 April 1798	
446	Fletcher, now Boughey of Newcastle-under-Lyme	24 August 1798	
448	Troubridge of Plymouth	30 November 1799	
	Glyn of Gaunt's House	22 November 1800	
449	Milman of Levaton-in-Woodland	28 November 1800	
450	Peel of Drayton Manor	29 November 1800	Earl Peel

== Baronetage of the United Kingdom (1801–present) ==
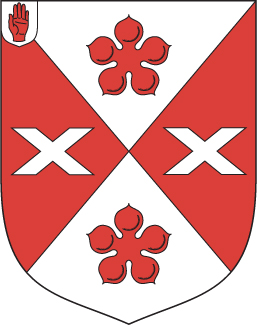
Coat of arms of the Agnew baronets (1895) with the badge of a Baronet of the United Kingdom.

The Baronetage of the United Kingdom started with the formation of the United Kingdom of Great Britain and Ireland in 1801, replacing the Baronetage of Great Britain. (For a complete list of baronetcies, see List of Baronetcies – which includes extinct baronetcies.)

The baronetcies are listed below in order of precedence (date order). (For ease in editing, the table has been divided into 25-year periods.)

The last baronet to be created was Sir Denis Thatcher in 1990.

=== 1801 ===
No	Title	Creation	Notes
451	de Saumarez of Guernsey	13 June 1801	Baron de Saumarez
453	Welby of Denton Manor	27 June 1801	
454	Baynes of Harefield Place	29 June 1801	
	Pepys of Wimpole Street	23 June 1801	Earl of Cottenham
456	Montgomery of Stanhope	16 July 1801	
457	Keane of Belmont	1 August 1801	
458	Hardinge of Fermanagh	4 August 1801	
460	Goold of Old Court, Cork	8 August 1801	
461	Crofton of Mohill	10 August 1801	
464	White of Tuxford and Wallingwells	20 December 1802	
465	Curtis of Cullands Grove	23 December 1802	
466	Stewart of Athenric	21 June 1803	
467	Stronge of Tynan	22 June 1803	No heir.
468	Barlow of Fort William	29 June 1803	
469	Wedderburn, now Ogilvy-Wedderburn of Balindean	10 August 1803	
471	Gordon-Cumming of Altyre near Forres	21 May 1804	
472	Sullivan of Thames Ditton	22 May 1804	
473	Smith, now Spencer-Smith of Tring Park	11 June 1804	
474	Lethbridge of Westaway House and Winkley Court	15 June 1804	
475	Bruce of Downhill	29 June 1804	
476	Lees of Black Rock	30 June 1804	
478	Hartwell of Dale Hall	26 October 1805	
479	Wigram of Walthamstowe House	30 October 1805	
480	Lopes of Maristow House	1 November 1805	Baron Roborough
481	Cotterell of Garnons	2 November 1805	
482	Muir Mackenzie of Delvine	9 November 1805	
483	Prevost of Belmont	6 December 1805	
484	Bromhead of Thurlby Hall	19 February 1806	
485	Sidney of Castle Goring	3 March 1806	Viscount De L'Isle
486	Cholmeley of Easton	4 March 1806	
487	Lubbock of Lammas	9 April 1806	Baron Avebury
490	Ramsay of Balmain	13 May 1806	
492	Thompson of Hartsbourne Manor	11 December 1806	
494	Blomefield of Attleborough	14 November 1807	
497	Sitwell of Renishaw	3 October 1808	
500	Baird of Newbyth	13 April 1809	
501	Seymour, now Culme-Seymour of Highmount	31 May 1809	
502	Roberts of Glassenbury and Brightfields Town	20 September 1809	
503	Blennerhassett of Blennerville	22 September 1809	
506	Stamer of the City of Dublin	15 December 1809	
509	Hobhouse of Chantry House	22 December 1812	
510	Lister-Kaye of Grange	28 December 1812	
513	Beckett of Leeds	2 November 1813	Baron Grimthorpe
514	Radcliffe of Milnesbridge House	2 November 1813	
516	Hewett of Nether Seal	6 November 1813	
517	Duff, now Duff-Gordon of Halkin	12 November 1813	
518	Young of Formosa Place	24 November 1813	Baron Young of Cookham (life peerage of the incumbent)
519	Wraxall of Wraxall	21 December 1813	
520	Fowke of Lowesby	7 February 1814	No heir.
521	Beresford, now Beresford-Peirse of Bagnall	21 May 1814	
522	Grey of Falloden	29 July 1814	
523	Blackwood of the Navy	1 September 1814	Baron Dufferin and Claneboye
524	Buchan-Hepburn of Smeaton-Hepburn	6 May 1815	Vacant since 2022.
526	Campbell of St Cross Mede, Hants	22 May 1815	
528	Antrobus of Antrobus	22 May 1815	
529	Preston of Beeston St Lawrence	30 May 1815	No heir.
530	Price of Trenwainton	30 May 1815	
531	King of Charlestown	21 July 1815	
533	Floyd	20 March 1816	
534	Elphinstone of Sowerby	25 May 1816	
535	McMahon	7 August 1817	
538	Farrington of Blackheath	2 December 1818	
539	Culvert, now Verney of Claydon House	3 December 1818	
540	Hervey-Bathurst of Lainston	7 December 1818	
541	Lechmere of The Rhydd	10 December 1818	
542	Lacon of Great Yarmouth	11 December 1818	
–	Sidney of Penshurst Place	12 December 1818	Viscount De L'Isle
543	Hare of Stow Hall	14 December 1818	
544	Stracey of Rackheath	15 December 1818	Vacant since 2022.
546	Croft of Cowling Hall	17 December 1818	No heir.
548	Mahon of Castlegar	14 April 1819	
549	Campbell, now Cockburn-Campbell of Gartsford	3 July 1821	
550	Fremantle of Swanbourne	14 August 1821	Baron Cottesloe
552	Shaw of Bushey Park	17 August 1821	
553	Jolliffe of Swanbourne	20 August 1821	Baron Hylton
554	Eardley-Wilmot of Berkswell Hall	23 August 1821	
555	Erskine of Cambo	27 August 1821	
556	Young of Baillieborough Castle	28 August 1821	
557	Cooper, now Astley-Cooper of Gadebridge	31 August 1821	
558	Brooke of Colebrooke	7 January 1822	Viscount Brookeborough
559	Arbuthnot of Edinburgh	3 March 1823	
560	Forbes of Newe	4 November 1823	No heir.
561	Baillie of Polkemmet	14 November 1823	

=== 1825 ===
No	Title	Creation	Notes
563	Munro of Lindertis	6 August 1825	
564	Vivian of Truro	19 January 1828	Baron Vivian
565	Vavasour of Haslewood	14 February 1828	
566	Ricketts of The Elms and Beaumont Leys	19 February 1828	
569	Slade of Maunsel House	30 September 1831	
570	Anson of Birch Hall	30 September 1831	
571	Campbell of Barcaldine and Glenure	30 September 1831	
572	McGrigor of Campden Hill	30 September 1831	
573	Jones, now Lawrence-Jones of Cranmer Hall	30 September 1831	
575	Wrixon-Becher of Ballygiblin	30 September 1831	
–	Gibson-Craig-Carmichael of Riccarton	30 September 1831	
578	Nugent of Donore	30 September 1831	
579	Heygate of Southend	30 September 1831	
580	Clarke of Dunham Lodge	30 September 1831	
581	Laurie of Bedford Square	15 March 1834	
582	Hammick of Cavendish Square	25 July 1834	
584	Forestier-Walker	28 March 1835	
585	Barrow of Ulverston	30 March 1835	
586	Rivett-Carnac of Derby	12 March 1836	
588	Newman of Stokeley and Mamhead	17 March 1836	
	Rowley of Hill House	21 March 1836	also Rowley Baronet of Tendring Hall
590	Macnaghten of Bushmills House	16 July 1836	
592	Houstoun, now Houstoun-Boswall	19 July 1836	
593	Wood, now Page Wood of Hatherley House	16 December 1837	
594	Head of Rochester	14 July 1838	
596	Lytton of Knebworth	18 July 1838	Earl of Lytton
597	Smith-Gordon	19 July 1838	
598	Boileau of Tacolnestone Hall	24 July 1838	
599	Shakerley of Somerset Hall	30 July 1838	
600	Seale of Mount Boone	31 July 1838	
601	Roche of Carass	8 August 1838	
602	Heywood of Claremont	9 August 1838	
603	Worsley of Hovingham	10 August 1838	
604	Stuart-Menteth of Closeburn	11 August 1838	
605	Guest of Dowlais	14 August 1838	Viscount Wimborne
606	Bellew, now Grattan-Bellew of Mount Bellew	15 August 1838	Vacant since 2022.
607	Crofton of Longford House	18 August 1838	
608	Spearman of Hanwell	28 April 1840	
609	Buxton of Belfield	30 July 1840	
610	Pelly of Upton	12 August 1840	
612	Couper	23 June 1841	
613	de Trafford of Trafford Park	7 September 1841	
614	Lawson, now Howard-Lawson of Brough Hall	8 September 1841	
615	Armstrong of Gallen	18 September 1841	
616	Clay of Fulwell Lodge	20 September 1841	
617	Le Marchant of Chobham Place	14 October 1841	
618	Parker of Shenstone Lodge	18 December 1844	
619	Pakington of Westwood	13 July 1846	Baron Hampton
620	Gladstone of Fasque and Balfour	18 July 1846	
621	Hogg of Upper Grosvenor Street	20 July 1846	also Baron Magheramorne; appears on the Official Roll of the Baronetage.
622	Feilden of Feniscowles	21 July 1846	
623	Ferguson Davie of Creedy	9 January 1847	
625	Rothschild of Grosvenor Place	12 January 1847	Baron Rothschild

=== 1850 ===
No	Title	Creation	Notes
632	Kay-Shuttleworth of Gawthorpe Hall	9 January 1850	Baron Shuttleworth
633	Tufton of Appleby Castle	16 January 1851	Baron Hothfield
634	Bailey of Glanusk Park	5 July 1852	Baron Glanusk
635	Bonham	27 November 1852	
636	Holland, now Holland-Hibbert of Sandlebridge	10 May 1853	Viscount Knutsford
638	Peto of Somerleyton Hall	22 February 1855	
639	Moon, now Graham-Moon of Portman Square	4 May 1855	
640	Walker of Oakley House	19 July 1856	
641	Jejeebhoy of Bombay	6 August 1857	
642	Havelock, now Havelock-Allan of Lucknow	22 January 1858	
643	Lawrence of Lucknow	10 August 1858	
644	Outram of Bengal	10 November 1858	
646	Stucley of Affeton Castle	26 April 1859	
647	Pauncefort-Duncombe of Great Brickhill Manor	25 May 1859	
648	Dilke of Sloane Street	22 January 1862	
649	Crossley of Belle Vue and Somerleyton	23 January 1863	Baron Somerleyton
650	Brown of Richmond Hill	24 January 1863	
651	Cooper of Woollahra	26 January 1863	
652	Manningham-Buller of Dilhorne Hall	20 January 1866	Viscount Dilhorne; vacant since 2022.
653	Watson of Henrietta Street	27 June 1866	
654	Ingilby of Ripley Castle	26 July 1866	
655	St Aubyn of St Michaels Mount	31 July 1866	Baron St Levan
656	Pollock of Hatton	2 August 1866	
657	Edwards of Pye Nest	3 August 1866	
658	Williams of Tregullow	4 August 1866	
659	Gooch of Clewer Park	15 November 1866	
660	Lampson of Rowfant	16 November 1866	Baron Killearn
661	Napier of Merrion Square	9 April 1867	
662	Bagge of Stradsett Hall	13 April 1867	
663	Guinness of Ashford	15 April 1867	
666	Walker of Sand Hutton and Beachampton	9 December 1868	
668	O'Connell of Lake View, Killarney and Ballybeggan	29 October 1869	
669	Salt of Saltaire and Crow Nest	3 October 1869	
670	Fairbairn of Ardwick	2 November 1869	
671	Earle of Allerton Tower	3 November 1869	
672	Jackson of Birkenhead	4 November 1869	
673	Bazley of Hatherop House	30 November 1869	
674	Paget of Harewood Place	28 August 1871	
675	Gull of Brook Street	8 February 1872	
676	Pollock, now Montagu-Pollock of The Khyber Pass	26 March 1872	
677	Rose of Montreal and Queen's Gate	9 September 1872	
678	Kinloch of Kinloch	16 April 1873	
679	Waterlow of London	4 August 1873	
680	Trevelyan of Wallington	13 March 1874	
681	Wilson of Eshton Hall	16 March 1874	
683	Heathcoat-Amory of Knightshayes Court	21 March 1874	
684	Green-Price of Norton Manor	23 March 1874	
685	Peek of Rousdon	13 May 1874	

=== 1875 ===
No	Title	Creation	Notes
691	Barttelot of Stopham	14 June 1875	
693	Greenall of Walton Hill	22 February 1876	Baron Daresbury
695	Codrington of Dodington	25 February 1876	
696	Temple of The Nash	16 August 1876	
697	Buchanan of Dunburgh	14 December 1878	
700	Allsopp of Hindlip Hall	7 May 1880	Baron Hindlip since 1886
701	Ripley of Rawdon and Bedstone	8 May 1880	
702	Bates of Bellefield, Gwyn Castle and Manydown	13 May 1880	
703	FitzGerald of Valencia	8 July 1880	Knight of Kerry
704	Phillimore of the Coppice	28 December 1881	Baron Phillimore
705	Vivian of Singleton	13 May 1882	Baron Swansea
706	Matheson of Lochalsh	15 May 1882	
707	Milbank of Well and Hart	16 May 1882	
708	Pease of Hutton Low Cross and Pinchinthorpe	18 May 1882	
710	Marling of Stanley Park and Sedbury Park	22 May 1882	
711	Clarke of Rupertswood	29 December 1882	
712	Jessel of Ladham House	25 May 1883	
714	Samuelson of Bodicote and Princes Gate	29 July 1884	
715	Guinness of Castle Knock	27 May 1885	Earl of Iveagh
716	Millais of Palace Gate and Saint Ouen, Jersey	16 July 1885	
717	Tennant of the Glen and St Rolux	17 July 1885	Baron Glenconner
718	Jardine, now Buchanan-Jardine of Castle Milk	20 July 1885	
719	Bell of Rounton Grange and Washington Hall	21 July 1885	
720	Brocklebank of Greenlands and Springwood	22 July 1885	
721	Morris of Spiddal	14 September 1885	Baron Killanin
722	Corry of Dunraven	15 September 1885	
723	Walker, now Walker-Okeover of Gateacre Grange and Osmaston Manor	12 February 1886	
724	Alexander, now Hagart-Alexander of Ballochmyle	13 February 1886	
725	Green of Wakefield and Ken Hill	5 March 1886	
726	Paget of Cranmore Hall	6 March 1886	
727	Orr-Ewing of Ballikinrain and Lennoxbank	8 March 1886	
728	Cook of Doughty House	10 March 1886	
730	Palmer of Grinkle Park and Newcastle upon Tyne	31 August 1886	
731	Clark of Edinburgh	28 September 1886	
732	Hanson of Bryanston Square	6 June 1887	
733	Houldsworth of Reddish and Coodham	20 July 1887	
734	Loder of Whittlebury and of High Beeches	27 July 1887	
735	Ewart of Glenmachen and of Glenbank	13 September 1887	
736	King of Campsie	10 October 1888	
737	Whitehead of Highfield House	26 November 1889	
738	Dillwyn-Llewellyn, now Dillwyn-Venables-Llewellyn of Penllergaer and Ynis-y-gerwn	20 March 1890	
739	Thompson of Park Gate	18 April 1890	
740	Acland of Oxford	16 June 1890	
741	Petit of Petit Hall, Bombay	1 September 1890	
742	Rawlinson	7 February 1891	
743	Brooks of Crawshaw Hall and Whatton House	9 February 1891	Baron Crawshaw
744	Durand of Ruckley Grange	8 April 1892	
745	Wiggin of Metchley Grange and Garth Gwynion	17 June 1892	
746	Lea of The Larches and Sea Grove	6 October 1892	
747	Jaffray of Skilts	8 October 1892	
748	Lawson of Hall Barn and Peterborough Court	13 October 1892	Baron Burnham
749	Holden of Oakworth House	1 July 1893	
750	Joicey of Longhirst and Ulgham	3 July 1893	
751	Ingram of Swineshead Abbey	9 August 1893	
752	Knill of The Grove	11 August 1893	
753	Gilbey of Elsenham Hall	4 September 1893	
754	Montagu of South Stoneham House and Kensington Palace Gardens	23 June 1894	Baron Swaythling
755	Pearson of Paddockhurst	26 June 1894	
756	Austin of Red Hill	16 July 1894	
757	Brunner of Druids Cross and Winnington Old Hall	27 July 1895	
758	Naylor-Leyland of Hyde Park House	31 August 1895	
759	Agnew of Great Stanhope Street	2 September 1895	
760	Renals of London	4 September 1895	
761	Arnott of Woodlands	12 February 1896	
762	Lewis of Nantgwyne	15 February 1896	Baron Merthyr
763	Boord of Wakehurst Place	18 February 1896	
764	Cave of Cleve Hill, Sidbury Manor and Stoneleigh House	21 July 1896	
765	Verdin of the Brocklehurst and Wimboldsley	24 July 1896	
766	Lees of South Lytchett Manor	13 February 1896	
767	Wills of Manor Heath	15 February 1897	Baron Dulverton
768	Powell of Wimpole Street	5 March 1897	
769	Baird (now Keith) of Urie	8 March 1897	Earl of Kintore
770	Reid of Ellon	28 August 1897	
771	Gamble of Windlehurst	31 August 1897	
772	Gilmour of Lundin and Montrave	1 September 1897	
773	Smith of Stratford Place	6 September 1897	
774	Quilter of Bawdsey Manor	13 September 1897	
775	Samuel of Nevern Square	8 March 1898	
776	Wigan of Clare Lawn & Purland Chase, Ross	9 March 1898	
777	Holder of Pitmaston	10 March 1898	
778	Maclure of The Home, Whalley Range	12 March 1898	
779	De La Rue of Cadogan Square	17 June 1898	
780	Rankin of Bryngwn	20 June 1898	
781	Tate of Park Hill	27 June 1898	
782	Barry of St Leonards Hill and of Keiss Castle	22 February 1899	
783	Salt of Standon and Weeping Cross	8 August 1899	
784	Usher of Norton and of Wells	29 August 1899	

=== 1900 ===
No	Title	Creation	Notes
800	Newton of The Wood	18 May 1900	
801	Chance of Grand Avenue, Hove	18 June 1900	
802	Chubb of Newlands	20 June 1900	Baron Hayter
803	Lawson of Weetwood Grange	12 July 1900	
804	Wrightson of Neasham Hall	13 July 1900	
806	Pile of Kenilworth House	24 September 1900	
807	McConnell of The Moat	25 September 1900	
808	Thomson, now Mitchell-Thomson of Polmond	26 September 1900	Baron Selsdon
809	Aird of Hyde Park Terrace	5 March 1901	
810	Backhouse of Uplands and the Rookery	6 March 1901	
811	Portal of Malshanger	11 March 1901	
812	Barlow of Wimpole Street	7 March 1902	
813	Porter, now Horsbrugh-Porter of Merrion Square	22 July 1902	
814	Bradford of South Audley Street	24 July 1902	
815	Noble of Ardmore and Ardardan Noble	25 July 1902	
816	Jackson of Stansted House	4 August 1902	
817	Henderson of Buscot Park	5 August 1902	Baron Faringdon
818	McLaren of Bodnant, Gwylgre & Hilders	8 August 1902	Baron Aberconway
820	Banbury of Warneford Place	6 January 1903	Baron Banbury of Southam
821	Renshaw of Coldharbour, Baronchan and Garvocks	7 January 1903	
823	Arthur of Carlung	10 January 1903	Baron Glenarthur
824	Nutting of St Helens, Booterstown	12 January 1903	
826	Hickman of Wightwick	25 August 1903	
827	Samuel of The Mote and Portland Place	26 August 1903	Viscount Bearsted
828	Cory-Wright of Caen Wood Towers and Horsey	28 August 1903	
829	Rasch of Woodhill	29 August 1903	
830	Dixon of Ballymenoch	7 October 1903	Baron Glentoran
831	Cochrane of Woodbrook, Lisgar Castle and Kildare Street	8 October 1903	
833	Brooke of Summerton	12 October 1903	
834	Smiley of Drumalis and Gallowhill	13 October 1903	
835	Wills of Hazelwood and Clapton-in Gordano	19 August 1904	
836	Ropner of Preston Hall and Skutterskelfe Hall	20 August 1904	
838	Kimber of Lansdown Lodge	24 August 1904	
839	White of Cotham House	26 August 1904	
841	Boyle of Ockham	14 December 1904	
842	Nairn of Rankeilour and Dysart House	16 December 1904	
844	Birkin of Ruddington Grange	25 July 1905	
846	Royden of Frankby Hall	29 July 1905	
847	Tritton of Bloomfield	1 August 1905	
848	Pound of Stanmore	3 August 1905	
850	Davis-Goff of Glenville	8 December 1905	
851	Morrison-Bell of Otterburn Hall	18 December 1905	
852	Cooper of Shenstone Court	20 December 1905	
854	Ley of Epperstone Manor	27 December 1905	
855	Mann of Thelveton Hall	29 December 1905	
856	Milburn of Guyzance	30 December 1905	
857	Walker of Pembroke House	12 July 1906	
858	Lawrence of Stone Gardens	13 July 1906	
860	Swann of Princes Gardens	16 July 1906	
861	Spicer of Lancaster Gate	17 July 1906	
862	Johnson-Ferguson of Springkell, Kenyon and Wiston	18 July 1906	
863	Greenwell of Marden Park and Grenwell	19 July 1906	
866	Wilson of Airdrie	27 July 1906	
867	Cawley of Prestwich	1 December 1906	Baron Cawley
868	Graham of Lambert House and Househill	4 December 1906	
869	Barlow of Bradwell Hall	20 July 1907	
870	Blake of Tilmouth Park	22 July 1907	
871	Dewar of the City of Perth	24 July 1907	Baron Forteviot
873	Scott of Beauclerc	27 July 1907	
874	Colman of Gatton Park	26 November 1907	
876	Jehangir of Bombay	16 July 1908	
878	Cheyne of Leagarth	20 July 1908	
879	Borthwick of Whitburgh	21 July 1908	
880	Kearley of Wittington	22 July 1908	Viscount Devonport
881	Roberts of Brynwenalt of Kilmaron	25 July 1908	Baron Clwyd
882	Robinson of Hawthornden and Dudley House	27 July 1908	
883	Warmington of Pembridge Square	28 July 1908	
884	Low, now Morrison-Low of Kilmaron	27 November 1908	
885	Critchett of Harley Street	28 November 1908	
886	Duckworth of Grosvenor Place	15 July 1909	
887	Rose of Hardwick House	19 July 1909	See also Rose baronets, of Montreal
888	Lakin of The Cliff	22 July 1909	
889	Scott of the Yews	27 July 1909	
891	Williamson of Glenogil	29 July 1909	Baron Forres
892	Crossley of Glenfield	26 November 1909	
893	Horsfall of Hayfield	27 November 1909	
894	Kleinwort of Bolnore	29 November 1909	
896	Fuller of Neston Park	7 July 1910	
898	Warner of Brettenham	9 July 1910	
899	Briscoe of Bourn Hall	12 July 1910	
900	Harmsworth of Horsey	14 July 1910	Viscount Rothermere
903	Tuck of Park Crescent	19 July 1910	
904	Ebrahim of Bombay	20 July 1910	
905	Baring of Nubia House	4 February 1911	
906	Graaff of Cape Town	6 February 1911	
911	Younger of Auchen Castle	14 February 1911	
912	Ward of Wellington	20 June 1911	Vacant since 2021.
913	Ball of Dublin	23 June 1911	
914	Redwood of Avenue Road	24 June 1911	
915	Bethell of Park House	26 June 1911	Baron Bethell
916	Coates, now Milnes Coates of Helperby Hall	29 June 1911	
917	Everard of Randlestown	3 June 1911	
918	Goodhart of Portland Place and Holtye	1 July 1911	
919	Haworth of Dunham Massey	3 July 1911	
920	Leon of Bletchley Park	5 July 1911	
922	Mander of The Mount	8 July 1911	
923	Markham of Beachborough Park	10 July 1911	
924	Younger of Leckie	12 July 1911	5th Viscount Younger of Leckie
925	Henniker-Heaton of Mundurrah	1 January 1912	
927	Neumann, now Newman of Cecil Lodge	6 February 1912	
928	Nicholson of Harrington Gardens	7 February 1912	
929	Ralli of Park Street	8 February 1912	
930	Skinner of Pont Street	9 February 1912	
931	Albu of Grosvenor Place and Johannesburg	12 February 1912	
932	Smith, now Hamilton-Smith of Colwyn Bay	9 July 1912	Baron Colwyn
933	Scott of Witley	3 February 1913	
934	Crisp of Bungay	5 February 1913	
935	Jackson of Eagle House	10 February 1913	
936	Denny of Dunbarton	16 June 1913	
937	Furness of Tunstall Grange	18 June 1913	
938	Vestey of Bessemer House	21 June 1913	Baron Vestey
939	Burnett of Selbourne House	17 October 1913	
940	McFarland of Aberfoyle	23 January 1914	
941	Vernon of Shotwick Park	24 January 1914	
942	Hobart of Langdon	14 July 1914	
943	Benn of the Old Knoll	15 July 1914	
944	Horlick of Cowley Manor	18 July 1914	
945	Maclay of Park Terrace	20 July 1914	Baron Maclay
946	Nivison of Sanguhar	21 July 1914	Baron Glendyne
947	Williams of Bridehead	9 February 1915	
948	Norman of Honeyhanger	22 June 1915	
949	Bowden of the City of Nottingham	23 June 1915	
950	Goschen of Beacon Lodge	17 January 1916	
951	Russell of Littleworth Corner	18 January 1916	
952	Jardine of Godalming	20 January 1916	
953	Booth of Allerton Beeches	24 January 1916	
955	Palmer of Grosvenor Crescent	26 January 1916	Baron Palmer
956	Yarrow of Homestead	29 January 1916	
957	Twisleton-Wykeham-Fiennes of Banbury	30 June 1916	
958	Borwick of Eden Lacy	1 July 1916	Baron Borwick
959	Aitken of New Brunswick	3 July 1916	Baron Beaverbrook
960	Devitt of Chelsea	4 July 1916	
961	du Cros of Canons	5 July 1916	
962	Dunlop of Woodbourne	6 July 1916	
963	Moir of Whitehanger	11 July 1916	
964	Hill of Bradford	13 January 1917	
965	Adam of Hankelow Court	15 February 1917	
966	Dewey of South Hill Wood	20 February 1917	
967	Elliott of Limpsfield	21 June 1917	
968	Magnus of Tangley Hill	22 June 1917	
969	Imbert-Terry of Strete Ralegh	2 July 1917	
970	Clark of Dunlambert	6 July 1917	
971	Gray of Tunstall Manor	7 July 1917	
972	Vassar-Smith of Charlton Park	10 July 1917	
973	Taylor, now Stuart Taylor of Kennington	11 July 1917	
974	Remnant of Wenhaston	14 July 1917	Baron Remnant
975	Stanier of Peplow Hall	16 July 1917	
976	Lowe of Edgbaston	30 January 1918	
977	Huntington-Whiteley of Grimley	8 February 1918	
978	Leigh of Altrincham	9 February 1918	
979	Stewart-Clark of Dundas	12 February 1918	
980	Petrie of Carrowcarden	20 June 1918	
981	Rhys-Williams of Miskin	25 June 1918	
982	McAlpine of Knott Park	2 July 1918	
983	Hanson of Fowey	6 July 1918	
984	Bailey of Cradock	12 February 1919	
985	Chadwyck-Healey of Wyphurst and New Place	6 May 1919	
986	Thomas of Ynyshir	10 May 1919	
987	Marr of Sunderland	12 May 1919	
988	Cory of Coryton	13 May 1919	
989	Dixon of Astle	15 May 1919	
990	Garthwaite of Durham	19 May 1919	
991	Greenway of Stanbridge Earls	20 May 1919	Baron Greenway
992	Jones of Treeton	23 May 1919	
993	Moore of Hancox	28 May 1919	
994	Rhodes of Hollingworth	29 May 1919	
995	Blaker of Brighton	5 September 1919	
996	Ryan of Hintlesham	8 September 1919	
997	Roberts of Eccleshall and Queens Tower	9 September 1919	
998	Brooke of Almondbury	13 September 1919	
999	Brooksbank of Healaugh Manor	15 September 1919	
1000	Child of Bromley Palace	16 September 1919	
1001	Hall of Burton Park	18 September 1919	
1002	Holden of The Firs	19 September 1919	
1003	Joynson-Hicks of Holmbury	20 September 1919	Also Joynson-Hicks of Newick (1956); Viscount Brentford
1004	Philipps of Llanstephan	22 September 1919	Baron Milford
1005	Robertson of Welbourne	4 October 1919	Baron Robertson of Oakridge
1006	Madden of Kells	7 October 1919	
1007	Trenchard of Wolfeton	9 October 1919	Viscount Trenchard
1008	Tyrwhitt of Terschelling and Oxford	13 December 1919	
1009	Cassel of Lincoln's Inn	26 January 1920	
1010	Robinson, now Lynch-Robinson of Foxrock	30 January 1920	
1011	Cunliffe-Owen of Bray	2 February 1920	
1012	Dawson of Edgewarebury	5 February 1920	
1013	Wheeler of Woodhouse Eaves	7 February 1920	
1014	Wilson of Carbeth	11 February 1920	
1015	Holderness of Tadworth	16 February 1920	
1016	North of Southwell	1 March 1920	
1017	Aykroyd of Lightcliffe	16 June 1920	
1018	Frank of Withyham	19 June 1920	
1019	Halsey of Gaddesden	22 June 1920	
1020	Pease of Hummersknott	25 June 1920	Vacant since 2021.
1021	Sanderson of Malling Deanery	26 June 1920	
1022	Sharp of Heckmondwike	28 June 1920	
1023	Sleight of Weelsby Hall	29 June 1920	
1024	Smith, now Reardon Smith of Appledore	1 July 1920	
1025	Stott of Stanton	3 July 1920	
1026	Touche of Westcott	5 July 1920	
1027	Lucas-Tooth of Bught	1 December 1920	
1028	Stewart of Balgownie	10 December 1920	
1029	Bowen of Colworth	10 January 1921	
1030	Holcroft of Eaton Mascott	12 January 1921	
1031	Hewitt of Barnsley	15 January 1921	
1032	Mills of Ebbw Vale	21 January 1921	Vacant since 2021.
1033	Hill-Wood of Moorfield	25 January 1921	
1034	Burney of Preston House	27 January 1921	
1035	Birkmyre of Dalmunzie	29 January 1921	
1036	Sutherland of Dunstanburgh Castle	16 June 1921	
1037	Sykes of Kingsknowes	17 June 1921	
1038	Renwick of Newminster Abbey	22 June 1921	
1039	Lacy of Ampton	23 June 1921	
1040	Vestey of Shirley	27 June 1921	
1041	Beckett of Kirkdale Manor	28 June 1921	
1042	Cain, now Nall-Cain of the Node	1 July 1921	Baron Brocket
1043	Alexander of Edgehill, Stamford, Connecticut	2 July 1921	
1044	Berry of Long Cross	4 July 1921	Viscount Camrose
1045	Catto of Peterhead	5 July 1921	Baron Catto
1046	Esplen of Hardres Court	14 July 1921	
1047	Coates of Haypark	15 July 1921	
1048	Grayson of Ravenspoint	12 January 1922	
1049	Goodson of Waddeton Court	18 January 1922	
1050	Aske of Aughton	21 January 1922	
1051	Mountain of Oare Manor and Brendon	23 January 1922	
1052	Bird of Solihull	27 January 1922	
1053	Butler of Old Park, Devizes	28 January 1922	
1054	Llewellyn of Bwllfa	31 January 1922	
1055	Norton-Griffiths of Wonham	14 June 1922	
1056	Harrison of Eaglescliffe	15 June 1922	
1057	Boles of Bishop's Lydeard	17 June 1922	
1058	Harmsworth of Freshwater Grove	21 June 1922	
1059	Nuttall of Chasefield	22 June 1922	
1060	Sharp of Warden Court	23 June 1922	
1061	Moynihan of Carr Manor	26 June 1922	
1062	White of Salle Park	29 June 1922	
1063	Baddeley of Lakefield	24 November 1922	
1065	Pollock of Hanworth	27 November 1922	Viscount Hanworth
1066	Baden-Powell of Bentley	4 December 1922	Baron Baden-Powell
1067	Macready of Cheltenham	1 March 1923	
1068	Hall of Grafham	5 March 1923	
1069	Reynolds of Woolton	6 March 1923	
1070	Burn, now Forbes-Leith of Fyvie of Jessfield	7 March 1923	
1071	Kaye of Huddersfield	8 March 1923	
1072	Bowlby of Manchester Square	17 July 1923	
1073	Wills of Blagdon	19 July 1923	
1074	Dorman of Nunthorpe	21 July 1923	
1075	Raeburn of Helensburgh	25 July 1923	
1076	Noble of Ardkinglas	25 July 1923	
1077	Richardson of Yellow Woods	26 January 1924	
1078	Cayzer of Tylney	29 January 1924	Baron Rotherwick
1079	Power of Newlands Manor	1 February 1924	
1080	Hambling of Oxford	27 February 1924	
1081	MacLeod of Fuinary, Morven	3 March 1924	
1082	Newton of Beckenham	27 October 1924	

=== 1925 ===
No	Title	Creation	Notes
1122	Molony of Dublin	21 July 1925	
1123	MacLeod of The Fairfields	22 January 1925	
1124	Bonsor of Kingswood	26 January 1925	
1125	Hughes-Morgan of Penally	27 June 1925	
1126	Lithgow of Ormsary	1 July 1925	
1127	Thomson of Old Nunthorpe	3 July 1925	
1130	Gilmour of Liberton and Craigmillar	29 July 1926	
1131	Pryke of Wanstead	3 November 1926	
1132	Davson of Berbice	21 January 1927	
1133	Hennessy of Winchester	24 January 1927	Baron Windlesham
1135	Peto of Barnstaple	27 January 1927	
1136	Renwick of Coombe	28 June 1927	Baron Renwick
1138	Berry of Farnham Royal	25 January 1928	Viscount Kemsley
1140	Batho of Frinton	19 October 1928	
1142	Aykroyd of Birstwirth Hall	23 March 1929	
1143	Horne of Shackleford	25 March 1929	
1144	Lyle of Glendelvine	26 March 1929	
1145	Thomson of Glendarroch	28 March 1929	
1146	O'Neill of Cleggan	17 June 1929	Baron Rathcavan
1147	Rigby of Long Durford	24 June 1929	
1148	Buzzard of Munstead Grange	25 June 1929	
1150	Pilditch of Bartropps	28 June 1929	
1151	Anstruther-Gough-Calthorpe of Elvetham Hall	1 July 1929	
1154	Ford of Westerdunes	27 July 1929	
1155	Bennett of Kirklington	31 July 1929	
1156	Studd of Netheravon	16 October 1929	
1157	Tennyson-d'Eyncourt of Carter's Corner Farm	3 February 1930	
1158	Foster of Bloomsbury	5 February 1930	
1159	Mott of Ditchling	25 June 1930	
1160	Waterlow of Harrow Weald	28 October 1930	
1161	Harris of Bethnall Green	14 January 1932	
1162	Samuel, now Mancroft of Mancroft	15 January 1932	Baron Mancroft
1163	Moore of Moore Lodge	20 June 1932	
1164	Jenks of Cheape	8 October 1932	
1165	Harvey of Threadneedle Street	19 January 1933	
1166	Spencer-Nairn of Monimail	20 January 1933	
1167	Bowyer of Weston Underwood	21 January 1933	Baron Denham
1168	Macpherson of Drumalban	26 April 1933	Baron Strathcarron
1169	Penny of Singapore and Kingston upon Thames	19 June 1933	Viscount Marchwood
1170	Greenaway of Coombe	23 October 1933	
1171	McLintock of Sanquhar	19 January 1934	
1172	Cahn of Stanford-upon-Stour	27 June 1934	
1173	Grotrian of Leighton Buzzard	28 June 1934	
1174	Harford of Falcondale	29 June 1934	
1175	Collett of Bridge Ward	1 November 1934	
1176	Mackintosh of Halifax	28 January 1935	Viscount Mackintosh of Halifax
1177	Waring of St Bartholomew's	29 January 1935	
1178	Ruggles-Brise of Spains Hall	31 January 1935	
1179	Burton-Chadwick of Bidston	3 July 1935	
1180	Mallinson of Walthamstow	6 July 1935	
1182	Starkey of Norwood Park	9 July 1935	
1183	Guthrie of Brent Eleigh Hall	6 February 1936	
1184	Whitaker of Babworth	15 July 1936	
1185	Dugdale of Merevale and Blyth	17 July 1936	
1186	Vincent of Watton	18 January 1937	
1187	Lees of Longendale	2 March 1937	
1188	Bates of Magherabuoy	7 June 1937	
1189	Milne-Watson of Ashley	11 June 1937	
1190	Southby of Burford	12 June 1937	
1191	Broadbridge of Wargrave Place	22 November 1937	Baron Broadbridge
1992	Aitchison of Lemmington	31 January 1938	
1993	Gunston of Wickwar	1 February 1938	
1994	Mactaggart of King's Park	2 February 1938	
1995	Pinsent of Selly Hill	3 February 1938	
1996	Hacking of Altham	27 June 1938	Baron Hacking
1997	Prescott of Godmanchester	30 June 1938	
1998	Strang-Steel of Philiphaugh	2 July 1938	
1999	Colfox of Symondsbury	4 July 1939	
1200	Hutchison of Thurle	6 July 1939	
1201	Oakes of Nassau	27 July 1939	
1202	Bowater of Friston	11 October 1939	
1203	Wilkinson of Brook	8 December 1941	
1204	Wedgwood of Etruria	20 January 1942	
1205	Shakespeare of Lakenham	11 July 1942	
1206	Eve of Silsoe	18 January 1943	Baron Silsoe
1207	Goodenough of Broadwell and Filkins	19 January 1943	
1209	Boulton of Braxted Park	30 June 1944	
1210	Newson-Smith of Totteridge	1 December 1944	
1211	Dugdale of Crathorne	31 January 1945	Baron Crathorne
1212	Bruce-Gardner of Frilford	12 February 1945	
1213	Smith of Crowmallie	21 June 1945	
1214	Erskine-Hill of Quothquhan	22 June 1945	
1215	Mulholland of Ballyscullion Park	3 July 1945	
1216	Womersley of Grimsby	3 September 1945	
1217	Assheton of Downham	4 September 1945	Baron Clitheroe
1218	Harvie-Watt of Bathgate	5 September 1945	
1219	Young of Partick	7 September 1945	
1220	Alexander of Sundridge Park	19 November 1945	
1222	Smith of Keighley	28 November 1947	

=== 1950 ===
No	Title	Creation	Notes
1223	Lowson of Westlaws	27 June 1951	
1224	Proby of Elton Hall	30 January 1952	
1225	Grimston of Westbury	11 March 1952	Baron Grimston of Westbury
1226	Seager of St Mellons	1 July 1952	Baron Leighton of St Mellons
1227	Boyce of Badgeworth	24 November 1952	
1228	McEwen of Marchmont and Bardrochat	28 January 1953	
1229	Mills of Alcester	1 July 1953	Viscount Mills
1230	Williams of Cilgeraint	3 July 1953	
1231	Bossom of Maidstone	4 July 1953	
1232	Nall of Hoveringham	25 January 1954	
1233	Bernard of Snakemoor	27 January 1954	
1234	Mackeson of Hythe	29 January 1954	
1235	Whitmore of Orsett	28 June 1954	
1236	Brain of Reading	29 June 1954	Baron Brain
1237	Conant of Lyndon	30 June 1954	
1238	Nelson of Hilcote Hall	11 July 1955	Baron Nelson of Stafford
1239	Howard of Great Rissington	1 December 1955	
1240	Smyth of Teignmouth	23 January 1956	
1241	Hutchison of Rossie	26 January 1956	Vacant since 2019.
1242	Ponsonby of Wootton	27 January 1956	
1243	Studholme of Perridge	3 July 1956	
1244	Ackroyd of Dewsbury	8 May 1956	
1245	Agnew, now Agnew-Somerville of Clendry	31 January 1957	
1246	Henderson-Stewart of Cullumshill	28 March 1957	
1247	Willink of Dingle Bank	20 July 1957	
1248	Maclean of Strachur and Glensluain	22 July 1957	
1249	Welch of Chard	16 December 1957	
1250	Chapman of Cleadon	30 January 1958	
1251	Dunnington-Jefferson of Thorganby Hall	7 July 1958	
1252	Evans-Bevan of Cadoxton-juxta-Neath	9 July 1958	
1253	Pickthorn of Orford	31 January 1959	
1254	Bibby of Tarporley	8 July 1959	
1255	Oakshott of Bebington	10 July 1959	
1256	Platt of Grindleford	14 September 1959	
1257	Gillett of Bassishaw Ward, City of London	4 December 1959	
1258	Ross of Whetstone	26 January 1960	
1259	Kaberry of Adel cum Eccup	28 January 1960	Baron Kaberry of Adel (Life Peerage of 1st Bt)
1260	Storey of Settrington	30 January 1960	
1261	Lloyd of Rhu	23 July 1960	Vacant since 2022.
1262	Barber of Greasley	25 July 1960	
1263	Walker-Smith of Broxbourne	18 August 1960	
1264	Stockdale of Hoddington	5 December 1960	
1265	Harrison of Bugbrooke	6 July 1961	
1266	Waley-Cohen of Honeymead	11 December 1961	
1267	Jephcott of East Portlemouth	14 February 1962	
1268	Scott of Rotherfield	16 February 1962	
1269	Lindsay of Dowhill	27 February 1962	
1270	Wakefield of Kendal	10 March 1962	
1271	Porritt of Hampstead	25 January 1963	
1272	Thompson of Reculver	28 January 1963	
1273	Thompson of Walton-on-the-Hill	29 January 1963	
1274	Errington of Ness	26 June 1963	
1275	Orr-Ewing of Hendon	27 June 1963	
1277	Mynors of Treago	24 January 1964	No heir.
1278	Arbuthnot of Kittybrewster	26 February 1964	Vacant since 2021.
1279	Rodgers of Groombridge	29 June 1964	
1280	Dudley-Williams of Exeter	2 July 1964	
1281	Redmayne of Rushcliffe	29 December 1964	
1282	Pearson of Gressingham	30 December 1964	No heir.
1283	Finlay of Epping	31 December 1964	No heir.

=== 1975 ===
No	Title	Creation	Notes
1284	Thatcher of Scotney	7 December 1990	

== See also ==
- List of baronetcies
- List of baronetcies in the Baronetage of the United Kingdom
