= List of baronetcies in the Baronetage of the United Kingdom =

Peerages and baronetcies of Britain and Ireland
Extant	All
Dukes	Dukedoms
Marquesses	Marquessates
Earls	Earldoms
Viscounts	Viscountcies
Barons	Baronies
Baronets	Baronetcies
En, Ire, NS, GB, UK (extinct)

This is a list of baronetcies in the Baronetage of the United Kingdom. They have been created since 1801, when they replaced the baronetages of Baronetage of Great Britain and Baronetage of Ireland. This list is not currently complete.

Index: A |B |C |D |E |F |G |H |I |J |K |L |M |N |O |P–Q |R |S |T |U–V |W–Z |See also

== A ==
Title	Date of creation	Surname	Current status	Notes
Abdy of Albyns	1849	Abdy	extant	
Abel of Whitehall Court	1893	Abel	extinct 1902	
Ackroyd of Dewsbury	1956	Ackroyd	extant	Lord Mayor of London
Acland of Oxford	1890	Acland	extant	
Adair of Flixton Hall	1838	Adair	extinct 1988	
Adam of Blair	1882	Blair	extinct 1922	
Adam of Hankelow	1917	Adam	extant	
Agnew of Clendry	1957	Agnew	extant	
Agnew of The Planche	1895	Agnew	extant	
Ainsley of Great Torrington	1804	Ainsley	extinct 1858	
Ainsworth of Ardanaiseig	1917	Ainsworth	extant	
Aird of London	1901	Aird	extant	
Aitchison of Lemmington	1938	Aitchison	extant	
Aitken of Chirkley	1916	Aitken	extant	first Baronet created Baron Beaverbrook in 1917
Albu of Johannesburg	1912	Albu	extant	
Alexander of Ballochmyle	1886	Alexander, Hagart-Alexander	extant	
Alexander, later Cable-Alexander of Belcamp	1809	Alexander, Cable-Alexander	dormant	seventh Baronet died 1988
Alexander of Edgehill	1921	Alexander	extant	
Alexander of Sundridge Park	1945	Alexander	extant	Lord Mayor of London
Alison of Possil House	1852	Alison	extinct 1970	
Allan of Kinsgate	1819	Allan	extinct 1820	
Allen of Marlow	1933	Allen	extinct 1939	
Allsopp of Alsop-le-Dale	1880	Allsopp	extant	first Baronet created Baron Hindlip in 1880
Anderson of Ardtaraig	1919	Anderson	extinct 1942	
Anderson of Fermoy	1813	Anderson	extinct 1861	
Anderson of Harrold Priory	1920	Anderson	extinct 1963	
Anderson of Mullaghmore House	1911	Anderson	extinct 1921	Lord Mayor of Belfast
Andrews of Comber	1942	Andrews	extinct 1951	
Anson of Hatch Beauchamp	1831	Anson	extant	
Anstruther-Gough-Calthorpe of Elveham	1929	Anstruther-Gough-Calthorpe	extant	
Anstruther-Gray of Kilmany	1956	Anstruther-Gray	extinct 1985	first Baronet created a life peer as Baron Kilmany in 1966
Antrobus of Antrobus Hall	1815	Antrobus	extant	
Arbuthnot of Edinburgh	1823	Arbuthnot	extant	Lord Provost of Edinburgh
Arbuthnot of Kittybrewster	1964	Arbuthnot	extant	
Archdale of Riversdale	1928	Archdale	extant	
Armstrong of Ashburn Place	1892	Armstrong	extinct 1944	
Armstrong of Gallen Priory	1841	Armstrong	extant	
Arnott of Baily	1896	Arnott	extant	
Arthur of Carlung	1903	Arthur	extant	first Baronet created Baron Glenarthur in 1918
Arthur of Upper Canada	1841	Arthur	extant	
Ashman of Thirmlere	1907	Ashman	extinct 1916	
Aske of Aughton	1922	Aske	extant	
Assheton of Downham	1945	Assheton	extant	second Baronet had been created Baron Clitheroe in 1955 prior to succeeding to the baronetcy
Astley of Everley	1821	Astley	extinct 1994	
Astley-Cooper of Gadebridge	1821	Astley-Cooper	extant	
Austin of Red Hill	1894	Austin	extant	
Avery of Oakley	1905	Avery	extinct 1918	
Aykroyd of Bristwith Hall	1929	Aykroyd	extant	
Aykroyd of Lightcliffe	1920	Aykroyd	extant	
Aylwen of St Bartholomews	1949	Aylwen	extinct 1967	Lord Mayor of London

== B ==
Title	Date of creation	Surname	Current status	Notes
Backhouse of Uplands	1901	Backhouse	extant	
Baddeley of Lakefield	1922	Baddeley	extant	Lord Mayor of London
Baden-Powell of Bentley	1922	Baden-Powell	extant	first Baronet created Baron Baden-Powell in 1929
Bagge of Stradsett Hall	1867	Bagge	extant	
Bagot of Levens Hall	1913	Bagot	extinct 1920	
Bailey of Glanusk Park	1852	Bailey	extant	first Baronet created Baron Glanusk in 1889
Bailey of South Africa	1919	Bailey	extant	
Baillie of Berkeley Square	1819	Baillie, Mackenzie	extinct 1853	first Baronet had already been created a Baronet in 1812, which title became extinct in 1820
Baillie of Polkemmet	1823	Baillie	extant	
Baillie of Portman Square	1812	Baillie	extinct 1820	first Baronet obtained a new patent in 1819, which creation became extinct in 1853
Baird of Newbyth	1809	Baird	extant	
Baird of Stonehaven (now Keith)	1897	Baird	extant	second Baronet created Viscount Stonehaven in 1938; the second Viscount succeeded as Earl of Kintore in 1974.
Baker of Ranston	1802	Baker	extinct 1959	
Balfour of Albury Lodge	1911	Balfour	extinct 1929	
Balfour of Sheffield	1929	Balfour	extant	first Baronet created Baron Riverdale in 1935; baronetcy unproven (2nd baronet died 1998) – under review
Ball of Blofield	1801	Ball	extinct 1874	
Ball of Merrion Square and Killybegs	1911	Ball	extant	
Banbury of Warneford Place	1903	Banbury	extant	first Baronet created Baron Banbury of Southam in 1924
Barber of Culham Court	1924	Barber	extinct 1927	
Barber of Greasley	1960	Barber	extant	
Barbour of Hilden	1943	Barbour	extinct 1951	
Baring of Nubia House	1911	Baring	extant	
Barker-Mill of Mottisfont	1836	Barker-Mill	extinct 1860	
Barker of Bishop's Stortford	1908	Barker	extinct 1914	
Barling of Edgbaston	1919	Barling	extinct 1940	
Barlow of Bradwall Hall	1907	Barlow	extant	
Barlow of Fort William	1803	Barlow	extant	
Barlow of London	1902	Barlow	extant	Physician to the King
Barlow of Westminster	1924	Barlow	extinct 1951	
Barnston of Churton	1924	Barnston	extinct 1929	
Baron of Holmbury House	1930	Baron	extinct 1934	
Barran of Sawley Hall	1895	Barran	extant	
Barrett-Lennard of Bell House	1801	Barrett-Lennard	extant	
Barrie of Adelphi Terrace	1913	Barrie	extinct 1937	
Barrington of Limerick	1831	Barrington	dormant	seventh Baronet died 2003
Barron of Glenanna	1841	Barron	extinct 1900	
Barrow of Ulverstone	1835	Barrow	extant	
Barry of Ockwells Manor	1899	Barry	extant	
Bartlett of Hardington	1913	Bartlett	dormant	unproven, baronetcy may exist, under investigation of crown (fourth Baronet died 1998)
Barton of Fethard	1918	Barton	extinct 1937	
Barttelot of Stopham	1875	Barttelot	extant	
Barwick of Ashbrooke Grange	1912	Barwick	extinct 1979	
Bass of Stafford	1882	Bass	extinct 1952	
Bateman of Hartington Hall	1806	Bateman	extant	second Baronet inherited the baronetcy of Scott of Great Barr in 1851; in 1905 the baronetcy was inherited by the fourth Fuller-Acland-Hood Baronet of St Audries.
Bates of Gwyn Castle	1880	Bates	extant	Unproven; sixth Baronet died 2007
Bates of Magherabuoy	1937	Bates	extant	
Bateson of Belvoir Park	1818	de Yarburgh-Bateson	extinct 2006	second Baronet created Baron Deramore in 1885
Batho of Frinton	1928	Batho	extant	Lord Mayor of London
Baxter of Invereighty	1918	Baxter	extinct 1926	
Baxter of Kilmaron	1863	Baxter	extinct 1872	
Bayley of Bedford Square	1834	Bayley, Laurie	extant	
Baynes of Harefield Place	1801	Baynes	extant	
Bayntun-Sandys of Missenden	1809	Bayntun-Sandys	extinct 1848	
Bazley of Tolmers	1869	Bazley	extant	
Beale of Drumlamford	1912	Beale	extinct 1922	
Beardmore of Flichity	1914	Beardmore	extinct 1936	first Baronet created Baron Invernairn in 1921
Beauchamp of Grosvenor Place	1911	Beauchamp	extinct 1976	
Beauchamp of Woodborough	1918	Beauchamp	extinct 1983	
Beckett of Kirkdale	1921	Beckett	extant	
Beckett of Leeds	1813	Beckett	extant	fifth Baronet created Baron Grimthorpe in 1886
Beecham of Mursley Hall	1914	Beecham	dormant	third Baronet died 1982
Beit of Tewin Water	1924	Beit	dormant	second Baronet died 1994
Bell of Framewood	1908	Bell	extinct 1924	Lord Mayor of London
Bell of Marlborough Terrace	1895	Bell	extinct 1943	Lord Provost of Glasgow
Bell of Mynthurst	1909	Bell	extinct 1955	
Bell of Rounton Grange	1885	Bell	extant	
Bellew of Mount Bellew	1838	Bellew, Grattan-Bellew	extant	
Benn of Bolton Gardens	1926	Benn	extinct 1937	first baronet created Baron Glenravel in 1936
Benn of Old Knoll	1914	Benn	extant	
Benn of Rollesby	1920	Benn	extinct 1992	
Bennett of Kirklington	1929	Bennett	extant	
Bensley of Marylebone	1801	Bensley	extinct 1809	
Benyon of Englefield	1958	Benyon	extinct 1959	
Beresford of Bagnall	1814	Beresford, Beresford-Pierse	extant	
Bernard of Snakemoor	1954	Bernard	extant	
Berry of Catton	1806	Berry	extinct 1831	
Berry of Dropmore	1928	Berry	extant	first Baronet created Viscount Kemsley in 1945
Berry of Hackwood Park	1921	Berry	extant	first Baronet created Viscount Camrose in 1941; baronetcy unproven as of 30 June 2006 (3rd baronet died 2001) – under review of the Registrar of the Baronetage
Bertie of the Navy	1812	Bertie	extinct 1824	
Bethell of Romford	1911	Bethell	extant	first Baronet created Baron Bethell in 1922
Bethune of Kilconquhar	1836	Bethune	extinct 1894	
Betterton of Blackfordby	1929	Betterton	extinct 1949	first Baronet created Baron Rushcliffe in 1935
Beynon of the Coldra	1920	Beynon	extinct 1944	
Bibby of Tarporley	1959	Bibby	extant	
Bilsland of Park Circus	1907	Bilsland	extinct 1970	Lord Provost of Glasgow; second Baronet created Baron Bilsland in 1950
Bingham of Sheffield	1903	Bingham	extinct 1945	
Birch of Hasles	1831	Birch	extinct 1880	
Birchenough of Macclesfield	1920	Birchenough	extinct 1937	
Bird of Edgbaston	1922	Bird	extant	
Birdwood of Anzac	1919	Birdwood	extant	first Baronet created Baron Birdwood in 1938
Birkbeck of Horstead Hall	1886	Birkbeck	extinct 1907	
Birkin of Ruddington Grange	1905	Birkin	extant	
Birkmyre of Dalmunzie	1921	Birkmyre	extant	
Black of Louth Park	1918	Black	extinct 1942	
Black of Midgham Park	1922	Black	extant	
Blackwood of the Navy	1814	Blackwood	extant	seventh Baronet succeeded as Baron Dufferin and Claneboye in 1988
Blades of Cobham	1922	Blades	extinct 1991	first Baronet created Baron Ebbisham in 1928
Blair of Harrow Weald	1945	Blair	extinct 1962	
Blake of Tillmouth	1907	Blake	extant	
Blaker of Brighton	1919	Blaker	extant	
Bland-Sutton of Hertford Street	1925	Bland-Sutton	extinct 1936	
Blane of Blanefield and Culverlands	1812	Blane	extinct 1916	
Blennerhassett of Blennerville	1809	Blennerhassett	extant	
Blomefield of Attleborough	1807	Blomefield	extant	
Blyth of Chelmsford	1895	Blyth	extant	first Baronet created Baron Blyth in 1907
Boileau of Tacolnestone Hall	1838	Boileau	extant	
Boles of Bishops Lydeard	1922	Boles	extant	
Bolton of West Plean	1927	Bolton	extinct 1982	
Bonham of Malmesbury	1852	Bonham	extant	
Bonsor of Kingswood	1925	Bonsor	extant	
Boord of Wakehurst	1896	Boord	extant	
Boot of Nottingham	1917	Boot	extinct 1956	first Baronet created Baron Trent in 1929
Booth of Allerton	1916	Booth	extant	
Booth of Portland Place	1835	Booth	extinct 1896	
Borough of Coolock Lodge	1813	Borough	extinct 1879	
Borthwick of Heath House	1887	Borthwick	extinct 1908	first Baronet created Baron Glenesk in 1895
Borthwick of Whitburgh	1908	Borthwick	extant	second Baronet created Baron Whitburgh in 1912, which title became extinct in 1967
Borwick of Hawkshead	1916	Borwick	extant	first Baronet created Baron Borwick in 1922
Bossom of Maidstone	1953	Bossom	extant	
Boswell of Auchinleck	1821	Boswell	extinct 1857	
Boehm, later Boehm-Boteler of Wetherby Gardens	1889	Boehm, Boehm-Boteler	extinct 1928	
Boulton of Braxted Park	1944	Boulton	extant	
Boulton of Copped Hall	1905	Boulton	dormant	fourth Baronet died 1996
Bourne of Hackinsall Hall and Heathfield	1880	Bourne	extinct 1883	
Bowater of Friston	1939	Bowater	extant	Lord Mayor of London
Bowater of Hill Crest	1914	Bowater	extant	Lord Mayor of London
Bowden of Nottingham	1915	Bowden	extant	
Bowen-Jones of St Mary's Court	1911	Bowen-Jones	extinct 1925	
Bowen of Colworth	1921	Bowen	extant	
Bower of Chislehurst	1925	Bower	extinct 1948	Lord Mayor of London
Bowlby of Manchester Square	1923	Bowlby	extant	
Bowles of Enfield	1926	Bowles	extinct 1943	
Bowman of Clifford Street and Joldwynds	1884	Bowman	extinct 2003	
Bowman of Killingworth	1961	Bowman	extinct 1990	
Bowring of Beechwood	1907	Bowring	extinct 1916	
Bowyer of Weston Underwood	1933	Bowyer	extant	first Baronet created Baron Denham in 1937
Boxall of Cambridge Square	1919	Boxall	extinct 1945	
Boyce of Badgeworth	1952	Boyce	extant	Lord Mayor of London
Boyd of Howth	1916	Boyd	extant	
Boyle of Ockham	1904	Boyle	extant	
Bradford of Mawddwy	1931	Bradford	extinct 1935	President of the Royal College of Physicians
Bradford of Minety	1902	Bradford	extant	
Brady of Hazelbrook	1869	Brady	extinct 1927	
Brain of Eynsham	1954	Brain	extant	President of the Royal College of Physicians; first Baronet created Baron Brain in 1962
Braithwaite of Burnham	1954	Braithwaite	extinct 1958	
Braithwate of Poston	1802	Braithwate	extinct 1809	
Bramwell of Hyde Park Gate	1889	Bramwell	extinct 1903	
Brassey of Apethorpe	1922	Brassey	extant	first Baronet created Baron Brassey of Apethorpe in 1938
Brenton of London	1812	Brenton	extinct 1862	
Brickwood of Portsmouth	1927	Brickwood	extinct 2006	
Briggs of Briggs Dayrell	1871	Briggs	extinct 1887	
Broadhead, later Brinckman of Monk Bretton	1831	Broadhead, Brinckman	extant	
Brisbane of Brisbane	1836	Brisbane	extinct 1860	
Briscoe of Bourne Hall	1910	Briscoe	extant	
Broadbent of Longwood and Brook Street	1893	Broadbent	dormant	fourth Baronet died 1992
Broadbridge of Brighton	1937	Broadbridge	extant	Lord Mayor of London; first Baronet created Baron Broadbridge in 1945
Broadhurst of North Rode	1918	Broadhurst	extinct 1922	
Brocklebank of Greenlands	1885	Brocklebank	extant	
Brocklehurst of Swythamley Park and Stanhope Terrace	1903	Brocklehurst	extinct 1981	
Brodie of Boxford and Savile Row	1834	Brode	dormant	fourth Baronet died 1971
Brodie of Idvies	1892	Brodie	extinct 1896	
Broke of Broke Hall	1813	Broke, Broke-Middleton	extinct 1887	
Bromhead of Thurlby	1806	Bromhead	extant	
Brooke of Colebrooke	1822	Brooke	extant	fifth Baronet created Viscount Brookeborough in 1952
Brooke of Almondbury	1919	Brooke	extant	
Brooke of Armitage Bridge	1899	Brooke	extinct 1908	
Brooke of Summerton	1903	Brooke	extant	
Brooks of Crawshaw Hall and Whatton House	1891	Brooks	extant	first Baronet created Baron Crawshaw in 1892
Brooks of Manchester	1886	Brooks	extinct 1900	
Brooksbank of Healaugh	1919	Brooksbank	extant	
Brotherton of Wakefield	1918	Brotherton	extinct 1930	first Baronet created Baron Brotherton in 1929
Brown of Astrop	1863	Brown	extant	
Brown of Broome Hall	1903	Brown, Piggott-Brown	extant	
Brownrigg of London	1816	Brownrigg	extant	
Bruce-Gardner of Frilford	1945	Bruce-Gardner	extant	
Bruce of Dublin	1812	Bruce	extinct 1841	
Bruce of Stonehill	1804	Bruce	extant	
Brunner of Druids Cross, Winnington Old Hall and Ennismore Gardens	1895	Brunner	dormant	third Baronet died 1982
Brunton of Stratford Place	1908	Brunton	extant	
Brydges, later Egerton-Barrett-Brydges of Denton Court	1815	Brydges, Egerton-Barrett-Brydges	extinct 1863	
Buchan-Hepburn of Smeaton	1815	Buchan-Hepburn	extant	
Buchanan of Dunburgh	1878	Buchanan	extant	
Buchanan of Lavington	1920	Buchanan	extinct 1935	first Baronet created Baron Woolavington in 1922
Buckley of Mawddwy	1868	Buckley	extinct 1919	
Bull of Hammersmith	1922	Bull	extant	
Buller of Tranant Park	1808	Buller	extinct 1824	
Bullock of Crosby	1954	Bullock	extinct 1966	
Bullough of Kinlock Castle	1916	Bullough	extinct 1939	
Burbidge of Littleton	1916	Burbidge	extant	
Burdon-Sanderson of Banbury Road	1899	Burdon-Sanderson	extinct 1905	
Burgoyne of the Army	1856	Burgoyne	extinct 1871	
Burne-Jones of Rottingdean and the Grange	1894	Burne-Jones	extinct 1926	
Burnett of Selborne House	1913	Burnett	extant	Lord Mayor of London
Burney of Preston Candover	1921	Burney	extant	
Burns of Wemyss Bay	1889	Burns	extinct 1957	first Baronet created Baron Inverclyde in 1897
Burrard of Lymington	1807	Burrard	extinct 1870	
Burroughs of Castle Bagshaw	1804	Burroughs	extinct 1829	
Burrows of London	1874	Burrows	extinct 1917	President of the Royal College of Physicians
Burton-Chadwick of Bidston	1935	Burton-Chadwick	extant	
Butcher of Danesfort	1918	Butcher	extinct 1935	first Baronet created Baron Danesfort in 1924
Butcher of Holland	1960	Butcher	extinct 1960	
Butler of Edgbaston	1926	Butler	extinct 1939	
Butler of Old Park	1922	Butler	extant	
Butlin of London	1911	Butlin	extinct 1916	
Butt of Westminster	1929	Butt	extinct 1999	
Buxton of Belfield	1840	Buxton	extant	
Buzzard of Munstead Grange	1929	Buzzard	extant	
Byass of Port Talbot	1926	Byass	extinct 1976	

== C ==
Title	Date of creation	Surname	Current status	Notes
Cahn of Stanford-upon-Soar	1934	Cahn	extant	
Cain of Wargrave	1920	Cain	extinct 1969	
Caine of Greeba Castle	1937	Caine	extinct 1971	
Caird of Belmont Castle	1913	Caird	extinct 1916	
Caird of Glenfarquhar	1928	Caird	extinct 1954	
Calthrop of Croxley House	1918	Calthrop	extinct 1919	
Calvert of Claydon House	1818	Calvert, Verney	extant	unproven (fifth Baronet died 2001 – under review
Cameron of Balclutha	1893	Cameron	extinct 1968	
Cameron of Fassiefern, Callart and Arthurstone	1817	Cameron	extinct 1863	
Campbell of Airds Bay and Bromley	1939	Campbell	extinct 1954	
Campbell of Ardnamurchan	1913	Campbell	dormant	second Baronet died 1943
Campbell of Barcaldine	1831	Campbell	extant	
Campbell of Blythswood	1880	Campbell	extinct 1908	first Baronet created Baron Blythswood in 1892, which title became extinct in 1940
Campbell of Carrick Buoy	1831	Campbell	extinct 1900	
Campbell of Dunstaffnage	1836	Campbell	extinct 1879	
Campbell of Gartsford	1815	Campbell, Cockburn-Campbell	extant	
Campbell of Gartsford	1821	Campbell, Cockburn-Campbell	extant	
Campbell of Inverneil	1818	Campbell	extinct 1819	
Campbell of Milltown	1917	Campbell	extinct 1984	first Baronet created Baron Glenavy in 1921
Campbell of New Brunswick	1831	Campbell	extinct 1949	
Campbell of St Cross Mede	1815	Campbell	extant	
Campbell of Succoth	1808	Campbell	extant	
Carbutt of Nanhurst	1892	Carbutt	extinct 1905	
Carden of Molesey	1887	Carden	extinct 2025	
Cargill of Glasgow	1920	Cargill	extinct 1954	
Carlile of Gayhurst	1928	Carilie	extinct 1950	
Carlile of Ponsbourne Park	1917	Carlile	extinct 1942	
Carmichael of Nutwood	1821	Carmichael	extinct 1902	
Cartier of Montreal	1868	Cartier	extinct 1873	
Cary of Withington	1955	Cary	extant	
Cassel of Bryanston Square	1920	Cassel	extant	
Catto of Cairncatto	1921	Catoo	extant	first Baronet created Baron Catto in 1936
Cautley of Horsted Keynes	1924	Cautley	extinct 1946	first Baronet created Baron Cautley in 1936
Cave of Cleve Hill, Sidbury Manor and Stoneleigh House	1896	Cave	extant	
Cawley of Prestwich	1906	Cawley	extant	first Baronet created Baron Cawley in 1918
Cayzer of Gartmore	1904	Cayzer	extant	
Cayzer of Roffey Park	1921	Cayzer	extinct 1999	second Baronet created a life peer as Baron Cayzer in 1982
Cayzer of Tylney	1924	Cayzer	extant	first Baronet created Baron Rotherwick in 1939
Chadwyck-Healey of Wyphurst	1919	Chadwyck-Healey	extant	
Chamberlain of London	1828	Chamberlain	extinct 1980	
Champion de Crespigny of Champion Lodge	1805	Champion de Crespigny	extinct 1952	
Champneys, later Dalrymple-Champneys of Littlemeads	1910	Champneys, Dalrymple–Champneys	extinct 1980	
Chance of the Grand Avenue	1900	Chance	extant	
Channing of Maiden Newton	1906	Channing	extinct 1926	first Baronet created Baron Channing of Wellingborough in 1912
Chapman of Cleadon	1958	Chapman	exant	
Charles of Waltham Abbey and Manchester Square	1928	Charles	extinct 1975	
Chatterton of Castle Mahon	1801	Chatterton	extinct 1874	
Chaytor of Croft	1831	Chaytor	dormant	seventh Baronet died 1976 – under review
Cheyne of Leagarth	1908	Cheyne	extant	
Chichester of Arlington Court	1840	Chichester	extinct 1881	
Chichester of Green Castle	1821	Chichester	extinct 1847	
Child of Bromley Place	1919	Child	extant	
Child of Newfield, Stallington and Dunlosset	1868	Child	extinct 1958	
Chisholm of Belhaven Terrace	1902	Chisholm	extinct 1923	Lord Provost of Glasgow
Chitty of the Temple	1924	Chitty	extant	
Cholmeley of Easton	1806	Cholmeley	extant	
Christison of Moray Place	1871	Christison	extinct 1993	
Chubb of Newlands	1900	Chubb	extant	first Baronet created Baron Hayter in 1927; baronetcy unproven as of 30 June 2006 (3rd baronet died 2003) – under review of the Registrar of the Baronetage
Chubb of Stonehenge	1919	Chubb	extinct 1957	
Church of Woodside, Belshill and Harley Street	1901	Church	extinct 1979	President of the Royal College of Physicians
Churchman of Ipswich	1917	Churchman	extinct 1949	first Baronet created Baron Woodbridge in 1932
Churchman of Melton	1938	Churchman	extinct 1947	
Chute of the Vyne	1952	Chute	extinct 1956	
Clark of Cavendish Square	1883	Clark	extinct 1979	
Clark of Dunlambert	1917	Clark	extant	
Clark of Melville Crescent	1886	Clark	extant	Lord Provost of Edinburgh
Clark of St George's	1837	Clark	extinct 1910	
Clarke of Crosses Green House	1804	Clarke, Clarke-Travers	extinct 1926	
Clarke of Dunham Lodge	1831	Clark	extant	
Clarke of Rupert's Wood	1882	Clarke	extant	unproven (third Baronet died 2005) – under review
Claughton of Dudley Priory	1912	Claughton	extinct 1921	
Clay of Fulwell Lodge	1841	Clay	extant	
Clayton-East of Hall Place	1838	Clayton-East, East, Clayton-East-Clayton	extinct 1932	
Clifford of Flaxbourne	1887	Clifford	extinct 2025	
Clifford of the Navy	1838	Clifford	extinct 1895	
Close of Mysore	1812	Close	extinct 1813	
Clouston of Montreal	1908	Clouston	extinct 1912	
Coates of Haypark	1921	Coates	extant	
Coates of Helperby Hall	1911	Coates, Milnes-Coates	extant	
Coats of Ballathie	1905	Coats	extant	
Cochrane of Woodbrook	1903	Cochrane	extant	
Cochrane of Woodbrook	1915	Cochrane	extinct 1949	
Coddington of Wycollar	1896	Coddington	extinct 1918	
Codrington of Dodington	1876	Codrington	extant	unproven (third Baronet died 2005) – under review
Coffin of the Magdalaine Islands	1804	Coffin	extinct 1839	
Cohen of Highfield	1905	Cohen	extinct 1968	
Colfox of Symonsbury	1939	Colfox	extant	
Collet of St Clere	1888	Collet	extinct 1944	
Collett of London	1934	Collett	extant	Lord Mayor of London
Collier of the Navy	1814	Collier	extinct 1824	
Colman of Gatton Park	1907	Colman	extant	
Colman of Reigate	1952	Colman	extinct 1966	
Conant of Lyndon	1954	Conant	extant	
Congreve of Congreve	1927	Congreve	extinct 1941	
Congreve of Walton	1812	Congreve	extinct 1881	
Conroy of Llanbrynmair	1837	Conroy	extinct 1900	
Clifford-Constable of Tixall	1815	Clifford-Constable	extinct 1894	
Cook of Doughty House	1886	Cook	extant	
Cooper of Berrydown Court	1920	Cooper	extinct 1922	Lord Mayor of London
Cooper of Hursley Park	1905	Cooper	extinct 1961	
Cooper of Shenstone Court	1905	Cooper	extant	
Cooper of Singleton	1941	Cooper	extinct 1941	
Cooper of Walcot	1828	Cooper	extinct 1828	
Cooper of Woollahra	1863	Cooper	extant	
Cope of Osbaston Hall	1918	Cope	extinct 1966	
Cope of St Mellons	1928	Cope	extinct 1946	first Baronet created Baron Cope in 1945
Corbet of Moreton Corbet and Linslede	1808	Corbet	extinct 1996	
Cornwall of Holcombe Burnell	1918	Cornwall	extinct 1962	
Corrigan of Cappagh, Inniscorrig and Marrion Square	1866	Corrigan	extinct 1883	
Corry of Dunraven	1885	Corry	dormant	fourth Baronet died 2000
Cory-Wright of Mackerye End	1903	Cory-Wright	extant	
Cory of Coryton	1919	Cory	extant	
Cory of Llantarnam Abbey	1907	Cory	extinct 1941	
Cotterell of Garnons	1805	Cotterell	extant	
Cotts of Coldharbour	1921	Cotts	extant	
Couper of the Army	1841	Couper	extant	
Courtauld of Penny Pot	1939	Courtauld	extinct 1940	
Courthope of Whiligh	1925	Courthope	extinct 1955	first Baronet created Baron Courthope in 1945
Cowan of Beeslack	1894	Cowan	extinct 1900	
Cowan of the Baltic	1921	Cowan	extinct 1956	
Cowell-Stepney of Llanelly	1871	Cowell-Stepney	extinct 1909	
Cox of Old Windsor	1921	Cox	extinct 1922	
Coxen of Seal	1941	Coxen	extinct 1946	Lord Mayor of London
Craig of Alsager	1927	Craig	extinct 1933	
Craig of Stormont	1918	Craig	extinct 2025	first Baronet created Viscount Craigavon in 1927
Craik of Kennoway	1926	Craik	extinct 1955	
Crampton of Merrion Square	1839	Crampton	extinct 1886	
Craven	1942	Craven	extinct 1946	
Crisp of Bungay	1913	Crisp	extant	
Critchett of Harley Street	1908	Critchet	extant	
Croft of Bournemouth	1924	Croft	extant	first Baronet created Baron Croft in 1940
Croft of Cowling Hall	1818	Croft	extant	
Crofton of Longford House	1838	Crofton	extant	unproven (sixth Baronet died 2002) – under review
Crofton of Mohill Castle	1801	Crofton	dormant	seventh Baronet died 1987
Crompton of Wood End	1838	Crompton	extinct 1849	
Crosfield of Highgate	1915	Crosfield	extinct 1938	
Cross of Bolton-le-Moors	1941	Cross	extinct 1968	
Cross of Marchbankwood	1912	Cross	extinct 1963	
Crossley of Combermere Abbey	1909	Crossley	extant	unproven (fifth Baronet died 2003) – under review
Crossley of Halifax	1863	Crossley	extant	second Baronet created Baron Somerleyton in 1916
Cunard of Bush Hill	1859	Cubard	extinct 1989	
Cunliffe-Owen of Weir Bank	1920	Cunliffe-Owen	extant	
Cunningham of Crookedstone	1963	Cunningham	extinct 1976	
Cunningham of Hyndhope	1942	Cunningham	extinct 1963	first Baronet created Viscount Cunningham of Hyndhope in 1946
Curre of Itton Court	1928	Curre	extinct 1930	
Currie	1847	Currie	extant	
Curtis of Cullands Grove	1802	Curtis	extant	
Cust of Leasowe Castle	1876	Cust	extinct 1931	
Cuyler of St John Lodge	1814	Cuyler	extinct 1947	

== D ==
Title	Date of creation	Surname	Current status	Notes
D'Avigdor-Goldsmid of Somerhill	1934	D'Avigdor-Goldsmid	extinct 1987	
D'Oyly of Kandy	1821	D'Oyly	extinct 1824	
Dale of West Lodge	1895	Dale	extinct 1932	
Dalgleish of Erroll Park, Mayfield, Woodburne and Baltilly, and Coulin	1896	Dalgleish	extinct 1913	
Dalrymple-Horn-Elphinstone of Horn and Logie Elphinstone	1828	Dalrymple-Horn-Elphinstone	dormant 1956	
Dalrymple-White of High Mark	1926	Dalrymple-White	extant	
Dalrymple of New Hailes	1887	Dalrymple	extinct 1971	
Dalziel of Brookland	1918	Dalziel	extinct 1935	first Baronet created Baron Dalziel of Kirkcaldy in 1921
Dalziel of Grosvenor Place	1919	Dalziel	extinct 1928	first Baronet created Baron Dalziel of Wooler in 1927
Dalrymple of High Mark	1815	Dalrymple	extinct 1866	
David of Bombay	1911	David	extinct 1964	
Davis-Goff of Glenville	1905	Davis-Goff	extant	
Davis of Barrington Hall	1946	Davis	extant	Lord Mayor of London
Davis of Hollywood	1845	Davis	extinct 1896	
Davson of Berbice	1927	Davson	extant	unproven (third Baronet died 2004) – under review
Davy of Grosvenor Street	1818	Davy	extinct 1829	
Dawson of Appleton Roebuck	1929	Dawson	extinct 1974	
Dawson of Edgwarebury	1920	Dawson	extant	
de Bathe of Knightstown, Cashell and Ladyrath	1801	de Bathe	extinct 1941	
de Bunsen of Abbey Lodge	1919	de Bunsen	extinct 1932	
de Capell-Brooke of Oakley	1803	de Capell-Brooke	extinct 1968	
de la Bere of Crowborough	1953	de La Bere	extant	Lord Mayor of London
de La Rue of Normans	1898	de La Rue	extant	
de Robeck of Naas	1919	de Robeck	extinct 1928	
de Saumarez of Guernsey	1801	de Saumarez	extant	first Baronet created Baron de Saumarez in 1831
de Sausmarez of Jedburg	1928	de Sausmarez	extinct 1941	
de Trafford of Trafford Park	1841	de Trafford	extant	
Debenham of Bladen	1931	Debenham	extant	
Denman of Staffield	1945	Denman	extant	second Baronet succeeded as Baron Denman in 1971
Denny of Dumbarton	1913	Denny	extant	
Denys of Stratford Place	1813	Denys	extinct 1960	
Devitt of Pangbourne	1916	Devitt	extant	
Devitt of Pangbourne	1931	Devitt	extinct 1947	
Dewar of Dupplin	1907	Dewar	extant	first Baronet created Baron Forteviot in 1917
Dewar of Homestall Manor	1917	Dewar	extinct 1930	first Baronet created Baron Dewar in 1919
Dewey of Asheldham	1917	Dewey	extant	
Dickson-Poynder of Hardingham Hall	1802	Dickson-Poynder	extinct 1936	sixth Baronet created Baron Islington in 1910
Dilke of Sloane Street	1862	Dilke	extant	
Dillon of Lismullen	1801	Dillon	extinct 1982	
Dillwyn-Llewellyn of Penllergaer and Ynis y gerwn	1890	Dillwyn-Llewellyn, Dillwyn-Venables-Llewellyn	extant	
Dimsdale of Goldsmiths and Lancaster Street	1902	Dimsdale	extinct 1978	Lord Mayor of London
Dixon-Hartland of Middleton Manor	1892	Dixon-Hartland	extinct 1909	
Dixon of Astle	1919	Dixon	extant	
Dixon of Ballymenock	1903	Dixon	extant	Lord Mayor of Belfast; third Baronet created Baron Glentoran in 1939
Dixon of Warford	1918	Dixon	extinct 1920	
Dodds of West Chiltington	1964	Dodds	extant	President of the Royal College of Physicians
Domvile of Templeogue and Santry House	1815	Domvile	extinct 1913	
Domville of St Albans	1814	Domville	extinct 1981	Lord Mayor of London
Donner of Oak Mount	1907	Donner	extinct 1934	
Dorington of Lypiatt	1886	Dorington	extinct 1911	
Dorman of Nunthorpe	1923	Dorman	extant	
Douglas of Castle Douglas and Newton-Douglas	1801	Douglas	extinct 1809	
Douglas of Glenbervie	1831	Douglas	extinct 1986	
Doyle of Buscombe	1828	Doyle	extinct 1987	
Doyle of Guernsey	1825	Doyle	extinct 1834	The first Baronet had been gazetted a baronet in 1805 but this creation does not appear to have passed the Great Seal.
Drughorn of Ifield Hall	1922	Drughorn	extinct 1943	
Drummond, later Williams-Drummond of Hawthornden	1828	Drummond, Williams-Drummond	extinct 1976	
Drummond of Lasswade	1922	Drummond	extinct 1924	
Du Cros of Canons	1916	Du Cros	extant	
Duckworth of Grosvenor Place	1909	Duckworth	extant	
Duckworth of Topsham	1813	Duckworth	extinct 1887	
Dudley-Williams of Exeter	1964	Dudley-Williams	extant	
Dudley of Sloane Street and Kilscoran House	1813	Dudley	extinct 1824	
Duff of Halkin	1813	Duff, Duff-Gordon	extant	
Duff of Hatton	1952	Duff	extinct 1952	
Assheton-Smith, later Duff of Vaynol Park	1911	Assheton-Smith, Duff	extinct 1980	
Dugdale of Crathorne	1945	Dugdale	extant	first Baronet created Baron Crathorne in 1959
Dugdale of Merevale	1936	Dugdale	extant	
Duke of London	1849	Duke	extinct 1935	Lord Mayor of London
Dunbar of Boath	1814	Dunbar	extinct 1937	
Duncan of Horsforth Hall	1905	Duncan	extinct 1964	
Duncan of Jordanstone	1957	Duncan	extinct 1974	
Duncombe of Wood Hall	1919	Duncombe	extinct 1933	
Dundas of Arniston	1898	Dundas	extinct 1970	
Dundas of Beechwood	1821	Dundas	extinct 1981	
Dundas of Richmond	1815	Dundas	extinct 1868	
Dunlop of Dunlop	1838	Dunlop	extinct 1858	
Dunlop of Woodbourne	1916	Dunlop	extant	Lord Provost of Glasgow
Dunn of Bathurst	1921	Dunn	extinct 1976	
Dunn of Clitheroe	1917	Dunn	extinct 1971	Lord Mayor of London
Dunn of Lakenheath	1895	Dunn	extinct 1912	
Dunnell of York	1922	Dunnell	extinct 1960	
Dunning of Beedinlee	1930	Dunning	extinct 2025	
Dunnington-Jefferson of Thorhanby Hall	1958	Dunnington-Jefferson	extant	
Dupree of Craneswater	1921	Dupree	dormant	third Baronet died 1971
Durand of Ruckley Grange	1892	Durand	extant	
Durning-Lawrence of King's Ride	1898	Durning-Lawrence	extinct 1914	
Duveen of Milbank	1927	Duveen	extinct 1939	first Baronet created Baron Duveen in 1933
Dymoke of Scrivelsby	1841	Dymoke	extinct 1865	

== E ==
Title	Date of creation	Surname	Current status	Notes
Eardley-Wilmot of Berkswell Hall	1821	Eardley-Wilmot	extant	
Smith, later Eardley of Hadley	1802	Smith, Eardley	extinct 1875	
Earle of Allerton Tower	1869	Earle	extant	
East of Calcutta	1823	East	extinct 1878	
Easthope of Fir Grove	1841	Easthope	extinct 1865	
Ebrahim of Pabaney Villa	1910	Ebrahim	extant	
Eckstein of Fairwarp and the Sudan	1929	Eckstein	extinct 1948	
Edgar of Chalfont	1920	Edgar	extinct 1934	
Edge of Ribble Lodge	1937	Edge	dormant	second Baronet died 1984
Edwards-Moss of Chiddingfold	1868	Edwards-Moss	dormant	fourth Baronet died 1988
Edwards of Garth	1838	Edwards	extinct 1850	
Edwards of Knighton	1907	Edwards	extinct 1927	
Edwards of Pye Nest	1866	Edwards	extant	
Edwards of Treforis	1921	Edwards	extinct 1999	
Eley of Sagamore	1921	Eley	extinct 1951	
Elgar of Broadheath	1931	Elgar	extinct 1934	composer Sir Edward Elgar
Ellerman of Connaught Square	1905	Ellerman	extinct 1973	
Elliot of Penshaw	1874	Elliot	extinct 1911	
Elliott of Limpsfield	1917	Elliott	extant	
Ellis-Griffith of Llanindan	1918	Ellis-Grffith	extinct 1934	
Ellis-Nanney of Gwynfryn and Cefndeuddwr	1898	Ellis-Nanney	extinct 1920	
Ellis of Byfleet and Hertford Street	1882	Ellis	extinct 1912	Lord Mayor of London
Ellis of Threshfield	1932	Ellis	extinct 1956	
Elphinstone of Sowerby	1816	Elphinstone	extant	
Elton of Widworthy Court	1838	Elton	extinct 1884	
Emerson-Tennent of Tempo Manor	1867	Emerson-Tennent	extinct 1876	
Ennis of Balinahoun Court	1866	Ennis	extinct 1884	
Erichsen of Cavendish Place	1895	Erichsen	extinct 1896	
Errington of Lackham Manor	1885	Errington	extinct 1920	
Errington of Ness	1963	Errington	extant	
Erskine-Hill of Quothquhan	1945	Erskine-Hill	extant	
Erskine of Cambo	1821	Erskine	extant	
Erskine of Rerrick	1961	Erskine	extinct 1995	first Baronet created Baron Erskine of Rerrick in 1964
Esplen of Hardres Court	1921	Esplen	extant	
Evans-Bevan of Cadoxton Juxta	1958	Evans-Bevan	extant	
Evans of Allestree Hall	1887	Evans	extinct 1892	
Evans of Rottingdean	1963	Evans	extinct 1983	
Evans of Tubbendeny	1902	Evans	extinct 1970	
Evans of Wightwick	1920	Evans	extant	
Eve of Silsoe	1943	Eve	extant	first Baronet created Baron Silsoe in 1963
Everard of Randlestown	1911	Everard	extant	
Ewart of Glenmachan	1887	Ewart	dormant	sixth Baronet died 1995
Ewart of White House	1910	Ewart	extinct 1928	

== F ==
Title	Date of creation	Surname	Current status	Notes
Fairbairn of Ardwick	1869	Fairbairn	extant	
Fairfax of Holmes	1836	Fairfax, Ramsay-Fairfax, Cameron-Ramsay-Fairfax, Lucy	extant	
Falkiner of Abbotstown	1812	Falkiner	extinct 1824	
Falle of Portsea	1916	Falle	extinct 1948	first Baronet created Baron Portsea in 1934
Falshaw of Edinburgh	1876	Falshaw	extinct 1889	Lord Provost of Edinburgh
Farquhar of White Lodge	1892	Farquhar	extinct 1923	first Baronet created Baron Farquhar in 1898
Farrar of Chicheley Hall	1911	Farrar	extinct 1915	
Farrer of Abinger	1883	Farrer	extinct 1964	first Baronet created Baron Farrer in 1893
Farrington of Wordon Hall	1818	Farrington	extant	
Faudel-Phillips of Grosvenor Gardens	1897	Faudel-Phillips	extinct 1941	Lord Mayor of London
Fayrer of Tullycleagh	1896	Fayrer	extant	
Feilden of Feniscowles	1846	Feilden	extant	
Ferguson-Davie of Creedy	1847	Ferguson-Davie	extant	
Fergusson, later Colyear-Fergusson of Spitalhaugh and George Street	1866	Fergusson, Colyer-Fergusson	extinct 2004	
Ferguson of The Farm	1801	Ferguson	extinct 1860	
Fettes of Comely Bank	1804	Fettis	extinct 1836	
Findlay of Aberlour	1925	Findlay	extinct 1979	
Finlay of Epping	1964	Finlay	extant	
Firth of The Flush	1909	Firth	extinct 1936	
Fison of Greenholme	1905	Fison	extant	
Fitzgerald of Cork	1903	Fitzgerald	extant	
Fitzgerald of Newmarket on Fergus	1822	Fitzgerald	extinct 1908	
Fitzgerald of Valencia	1880	Fitzgerald	extant	
Flannery of Wethersfield Manor	1904	Flannery	extinct 1959	
Flavelle of Toronto	1917	Flavelle	extinct 1985	
Fleetwood of Rossall Hall	1838	Fleetwood	extinct 1866	
Fletcher of Bryony Hill	1919	Fletcher	extinct 1924	
Fletcher of Carrow	1812	Fletcher	extinct 1876	
Flower of Lobb	1809	Flower	extinct 1850	Lord Mayor of London
Floyd of Chearsley Hill	1816	Floyd	extant	
Forbes-Leith of Fyvie	1923	Forbes-Leith	extant	
Forbes of Newe	1823	Forbes	extant	
Ford of Westerdunes	1929	Ford	extant	
Forestier-Walker of Rhiwderin	1929	Forestier-Walker	extinct 1934	
Forrest of Comiston	1838	Forrest	extinct 1928	Lord Provost of Edinburgh
Forster of Lysways Hall	1874	Forster	extinct 1930	
Forster of The Grange	1912	Forster	extinct 1930	
Forwood of Stoney Cross	1895	Forwood	extant	
Foster of Glyde Court	1831	Foster	extinct 1947	
Foster of Glyde Court	1930	Foster	extant	
Foster of Norwich	1838	Foster	extinct 1960	
Fowke of Lowesby	1814	Fowke	extant	
Fowler of Gastard House and Bruce Grove	1885	Fowler	extinct 1902	Lord Mayor of London
Fowler of Braemore	1890	Fowler	extinct 1933	
Fox of Liverpool	1924	Fox	extinct 1959	
Frank of Withyam	1920	Frank	extant	
Fraser of Cromarty	1921	Fraser	extinct 1992	
Fraser of Ledeclune	1806	Fraser	extinct 1979	
Fraser of Tain	1943	Fraser	extant	
Fraser of Dineiddwg	1961	Fraser	extinct 1987	first Baronet created Baron Fraser of Allander in 1964
Freake of Cromwell House	1882	Cromwell	extinct 1951	
Freeling of the General Post Office and Ford and Hutchings	1828	Freeling	extinct 1941	
Freeman of Murtle	1945	Freeman	dormant	second Baronet died 1981
Fremantle of Swanbourne	1821	Fremantle	extant	first Baronet created Baron Cottesloe in 1874
Frere of Wimbledon	1876	Frere	extinct 1933	
Fry of Oare	1929	Fry	extinct 1960	
Fry of Woodburn	1894	Fry	extinct 1987	
Fuller-Acland-Hood of St Audries	1809	Fuller-Acland-Hood	dormant	fourth Baronet succeeded to Bateman Baronetcy of Hartington Hall in 1905 and was created Baron St Audries in 1911, the latter title which became extinct in 1971; seventh and fifth Baronet died 1971
Fuller-Eliott-Drake of Nutwell Court, Buckland Abbey and Yarcombe	1821	Fuller-Eliott-Drake	extinct 1916	
Fuller of Neston Park	1910	Fuller	extant	
Furness of Tunstall Grange	1913	Furness	extant	

== G ==
Title	Date of creation	Surname	Current status	Notes
Gabriel of Edgecombe Hall	1867	Gabriel	extinct 1891	Lord Mayor of London
Galbraith of Shanwally	1813	Galbraith	extinct 1827	
Gamble of Windlehurst	1897	Gamble	extant	
Gammans of Hornsey	1956	Gammans	extinct 1957	
Ganzoni of Ipswich	1929	Ganzoni	extinct 2005	first Baronet created Baron Belstead in 1938
Garthwaite of Durham	1919	Garthwaite	extant	
George of Park Place and St Stephen's Green	1809	George	extinct 1856	
Gibbons of Sittingbourne	1872	Gibbons	extinct 1876	Lord Mayor of London
Gibson-Craig of Carmichael	1831	Gibson-Craig	extant	fifth Baronet succeeded as Gibson-Craig-Carmichael Baronet of Keirhill (created in the Baronetage of Nova Scotia in 1702) in 1926, since when the two titles have been merged
Gibson of Great Warley	1926	Gibson	extinct 1997	
Gibson of Linconia and Faccombe	1931	Gibson	extant	
Gibson of Regent Terrace	1909	Gibson	extinct 1912	
Gilbert	1850	Gilbert	extinct ?	
Gilbey of Elsenham	1893	Gilbey	extant	
Gillett of Bassishaw Ward	1959	Gillett	extant	Lord Mayor of London
Gilmour of Liberton	1926	Gilmour	extant	third Baronet created a life peer as Baron Gilmour of Craigmillar in 1992
Gilmour of Lundin	1897	Gilmour	extant	
Gilpin of Hockliffe Grange	1876	Gilpin	extinct 1882	
Gilstrap of Fornham Park	1887	Gilstrap	extinct 1896	
Gladstone of Fasque	1846	Gladstone	extant	
Glen-Coats of Ferguslie Park	1894	Glen-Coats	extinct 1954	
Glover of Arkley	1920	Glover	extinct 1934	
Glyn of Farnborough	1934	Glyn	extinct 1960	first Baronet created Baron Glyn in 1953
Godlee of Coombe End	1912	Godlee	extinct 1925	
Goff of Goffs Oak	1936	Goff	extinct 1939	
Goldney of Bradenstoke Abbey	1880	Goldney	extinct 1974	
Goldsmid of St Johns Lodge	1841	Goldsmid	extinct 1896	
Gooch of Clewer Park	1866	Gooch	extant	unproven (fifth Baronet died 2003) – under review
Goodenough of Broadwell and Filkins	1943	Goodenough	extant	
Goodhart of Holtye	1911	Goodhart	extant	
Goodson of Waddeton Court	1922	Goodson	extant	
Goold of Old Court	1801	Goold	extant	
Gordon-Cumming of Altyre and Gordonstoun	1804	Gordon-Cumming	extant	
Gordon of Northcourt	1818	Gordon	extinct 1876	
Goschen of Beacon Lodge	1916	Goschen	extant	
Goschen of Durrington House	1927	Goschen	extinct 1945	
Gough of Synone and Drangan	1842	Gough	extinct 2023	first Baronet created Viscount Gough in 1849
Goulding of Millicent and Roebuck Hill	1904	Goulding	dormant	third Baronet died 1982
Goulding of Wargrave Hall	1915	Goulding	extinct 1936	first Baronet created Baron Wargrave in 1922
Graaf of Tygerberg	1911	Graaf	extant	
Graham-Moon of Portman Square	1855	Graham-Moon	extant	Lord Mayor of London
Graham of Dromore	1964	Graham	extant	
Graham of Kirkstall	1808	Graham	extinct 1895	
Graham of Larbert House and Househill	1906	Graham	extant	
Grant of Forres	1924	Grant	extinct 1947	
Grant of Househill	1926	Grant	extinct 1932	
Graves-Sawle of Penrice and Barley	1836	Graves-Sawle	extinct 1932	
Gray of Tunstall Manor	1917	Gray	extant	
Grayson of Ravens Point	1922	Grayson	extant	
Green of Belsize Park	1901	Green	extinct 1959	Lord Mayor of London
Green of Milnrow	1805	Green	extinct 1831	
Green of Wakefield	1886	Green	extant	
Greenall of Walton Hall	1876	Greenall	extant	second Baronet created Baron Daresbury in 1927
Greenaway of Coombe	1933	Greenaway	extant	Lord Mayor of London
Greene of Nether Hall	1900	Greene	extinct 1966	
Greenhill-Russell of Chequers Court	1831	Greenhill-Russell	extinct 1836	
Green-Price of Norton Manor	1874	Green-Price	extant	
Greenway of Stanbridge Earls	1919	Greenway	extant	first Baronet created Baron Greenway in 1927
Greenwell of Marden Park and Greenwell	1906	Greenwell	extant	
Greenwood of Holborn	1915	Greenwood	extinct 2003	first Baronet created Viscount Greenwood in 1929
Gregory of Bristol	1931	Gregory	extinct 1952	
Grey of Fallodon	1814	Grey	extant	
Griffies-Williams of Llwyny Wormwood	1815	Griffies-Williams	extinct 1877	
Griffith of Munster Grillagh and Pencraig	1858	Griffith, Waldie-Griffith	extinct 1933	
Grimston of Westbury	1952	Grimston	extant	first Baronet created Baron Grimston of Westbury in 1964; baronetcy unproven (2nd baronet died 2003)
Grogan of Moyvore	1859	Grogan	extinct 1927	
Grotrian of Leighton Buzzard	1934	Grotrian	extant	
Grove of Fern	1874	Grove	dormant	third Baronet died 1962
Guest of Dowlais	1838	Guest	extant	second Baronet created Baron Wimborne in 1880, second Baron created Viscount Wimborne in 1918
Guinness of Ashford	1867	Guinness	extant	second Baronet created Baron Ardilaun in 1880, which title became extinct in 1915
Guinness of Iveagh	1885	Guinness	extant	first Baronet created Earl of Iveagh in 1919
Gull of Brook Street	1872	Gull	extant	
Gunston of Wickwar	1938	Gunston	extant	
Gunter of Weatherby	1901	Gunter	extinct 1980	
Guthrie of Brent Eleigh Hall	1936	Guthrie	extant	
Gwynne-Evans of Oaklands Park	1913	Gwynne-Evans, Evans-Tipping	extant	

== H ==
Title	Date of creation	Surname	Current status	Notes
Hacking of Altham	1938	Hacking	extant	first Baronet created Baron Hacking in 1945
Hadfield of Sheffield	1917	Hadfield	extinct 1940	
Halford of Wistow	1809	Halford	extinct 1897	Sir Henry Halford, Royal physician 1793-1844
Hall of Burton Park	1919	Hall	extant	
Hall of Grafham	1923	Hall	extant	
Hall of Llanover	1838	Hall	extinct 1867	first Baronet created Baron Llanover in 1859
Halsey of Gaddesdon	1920	Halsey	extant	
Hambling of Oxford	1924	Hambling	extant	
Hamilton of Cadogan Square	1892	Hamilton	extinct 1928	
Hamilton of Ilford	1937	Hamilton	extinct 1992	
Hamilton of Marlborough House	1819	Hamilton	extant	second Baronet succeeded to the Hamilton Baronetcy of Trebinshun in 1851
Hamilton of Woodbrook	1814	Hamilton	extinct 1876	
Hammick of Green Hayes	1834	Hammick	extant	
Hansen of Bideford	1921	Hansen	extinct 1958	
Hanson of Bryanston Square	1887	Hanson	extinct 1996	Lord Mayor of London
Hanson of Fowey	1918	Hanson	extant	Lord Mayor of London
Hardinge of Belle Isle	1801	Hardinge	dormant	fifth Baronet died 1968; see also the Viscount Hardinge
Hardy of Dunstall Hall	1876	Hardy	extant	
Hardy of the Navy	1806	Hardy	extinct 1839	
Hare of Stow Hall	1818	Hare	extant	
Hare of Stow Hall	1905	Hare	extinct 1941	
Harford of Falcondale	1934	Harford	extant	
Harland of Ormiston and Brompton	1885	Harland	extinct 1895	
Harland of Sutton Hall	1808	Harland	extinct 1810	
Harmar-Nicholls	1960	Harmar-Nicholls, Nicholls	extinct 2000	
Harmood-Banner of Liverpool	1924	Harmood-Banner	extinct 1990	
Harmsworth of Freshwater Grove	1922	Harmsworth	dormant	second Baronet died 1977
Harmsworth of Hemstead	1910	Harmsworth	extant	first Baronet created Viscount Rothermere in 1919
Harmsworth of Moray Lodge	1918	Harmsworth	extinct 1980	
Harmsworth of Elmwood and Sutton Place	1904	Harmsworth	extinct 1922	first Baronet created Viscount Northcliffe in 1918
Harnage of Belswardyne	1821	Harnage	extinct 1888	
Harris of Chipping Wycombe	1953	Harris	extinct 1956	
Harris of Bethnal Green	1932	Harris	extant	
Harrison of Bugbrooke	1961	Harrison	extant	
Harrison of Eaglescliffe	1922	Harrison	extant	
Harrison of Le Court	1917	Harrison	extinct 1934	
Hart of Kilmoriaty	1893	Hart	extinct 1970	
Hartwell of Dale Hall	1805	Hartwell	extant	
Harty of Prospect House	1831	Harty	extinct 1939	Lord Mayor of Dublin
Harvey of Crown Point	1868	Harvey	extant	fourth Baronet had already been created Baron Harvey of Tasburgh (1954) when he succeeded to the Baronetcy in 1954
Harvey of Langley Park	1868	Harvey	extinct 1931	
Harvey of Threadneedlestreet	1933	Harvey	extant	
Harvie-Watt of Bathgate	1945	Harvie-Watt	extant	
Hastings, later Abney-Hastings of Willesley Hall	1806	Hastings, Abney-Hastings	extinct 1858	
Hatch of Portland Place	1908	Hatch	extinct 1927	
Havelock-Allan of Lucknow	1858	Havelock-Allan	extant	
Hawkey of Woodford	1945	Hawkey	extinct 1975	
Hawkins-Whitshed of Killincarrick and Jobstown	1834	Hawkins-Whitshed	extinct 1871	
Haworth of Dunham Massey	1911	Haworth	extant	
Hayter of South Hill Park	1858	Hayter	extinct 1917	second Baronet created Baron Haversham in 1906
Head of Rochester	1838	Head	extant	
Headlam of Holywell	1935	Headlam	extinct 1964	
Heath of Ashorne Hill	1904	Heath	extinct 1942	
Heathcoat-Amory of Knightshayes Court	1874	Heathcoat-Amory	extant	fourth Baronet created Viscount Amory in 1960, which title became extinct in 1981
Heaton of Mundarrah Towers	1912	Heaton, Henniker-Heaton	extant	
Henderson-Stewart of Callumshill	1957	Henderson-Stewart	extant	
Henderson of Buscot Lodge	1902	Henderson	extant	first Baronet created Baron Faringdon in 1916
Hennessy of Windlesham	1927	Hennessy	extant	first Baronet created Baron Windlesham in 1937
Henniker of Newton Hall	1813	Henniker	dormant	eighth Baronet died 1991 – under review
Henry of Cahore	1923	Henry	extant	
Henry of Campden House Court	1918	Henry	extinct 1931	
Henry of Parkwood	1911	Henry	extinct 1919	
Herbert of Boyton	1936	Herbert	extinct 1939	
Herbert of Llanarth	1907	Herbert	extinct 1933	first Baronet created Baron Treowen in 1917
Herbert of Wilton	1937	Herbert	extinct 1942	
Hermon-Hodge	1902	Hermon-Hodge	extinct 1999	first Baronet created Baron Wyfold in 1919
Herschel of Slough	1838	Herschel	extinct 1950	
Hervey-Bathurst of Clarendon Park	1818	Hervey-Bathurst	extant	
Hewett of Chesterfield Street	1883	Hewett	extinct 1891	
Hewett of Netherseale	1813	Hewett	extant	
Hewitt of Barnsley	1921	Hewitt	extant	
Heygate of Southend	1831	Heygate	extant	
Heywood of Claremont	1838	Heywood	extant	
Hibbert of Chorley	1919	Hibbert	extinct 1927	
Hicking of Southwell	1917	Hicking	extinct 1947	first Baronet was given a new patent in 1920; this creation is still extant
Hicking of Southwell	1920	Hicking, North	extant	first Baronet had already been created a Baronet in 1917, which title became extinct in 1947
Hickman of Wightwick	1903	Hickman	extant	
Hill of Bradford	1917	Hill	extant	
Hill of Green Place	1919	Hill	extinct 1944	
Hill-Wood of Moorfield	1921	Hill-Wood	extant	
Hillary of Danbury Place and Rigg House	1805	Hillary	extinct 1854	
Hills of Hills Court	1939	Hills	extinct 1955	
Hindley of Meads	1927	Hindley	extinct 1963	first Baronet created Viscount Hyndley in 1948
Hingley of Hatherton Lodge	1893	Hingley	extinct 1918	
Hirst of Witton	1925	Hirst	extinct 1943	first Baronet created Baron Hirst in 1934
Hislop of Tothill	1813	Hislop	extinct 1843	
Hoare of Fleet Street	1962	Hoare	extinct 1986	Lord Mayor of London
Hoare of Sidestrand Hall, Cliff House and Heath House	1899	Hoare	extinct 1959	second Baronet created Viscount Templewood in 1944
Hobart of Langdown	1914	Hobart	extant	
Hobhouse of Chantry House and Westbury College	1812	Hobhouse	extant	second Baronet created Baron Broughton in 1859, which title became extinct in 1869
Hodge of Chipstead	1921	Hodge	extant	
Hogg of Upper Grosvenor Street	1846	Hogg	extant	second Baronet created Baron Magheramorne in 1887, which title became extinct in 1957; unproven (eighth Baronet died 2001) – under review
Holcroft of Eaton Mascott	1921	Holcroft	extant	
Holcroft of The Shrubbery	1905	Holcroft	extinct 1917	
Holden of Oakworth House	1893	Holden	extant	second Baronet created Baron Holden in 1908, which title became extinct in 1951
Holden of The Firs	1919	Holden	extant	
Holden of The Grange	1909	Holden	extinct 1965	
Holder of Pitmaston	1898	Holder	extant	
Holderness of Tadworth	1920	Holderness	extant	
Holland of Broughton	1907	Holland	extinct 1950	first Baronet created Baron Rotherham in 1910
Holland of Sandlebridge and Lower Brook Street	1853	Holland, Holland-Hibbert	extant	second Baronet created Viscount Knutsford in 1895
Holland of Westwell Manor	1917	Holland	extinct 1997	
Hollins of Greyfriars	1907	Hollins	extinct 1963	
Holt of Cheetham	1916	Holt	extinct 1968	
Holt of Liverpool	1935	Holt	extinct 1941	
Holyoake-Goodricke of Studley Castle	1835	Holyoake-Goodricke	extinct 1888	
Homan of Dunlum	1801	Homan	extinct 1852	
Home of Well Manor Farm	1813	Home	extinct 1853	
Honyman of Armadale and Greenway	1804	Honyman	extinct 1911	
Hood of Wimbledon	1922	Hood	dormant	second Baronet died 2005
Hooper of Tenterden	1962	Hooper	extinct 1987	
Hope of Kinnettles	1932	Hope	dormant	second Baronet died 1979
Hopkins of St Pancras	1929	Hopkins	extinct 1946	
Horder of Ashford	1923	Horder	extinct 1997	first Baronet created Baron Horder in 1933
Horlick of Stubbings Manor	1914	Horlick	extant	
Hornby of Brookhouse	1899	Hornby	extinct 1971	
Horne of Shackleford	1929	Horne	extant	
Horsbrugh-Porter of Merrion Square	1902	Horsbrugh-Porter	extant	
Horsfall of Hatfield	1909	Horsfall	extant	
Hoste of the Navy	1814	Hoste	extinct 1915	
Houldsworth of Reddish and Coodham	1887	Houldsworth	extant	
Houldsworth of Heckmondwicke	1956	Houldsworth	extinct 1990	
Houston, later Houston-Boswall of Blackadder	1836	Houston, Houston-Boswall	extant	
Houston of West Toxteth	1922	Houston	extinct 1926	
Howard of Bushey Park	1838	Howard	extinct 1873	
Howard of Great Rissington	1955	Howard	extant	Lord Mayor of London
Hoyle of Banney Royd	1922	Hoyle	extinct 1939	
Hozier of Newlands	1890	Hozier	extinct 1929	first Baronet created Baron Newlands in 1898
Hudson-Kinahan of Glenville, Wyckham and Marrion Square	1887	Hudson-Kinahan	extinct 1949	
Hudson of North Hackney	1942	Hudson	extinct 1956	
Hughes-Hunter of Plâs Gôch	1906	Hughes-Hunter	extinct 1951	
Hughes-Morgan of Manascin	1925	Hughes-Morgan	extant	
Hughes of Denford	1942	Hughes	extinct 1958	
Hulton of Downside	1921	Hulton	extinct 1925	
Hulton of Hulton Park	1905	Hulton	extinct 1993	
Hume-Williams of Ewhurst	1922	Hume-Williams	extinct 1980	
Humphery of Penton Lodge	1868	Humphery	extinct 1909	
Hunt of Cromwell Road	1892	Hunt	extinct 1904	
Hunter of London	1812	Hunter	extinct 1924	Lord Mayor of London
Huntington-Whiteley of Grimley	1918	Huntington-Whiteley	extant	
Huntingdon of The Clock House	1906	Huntingdon	extinct 1928	
Hutchison of Hardiston	1923	Hutchison	extinct 1972	Lord Provost of Edinburgh
Hutchison of Rossie	1956	Hutchison	extant	unproven (second Baronet died 1998)
Hutchison of Thurle	1939	Hutchison	extant	President of the Royal College of Physicians
Hyde of Birmingham	1922	Hyde	extinct 1942	

== I ==
Title	Date of creation	Surname	Current status	Notes
Imbert-Terry of Strete Ralegh	1917	Imbert-Terry	extant	
Ingilby of Ripley and Harrington	1866	Ingilby	extant	
Inglis of Milton Bryan	1801	Inglis	extinct 1855	
Ingram of the Bungalow and Swineshead Abbey	1893	Ingram	extant	
Innes of Lochalsh and Coxton	1819	Innes	extinct 1831	
Irving of Woodhouse	1809	Irving	extinct 1866	
Isherwood of Rugglewood	1921	Isherwood	extinct 1946	

== J ==
Title	Date of creation	Surname	Current status	Notes
Jackson of Arlsey	1815	Jackson	dormant	sixth Baronet died 1980
Jackson of Birkenhead	1869	Jackson, Mather-Jackson	extant	
Jackson of Fort Hill	1813	Jackson	extinct 1851	
Jackson of Stansted House	1902	Jackson	extant	
Jackson of Wandsworth	1935	Jackson	extinct 1937	
Jackson of Wimbledon	1913	Jackson	extant	
Jaffray of Edgehill	1931	Jaffray	extinct 1953	
Jaffray of Skilts and Park Grove	1892	Jaffray	extant	
James of Dublin	1823	James	extinct 1979	Lord Mayor of Dublin
Jameson of Down Street	1911	Jameson	extinct 1917	
Jardine of Castle Milk	1885	Jardine, Buchanan-Jardine	extant	
Jardine of Godalming	1916	Jardine	extant	
Jardine of Nottingham	1919	Jardine	extinct 1965	
Jarvis of Hascombe	1922	Jarvis	extinct 1965	
Jehanghir of Bombay	1908	Jehanghir	extant	
Jejeebhoy of Bombay	1857	Jejeebhoy	extant	
Jenks of Cheape	1932	Jenks	extant	Lord Mayor of London
Jenner of Harley Street	1868	Jenner	extinct 1954	
Jephcott of East Portlemouth	1962	Jephcott	extant	
Jephson-Norreys of Mallow	1838	Jephson-Norreys	extinct 1888	
Jephson of Spring Vale	1815	Jephson	extinct 1900	
Jervoise, later Clarke-Jervoise of Idsworth	1813	Jervoise, Clarke-Jervoise	extinct 1933	
Jessel of Ladham House	1883	Jessel	extant	
Jessel of Westminster	1917	Jessel	extinct 1990	first Baronet created Baron Jessel in 1924
Johnson-Ferguson of Springhall and Wiston	1906	Johnson-Ferguson	extant	
Johnson of Bath	1818	Johnson	dormant	sixth Baronet died 1986 – under review
Johnson of Dublin	1909	Johnson	extinct 1918	
Johnston of London	1916	Johnston	extinct 1933	Lord Mayor of London
Joicey of Chester-le-Street	1893	Joicey	extant	first Baronet created Baron Joicey in 1906
Jolliffe of Merstham	1821	Jolliffe	extant	first Baronet created Baron Hylton in 1866
Jones Brydges of Boultibrook	1807	Jones Brydges	extinct 1891	
Jones-Parry of Madryn Castle	1886	Jones-Parry	extinct 1891	
Jones of Cranmer Hall	1831	Jones, Lawrence-Jones	extant	
Jones of Pentower	1917	Jones	extinct 1952	
Jones of Rhyll	1926	Jones, Probyn-Jones	extinct 1951	
Jones of Treeton	1919	Jones	extant	
Joseph of Portsoken	1943	Joseph	dormant	Lord Mayor of London; second Baronet created a life peer as Baron Joseph in 1987, which title became extinct in 1994; second Baronet died 1994
Joseph of Stoke-on-Trent	1942	Joseph	extinct 1951	
Joynson-Hicks of Newick	1919	Joynson-Hicks	extant	first Baronet created Viscount Brentford in 1929
Joynson-Hicks of Newick	1956	Joynson-Hicks	extant	first Baronet succeeded as Viscount Brentford in 1958
Judkin-Fitzgerald of Lisheen	1801	Judkin-Fitzgerald	extinct or dormant 1917	

== K ==
Title	Date of creation	Surname	Current status	Notes
Kaberry of Adel-cum-Eccup	1960	Kaberry	extant	
Kay-Shuttleworth of Gawthorpe	1849	Kay-Shuttleworth	extant	second Baronet created Baron Shuttleworth in 1902
Watson, later Kay of East Sheen	1803	Watson, Kay	extinct 1918	
Kaye of Denby	1812	Kaye, Lister-Kaye	extant	
Kaye of Huddersfield	1923	Kaye	extant	
Keane of Belmont and Cappoquin	1801	Keane	extant	
Kearley of Wittingham	1908	Kearley	extant	first Baronet created Viscount Devonport in 1917
Kekewich of Peamore	1921	Kekewich	extinct 1932	
Kelk of Bentley Priory	1874	Kelk	extinct 1923	
Kellett of Lota Begg	1801	Kellett	dormant	fourth Baronet died 1966 – under review
Kennard of Hordle Cliff	1891	Kennard	extinct 1999	
Kennedy of Johnstown	1836	Kennedy	dormant	sixth Baronet died 1988. Note: An Edward Kennedy, presumably the father of the first Baronet of the 1836 creation, was gazetted a baronet, "of Johnstown Mount Kennedy in the County of Waterford", in October 1812. However, this creation does not appeared to have passed the Great Seal.
Kerr of Cambridge	1957	Kerr	extinct 1974	
Kerrison of Hoxne Hall	1821	Kerrison	extinct 1886	
Key of Thornbury and Denmark Hill	1831	Key	extinct 1932	Lord Mayor of London
Keyes of Dover	1919	Keyes	extant	first Baronet created Baron Keyes in 1943
Kimber of Lansdown Lodge	1904	Kimber	extant	
King of Campsie	1888	King	extant	Lord Provost of Glasgow
King of Charlestown	1815	King	extant	
King of Cornwall Gardens	1932	King	extinct 1933	
King of Corrard and Bloomsbury	1821	King	extinct 1921	
Kinloch-Cooke of Brighthelmstone	1926	Kinloch-Cooke	extinct 1944	
Kinloch of Kinloch	1873	Kinloch	extant	
Kitson of Gledhowe Hall	1886	Kitson	extinct 1996	first Baronet created Baron Airedale in 1907
Kleinwort of Bolnore	1909	Kleinwort	extant	
Knighton of Carlston	1813	Knighton	extinct 1885	
Knill of The Grove and Fresh Wharf	1893	Knill	extant	Lord Mayor of London
Knott of Close House	1917	Knott	extinct 1949	
Knowles of Westwood	1903	Knowles	extinct 1928	
Knox-Gore of Belleek Manor	1868	Knox-Gore	extinct 1890	
Powell, later Kynaston of Hardwick	1818	Powell, Kynaston	extinct 1866	
Kyrle-Money of Hom House, Whetham and Pitsford	1838	Kyrle-Money	extinct 1843	

== L ==
Title	Date of creation	Surname	Current status	Notes
La Fontaine of Montreal	1854	La Fontaine	extinct 1867	
Lacon of Great Yarmouth	1818	Lacon	extant	
Lacy of Ampton	1921	Lacy	extant	
Laffan of Otham	1828	Laffan	extinct 1848	
Lakin of The Cliff	1909	Lakin	extant	
Laking of Kensington	1902	Laking	extinct 1930	
Lambart of Beau Parc	1911	Lambart	extinct 1986	
Lamont of Knockdaw	1910	Lamont	extinct 1949	
Lampson of Rowfant	1866	Lampson	extant	inherited by the second Baron Killearn in 1971
Lane of Cavendish Square	1913	Lane	extinct 1972	
Langman of Eaton Square	1906	Langman	extinct 1985	
Larcom of Brandeston	1868	Larcom	extinct 2004	
Larpent of Roehampton	1841	Larpent	extinct 1899	
Latham of Crow Clump	1919	Latham	extant	
Latta of Portman Square	1920	Latta	extinct 1946	
Laurie of Sevenoaks	1942	Laurie	extinct 1954	Lord Mayor of London
Lawes of Rothamsted	1882	Lawes	extant	
Lawrence of Sloane Gardens	1906	Lawrence	extant	
Lawrence of Ealing Park and Whitehall Place	1867	Lawrence	extant	
Lawrence of Lucknow	1858	Lawrence	extant	unproven (sixth Baronet died 1999) – under review
Lawrence of the Army	1858	Lawrence	extinct 14 August 2023	first Baronet created Baron Lawrence in 1869
Lawrence of Westbourne Terrace	1869	Lawrence	extinct 1897	Lord Mayor of London
Lawson of Brayton	1831	Lawson	extinct 1959	
Lawson of Brough Hall	1841	Lawson, Howard-Lawson	extant	
Lawson of Knavesmire Lodge	1905	Lawson	extinct 1973	
Lawson of Westwood Grange	1900	Lawson	extant	
Layland-Barratt of Torquay	1908	Layland-Barratt	extinct 1968	
Le Marchant of Chobham Place	1841	Le Marcham	extant	
Lea of The Larches and Sea Grove	1892	Lea	extant	
Lechmere of Hanley Castle	1818	Lechmere	extant	
Lee of Lukyns	1941	Lee	extinct 1967	
Leeds of Croxton Park	1812	Leeds	extant	
Lees of Black Rock	1804	Lees	extant	
Lees of Longendale	1937	Lees	extant	
Lees of Lytchet Manor	1897	Lees	extant	
Leese of Worfield	1908	Leese	dormant	fourth Baronet died 1979
Leigh of Altrincham	1918	Leigh	extant	
Leigh of Whitley	1814	Leigh	extinct 1844	
Leighton	1886	Leighton	extinct 1896	first Baronet created Baron Leighton in 1896
Leith of Newcastle	1919	Leith	extinct 1956	
Lennard of Wickham Court	1880	Lennard	extinct 1980	
Leon of Bletchley Park	1911	Leon	extant	
Leslie of Glasslough	1876	Leslie	extant	
Lethbridge of Westway House, Winkley Court and Sandhill Park	1804	Lethbridge	extant	
Lett of Walmer	1941	Lett	extinct 1964	
Lever of Allerton	1920	Lever	extinct 1947	
Lever of Hans Crescent	1911	Lever	extant	
Lever of Hulme	1911	Lever	extinct 2000	first Baronet created Viscount Leverhulme in 1922
Levy-Lawson of Hall Barn and Peterborough Court	1892	Levy-Lawson, Lawson	extant	first Baronet created Baron Burnham in 1903; second Baron created Viscount Burnham in 1919, which title became extinct in 1933
Levy of Humberstone Hall	1913	Levy	extinct 1996	
Lewis of Hyde Park Gate	1887	Lewis	extinct 1893	
Lewis of Essendon	1918	Lewis	extinct 1978	first Baronet created Baron Essendon in 1932
Lewis of Harpton Court	1846	Lewis	extinct 1911	
Lewis of Portland Place	1902	Lewis	extinct 1945	
Lewis of Nantgwyne	1896	Lewis	dormant	first Baronet created Baron Merthyr in 1911; third Baron and third Baronet died 1977
Lewthwaite of Broadgate	1927	Lewthwaite	extinct 2004	
Ley of Lazonby Hall	1905	Ley	extant	
Lindsay-Hogg of Rotherfield	1905	Lindsay-Hogg	extant	
Lindsay of Dowhill	1962	Lindsay	extant	unproven (second Baronet died 2005) – under review
Lipton of Osidge	1902	Lipton	extinct 1931	
Lister of Lyme Regis	1883	Lister	extinct 1912	first Baronet created Baron Lister in 1897
Lithgow of Ormsary	1925	Lithgow	extant	
Llewellyn of Baglan	1959	Llewellyn	dormant	second Baronet died 1994
Llewellyn of Bwllfa	1922	Llewellyn	extant	
Lloyd of Bromwydd	1863	Lloyd	extinct 1933	
Lloyd of Lancing	1831	Lloyd	extinct 1844	
Lloyd of Rhu	1960	Lloyd	extant	
Lockhart of Lee and Carnwath	1806	Lockhart	extinct 1919	
Locock of Speldhurst and Hertford Street	1857	Locock	extinct 1965	
Loder of Whittlebury and High Beeches	1887	Loder	extant	
Longman of Windlesham	1909	Longman	extinct 1940	
Lonsdale of Pavilion	1911	Lonsdale	extinct 1924	first Baronet created Baron Armaghdale in 1918
Lopes of Maristow House	1805	Lopes	extant	fourth Baronet created Baron Roborough in 1938
Louis of Chelston	1806	Louis	extinct 1949	
Low of Kilmaron	1908	Low, Low-Morrison	extant	
Lowe of Edgbaston	1918	Lowe	extant	
Lowson of Westlaws	1951	Lowson	extant	Lord Mayor of London
Lowther of Belgrave Square	1914	Lowther	extinct 1916	
Lowther of Swillington	1824	Lowther	extant	
Lubbock of London	1806	Lubbock	extant	fourth Baronet created Baron Avebury in 1900
Lucas-Tooth of Queen's Gate and Kameruka	1906	Lucas-Tooth	extinct 1918	
Lucas of Ashtead Park and Lowestoft	1887	Lucas	dormant	fourth Baronet died 1980
Lumsden of Auchindour	1821	Lumsden	extinct 1821	
Lusk of Colney Park	1874	Lusk	extinct 1909	Lord Mayor of London
Lyell of Kinnordy	1864	Lyell	extinct 1875	
Lyell of Kinnordy	1894	Lyell	extant	first Baronet created Baron Lyell in 1914
Lyle of Glendelvin	1929	Lyle	extant	
Lyle of Greenock	1915	Lyle	extinct 1923	
Lyle of Canford Cliffs	1932	Lyle	extinct 1976	first Baronet created Baron Lyle of Westbourne in 1945
Lyons of Christchurch	1840	Lyons	extinct 1887	first Baronet created Baron Lyons in 1856; second Baron created Viscount Lyons in 1881
Lyons of Grateley	1937	Lyons	extinct 1963	first Baronet created Baron Ennisdale in 1939
Lytton of Knebworth	1838	Lytton	extant	first Baronet created Baron Lytton in 1866, second Baron created Earl of Lytton in 1880

== M ==
Title	Date of creation	Surname	Current status	Notes
Macalister of Tarbert	1924	Macalister	extinct 1934	
Macara of Ardmore	1911	Macara	extant	
MacCormac of Harley Street	1897	MacCormac	extinct 1901	
Macdonald of East Sheen	1813	Macdonald	extinct 1919	
Macdonnell of Kilsharvan	1872	Macdonnell	extinct 1875	
MacGregor of Ballimore	1828	MacGregor	extant	
Mackenzie of Glen Muick	1890	Mackenzie	dormant	fourth Baronet died 1993 – under review
Mackenzie of Kilcoy	1836	Mackenzie	extinct 1883	
Mackeson of Hythe	1954	Mackeson	extant	
Mackie of Corraith	1920	Mackie	extinct 1924	
Mackinnon of Strathaird and Loup	1889	Mackinnon	extinct 1893	
Mackintosh of Halifax	1935	Mackintosh	extant	first Baronet created Viscount Mackintosh of Halifax in 1957
Mackintosh of Mackintosh	1812	Mackintosh	extinct 1820	
Mackworth-Praed of Owsden Hall	1905	Mackworth-Praed	extinct 1921	
Maclay of Glasgow	1914	Maclay	extant	first Baronet created Baron Maclay in 1922
Maclean of Strachur and Glensluain	1957	Maclean	extant	
Macleod of The Fairfields	1925	Macleod	extant	
Macleod of Fuinary	1924	Macleod	extant	
Maclure of Headbourne Worthy	1898	Maclure	extant	
Macmaster of Glengarry	1921	Macmaster	extinct 1922	
Macnab of Dundurn Castle	1858	Macnab	extinct 1862	
Macnaghten of Dundarave	1836	Workman-Macnaghten, Macnaghten	extant	
Macnaghten	1836	Macnaghten	extinct 1841	
Macpherson-Grant of Ballindalloch and Invereshie	1838	Macpherson-Grant	extinct 1983	
Macpherson of Banchor	1933	Macpherson	extant	first Baronet created Baron Invernairn in 1933
Macready of Cheltenham	1923	Macready	extant	
MacRobert of Douneside	1922	MacRobert	extinct 1941	
Mactaggart of King's Park	1938	Mactaggart	extant	
Madden of Kells	1919	Madden	extant	Unproven
Madge of St Margaret's Bay	1919	Madge	extinct 1962	
Magnay of Postford House	1844	Magnay	extinct 1960	Lord Mayor of London
Magnus of Tangley Hill	1917	Magnus	extant	
Mahon of Castlegar	1819	Mahon	extant	
Mainwaring of Over Peover	1804	Mainwaring	extinct 1934	
Maitland of Clifton Hall	1818	Maitland	dormant	tenth Baronet died 1994
Makins of Oxford	1903	Makins	extinct 1999	
Mallaby-Deeley of Mitcham Court	1922	Mallaby-Deeley	extinct 1962	
Mallinson of Walthamstow	1935	Mallinson	extant	
Mancroft of Mancroft	1932	Mancroft	extant	first Baronet created Baron Mancroft in 1932
Mander of The Mount	1911	Mander	extant	See Mander family
Mann of Thelveton Hall	1905	Mann	extant	
Manningham-Buller of Dilhorne Hall	1866	Manningham-Buller	extant	fourth Baronet created Viscount Dilhorne in 1964
Maple of Childwick Bury	1897	Maple	extinct 1903	
Mappin of Thornbury	1886	Mappin	extinct 1975	
Marjoribanks of Guisachan	1866	Marjoribanks	extinct 1935	first Baronet created Baron Tweedmouth in 1881
Marjoribanks of Lees	1815	Marjoribanks	extinct 1888	
Markham of Arusha	1911	Markham	extant	
Marling of Stanley Park	1882	Marling	extant	
Marr of Sunderland	1919	Marr	extant	
Marsden of Grimsby	1924	Marsden	extant	
Marsh of Dublin	1839	Marsh	extinct 1860	
Martin of Cappagh	1885	Martin	extinct 1901	
Martin of Overbury Court	1905	Martin	extinct 1916	
Mason of Compton Pauncefoot	1918	Mason	extinct 1988	first Baronet created Baron Blackford in 1935
Matheson of Lochalsh	1882	Matheson	extant	
Matheson of the Lews and Achany	1850	Matheson	extinct 1878	
Mathews of London	1917	Mathews	extinct 1920	
Mathias of Vaendre Hall	1917	Mathias	extinct 1991	
Constable-Maxwell-Scott of Abbotsford	1932	Constable-Maxwell-Scott	extinct 1954	
Maxwell of Cardonoss	1804	Maxwell	extinct 1924	
May of The Eyot	1931	May	extant	first Baronet created Baron May in 1935
McAlpine of Knott Park	1918	McAlpine	extant	fifth Baronet had already been created a life peer as Baron McAlpine of Moffat in 1980, before succeeding to the Baronetcy in 1983; the life peerage became extinct on his death in 1990
McClure of Belmont	1874	McClure	extinct 1893	
McConnell of The Moat	1900	McConnell	extant	Lord Mayor of Belfast
McCowan of Dalwhat	1934	McCowan	dormant	second Baronet died 1965
McCullagh of Lismarra	1935	McCullagh	extinct 1974	
McEwen of Marchmont and Bardrochat	1953	McEwen	extant	
McFarland of Aberfoyle	1914	McFarland	extant	
McGrigor of Campden Hill	1831	McGrigor	extant	
McIver of Sarisbury	1896	McIver	extinct 1920	
McKenny	1831	McKenny	extinct 1866	
McLaren of Bodnant, Gwylgre and Hilders	1902	McLaren	extant	first Baronet created Baron Aberconway in 1911; baronetcy unproven (third Baronet died 2003) – under review
McLintock of Sanquhar	1934	McLintock	extant	
McMahon of Ashley Manor	1817	McMahon	extant	
McMahon of Dublin	1815	McMahon	extinct 1926	
MacTaggart-Stewart of Southwick and Blairderry	1892	MacTaggart-Stewart	extinct 1948	
McTaggart of Ardwell	1841	McTaggart	extinct 1867	
Medlycott of Ven House	1808	Medlycott	extant	
Mellor of Culmhead	1924	Mellor	extinct 1990	
Melvin of Olton	1933	Melvin	extinct 1952	
Meredith of Montreal	1916	Meredith	extinct 1929	
Metcalfe of Chilton	1802	Metcalfe	extinct 1979	third Baronet created Baron Metcalfe in 1845, which title became extinct in 1846
Methuen of Haslemere	1916	Methuen	extinct 1924	
Meux of Theobald's Park	1831	Meux	extinct 1900	
Meyer of Shortgrove	1910	Meyer	extant	
Meyrick of Bush	1880	Meyrick	extant	unproven (fourth Baronet died 2004)
Meysey-Thompson of Kirby Hall	1874	Meysey-Thompson	dormant	second Baronet created Baron Knaresborough in 1905, which title became extinct in 1920; third Baronet died 1967
Micklethwait of Iridge Place	1838	Micklethwait	extinct 1853	
Middlebrook of Oakwell	1930	Middlebrook	extinct 1971	
Middlemore of Selly Oak	1919	Middlemore	extinct 1987	
Middleton of Crowfield	1804	Middleton	extinct 1860	
Milbank of Barningham Park	1882	Milbank	extant	
Milburn of Guyzance	1905	Milburn	extant	
Miles of Leigh Court	1859	Miles	extant	
Millais of Downgate	1885	Millais	extant	
Miller of Manderston	1874	Miller	extinct 1918	
Mills of Alcester	1953	Mills	extant	first Baronet created Viscount Mills in 1962
Mills of Ebbw Vale	1921	Mills	extant	
Mills of Hillingdon Court and Camelford House	1868	Mills	extinct 1982	second Baronet created Baron Hillingdon in 1887
Milne-Watson of Ashley	1937	Milne-Watson	extant	
Milne of Inveresk	1876	Milne	extinct 1938	
Milnes of Gauley	1801	Milnes	extinct 1841	
Mitchell-Thomson of Polmood	1900	Mitchell-Thomson	extant	Lord Provost of Edinburgh; second Baronet created Baron Selsdon in 1932
Mitchell of Tulliallan	1945	Mitchell	extinct 1983	
Mitchelson of Rotherfield	1920	Mitchelson	extinct 1945	
Moir of Whitehanger	1916	Moir	extant	
Molony of Dublin	1925	Molony	dormant	second Baronet died in 1976
Moncreiff of Tullibole	1871	Moncreiff	extant	first Baronet created Baron Moncreiff in 1874; in 1883 he also succeeded to the Moncreiff Baronetcy of Moncreiff, created in the Baronetage of Nova Scotia in 1685. Baronetcy unproven (5th baronet died 2002) – under review
Mond of Hartford Hill	1910	Mond	extant	first Baronet created Baron Melchett in 1928
Monro of Bearcrofts	1920	Monro	extinct 1928	
Monson of Thatched House Lodge	1905	Monson	extinct 1969	
Montagu of Swaythling	1894	Montagu	extant	first Baronet created Baron Swaythling in 1907
Montefiore of the Isle of Thanet	1846	Montefiore	extinct 1885	
Montefiore of Worth Park	1886	Montefiore	extinct 1935	
Montgomery of Stanhope	1801	Montgomery	extant	
Montgomery of The Hall	1808	Montgomery	extinct 1939	
Moon of Copsewood Grange	1887	Moon	dormant	fourth Baronet died 1979 – under review
Moore of Colchester	1923	Moore	extinct 1992	Lord Mayor of London
Moore of Hancox	1919	Moore	extant	President of the Royal College of Physicians
Moore of Kyleburn	1956	Moore	extinct 1971	
Moore of Moore Lodge	1932	Moore	extant	
Morgan of Green Street and Lincoln's Inn	1892	Morgan	extinct 1897	
Morgan of Whitehall Court	1906	Morgan	extinct 1916	Lord Mayor of London
Morris of Cavendish Square	1909	Morris	extinct 1926	
Morris of Clasemont	1806	Morris	dormant	ninth Baronet died 1982
Morris of Spiddal	1885	Morris	extant	first Baronet created Baron Killanin in 1900
Morris of Nuffield	1929	Morris	extinct 1963	first Baronet created Viscount Nuffield in 1938
Morrison-Bell of Harpford	1923	Morrison-Bell	extinct 1956	
Morrison-Bell of Otterburn Hall	1905	Morrison-Bell	extant	
Mott of Ditchling	1930	Mott	extant	
Mount of Wasing	1921	Mount	extant	
Mountain of Oare	1922	Mountain	extant	
Mowat of Cleckheaton	1932	Mowat	extinct 1968	
Mowbray of Mortimer	1880	Mowbray	extinct 2022	
Moynihan of Leeds	1922	Moynihan	extant	first Baronet created Baron Moynihan in 1929
Muir-Mackenzie of Delvine	1805	Muir-Mackenzie	extant	
Muir of Deanston and Park Gardens	1892	Muir	dormant	Lord Provost of Glasgow; third Baronet died 1995
Mulholland of Ballyscullion Park	1945	Mulholland	extant	second Baronet succeeded as Baron Dunleath in 1993
Munro-Lucas-Tooth of Bught	1920	Munro-Lucas-Tooth, Lucas-Tooth	extant	
Munro of Lindertis	1825	Munro	extant	
Muntz of Clifton-on-Dunsmore	1902	Muntz	extinct 1940	
Murchison of Belgrave Square	1866	Murchison	extinct 1871	
Murphy of Altadore	1903	Murphy	extinct 1922	
Murphy of Wyckham	1912	Murphy	extinct 1963	
Musgrave of Drumglass	1897	Musgrave	extinct 1904	
Musgrove of Speldhurst and Russell Square	1851	Musgrove	extinct 1881	Lord Mayor of London
Muspratt of Merseyside	1922	Muspratt	extinct 1934	
Myers	3 July 1804	Myers	extinct 1811	
Mynors of Treago	1964	Mynors	extant	

== N ==
Title	Date of creation	Surname	Current status	Notes
Nagle of Jamestown	1813	Nagle	extinct 1850	
Nairn of Rankeillour and Dysart House	1904	Nairn	extant	
Nairne of Kirkcudbright	1917	Nairne	extinct 1945	
Nall-Cain of The Node	1921	Nall-Cain	extant	first Baronet created Baron Brocket in 1933
Nall of Hoveringham Hall	1954	Nall	extant	
Napier of Merrion Square	1867	Napier	extant	
Naylor-Leyland of Hyde Park House	1895	Naylor-Leyland	extant	
Neal of Cherry Hinton	1931	Neal	extinct 1942	Lord Mayor of London
Neeld of Grittleton House	1859	Neeld	extinct 1941	
Nelson of Acton Park	1912	Nelson	dormant	third Baronet died in 1991
Nelson of Stafford	1955	Nelson	extant	first Baronet created Baron Nelson of Stafford in 1960
Nepean of Loders and Bothenhampton	1802	Nepean	extinct 2002	
Neville of Sloley	1927	Neville	extinct 1994	
Newman of Mamhead	1836	Mamhead	extant	fourth Baronet created Baron Mamhead in 1931, which title became extinct in 1945
Neumann, later Newman of Newmarket	1912	Neumann, Newman	extant	
Newnes of Wildcroft, Hollerday Hill and Hesketh House	1895	Newnes	extinct 1955	
Newson-Smith of Totteridge	1944	Newson-Smith	extant	Lord Mayor of London
Newson of Framlingham	1921	Newson	extinct 1950	
Newton of Beckenham	1924	Newton	extant	Lord Mayor of London
Newton of "The Wood" and Kottingham House	1900	Newton	extant	Lord Mayor of London
Nicholson of Kensington	1912	Nicholson	extant	
Nicholson of Luddenham	1859	Nicholson	extinct 1986	
Nicholson of Winterbourne Roy	1958	Nicholson	extinct 1958	
Nivison of Sanquhar	1914	Nivison	extant	first Baronet created Baron Glendyne in 1922
Nixon of Roebuck Grove and Merrion Square	1906	Nixon	extant	
Noble of Ardkinglass	1923	Noble	extant	
Noble of Ardmore	1902	Noble	extant	
Noble of West Denton Hall	1921	Noble	extinct 1935	first Baronet created Baron Kirkley in 1930
Norie-Miller of Cleeve	1936	Norie-Miller	extinct 1973	
Norman of Honeyhanger	1915	Norman	extant	
Northcote of Seamore Place	1887	Northcote	extinct 1911	first Baronet created Baron Northcote in 1900
Norton-Griffiths of Wonham	1922	Norton-Griffiths	extant	
Humble, later Nugent of Cloncoskoran	1831	Humble, Nugent	extinct 1929	
Nugent of Donore	1831	Nugent	extant	
Nugent of Dunsfold	1960	Nugent	dormant	first Baronet created a life peer as Baron Nugent of Guildford in 1966; first Baronet died 1994
Nugent of Portaferry	1961	Nugent	extinct 1962	
Nugent of Waddesdon	1806	Nugent	extant	
Nussey of Rushwood Hall	1909	Nussey	extinct 1971	
Nuttall of Chasefield	1922	Nuttall	extant	
Nutting of St Helens	1903	Nutting	extant	

== O ==
Title	Date of creation	Surname	Current status	Notes
O'Brien of Ardtona	1916	O'Brien	extinct 1916	first Baronet created Baron Shandon in 1918
O'Brien of Kilfenora	1891	O'Brien	extinct 1914	first Baronet created Baron O'Brien in 1900
O'Brien of Merrion Square and Borris-in-Ossory	1849	O'Brien	dormant	Lord Mayor of Dublin; sixth Baronet died 1982
O'Loghlen of Drumcanora	1838	O'Loghlen	extant	
O'Malley of Rosehill	1804	O'Malley	extinct 1892	
O'Connell of Lakeview	1869	O'Connell	extant	
O'Neill of Cleggan	1929	O'Neill	extant	first Baronet created Baron Rathcavan in 1953
Oakes of Hereford	1815	Oakes	extinct 1927	first Baronet had already been created a Baronet in 1813, which creation became extinct in 1822
Oakes of Nassau	1939	Oakes	extant	
Oakes of the Army	1813	Oakes	extinct 1822	first Baronet obtained a new patent in 1815, which creation became extinct in 1927
Oakshott	1959	Oakshott	extant	first Baronet created a life peer as Baron Oakshott in 1964, which title became extinct in 1975
Ochterlony of Ochterlony	1823	Ochterlony	extinct 1964	had already been created Baronet of Pitforthy in 1816, which title became extinct in 1825
Ochterlony of Pitforthy	1816	Ochterlony	extinct 1825	also created Baronet of Ochterlony in 1823, which title became extinct in 1964
Ogle of Worthy	1816	Ogle	extinct 1940	
Ohlson of Scarborough	1920	Ohlson	extant	
Oppenheimer of Stoke Poges	1921	Oppenheimer	extant	
Ormsby of Cloghans	1812	Ormsby	extinct 1833	
Orr-Ewing of Ballikinran	1886	Orr-Ewing	extant	
Orr-Ewing of Hendon	1963	Orr-Ewing	extant	first Baronet created a life peer as Baron Orr-Ewing in 1971, which title became extinct in 1999
Orr-Lewis of Whitewebbs Park	1920	Orr-Lewis	extinct 1980	
Osler of Norham Gardens	1911	Osler	extinct 1919	
Otway of Brighthelmstone	1831	Otway	extinct 1912	
Ouseley of Claremont	1808	Ouseley	extinct 1889	
Outram of The Bengal	1858	Outram	extant	
Owen of Orielton	1813	Owen	extinct 2002	

== P ==
Title	Date of creation	Surname	Current status	Notes
Paget of Cranmore Hall	1886	Paget	extant	
Paget of Harewood Place	1871	Paget	extant	
Paget of Sutton Bonington	1897	Paget	extinct 1936	
Pakington	1846	Pakington	extant	first Baronet created Baron Hampton in 1874; baronetcy unproven (6th baronet died 2003)
Palmer-Acland of Fairfield	1818	Palmer-Acland, Fuller-Palmer-Acland	extinct 1871	
Palmer of Grinkle Park	1886	Palmer	extant	
Palmer of Reading and Grosvenor Square	1904	Palmer	extinct 1910	
Palmer of Reading	1916	Palmer	extant	first Baronet created Baron Palmer in 1933
Parker of Carlton House Terrace	1915	Palmer	extinct 1932	
Parker of Shenstone	1844	Parker	extant	
Parry of Highnam Court	1902	Parry	extinct 1918	
Parsons of Winton Lodge	1918	Parsons	extinct 1940	
Paul of Rodborough	1821	Paul	extinct 1972	
Paulet of West Hill	1836	Paulet	extinct 1886	
Pauncefort-Duncombe of Great Brickhill	1859	Pauncefort-Duncombe	extant	
Paxton of Letham	1923	Paxton	extinct 1930	Lord Provost of Glasgow
Payne-Gallwey of Hampton Hill	1812	Payne-Gallwey	extinct 2008	
Peacocke of Barntic	1802	Peacocke	extinct 1876	
Pearce of Cardell	1887	Pearce	extinct 1907	
Pearson of Cowdray	1894	Pearson	extant	first Baronet created Viscount Cowdray in 1917
Pearson of Gressingham	1964	Pearson	extant	
Pearson of St Dunstans	1916	Pearson	extinct 1982	
Pease of Hammersknott	1920	Pease	extant	
Pease of Hutton Lowcross	1882	Pease	extant	
Peek of Rousdon	1874	Peek	extant	
Peel of Eyworth	1936	Peel	extinct 1938	
Peel of Tyersall Hall	1897	Peel	extinct 1911	
Pelly of Upton	1840	Pelly	extant	
Pender of Thornby Hall	1897	Pender	extinct 1921	
Pennefather of Golden	1924	Pennefather	extinct 1933	
Penny of Singapore and Kingston upon Thames	1933	Penny	extant	first Baronet created Viscount Marchwood in 1945
Pepys of London	1801	Pepys	extant	second Baronet created Earl of Cottenham in 1850; in 1849 he also succeeded to the Pepys Baronetcy of Juniper Hill (created in 1784)
Perks of Wykham Park	1908	Perks	extinct 1979	
Perring of Frensham Manor	1963	Perringham	extant	Lord Mayor of London
Perring of Membland	1808	Perring	extinct 1920	
Perrott of Plumstead	1911	Perrott	extinct 1922	first Baronet had already succeeded to the Perrott Baronetcy of Plumstead (created in the Baronetage of Great Britain in 1716), which title also became extinct in 1922.
Petit of Petit Hall	1890	Petit	extant	
Peto of Barnstaple	1927	Peto	extant	
Peto of Somerleyton Hall and Kensington Palace Gardens	1855	Peto	extant	
Petrie of Carrowcarden	1918	Petrie	extant	
Philipps of Llanstephan	1919	Philipps	extant	first Baronet created Baron Milford in 1939
Philipps of Picton Castle and Kilgetty Park	1828	Philipps	extinct 1857	first Baronet created Baron Milford in 1847
Philipps of Picton Castle	1887	Philipps	extinct 1962	
Philips of Weston and Sedgley	1828	Philips	extinct 1883	
Philipson-Stow of Lodsworth	1907	Philipson-Stow	extant	
Phillimore of Shiplake	1881	Phillimore	extant	second Baronet created Baron Phillimore in 1918
Phillipps of Middle Hall	1821	Philipps	extinct 1872	
Phillips of Tylney Hall	1912	Phillips	extinct 2026	
Pickthorn of Orford	1959	Pickthorn	extant	
Pigott of Knapton	1808	Pigott	extant	
Pilditch of Bartropps	1929	Pilditch	extant	
Pile of Chipperfield	1900	Pile	extant	Lord Mayor of Dublin;
Pinsent of Selly Hill	1938	Pinsent	extant	
Pirie of Camberwell	1842	Pirie	extinct 1851	Lord Mayor of London
Platt of Grindleford	1959	Platt	extant	President of the Royal College of Physicians; first Baronet created a life peer as Baron Platt in 1967, which title became extinct in 1978; unproven (second Baronet died 2000) – under review
Platt of Rusholme	1958	Platt	dormant	first Baronet died 1986
Plender of Ovenden	1923	Plender	extinct 1946	first Baronet created Baron Plender in 1931
Pocock of Hart and Twickenham	1821	Pocock	extinct 1921	
Poë of Heywood	1912	Poë, Poë-Domvile	extinct 1959	
Pole of the Navy	1801	Pole	extinct 1830	
Pollock of Edinburgh	1939	Pollock	extinct 1962	
Pollock of Hanworth	1922	Pollock	extant	first Baronet created Viscount Hanworth in 1936
Pollock of Hatton	1866	Pollock	extant	
Pollock of the Khyber Pass	1872	Pollock, Pollock-Montagu	extant	
Ponsonby of Wotton	1956	Ponsonby	extant	
Pooley of Westbrook House	1953	Pooley	extinct 1966	
Porritt of Hampstead	1963	Porritt	dormant	first Baronet created a life peer as Baron Porritt in 1973, which title became extinct in 1994; first Baronet died 1994
Portal of Laverstoke House	1901	Portal	extant	third Baronet created Viscount Portal in 1945, which title became extinct in 1949
Porter of Frimley	1889	Porter	extinct 1974	
Pottinger of Richmond	1840	Pottinger	extinct 1909	
Pound of Stanmore	1905	Pound	extant	Lord Mayor of London
Powell of Diss	1897	Powell	extant	
Powell of Horton Old Hall	1892	Powell	extinct 1911	
Power of Edermine	1841	Power	extinct 1930	
Power of Kilfane	1836	Power	dormant	seventh Baronet died 1928
Power of Newlands Manor	1924	Powlands	extant	
Poynter of Albert Gate	1902	Poynter	extinct 1968	
Prescott of Godmanchester	1938	Prescott	extant	
Preston of Beeston St Lawrence	1815	Preston	extant	unproven (seventh Baronet died 1999) – under review
Prevost of Belmont	1805	Prevost	extant	
Prevost of Westbourne Terrace	1903	Prevost	extinct 1913	
Price of Ardingley	1953	Price	extinct 1963	
Price of Foxley	1828	Price	extinct 1857	
Price of Spring Grove	1804	Price, Rugge-Price	extant	Lord Mayor of London
Price of Trengwainton	1815	Price	extant	
Prichard-Jones of Bron Menai	1910	Prichard-Jones	extant	
Priestman of Monkwearmouth	1934	Priestman	extinct 1941	
Primrose of Redholme	1903	Primrose	extant	Lord Provost of Glasgow
Prince-Smith of Hillbrook	1911	Prince-Smith	extinct 2007	
Proby of Elton Hall	1952	Proby	extant	
Pryce-Jones of Dolerw	1918	Pryce-Jones	extinct 1963	
Pryke of Wanstead	1926	Pryke	extant	Lord Mayor of London
Pryse of Gogerddan	1866	Pryse, Webley-Parry-Pryse, Saunders-Pryse	extinct 1962	
Puleston of Emral	1813	Puleston	extinct 1896	
Pulley of Lower Eaton and Piccadilly	1893	Pulley	extinct 1901	
Pybus of Harwick	1934	Pybus	extinct 1935	
Quain of Harley Street and Carrigoon	1891	Quain	extinct 1898	
Quilter of Bawdsey Manor	1897	Quilter	extant	

== R ==
Title	Date of creation	Surname	Current status	Notes
Radcliffe of Milnsbridge House	1813	Radcliffe	extant	
Rae of Esk Grove	1804	Rae	extinct 1842	
Raeburn of Helensburgh	1923	Raeburn	extant	
Ralli of Beaurepaire Park	1912	Ralli	extant	
Ramsay of Balmain	1806	Ramsay	extant	
Ramsay-Steel-Maitland of Sauchie	1917	Ramsay-Steel-Maitland	extinct 1965	
Ramsden of Birkenshaw	1938	Ramsden	extinct 1955	first Baronet created Baron Ramsden in 1945
Ranchhodlal of Shahpur	1913	Ranchhodlal	extant	
Rankin of Broughton Tower	1937	Rankin	extinct 1960	
Rankin of Bryngwyn	1898	Rankin	extant	
Raphael of Allestree Hall	1911	Raphael	extinct 1924	
Rasch of Woodhill	1903	Rasch	extant	
Rashleigh of Prideaux	1831	Rashleigh	extant	
Rawlinson of North Walsham	1891	Rawlinson	extant	
Rea of Eskdale	1935	Rea	extant	first Baronet created Baron Rea in 1937
Readhead of Westoe	1922	Readhead	extinct 1988	
Reardon-Smith of Appledore	1920	Reardon-Smith	extant	
Reckitt of Swanland Manor	1894	Reckitt	extinct 1944	
Redmayne of Rushcliffe	1964	Redmayne	extant	first Baronet created a life peer as Baron Redmayne in 1966, which title became extinct in 1983
Redwood of St Marylebone	1911	Redwood	extant	
Rees of Aylwards Chase	1919	Rees	extinct 1970	
Reid of the Chesnuts	1897	Reid	extant	Physician to the Queen
Reid of Ewell Grove	1823	Reid	extinct 1903	
Reid of Rademon	1936	Reid	extinct 1939	
Reid of Springburn	1922	Reid	extant	
Remnant of Wenhaston	1917	Remnant	extant	first Baronet created Baron Remnant in 1928
Renals of London	1895	Renals	extant	Lord Mayor of London
Renshaw of Coldharbour	1903	Renshaw	extant	
Renwick of Coombe	1927	Renwick	extant	second Baronet created Baron Renwick in 1964
Renwick of Newminster Abbey	1921	Renwick	extant	
Reynolds of Grosvenor Street	1895	Reynolds	extinct 1896	President of the Royal College of Physicians
Reynolds of Woolton	1923	Reynolds	extant	
Rhodes of Hollingworth	1919	Rhodes	extant	
Rhys-Williams of Miskin	1918	Rhys-Williams	extant	
Rich of Sunning	1863	Rich	extinct 1869	
Richardson of Eccleshall	1963	Richardson	extinct 2004	first Baronet created a life peer as Baron Richardson in 1979
Richardson of Weybridge	1929	Richardson	extinct 1981	
Richardson of Yellow Woods	1924	Richardson	extant	
Richmond of Hollington	1929	Richmond	dormant	second Baronet died 2000
Ricketts of Beaumont Lyes	1828	Ricketts	extant	
Riddell of Walton Heath	1918	Riddell	extinct 1934	first Baronet created Baron Riddell in 1920
Rigby of Long Durford	1929	Rigby	extant	
Ripley of Acacia	1897	Ripley	extinct 1954	
Ripley of Rawdon	1880	Ripley	extant	
Ritchie of Highlands and Queensborough Terrace	1903	Ritchie	extinct 1912	Lord Mayor of London
Ritchie of Lees House	1918	Ritchie	extinct 1991	
Rivett-Carnac of Derby	1836	Rivett-Carnac	extant	
Roberts of Abergele	1908	Roberts	extant	first Baronet created Baron Clwyd in 1919. Unproven.
Roberts of Brightfieldstown	1809	Roberts	extant	
Roberts of Eccleshall	1919	Roberts	extant	
Roberts of Martholme	1931	Roberts	extinct 1950	
Roberts of Milner Field	1909	Roberts	extant	
Roberts of the Army	1881	Roberts	extinct 1914	first Baronet created Baron Roberts of Kandahar in 1892, which title became extinct in 1914, and Earl Roberts in 1901, which title became extinct in 1955
Robertson of Beaconsfield	1919	Robertson	extant	second Baronet created Baron Robertson of Oakridge in 1961
Robinson of Batts House	1823	Robinson	extinct 1944	
Robinson of Hawthornden	1908	Robinson	extant	
Robinson, later Lynch-Robinson of Lisnacarrig	1920	Robinson, Lynch-Robinson	extant	
Robinson of Rokeby Hall	1819	Robinson	extinct 1910	
Robinson of Rosmead	1891	Robinson	extinct 1933	first Baronet created Baron Rosmead in 1896
Robinson of Toronto	1854	Robinson	dormant	seventh Baronet died 1988
Roche of Carass	1838	Roche	extant	
Rodgers of Groombridge	1964	Rodgers	extant	
Roe of Brundish	1836	Roe	extinct 1866	
Roll of Wanstead	1921	Roll	extinct 1998	Lord Mayor of London
Rolleston of Upper Brook Street	1924	Rolleston	extinct 1944	President of the Royal College of Physicians
Ropner of Preston Hall and Skutterskelfe Hall	1904	Ropner	extant	
Ropner of Thorp Perrow	1952	Ropner	extant	
Rose of Hardwick House	1909	Rose	extant	fourth Baronet succeeded to the Rose Baronetcy of Montreal (created 1872) in 1979
Rose of Leith	1935	Rose	extinct 1976	
Rose of Montreal and Queen's Gate	1872	Rose	extant	fifth Baronet had already succeeded to the Rose Baronetcy of Hardwick House (created in the Baronetage of the United Kingdom in 1909) in 1966 when he succeeded in 1979
Rose of Rayners	1874	Rose	dormant	third Baronet died 1982
Ross of Dunmoyle	1919	Ross	extinct 1958	
Ross of Whetstone	1960	Ross	extant	
Rothband of Higher Broughton	1923	Rothband	extinct 1940	
Rothschild of Grosvenor Place	1847	Rothschild	extant	second Baronet created Baron Rothschild in 1885
Rowland of Taunton	1950	Rowland	extinct 1970	Lord Mayor of London
Rowley of Hill House	1836	Rowley	extant	seventh Baronet succeeded to the Rowley Baronetcy of Tendring (created 1786) in 1997
Rowley of the Navy	1813	Rowley	extinct 1842	
Royce of Seaton	1930	Royce	extinct 1933	
Royden of Frankby	1905	Royden	extant	second Baronet created Baron Royden in 1944, which title became extinct in 1950
Ruggles-Brise of Spains Hall	1935	Ruggles-Brise	extant	
Runciman of Jesmond	1906	Runciman	extant	first Baronet created Baron Runciman in 1933; second Baron had already been created Viscount Runciman of Doxford when he succeeded to the Baronetcy and Barony in 1937
Cockerell, later Rushout of Sezincote	1809	Cockerell, Rushout	extinct 1931	
Russel of Charlton Park	1832	Russell	extinct 1915	
Russell of Littleworth Corner	1916	Russell	extant	
Russell of Olney	1917	Russell	extinct 1920	
Russell of Swallowfield	1812	Russell	dormant	sixth Baronet died 1964
Rutherford of Beardwood	1916	Rutherford	extinct 1932	
Rutherford of Liverpool	1923	Rutherford	extinct 1942	
Ryan of Hintlesham	1919	Ryan	extant	
Rylands of Thelwall	1939	Rylands	extinct 1948	

== S ==
Title	Date of creation	Surname	Current status	Notes
Salomons of Broom Hill and Great Cumberland Place	1869	Salomons, Goldsmid-Sterns-Salomons	extinct 1925	
Salt of Saltaire	1869	Salt	extant	
Salt of Weeping Cross	1899	Salt	extant	
Samman of Routh	1921	Samman	extinct 1960	
Samuel of Chelwood Vetchery	1912	Samuel	extinct 1926	
Samuel of the Mote and Portland Place	1903	Samuel	extant	Lord Mayor of London; first Baronet created Viscount Bearsted in 1925
Samuel of Nevern Square	1898	Samuel	extant	
Samuelson of Bodicote Grange and Prince's Gate	1884	Samuelson	extant	
Sandeman of Kenlygreen	1929	Sandeman	extinct 1940	
Sanders of Bayford	1920	Sanders	extinct 1950	first Baronet created Baron Bayford in 1929
Sanderson of Malling Deanery	1920	Sanderson	extant	
Sassoon of Bombay	1909	Sassoon	extinct 1931	
Sassoon of Kensington Gore and Eastern Terrace	1890	Sassoon	extinct 1939	
Savory of Buckhurst Park	1891	Savory	extinct 1921	Lord Mayor of London
Savory of The Woodland	1890	Savory	extinct 1961	
Scarisbrick of Greaves Hall	1909	Scarisbrick	extinct 1955	
Schroder of The Dell	1892	Schroder	extinct 1910	
Schuster of Collingham Road	1906	Schuster	extinct 1996	
Scott of Abbotsford	1820	Scott	extinct 1847	Author Sir Walter Scott
Scott of Beauclerc	1907	Scott	extant	
Scott of Connaught Place	1899	Scott	extinct 1912	
Sibbald, later Scott of Dunninald	1806	Sibbald, Scott	extinct 1945	
Scott of Great Barr	1806	Scott	dormant	third Baronet had already inherited the Bateman Baronetcy of Hartington Hall (created 1806) when he succeeded in 1851; in 1905 the Bateman Baronetcy was inherited by the fourth Fuller-Acland-Hood Baronet of St Audries; eighth Baronet died 1980 – under review
Scott of Lytchet Minster	1821	Scott	extinct 1961	
Scott of Rotherfield Park	1962	Scott	extant	
Scott of The Yews	1909	Scott	extant	
Scott of Witley	1913	Scott	extant	
Scotter of Eastbourne	1907	Scotter	extinct 1911	
Scourfield of the Mote and Williamston	1876	Scourfield	extinct 1921	
Seager of St Mellons	1952	Seager	dormant	first Baronet created Baron Leighton of St Mellons in 1962; first Baronet died 1963
Seale of Mount Boon	1838	Seale	extant	
Seaman of Bouverie Street	1933	Seaman	extinct 1936	
Seely of Sherwood Lodge and Brooke House	1896	Seely	extant	third Baronet created Baron Sherwood in 1941, which title became extinct in 1970
Selby-Bigge of King's Sutton	1919	Selby-Bigge	extinct 1973	
Seton-Steuart of Allanton	1815	Seton-Steuart	extinct 1930	
Seymour of High Mount and Friery Park	1809	Seymour, Culme-Seymour	extant	
Seymour of the Army	1869	Seymour	extinct 1949	
Shakerley of Somerford Park	1838	Shakerley	extant	
Shakespeare of Lakenham	1942	Shakespeare	extant	
Sharp of Heckmondwike	1920	Sharp	extant	
Sharp of Maidstone	1922	Sharp	extant	
Shaw of Bushy Park	1821	Shaw	extant	
Shaw of Kilmarnock	1809	Shaw	extinct 1843	Lord Mayor of London; first Baronet obtained a new patent in 1813 (see below); this creation became extinct in 1868
Shaw of Kilmarnock	1813	Shaw	extinct 1868	Lord Mayor of London; the first Baronet had already been created a Baronet in 1809, which title became extinct in 1843
Shaw of Wolverhampton	1908	Shaw	extinct 1942	
Sheaffe of Boston	1813	Sheaffe	extinct 1851	
Shelley-Sidney of Penshurst	1818	Shelley-Sidney, Sidney	extant	second Baronet created Baron de L'Isle and Dudley in 1835; the sixth Baron was created Viscount De L'Isle in 1956 and also inherited the Shelley Baronetcy of Castle Goring in 1965
Shelley of Castle Goring	1806	Shelley, Shelley-Rolls, Sidney	extant	inherited by the Viscount De L'Isle in 1956
Sheppard of Thornton Hall	1809	Sheppard	extinct 1848	
Shepperson of Upwood	1945	Shepperson	extinct 1949	
Shiffner of Coombe	1818	Shiffner	extant	
Silvester of Yardley	1815	Silvester	extinct 1822	first Baronet obtained a new patent in 1822, which creation became extinct in 1828
Silvester of Yardley	1822	Silvester	extinct 1828	first Baronet had already been created a Baronet in 1815, which creation became extinct in 1822
Simeon of Grazeley	1815	Simeon	extant	
Simpson of Bradley Hall	1935	Simpson	extinct 1981	
Simpson of Strathavon and Edinburgh	1866	Simpson	extinct 1924	
Sitwell of Renishaw	1808	Sitwell	extant	
Skinner of Chelsea	1912	Skinner	extant	
Slade of Maunsell Grange	1831	Slade	extant	
Sleight of Weelsby Hall	1920	Sleight	extant	
Smiley of Alton	1903	Smiley	extant	
Smith of Aliwal	1846	Smith	extinct 1860	
Smith of Birkenhead	1918	Smith	extinct 1985	first Baronet created Earl of Birkenhead in 1922
Smith of Colwyn Bay	1912	Smith	extant	first Baronet created Baron Colwyn in 1917
Smith of Crowmallie	1945	Smith	extant	
Smith of Eardistown	1809	Smith	dormant	fifth Baronet died 2000
Smith of Jamaica	1838	Smith, Smith-Gordon	dormant	fourth Baronet died 1976 – under review
Smith of Keighley	1947	Smith, Bracewell-Smith	extant	Lord Mayor of London
Smith of Kidderminster	1920	Smith	extinct 1961	
Smith of Pickering	1821	Smith	extinct 1837	
Smith of Stratford Place	1897	Smith	extant	
Smith of Tring Park	1804	Smith, Hamilton-Spencer-Smith	extant	
Smyth of Ashton Court	1859	Smyth	extinct 1901	
Smyth of Teignmouth	1956	Smyth	extant	
Snadden of Coldock	1955	Snadden	extinct 1959	
Southby of Burford	1937	Southby	extant	
Spearman of Hanwell	1840	Spearman	extant	
Spears of Warfield	1953	Spears	extinct 1974	
Spencer-Nairn of Monimail	1933	Spencer-Nairn	extant	
Speyer of Grosvenor Street	1906	Speyer	extinct 1932	
Spicer of Lancaster Gate	1906	Spicer	extant	
Sprot of Garnkirk	1918	Sprot	extinct 1929	
St Aubyn of St Michael's Mount	1866	St Aubyn	extant	second Baronet created Baron St Levan in 1887
St Paul of Ewart Park	1813	St Paul	extinct 1891	
Stafford of Rockingham	1914	Stafford, Stafford-King-Harman	extinct 1987	
Stamer of Beauchamp	1809	Stamer	extant	Lord Mayor of Dublin
Stanhope of Stanwell	1807	Stanhope	extinct 1952	third Baronet succeeded as Earl of Chesterfield in 1883
Stanier of Peplow Hall	1917	Stanier	extant	
Starkey of Norwood Park	1935	Starkey	extant	
Steel of Murieston	1903	Steel	extinct 1904	Lord Provost of Edinburgh
Stephen of de Vere Gardens	1891	Stephen	extinct 1987	
Stephen of Montreal	1886	Stephen	extinct 1921	first Baronet created Baron Mount Stephen in 1891
Stephenson of Hassop Hall	1936	Stephenson	dormant	second Baronet died 1982
Stern of Chertsey	1922	Stern	extinct 1933	
Stern of Hellingly	1905	Stern	extinct 1984	first Baronet created Baron Michelham in 1905
Stevenson of Clevedon	1914	Stevenson	extinct 1944	Lord Provost of Glasgow
Stevenson of Walton Heath	1917	Stevenson	extinct 1926	first Baronet created Baron Stevenson in 1924
Stewart-Clark of Dundas	1918	Stewart-Clark	extant	
Stewart of Athenree	1803	Stewart	extant	
Stewart of Balgownie	1920	Stewart	extant	Lord Provost of Glasgow
Stewart of Fingask	1920	Stewart	extant	
Stewart of South Kensington	1881	Stewart	extinct 1951	
Stewart of Stewartby	1937	Stewart	extant ?	
Stewart of Strathgarry	1960	Stewart	extant	
Stockdale of Hoddington	1960	Stockdale	extant	Lord Mayor of London
Stockenström of Maas Ström	1840	Stockenström	extinct 1957	
Stoker of Hatch Street	1911	Stoker	extinct 1912	
Stokes of Lensfield Cottage	1889	Stokes	extinct 1916	
Storey of Settrington	1960	Storey	extant	first Baronet created a life peer as Baron Buckton in 1966, which title became extinct in 1978
Stott of Stanton	1920	Stott	extant	
Stracey of Rackheath Park	1818	Stracey	extant	
Strachey of Sutton Court	1801	Strachey	dormant	fourth Baronet created Baron Strachie in 1911, which title became extinct in 1971; fifth Baronet died 1973
Strang-Steel of Philiphaugh	1938	Strang-Steel	extant	
Stronge of Tynan	1803	Stronge	dormant	Dormant. 8th Bt died 1981.
Stuart-Menteth of New Cumnock	1838	Stuart-Menteth	extant	
Stuart-Taylor of Kennington	1917	Stuart-Taylor	extant	President of the Royal College of Physicians
Stuart of Oxford	1841	Stuart	extinct 1915	
Stucley of Affeton Castle and Hartland Abbey	1859	Stucley	extant	
Studd of Netheravon	1929	Studd	extant	Lord Mayor of London
Studholme of Perridge	1956	Studholme	extant	
Sturdee of the Falkland Islands	1916	Sturdee	extinct 1970	
Sullivan of Garryduff	1881	Sullivan	extinct 1937	Master of the Rolls in Ireland
Sullivan of Thames Ditton	1804	Sullivan	extant	
Summers of Sholton	1952	Summers	extinct 1993	
Sutherland of Dunstanburgh Castle	1921	Sutherland	extant	
Sutton of Beckenham	1922	Sutton	extinct 1934	
Sutton of Castle House	1919	Sutton	extinct 1947	
Sutton of Moulsey	1806	Sutton	extinct 1813	
Schwann, later Swann of Princes Gardens	1906	Schwann, Swann	extant	
Sykes of Cheadle	1918	Sykes	extinct 1950	
Sykes of Kingsknowes	1921	Sykes	extant	
Synge of Kiltrough	1801	Synge	extant	

== T ==
Title	Date of creation	Surname	Current status	Notes
Tangye of Glendorgal	1912	Tangye	extinct 1969	
Tarleton of Liverpool	1816	Tarleton	extinct 1833	
Tate of Trefnant	1898	Tate	extant	
Tatem of St Fagans	1916	Tatem	extinct 1942	first Baronet created Baron Glanely in 1918
Taylor of Cawthorne	1963	Taylor	extinct 1972	
Taylor of Hollycombe	1828	Taylor	extinct 1876	
Tempest of Broughton Hall	1841	Tempest	extinct 1865	
Tempest of Heaton	1866	Tempest	extinct 1894	
Temple of the Nash	1876	Temple	extant	
Tennant of The Glen	1885	Tennant	extant	second Baronet created Baron Glenconner in 1911
Tennyson-d'Eyncourt of Carters Corner	1930	Tennyson-d'Eyncourt	extant	
Thatcher of Scotney	1991	Thatcher	extant	
Thomas-Stanford of Brighton	1929	Thomas-Stanford	extinct 1932	
Thomas of Garreglwyd	1918	Thomas	extant	
Thomas of Ynyshir	1919	Thomas	extant	
Thompson of Park Gate	1890	Thompson	extant	
Thompson of Hartsbourne Manor	1806	Thompson	extant	
Thompson of Reculver	1963	Thompson	extant	
Thompson of Walton-on-the-Hill	1963	Thompson	extant	
Thompson of Wimpole Street	1899	Thompson	extinct 1944	
Thomson of Glendarroch	1929	Thomson	extant	
Thomson of Monken Hadley	1938	Thomson	extinct 1953	
Thomson of Old Nunthorpe	1925	Thomson	extant	
Thornhill of Riddlesworth Hall and Pakenham Lodge	1885	Thornhill, Compton-Thornhill	extinct 1949	
Thursby of Ormerod House	1887	Thursby	extinct 1941	
Tierney of Brighton	1818	Tierney	extinct 1845	first Baronet obtained a new patent in 1834, which creation became extinct in 1860
Tierney of Brighton	1834	Tierney	extinct 1860	first Baronet had already been created a Baronet in 1818, which title became extinct in 1845
Tomlinson of Richmond Terrace	1902	Tomlinson	extinct 1912	
Touche of Dorking	1962	Touche	extant	
Touche of Westcott	1920	Touche	extant	
Townsend-Farquhar of Mauritius	1821	Townsend-Farquhar	extinct 1924	
Treloar of Grange Mount	1907	Treloar	extinct 1923	Lord Mayor of London
Trenchard of Wolfeton	1919	Trenchard	extant	first Baronet created Viscount Trenchard in 1936
Trevelyan of Madras	1874	Trevelyan	extant	
Treves of Dorchester	1902	Treves	extinct 1923	
Tritton of Bloomfield	1905	Tritton	extant	
Trotter of West Ville	1821	Trotter, Lindsay	extinct 1913	
Truscott of Oakleigh	1909	Truscott	extant	Lord Mayor of London; unproven (third Baronet died 2001) – under review
Tubbs of Wooton-under-Edge	1929	Tubbs	extinct 1941	
Tuck of Park Crescent	1910	Tuck	extant	
Tufton of Appleby Castle, Skipton Castle and Hothfield Place	1851	Tufton	extant	second Baronet created Baron Hothfield in 1881
Tupper of Armdale	1888	Tupper	extant	
Turton of Upsall	1926	Turton	extinct 1929	
Twisleton-Wykeham-Fiennes of Banbury	1916	Twisleton-Wykeham-Fiennes	extant	
Tyler of Queenhithe and Penywern Road	1894	Tyler	extinct 1907	Lord Mayor of London
Tyrell of Boreham	1809	Tyrell	extinct 1877	
Jones, later Tyrwhitt, later Tyrwhitt-Wilson of Stanley Hall	1808	Jones, Tyrwhitt, Tyrwhitt-Wilson	extinct 1950	also Baron Berners from 1917 to 1950
Tyrwhitt of Terschelling	1919	Tyrwhitt	extant	

== U–V ==
Title	Date of creation	Surname	Current status	Notes
Uniacke-Penrose-Fitzgerald of Lisquinlan	1896	Uniacke-Penrose-Fitzgerald	extinct 1919	
Usher of Norton	1899	Usher	extant	
Vassar-Smith of Charlton Park	1917	Vassar-Smith	extant	
Vaughan-Morgan of Outwood	1960	Vaughan-Morgan	extinct 1995	first Baronet created a life peer as Baron Reigate in 1970
Vavasour of Alverstoke	1828	Vavasour	extant	
Vavasour of Spaldington	1801	Vavasour	extinct 1912	
Verdin of The Brockhurst and Wimboldsley	1896	Verdin	extinct 1920	
Verner of Verners Bridge	1846	Verner	extinct 1975	
Verney of Eaton Square	1946	Verney	dormant	second Baronet died 1993
Vernon of Hanbury Hall	1885	Vernon	extinct 1940	
Vernon of Shotwick Park	1914	Vernon	extant	
Vestey of Kingswood	1913	Vestey	extant	first Baronet created Baron Vestey in 1922
Vestey of Shirley	1921	Vestey	extant	
Vivian of Singleton	1882	Vivian	extant	first Baronet created Baron Swansea in 1893
Vivian of Truro	1828	Vivian	extant	first Baronet created Baron Vivian in 1841

== W ==
Title	Date of creation	Surname	Current status	Notes
Waechter of Ramanest	1911	Waechter	extinct 1985	
Wakefield of Kendal	1962	Wakefield	extant	
Wakefield of Saltwood	1917	Wakefield	extinct 1941	Lord Mayor of London; first Baronet created Viscount Wakefield in 1934
Wakeley of Liss	1952	Wakeley	extant	
Wakeman of Perdiswell and Hinton Hall	1828	Wakeman	extinct 2008	
Waley-Cohen of Honeymead	1961	Waley-Cohen	extant	Lord Mayor of London
Walker-Smith of Broxbourne	1960	Walker-Smith	extant	
Walker, later Forestier-Walker of Castleton	1835	Walker, Forestier-Walker	extant	
Walker of Gateacre Grange and Osmaston Manor	1886	Walker, Walker-Okeover	extant	
Walker of Oakley House	1856	Walker	extant	unproven (fourth Baronet died 2005) – under review
Walker of Pembroke House	1906	Walker	extant	unproven (fourth Baronet died 2004) – under review
Walker of Sand Hutton and Beachampton	1868	Walker	extant	
Wallace of Hertford House	1871	Wallace	extinct 1890	
Wallace of Studham	1937	Wallace	extinct 1944	
Wallace of Terreglestown	1922	Wallace	extinct 1940	
Waller of Goffies Park	1815	Waller	extinct 1995	
Walrond of Bradfield and Newcourt	1876	Walrond	extinct 1966	second Baronet created Baron Waleran in 1905
Walsh of Ormathwaite and Warfield	1804	Walsh	extinct 1984	
Walsham of Grayswood House	1831	Walsham	extant	
Walton of Rushpool	1910	Walton	extinct 1923	
Ward of Blyth	1929	Ward	extinct 1956	
Ward of Awarna	1911	Ward	extant	
Ward of Wilbraham Place	1914	Ward	extinct 1973	
Warde of Barham Court	1919	Warde	extinct 1937	
Waring of Foots Cray Place	1919	Waring	extinct 1940	first Baronet created Baron Waring in 1922
Waring of St Bartholomew's	1935	Waring	extant	President of the Royal College of Surgeons
Warmington of Pembridge Square	1908	Warmington	extant	
Warner of Brettenham Park	1910	Warner	extant	
Waterlow of Harrow Weald	1930	Waterlow	extant	Lord Mayor of London
Waterlow of London	1873	Waterlow	extant	Lord Mayor of London
Watkin of Rose Hill	1880	Watkin	extinct 1914	
Watson of Earnock	1895	Watson, Inglefield-Watson	extant	
Watson of London	1866	Watson	extant	President of the Royal College of Physicians
Watson of Newport	1918	Watson	extinct 1959	
Watson of Sulhamstead	1912	Watson	extinct 1983	
Way of Montefiore and Kadlunga Mintaro	1899	Way	extinct 1916	
Webb-Johnson of Stoke-on-Trent	1945	Webb-Johnson	extinct 1958	President of the Royal College of Surgeons; first Baronet created Baron Webb-Johnson in 1948
Webb of Llwynarthen	1916	Webb	extinct 1940	only Baronet Sir Henry Webb
Webster of Winterfold and Alverstone	1900	Webster	extinct 1915	first Baronet created Viscount Alverstone in 1913
Wedderburn of Balindean	1803	Wedderburn, Ogilvy-Wedderburn	extant	
Wedgwood of Etruria	1942	Wedgwood	extant	
Weigall of Woodhall Spa	1938	Weigall	extinct 1952	
Welby of Denton Manor	1801	Welby	extant	
Welch of Chard	1957	Welch	extant	Lord Mayor of London
Wells of Felmersham	1944	Wells	extant	
Wells of Hove	1948	Wells	extinct 1966	Lord Mayor of London
Wells of Upper Grosvenor Street and Golder's Hill	1883	Wells	extinct 1906	President of the Royal College of Surgeons
Wernher of Luton Hoo	1905	Wernher	extinct 1973	
Western of Rivenhall	1864	Western	extinct 1917	
Weston of Kendal	1926	Weston	extinct 1926	
Wheatley	1847	Wheatley	extinct 21 March 1852	
Wheeler of Woodhouse	1920	Wheeler	extant	
Wheler of Otterden	1925	Wheler	extinct 1927	
Whitaker of Babworth	1936	Whitaker	extant	
White-Todd of Eaton Place	1913	White-Todd	extinct 1926	
White of Boulge Hall	1937	White	dormant	second Baronet died 1972
White of Cotham House	1904	White	extant	
White of Salle Park	1922	White	extant	
White of Walling Walls	1802	White	extant	
Whitehead of Culham	1889	Whitehead	extant	Lord Mayor of London
Whitmore of Orsett	1954	Whitmore	extant	
Whitworth of The Firs	1869	Whitworth	extinct 1887	
Wigan of Paston Hall	1898	Wigan	dormant	fifth Baronet died 1996
Wiggin of Honnington Hall	1892	Wiggin	extant	
Wigram of Walthamstow House	1805	Wigram	extant	
Wilkinson of Brook	1941	Wilkinson	extant	Lord Mayor of London
Wilks of Grosvenor Street	1898	Wilks	extinct 1911	President of the Royal College of Physicians
Williams of Bridehead	1915	Williams	extant	
Williams of Cilgeraint	1953	Williams	extant	
Williams of Castell Deudrath and Borthwen	1909	Williams	extinct 2012	
Williams of Glynwr	1935	Williams	extinct 1959	
Williams of Kars	1856	Williams	extinct 1883	
Williams of Brook Street	1894	Williams	extinct 1926	
Williams of Park	1928	Williams	extinct 1938	
Williams of Tregullow	1866	Williams	extant	
Williams of Llanelly	1955	Williams	extinct 1958	
Williamson of Glenogle	1909	Williamson	extant	first Baronet created Baron Forres in 1922
Willink of Dingle Bank	1957	Willink	extant	
Wills of Coombe Lodge	1893	Wills	extinct 1911	first Baronet created Baron Winterstoke in 1906
Wills of Blagdon	1923	Wills	extant	
Wills of Hazlewood and Clapton-in-Gordano	1904	Wills	extant	
Wills of Northmoor	1897	Wills	extant	second Baronet created Baron Dulverton in 1929
Willshire of the East Indies	1841	Willshire	extinct 1947	
Wilson-Todd of Halnaby Hall and Tranby Park	1903	Wilson-Todd	extinct 1925	
Wilson of Airdrie	1906	Wilson	extant	
Wilson of Archer House	1897	Wilson	extinct 1907	
Wilson of Carbeth	1920	Wilson	extant	
Wilson of Currygrane	1919	Wilson	extinct 1922	
Wilson of Delhi	1858	Wilson	extinct 1921	
Wilson of Eshton Hall	1874	Wilson	extant	
Wingate of Dunbar	1920	Wingate	extinct 1978	
Wolfson of St Marylebone	1962	Wolfson	extinct 2010	second Baronet created a life peer as Baron Wolfson in 1985
Womersley of Grimsby	1945	Womersley	extant	
Wood of Gatton	1808	Wood	extinct 1837	
Wood of Hatherley House	1837	Wood	extant	
Wood of Hengrave	1918	Wood	extinct 1974	
Wood of The Hermitage	1897	Wood	extinct 1946	
Worley of Ockshott	1928	Worley	extinct 1937	
Worsfold of The Hall Place	1924	Worsfold	extinct 1936	
Worsley-Taylor of Moreton Hall	1917	Worsley-Taylor	extinct 1958	
Worsley of Hovingham Hall	1838	Worsley	extant	
Worthington-Evans of Colchester	1916	Worthington-Evans	extinct 1971	
Wraxall of Wraxall	1813	Wraxall	extant	
Wright of Swansea	1920	Wright	extinct 1950	
Wrightson of Neasham Hall	1900	Wrightson	extant	
Wrixon-Becher of Ballygiblin	1831	Wrixon-Becher	extant	
Wylie of St Petersburg	1814	Wylie	extinct 1845	

== Y ==
Title	Date of creation	Surname	Current status	Notes
Yarrow of Homstead	1916	Yarrow	extant	
Yate of Madeley Hall	1921	Yate	extinct 1940	
Young of Bailieborough	1821	Young	extant	second Baronet created Baron Lisgar in 1870, which title became extinct in 1887
Young of Formosa Place	1813	Young	extant	
Young of Patrick	1945	Young	extant	
Younger of Auchen Castle	1911	Younger	extant	
Younger of Fountain Bridge	1964	Younger	extinct 1992	
Younger of Leckie	1911	Younger	extant	first Baronet created Viscount Younger of Leckie in 1923
Yule of Hugli River	1922	Yule	extinct 1928	

== See also ==
- Baronet
- List of baronetcies in the Baronetage of Ireland
- List of baronetcies in the Baronetage of Nova Scotia
- List of baronetcies in the Baronetage of England
- List of baronetcies in the Baronetage of Great Britain
- List of extant Baronetcies
