= List of baronetcies in the Baronetage of the United Kingdom: Y =

Peerages and baronetcies of Britain and Ireland
| Extant | All |
|---|---|
| Dukes | Dukedoms |
| Marquesses | Marquessates |
| Earls | Earldoms |
| Viscounts | Viscountcies |
| Barons | Baronies |
| Baronets | Baronetcies |
En, Ire, NS, GB, UK (extinct)

This is a list of baronetcies in the Baronetage of the United Kingdom. They have been created since 1801 when they replaced the baronetages in the Baronetage of Great Britain, and Baronetage of Ireland. This list is not currently complete.

| Title | Date of creation | Surname | Current status | Notes |
|---|---|---|---|---|
| Yarrow of Homstead | 1916 | Yarrow | extant | |
| Yate of Madeley Hall | 1921 | Yate | extinct 1940 | |
| Young of Bailieborough | 1821 | Young | extant | second Baronet created Baron Lisgar in 1870, which title became extinct in 1887 |
| Young of Formosa Place | 1813 | Young | extant | sixth Baronet created a life peer as Baron Young of Cookham in 2015 |
| Young of Patrick | 1945 | Young | extant | |
| Younger of Auchen Castle | 1911 | Younger | extant | |
| Younger of Fountain Bridge | 1964 | Younger | extinct 1992 | |
| Younger of Leckie | 1911 | Younger | extant | first Baronet created Viscount Younger of Leckie in 1923 |
| Yule of Hugli River | 1922 | Yule | extinct 1928 | |
