= Bell baronets =

Set index for Bell baronets

There have been four baronetcies created for persons with the surname Bell, all in the Baronetage of the United Kingdom. One creation is extant as of 2026.

- Bell baronets of Rounton Grange and Washington Hall (1885)
- Bell baronets of Marlborough Terrace (1895)
- Bell baronets of Framewood (1908): see John Charles Bell (1843–1924)
- Bell baronets of Mynthurst (1909)

== See also ==
- Morrison-Bell baronets
