= Rose baronets =

Set index for Rose baronets

There have been four baronetcies created for persons with the surname Rose, all in the Baronetage of the United Kingdom. As of 2026, three of the creations are extant.

- Rose baronets of Montreal (1872)
- Rose baronets of Rayners (1874)
- Rose baronets of Hardwick House (1909)
- Rose baronets of Leith (1935)
