= William McEwan Younger =

Scottish brewer and political activist (1905–1992)

Sir William McEwan Younger, 1st Baronet (6 September 1905 – 15 April 1992) was a Scottish brewer and political activist.

His father, William Younger, was a brother of George Younger, 1st Viscount Younger, and of Robert Younger, Baron Blanesburgh; his great-uncle was William McEwan, a Liberal MP for Edinburgh and the founder of McEwan's Brewery.

He was educated at Winchester College and at Balliol College, Oxford, before joining the firm of McEwan's Brewery, which later became Scottish Brewers before merging with the Newcastle Brewery Company in 1961 to become Scottish & Newcastle. Younger was the first chairman and managing director of the new company.

He stood twice as the Unionist Party candidate for West Lothian at the 1950 general election, but it was a safe seat for Labour and he was not elected. He was honorary secretary of the Scottish Unionist Association from 1955 to 1964, and was later chairman of the Scottish Conservative and Unionist Party from 1971 to 1974.

He was made a Baronet in February 1964, of Fountainbridge, in the county of city of Edinburgh; the title became extinct on his death. He was appointed as a Deputy Lieutenant of the City of Edinburgh District Council in 1984.

Baronetage of the United Kingdom
New creation	Baronet (of Fountainbridge); 1964–1992	Extinct
