= Wallace baronets =

Extinct baronetcy in the Baronetage of the United Kingdom

There have been five Wallace Baronetcies; two in the Baronetage of Nova Scotia, and three in the Baronetage of the United Kingdom. All are now extinct.

== Wallace baronets, of Craigie Wallace, Ayr (1638—1659) ==
Created in the Baronetage of Nova Scotia.

- Sir Hugh Wallace, 1st Baronet (c. 1600–1660) (resigned the baronetcy in 1659)

== Wallace baronets, of Craigie, Ayr (8 March 1670—18 August 1770) ==
Created in the Baronetage of Nova Scotia.

- Sir Thomas Wallace, 1st Baronet (died 1680)
- Sir William Wallace, 2nd Baronet (died 1700)
- Sir Thomas Wallace, 3rd Baronet (1665–1728)
- Sir Thomas Wallace, 4th Baronet (1702–1770) extinct on his death.

Style of baronet subsequently assumed by:

- Sir Thomas Dunlop Wallace (1750–1835)
- Sir John Alexander Dunlop Agnew Wallace (1775–1857)

== Wallace baronets, of Hertford House, London (24 November 1871—20 July 1890) ==
Created in the Baronetage of the United Kingdom.

- Sir Richard Wallace, 1st Baronet (1818–1890) extinct on his death.

== Wallace baronets, of Terreglestown, Kirkcudbright (25 January 1922—5 February 1940) ==
Created in the Baronetage of the United Kingdom.

- Sir Matthew Gemmill Wallace, 1st Baronet (1854–1940) extinct on his death.

== Wallace baronets, of Studham, Bedfordshire (8 June 1937—24 May 1944) ==
Created in the Baronetage of the United Kingdom.

- Sir Cuthbert Sidney Wallace, 1st Baronet (1867–1944) extinct on his death.

== See also ==
- Craigie Castle, Ayrshire – a Wallace family barony.
