= Ewart baronets =

Set index for Ewart baronets

There have been two baronetcies created for persons with the surname Ewart, both in the Baronetage of the United Kingdom. One creation is extant as of 2010.

- Ewart baronets of Glenmachan House and Glenbank (1887)
- Ewart baronets of White House (1910): see Sir Henry Ewart, 1st Baronet (1838–1928)
