= Ripley baronets =

Set index for Ripley baronets

There have been two baronetcies created for members of the Ripley family, both in the Baronetage of the United Kingdom. As of 2026 one creation is extant.

- Ripley baronets of Rawdon (1880)
- Ripley baronets of Acacia (1897)
