= Ellis baronets =

Set index for Ellis baronets

There have been two baronetcies created for persons with the surname Ellis, both in the Baronetage of the United Kingdom. Both creations are extinct.

- Ellis baronets of Byfleet and Hertford Street (1882): see Sir John Whittaker Ellis, 1st Baronet (1829–1912)
- Ellis baronets of Thresfield (1932): see Sir Robert Geoffrey Ellis, 1st Baronet (1874–1956)
