= Dalziel baronets =

Extinct baronetcy in the Baronetage of the United Kingdom

There have been two Baronetcies created for persons with the surname Dalziel, both in the Baronetage of the United Kingdom. Both creations are extinct.

The Dalziel Baronetcy, of Brooklands, Chobham, in the County of Surrey, was created in the Baronetage of the United Kingdom on 25 January 1918. For more information on this creation, see Henry Dalziel, 1st Baron Dalziel of Kirkcaldy.

The Dalziel Baronetcy, of Grosvenor Place, was created in the Baronetage of the United Kingdom on 14 May 1919. For more information on this creation, see Davison Dalziel, 1st Baron Dalziel of Wooler.

== Dalziel Baronets, of Brooklands (1918) ==
- see Henry Dalziel, 1st Baron Dalziel of Kirkcaldy

== Danziel Baronets, of Grosvenor Place (1919) ==
- see Davison Dalziel, 1st Baron Dalziel of Wooler
