= Rutherford baronets =

Extinct baronetcy in the Baronetage of the United Kingdom

There have been two creations of baronets with the surname Rutherford. Both baronetcies were created in the Baronetcy of the United Kingdom, and both are now extinct:

== Rutherford of Beardwood, Lancs (1916) ==
- Sir John Rutherford, 1st Baronet (1854–1932)

(extinct on his death)

== Rutherford of Liverpool (1923) ==
- Sir William Watson Rutherford, 1st Baronet (1853–1927)
- Sir John Hugo Rutherford, 2nd Baronet (1887–1942)

(extinct on the death of the second Baronet)
