= Morris baronets =

Set index for Morris baronets

There have been four baronetcies created for persons with the surname Morris, all in the Baronetage of the United Kingdom. As of 2023 two of the creations are extant.

- Morris baronets of Clasemont (1806)
- Morris baronets of Spiddal (1885): see Baron Killanin
- Morris baronets of Cavendish Square (1909): see Sir Henry Morris, 1st Baronet (1844–1926)
- Morris baronets of Nuffield (1929): see the Viscount Nuffield

== See also ==
- Baron Morris
