= Wylie baronets =

Extinct baronetcy in the Baronetage of the United Kingdom

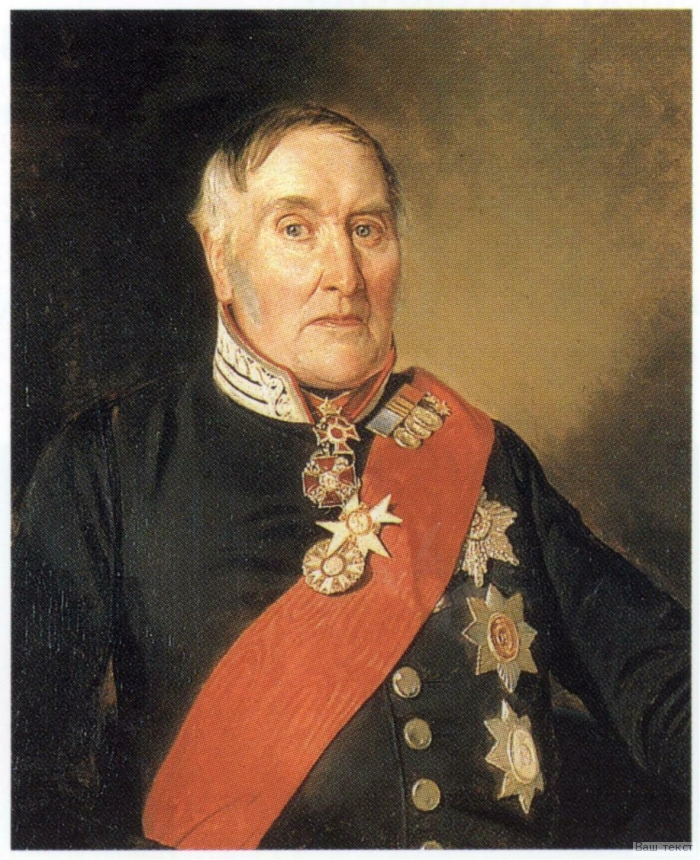
Sir James Wylie, 1st Baronet

The Wylie Baronetcy, of St Petersburg, was a title in the Baronetage of the United Kingdom. It was created on 2 July 1814 for James Wylie, private physician to three successive Tsars of Russia. The title became extinct upon his death in 1854.

== Wylie baronet, of St Petersburg (1814) ==
- Sir James Wylie, 1st Baronet (1768–1854)
