= Newson-Smith baronets =

Baronetcy in the Baronetage of the United Kingdom

The Newson-Smith Baronetcy, of Totteridge in the County of Hertford, is a title in the Baronetage of the United Kingdom. It was created on 1 December 1944 for Frank Newson-Smith, Lord Mayor of London from 1943 to 1944. He was succeeded by his son, the second Baronet. He was a deputy lieutenant for the City of London. As of 2014 the title is held by the latter's son, the third Baronet, who succeeded in 1997.

== Newson-Smith baronets, of Totteridge (1944) ==
- Sir Frank Edwin Newson-Smith, 1st Baronet (1879–1971) Lord Mayor of London 1943-44.
- Sir John Kenneth Newson-Smith, 2nd Baronet (1911–1997)
- Sir Peter Frank Graham Newson-Smith, 3rd Baronet (born 1947)

The heir apparent and sole heir is the present holder's son Oliver Nicholas Peter Newson-Smith (born 1975).
