= Dewar baronets =

Set index for Dewar baronets

There have been two baronetcies created for persons with the surname Dewar, both in the Baronetage of the United Kingdom. The first was created in 1907, for John Alexander Dewar, and the other in 1917 for his son Thomas Robert Dewar. Both were later elevated to the peerage, as Baron Forteviot and Baron Dewar, respectively.

- Dewar baronets of Dupplin (1907): see Baron Forteviot
- Dewar baronets of Homestall Manor (1917): see Baron Dewar
