= Lyell baronets =

Set index for Lyell baronets

There have been two baronetcies created for members of the Lyell family, both in the Baronetage of the United Kingdom. Both creations are extinct.

- Lyell baronets of Kinnordy (1st creation, 1864): see Sir Charles Lyell, 1st Baronet (1797–1875)
- Lyell baronets of Kinnordy (2nd creation, 1894): see Baron Lyell
