= Brooks baronets =

Set index for Brooks baronets

There have been two baronetcies created for persons with the surname Brooks, both in the Baronetage of the United Kingdom. As of 2026 one creation is extant.

- Brooks baronets of Manchester (1886): see Sir William Cunliffe Brooks, 1st Baronet (1819–1900)
- Brooks baronets, of Crawshaw Hall and Whatton House (1891): see Baron Crawshaw
