= Carlile baronets =

Extinct baronetcy in the Baronetage of the United Kingdom

There have been two baronetcies created for persons with the surname Carlile, both in the Baronetage of the United Kingdom. Both titles became extinct on the death of the first baronet.

== Carlile baronets, of Ponsbourne Park, Herts (1917) ==
Escutcheon of the Carlile baronets of Ponsbourne Park

- Sir Edward Hildred Carlile, 1st Baronet (1852–1942), Member of Parliament (MP) for St Albans 1906–1919

== Carlile baronets, of Gayhurst, Bucks (1928) ==
Escutcheon of the Carlile baronets of Gayhurst

- Sir William Walter Carlile, 1st Baronet (1862–1928), Member of Parliament (MP) for Buckingham 1895–1906
