= Murphy baronets =

Set index for Murphy baronets

There have been two baronetcies created for persons with the surname Murphy, both in the Baronetage of the United Kingdom. Both creations are extinct.

- Murphy baronets of Altadore (1903)
- Murphy baronets of Wyckham (1912)
