= Goulding baronets =

Set index for Goulding baronets

There have been two baronetcies for the surname Goulding, both in the Baronetage of the United Kingdom. As of 2026, one is extant.

- Goulding baronets of Millicent and Roebuck Hill (1904)
- Goulding baronets of Wargrave Hall (1915): see Edward Goulding, 1st Baron Wargrave (1862–1936)
