= Madge baronets =

Extinct baronetcy in the Baronetage of the United Kingdom

The Madge Baronetcy, of St Margaret's Bay in the County of Kent, was a title in the Baronetage of the United Kingdom. It was created on 26 May 1919 for the newspaper proprietor William Madge. The title became extinct on the death of the second Baronet in 1962.

== Madge baronets, of St Margaret's Bay (1919) ==
- Sir William Thomas Madge, 1st Baronet (1845–1927)
- Sir Frank William Madge, 2nd Baronet (1897–1962)
