= Henry Lyons, 1st Baron Ennisdale =

Major-General Henry Edward Lyons, 1st Baron Ennisdale, OBE (29 August 1877 – 17 August 1963), known as Sir Henry Lyons, Bt, between 1937 and 1939, was a British Army officer, businessman and politician.

Lyons was the son of John Edward Lyons, of Ennis, County Clare. He fought in the Second Boer War and the First World War, and was appointed an Officer of the Order of the British Empire (OBE) in 1919. He gained great wealth as an insurance broker. He was a member of the Liberal National Council and Executive Committee and was knighted in 1933, "for political and public services". He was further honoured when he was created a baronet, of St James's Place in the City of Westminster, in 1937 and raised to the peerage as Baron Ennisdale, of Grateley in the County of Southampton, in 1939. Despite being entitled to a seat in parliament after his elevation to the peerage he is not recorded as having ever spoken in the House of Lords.

Lord Ennisdale married Helen, daughter of Frank Bishop, in 1905. He died in August 1963, aged 85. The baronetcy and barony died with him.

Baronetage of the United Kingdom
New creation	Baronet (of St James's Place); 1937–1963	Extinct
Peerage of the United Kingdom
New creation	Baron Ennisdale; 1939–1963	Extinct
