= Morrison-Bell baronets =

Set index for Morrison-Bell baronets

There have been two baronetcies created for members of the Morrison-Bell family, both in the Baronetage of the United Kingdom.

- Morrison-Bell baronets of Otterburn Hall (1905)
- Morrison-Bell baronets of Harpford (1923): see Sir Clive Morrison-Bell, 1st Baronet (1871–1956)
