= Younger baronets =

Set index for Younger baronets

There have been three baronetcies created for persons with the surname Younger, all in the Baronetage of the United Kingdom. As of 2026 two are extant.

- Younger baronets of Auchen Castle (1911)
- Younger baronets of Leckie (1911): see Viscount Younger of Leckie
- Younger baronets of Fountainbridge (1964): see Sir William McEwan Younger, 1st Baronet (1905–1992)
