= Rose baronets of Rayners (1874) =

Escutcheon of the Rose baronets of Rayners

The Rose baronetcy, of Rayners in the County of Buckingham, was created in the Baronetage of the United Kingdom on 14 May 1874 for the solicitor and political agent, Philip Rose, legal counsel to the Conservative Party and founder of the Brompton Hospital for Consumption.

As of 2026, the baronetcy is marked dormant on the Official Roll.

== Rose baronets, of Rayners (1874) ==
- Sir Philip Rose, 1st Baronet (1816–1883)
- Sir Philip Frederick Rose, 2nd Baronet (1843–1919)
- Sir Philip Humphrey Vivian Rose, 3rd Baronet (1903–1982)
- Sir David Lancaster Rose, presumed 4th Baronet (1934–2020); in 2019 his name did not appear on the Official Roll.
- Sir Christopher David Rose, presumed 5th Baronet (born 1968), son of the presumed 4th Baronet.

=== Line of succession ===
- Sir Philip Rose of Rayners, 1st Baronet (1816—1883)
  - Sir Philip Frederick Rose of Rayners, 2nd Baronet (1843—1919)
    - Philip Vivian Rose (1869—1917)
      - Sir Philip Humphrey Vivian Rose of Rayners, 3rd Baronet (1903—1982)
  - Bateman Lancaster Rose (1852—1912)
    - Ronald Paul Lancaster Rose (1907–1977)
      - Sir David Lancaster Rose of Rayners, 4th Baronet (1934–2020)
        - Sir Christopher David Rose of Rayners, 5th Baronet (b. 1968)
  - George Alfred Sainte Croix Rose (1854—1926)
    - Ivor Sainte Croix Rose (1881–1962)
      - George Vivian Sainte Croix Rose (1939–1997)
        - (1) Philip Vivian Sainte Croix Rose (b. 1961)
