= List of baronetcies in the Baronetage of the United Kingdom: D =

Peerages and baronetcies of Britain and Ireland
Extant	All
Dukes	Dukedoms
Marquesses	Marquessates
Earls	Earldoms
Viscounts	Viscountcies
Barons	Baronies
Baronets	Baronetcies
En, Ire, NS, GB, UK (extinct)

This is a list of baronetcies in the Baronetage of the United Kingdom. They have been created since 1801 when they replaced the baronetages in the Baronetage of Great Britain, and Baronetage of Ireland. This list is not currently complete.

Title	Date of creation	Surname	Current status	Notes
D'Avigdor-Goldsmid of Somerhill	1934	D'Avigdor-Goldsmid	extinct 1987	
D'Oyly of Kandy	1821	D'Oyly	extinct 1824	
Dale of West Lodge	1895	Dale	extinct 1932	
Dalgleish of Erroll Park, Mayfield, Woodburne and Baltilly, and Coulin	1896	Dalgleish	extinct 1913	
Dalrymple-Horn-Elphinstone of Horn and Logie Elphinstone	1828	Dalrymple-Horn-Elphinstone	dormant 1956	
Dalrymple-White of High Mark	1926	Dalrymple-White	extant	
Dalrymple of New Hailes	1887	Dalrymple	extinct 1971	
Dalziel of Brookland	1918	Dalziel	extinct 1935	first Baronet created Baron Dalziel of Kirkcaldy in 1921
Dalziel of Grosvenor Place	1919	Dalziel	extinct 1928	first Baronet created Baron Dalziel of Wooler in 1927
Dalrymple of High Mark	1815	Dalrymple	extinct 1866	
David of Bombay	1911	David	extinct 1964	
Davis-Goff of Glenville	1905	Davis-Goff	extant	
Davis of Barrington Hall	1946	Davis	extant	Lord Mayor of London
Davis of Hollywood	1845	Davis	extinct 1896	
Davson of Berbice	1927	Davson	extant	unproven (third Baronet died 2004) - under review
Davy of Grosvenor Street	1818	Davy	extinct 1829	
Dawson of Appleton Roebuck	1929	Dawson	extinct 1974	
Dawson of Edgwarebury	1920	Dawson	extant	
de Bathe of Knightstown, Cashell and Ladyrath	1801	de Bathe	extinct 1941	
de Bunsen of Abbey Lodge	1919	de Bunsen	extinct 1932	
de Capell-Brooke of Oakley	1803	de Capell-Brooke	extinct 1968	
de la Bere of Crowborough	1953	de La Bere	extinct 2017	Lord Mayor of London
de La Rue of Normans	1898	de La Rue	extant	
de Robeck of Naas	1919	de Robeck	extinct 1928	
de Saumarez of Guernsey	1801	de Saumarez	extant	first Baronet created Baron de Saumarez in 1831
de Sausmarez of Jedburg	1928	de Sausmarez	extinct 1941	
de Trafford of Trafford Park	1841	de Trafford	extant	
Debenham of Bladen	1931	Debenham	extant	
Denman of Staffield	1945	Denman	extant	second Baronet succeeded as Baron Denman in 1971
Denny of Dumbarton	1913	Denny	extant	
Denys of Stratford Place	1813	Denys	extinct 1960	
Devitt of Pangbourne	1916	Devitt	extant	
Devitt of Pangbourne	1931	Devitt	extinct 1947	
Dewar of Dupplin	1907	Dewar	extant	first Baronet created Baron Forteviot in 1917
Dewar of Homestall Manor	1917	Dewar	extinct 1930	first Baronet created Baron Dewar in 1919
Dewey of Asheldham	1917	Dewey	extant	
Dickson-Poynder of Hardingham Hall	1802	Dickson-Poynder	extinct 1936	sixth Baronet created Baron Islington in 1910
Dilke of Sloane Street	1862	Dilke	extant	
Dillon of Lismullen	1801	Dillon	extinct 1982	
Dillwyn-Llewellyn of Penllergaer and Ynis y gerwn	1890	Dillwyn-Llewellyn, Dillwyn-Venables-Llewellyn	extant	
Dimsdale of Goldsmiths and Lancaster Street	1902	Dimsdale	extinct 1978	Lord Mayor of London
Dixon-Hartland of Middleton Manor	1892	Dixon-Hartland	extinct 1909	
Dixon of Astle	1919	Dixon	extant	
Dixon of Ballymenock	1903	Dixon	extant	Lord Mayor of Belfast; third Baronet created Baron Glentoran in 1939
Dixon of Warford	1918	Dixon	extinct 1920	
Dodds of West Chiltington	1964	Dodds	extinct 2015	President of the Royal College of Physicians
Domvile of Templeogue and Santry House	1815	Domvile	extinct 1913	
Domville of St Albans	1814	Domville	extinct 1981	Lord Mayor of London
Donner of Oak Mount	1907	Donner	extinct 1934	
Dorington of Lypiatt	1886	Dorington	extinct 1911	
Dorman of Nunthorpe	1923	Dorman	extant	
Douglas of Castle Douglas and Newton-Douglas	1801	Douglas	extinct 1809	
Douglas of Glenbervie	1831	Douglas	extinct 1986	
Doyle of Boscombe	1828	Doyle	extinct 1987	
Doyle of Guernsey	1825	Doyle	extinct 1834	The first Baronet had been gazetted a baronet in 1805 but this creation does not appear to have passed the Great Seal.
Drughorn of Ifield Hall	1922	Drughorn	extinct 1943	
Drummond, later Williams-Drummond of Hawthornden	1828	Drummond, Williams-Drummond	extinct 1976	
Drummond of Lasswade	1922	Drummond	extinct 1924	
Du Cros of Canons	1916	Du Cros	extant	
Duckworth of Grosvenor Place	1909	Duckworth	extant	
Duckworth of Topsham	1813	Duckworth	extinct 1887	
Dudley-Williams of Exeter	1964	Dudley-Williams	extant	
Dudley of Sloane Street and Kilscoran House	1813	Dudley	extinct 1824	
Duff of Halkin	1813	Duff, Duff-Gordon	extant	
Duff of Hatton	1952	Duff	extinct 1952	
Assheton-Smith, later Duff of Vaynol Park	1911	Assheton-Smith, Duff	extinct 1980	
Dugdale of Crathorne	1945	Dugdale	extant	first Baronet created Baron Crathorne in 1959
Dugdale of Merevale	1936	Dugdale	extant	
Duke of London	1849	Duke	extinct 1935	Lord Mayor of London
Dunbar of Boath	1814	Dunbar	extinct 1937	
Duncan of Horsforth Hall	1905	Duncan	extinct 1964	
Duncan of Jordanstone	1957	Duncan	extinct 1974	
Duncombe of Wood Hall	1919	Duncombe	extinct 1933	
Dundas of Arniston	1898	Dundas	extinct 1970	
Dundas of Beechwood	1821	Dundas	extinct 1981	
Dundas of Richmond	1815	Dundas	extinct 1868	
Dunlop of Dunlop	1838	Dunlop	extinct 1858	
Dunlop of Woodbourne	1916	Dunlop	extant	Lord Provost of Glasgow
Dunn of Bathurst	1921	Dunn	extinct 1976	
Dunn of Clitheroe	1917	Dunn	extinct 1971	Lord Mayor of London
Dunn of Lakenheath	1895	Dunn	extinct 1912	
Dunnell of York	1922	Dunnell	extinct 1960	
Dunning of Beedinlee	1930	Dunning	extant	
Dunnington-Jefferson of Thorhanby Hall	1958	Dunnington-Jefferson	extant	
Dupree of Craneswater	1921	Dupree	dormant	third Baronet died 1971
Durand of Ruckley Grange	1892	Durand	extant	
Durning-Lawrence of King's Ride	1898	Durning-Lawrence	extinct 1914	
Duveen of Milbank	1927	Duveen	extinct 1939	first Baronet created Baron Duveen in 1933
Dymoke of Scrivelsby	1841	Dymoke	extinct 1865	
