= Walled garden (disambiguation) =

A walled garden is a planned place of flora surrounded by walls.

Walled garden may also refer to:

- Walled Garden, Castle Howard, in England
- Walled garden (technology), a closed or exclusive set of information services provided for users
- Walled Gardens, a memoir by Annabel Davis-Goff
- The Walled Gardens a restaurant in Whalley Range, Manchester.
