= John Ellerman =

John Ellerman may refer to:

- Sir John Ellerman, 1st Baronet (1862–1933), English shipowner and investor
- Sir John Ellerman, 2nd Baronet (1909–1973), English shipowner, natural historian and philanthropist
