= Arthur Doyle (disambiguation) =

Arthur Doyle (1944–2014) was an American jazz musician.

Arthur Doyle may also refer to:

- Arthur Conan Doyle (1859–1930), British writer and medical doctor
- Sir Arthur Havelock James Doyle, 4th Baronet (1858–1948), of the Doyle baronets
