= 2nd Kent Artillery Volunteers =

2nd Kent Artillery Volunteers 4th London Brigade, RFA 91st (4th London) Field Regiment, RA 139th (4th London) Field Regiment, RA 291 (4th London) Airborne Regiment, RA
- Active: 13 February 1860 – 1 April 1967
- Country: United Kingdom
- Branch: Territorial Army
- Type: Artillery Regiment
- Role: Garrison Artillery; Field Artillery; Airborne Artillery
- Garrison/HQ: Plumstead (1860–1905); Lewisham (1905–1967)
- Nicknames: Lewisham Gunners; Shiny Fourth
- Engagements: Second Boer War; WWI: Battle of the Somme; German spring offensive; WWII: Battle of France; Dunkirk Evacuation; Operation Husky; Operation Baytown; Battle of Anzio; Battle of the Admin Box; Battle of Kohima

Commanders
- Notable commanders: Sir Edwin Hughes

The 2nd Kent Artillery Volunteers, later 4th London Brigade, Royal Field Artillery, popularly known as the Lewisham Gunners, was a volunteer unit of the British Army from 1860 until 1967. Initially raised in suburban West Kent, its recruiting area was later incorporated within the County of London. It provided two active service units in each of the World Wars, operating as far afield as Sicily, Burma and Madagascar, and later provided an airborne unit in the Territorial Army of the 1950s.

== Volunteer Force ==
The 9th Kent Artillery Volunteer Corps (9th KAVC) was one of many Volunteer units raised as a result of an invasion scare in 1859. Based at Plumstead, then in Kent, it was raised after a public meeting in December. Many of its first members were employed by the Royal Arsenal at Woolwich, which manufactured artillery and carried out proofing at Plumstead Marsh.

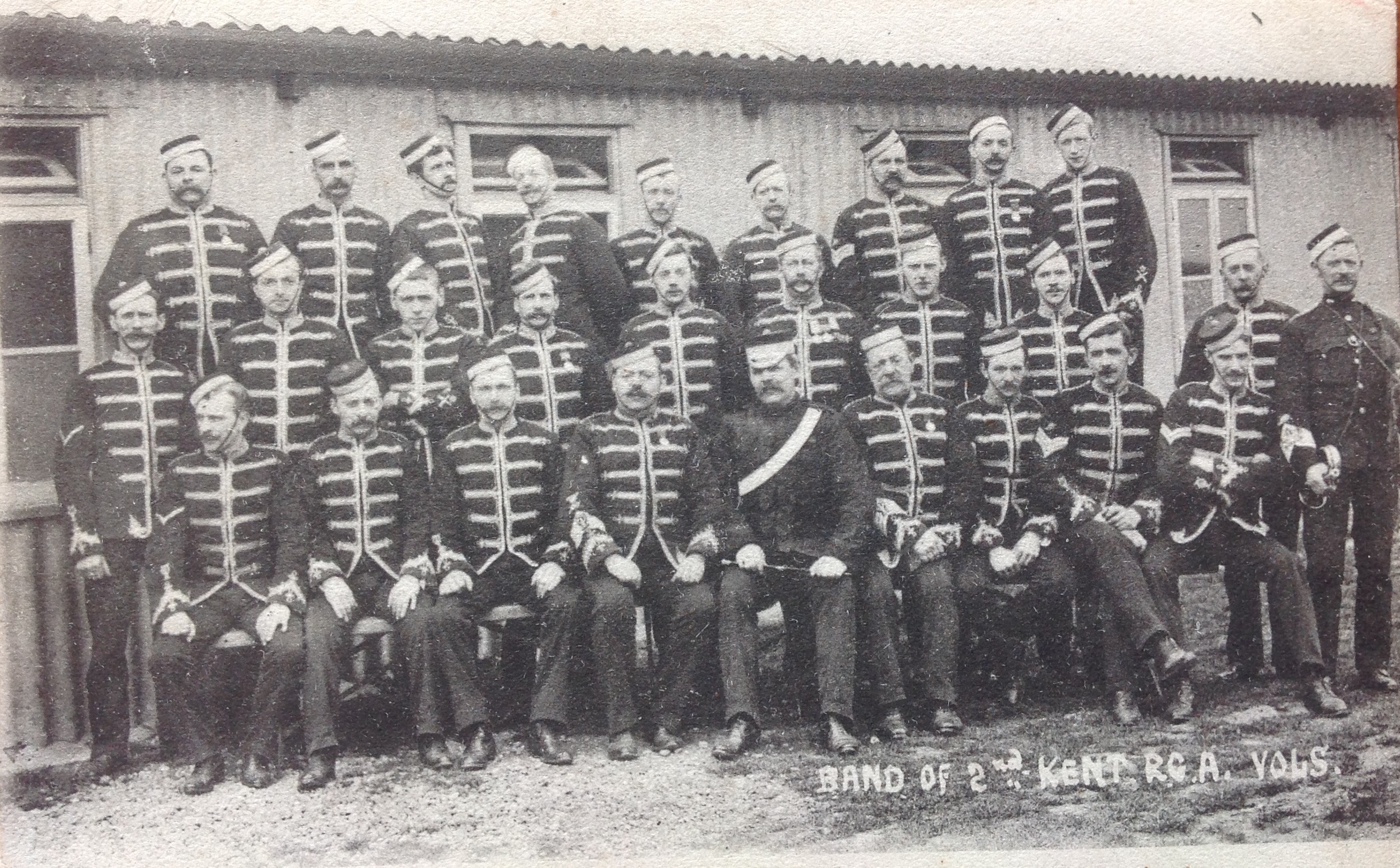
Band of the 2nd Kent RGA (volunteers), c1902

Officially raised as a sub-division within the 1st Administrative Brigade of Kent Artillery Volunteers on 13 February 1860, the date on which its first officers' commissions were issued, and was increased to battery strength on 15 August. The first commanding officer (CO) was William Tongue, who was replaced in 1865 by the local politician Edwin Hughes (later Sir Edwin Hughes), who became Captain-Commandant in 1868. The early equipment of the unit appears to have been two 32-pounder smoothbore muzzle-loading cannon, mounted in Hughes's garden; later these were converted into 64-pounder Rifled Muzzle-Loading (RML) cannon. In 1870 the 9th Kent AVC was separated from the 1st Admin Brigade and attached to the 10th (Royal Arsenal) KAVC based at Woolwich. The 9th KAVC reached a strength of 480 men organised in six batteries in 1877, when Hughes was promoted to lieutenant-colonel. He retired in 1888 (when he was succeeded in command by his son Edwin Talfourd Hughes) and was immediately appointed Honorary Colonel of the unit.

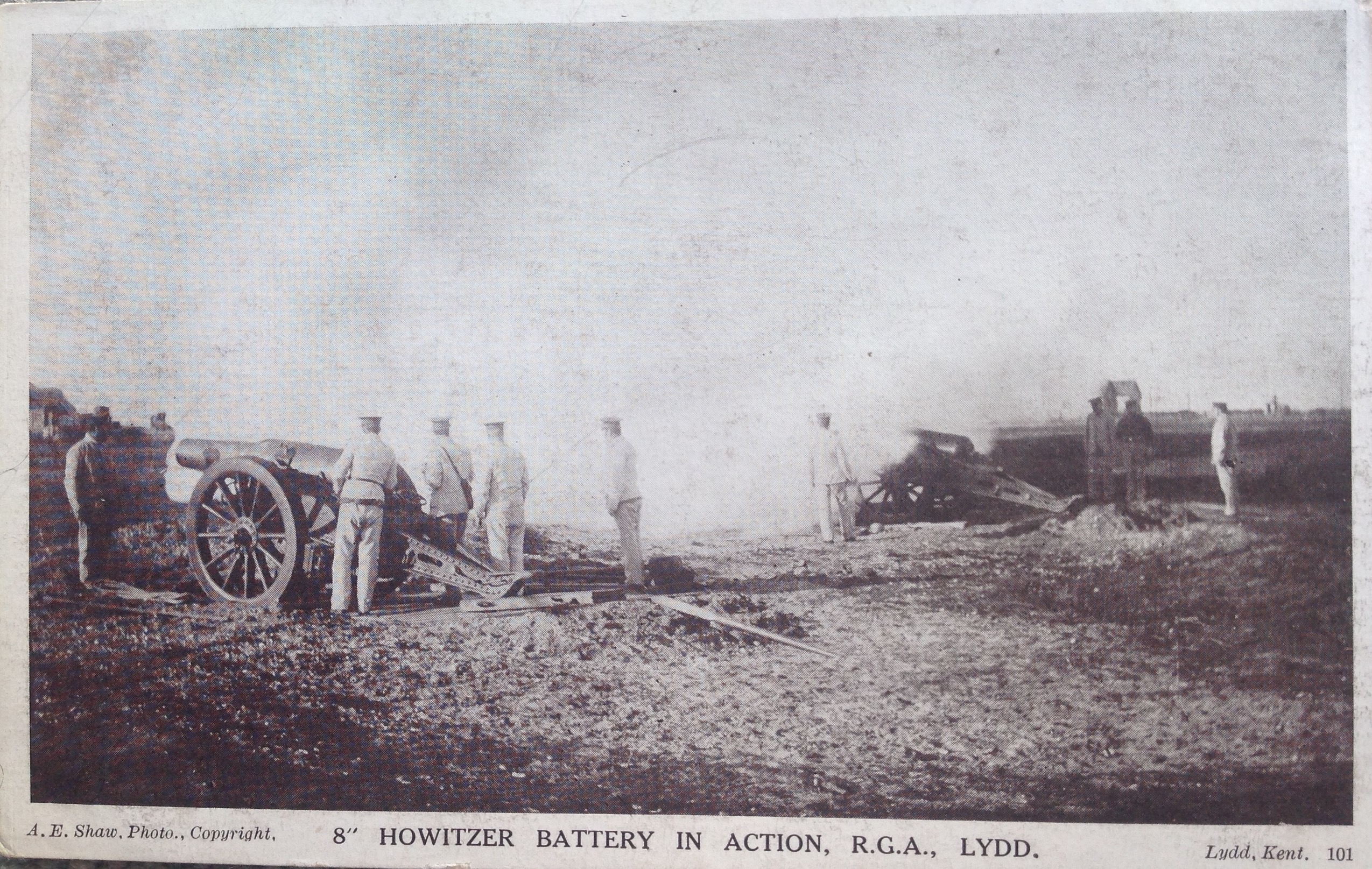
RML 8-inch howitzers of the RGA in action at Lydd, 1903.

A consolidation of the Volunteers saw the 9th KAVC renumbered as the 2nd Kent Artillery Volunteers on 1 July 1880 and it became independent of the Royal Arsenal unit in March 1883. All artillery volunteers were attached to one of the territorial garrison divisions of the Royal Artillery (RA) in 1882, when the 2nd Kent joined the London Division, transferring to the Eastern Division after the London Division was disbanded in 1889. By 1891, the unit had eight companies (Nos 1 and 2 at Lewisham, Nos 3–8 at Plumstead).

By 1893, the War Office Mobilisation Scheme had allocated the 2nd Kent Artillery Volunteers to the Thames fixed defences. From 1897, the Volunteers were issued with 9-pounder RML guns and the 2nd Kent also had 6.6-inch and 8-inch RML siege howitzers as befitted its role as 'position artillery'. These guns were fired on the practice ranges at Lydd during annual summer camps. In 1899 the Artillery Volunteers were attached to the Royal Garrison Artillery (RGA), and when the RA's divisional structure as abolished on 1 January 1902 the unit was redesignated 2nd Kent Brigade, RGA (Volunteers) in the South-Eastern Group. Headquarters (HQ) was at Bloomfield Road, Plumstead, from 1888 to 1905, and at 28 Rhyme Road, Lewisham, and Lewisham High Street from 1905 to 1911.

During the Second Boer War, the 2nd Kent RGA sent a detachment to serve in South Africa with the City Imperial Volunteers.

== Territorial Force ==
When the Volunteers were subsumed into the new Territorial Force (TF) under the Haldane Reforms of 1908, the 2nd Kent RGA was split to form two howitzer brigades in the Royal Field Artillery (RFA), the IV London at Lewisham, and the VIII London at Plumstead. Armed with Breech-loading 5-inch howitzers, these two units were intended to provide indirect fire support for the 1st London and 2nd London Divisions respectively.

The organisation of the IV (or 4th) London was as follows:

4th County of London (Howitzer) Brigade, RFA

- 10th County of London (Howitzer) Battery
- 11th County of London (Howitzer) Battery
- IV London (Howitzer) Brigade Ammunition Column (added 1910)

The new HQ at Ennersdale Road, Lewisham, opened in 1911, was largely paid for by the Honorary Colonel, Sir Thomas Dewey, 1st Bart, president of the Prudential Assurance Company. The brigade won the King's Prize at the National Artillery Association Competition in 1911, and its excellent turnout at annual camps led to the nickname 'The Shiny Fourth'.

By the time the First World War broke out in 1914, TF howitzer batteries were each equipped with four of the obsolescent BL 5-inch howitzers.

== First World War ==
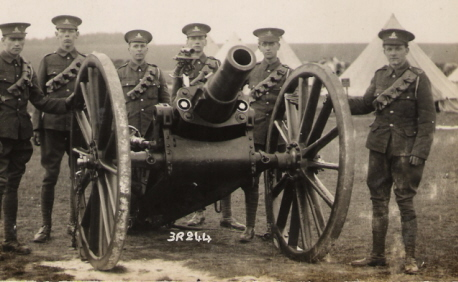
BL 5-inch howitzer and TF gunners in camp before the war

=== Mobilisation ===
Annual training for 1st London Division had just begun when war was declared on 4 August 1914, and the IV London (H) Bde promptly returned from the Redesdale training ranges to Lewisham for mobilisation.

On the outbreak of war, units of the Territorial Force were invited to volunteer for Overseas Service. On 15 August 1914, the War Office issued instructions to separate those men who had signed up for Home Service only, and form these into reserve units. On 31 August, the formation of a Reserve or 2nd Line unit was authorised for each 1st Line unit where 60 per cent or more of the men had volunteered for Overseas Service – the whole of the IV London (H) Bde had done so. The titles of these 2nd Line units would be the same as the original, but distinguished by a '2/' prefix. In this way duplicate battalions, brigades and divisions were created, mirroring those TF formations being sent overseas.

=== 1/IV Brigade ===
Once mobilised, the 1/IV (H) Brigade moved to Stringers Common, Worplesdon, then to Maresfield Park, and eventually to Edinburgh for coast defence duty, where it spent four months in overcrowded conditions. In Spring 1915 it moved to Horsham and East Grinstead.

The infantry of the division had been posted away to relieve Regular Army garrisons in the Mediterranean or to supplement the British Expeditionary Force (BEF) on the Western Front. By early 1915, only the artillery and other support elements of the division remained in England, and these were attached to the 2nd Line TF division (2/1st London Division) that was being organised. The 2/1st London Division formed part of First Army of Central Force guarding the East Coast of England. 1/IV London (H) Bde was billeted at Warren Heath, Ipswich, during the early part of 1915.

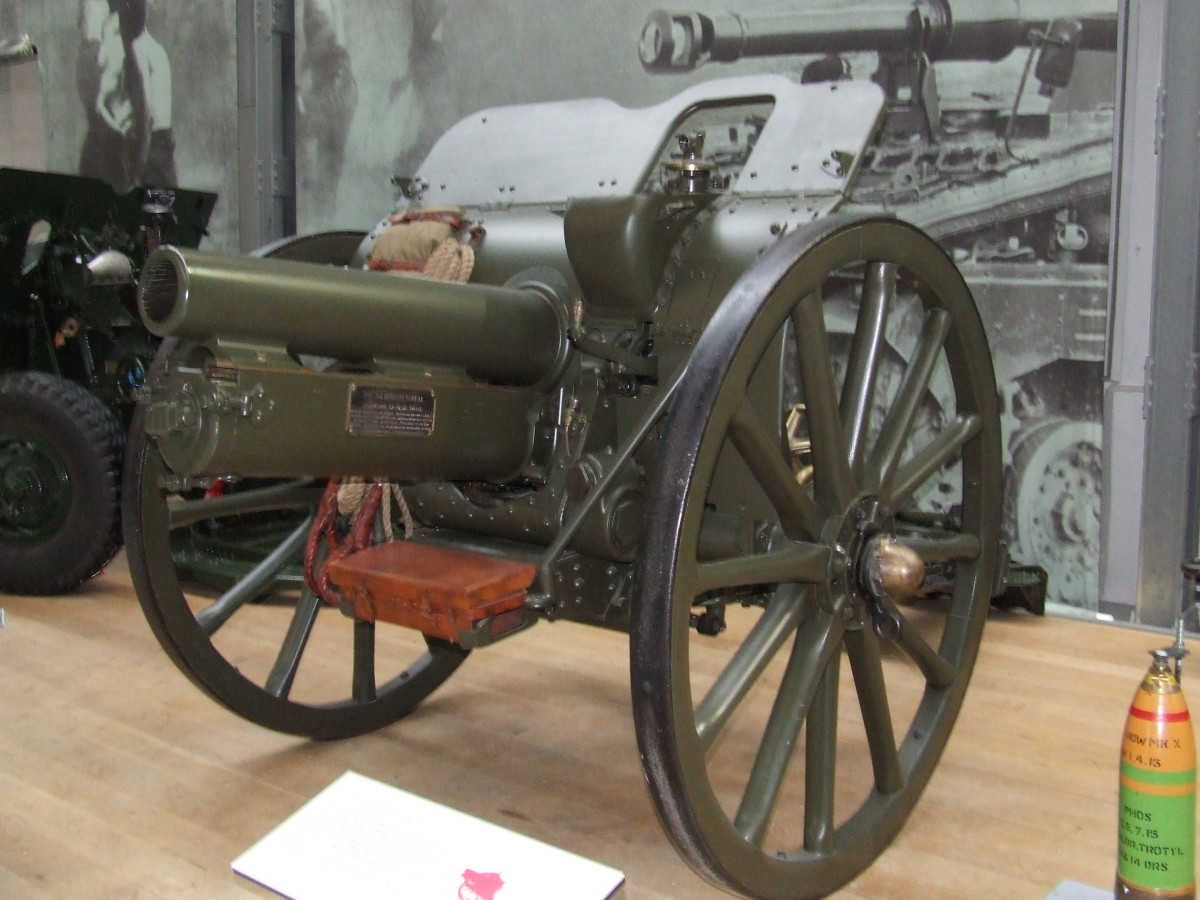
4.5-inch Howitzer at the Royal Artillery Museum.

In August 1915, the 36th (Ulster) Division was being readied for service. Its infantry were largely drawn from the Ulster Volunteers and had already received weapons training before the war; the artillery however were newly raised Londoners, and the drivers were still being taught to mount and dismount from wooden horses. The 1st London Divisional Artillery was therefore attached to the Ulster Division until its own gunners were ready for active service, as was part of 10th (Irish) Division's artillery, which had not gone overseas with its parent division. The 1/IV London Brigade moved to Bordon Camp in September where it was re-equipped with modern 4.5-inch howitzers and was joined by B and C Batteries of LVII (Howitzer) Bde from 10th Division. It accompanied the Ulster Division to France, landing at Le Havre on 4 October 1915, and was in the Line by the middle of the month.

In November 1915, half of the Brigade Ammunition Column (BAC) was sent to reinforce 10th (Irish) Division's Divisional Ammunition Column (DAC) (also attached to 36th (Ulster) Division). On 18 November, the two attached batteries left to rejoin 10th (Irish) Division in the Eastern Mediterranean.

In December, the Ulster Division's artillery arrived from England, and the London Divisional Artillery was transferred to the 38th (Welsh) Division, which had also gone to France minus its own artillery. 1/IV London Bde served with the Welsh Division from 12 December 1915 to 3 January 1916. It was next attached to an ad hoc division of dismounted cavalry, but on 26 February was able to rejoin 1/1st London Division (now numbered 56th (London) Division), which was being reformed in France. The brigade was billeted at Wamlin and Rozieres during March as the reformed division took shape.

On 14 February, B (H) Battery and a subsection of the Brigade Ammunition Column were transferred from the New Army CLXVII (Camberwell) Howitzer Brigade of 33rd Divisional Artillery to 1/IV London (H) Brigade to bring it up to three batteries; it was designated T (H) Battery.

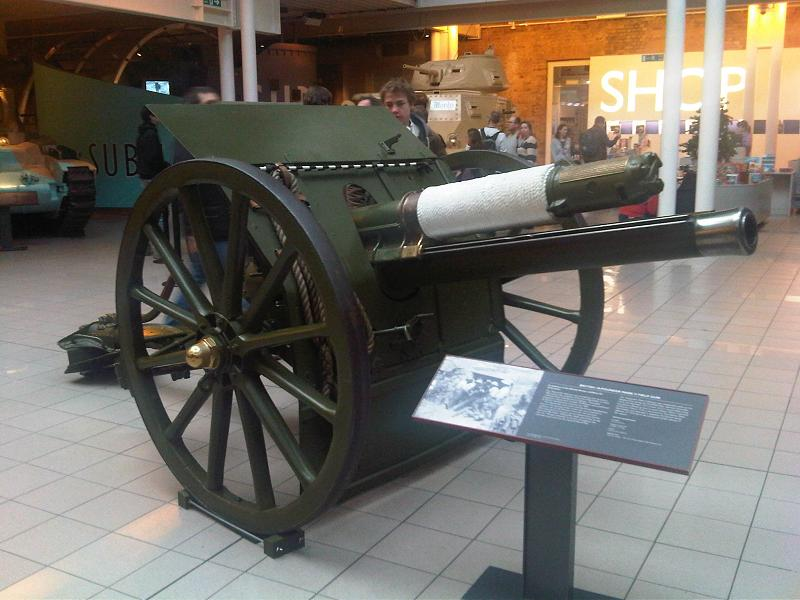
18-pounder Mk II field gun at the Imperial War Museum.

In May 1916, the brigade was completely reorganised. Like the other TF artillery brigades, it was numbered, becoming CCLXXXIII (or 283rd) Brigade, RFA. 10th (H) Bty transferred to CCLXXXI (formerly 1/II London) Bde and 11th (H) Bty to CCLXXX (formerly 1/I London) Bde. In exchange, the brigade received three batteries equipped with 18-pounder field guns which had recently joined the other brigades of the divisional artillery, giving it the following organisation:

CCLXXXIII Brigade, RFA

- A Battery – 93rd Bty from CCLXXX Bde (a Regular battery, from XVIII Brigade, RFA, which had been serving with Indian and Canadian formations)
- B Battery – 109th Bty from CCLXXXI Bde (a Regular battery, from XXIII Brigade, RFA, which had been serving in 3rd Division)
- C Battery – R Battery (previously half of 109 Bty) from CCLXXXII Bde

As part of the same reorganisation, the rest of 1/IV London BAC was transferred to the new 56th Divisional Ammunition Column.

==== Gommecourt ====
The first major action for 283 Brigade came at the Battle of the Somme, and there are detailed accounts of its actions. 56th Division's task for the opening day of the Somme Offensive (the 'Big Push') was to attack the south side of the Gommecourt Salient as a diversion to support the main attack.

283 Brigade was split amongst the different tasks of the divisional artillery: A Bty was with the Northern Group (called 'Southart') under Lt-Col Southam supporting 169th (3rd London) Brigade, 109 Bty was with the Southern Group ('Macart') under Lt-Col Macdowell supporting 168th (2nd London) Brigade, and C Bty was with the Wire Cutting Group ('Peltart') under Lt-Col Prechtel. The batteries began moving into position in late May and then began to register their targets during June.

The role of the Southart and Macart Groups was to 'search' the enemy trenches, villages, woods and hollows while the Peltart Group attempted to cut the wire using Shrapnel shell. One section (two guns) of C/283 Bty was the closest to the German lines, in an orchard on the edge of the British-held village of Hébuterne, firing over Open sights at the wire and a German position at Point 94 in the south-east corner of Gommecourt. 109 Bty with the Macart Group was about 500 yards from Hébuterne, beside the road from Sailly and just over 3000 yards from the German trenches.

Five days of intense bombardment were planned leading up to the attack, designated U, V, W, X and Y days, but the whole attack was delayed by two days, so there was seven days of bombardment culminating in Z Day on 1 July. The two additional days were used for Interdiction of enemy movement and repairs, to complete the wire-cutting and counter-battery tasks, and to deceive the enemy. The wear on the guns and the unexpected ammunition expenditure meant that after the intended peak on Y Day (28 June) the firing actually fell away on the additional Y1 and Y2 Days, giving the defenders time to reorganise and repair their wire.

The division's batteries and observation posts (OPs) also suffered from German counter-battery fire. The section of C/283 Bty hidden at the edge of Hébuterne was causing considerable damage to the trenches and wire round Gommecourt Park and came in for particular attention from German shelling, but was never located.

Each afternoon, the bombardment paused between 16.00 and 16.30 to allow a BE2c aircraft of No. 8 Squadron, Royal Flying Corps, to photograph the German positions. Analysis of these pictures on 30 June revealed large areas of uncut wire, especially in the centre of the area to be attacked by 56th Division. Night patrols confirmed these reports.

Each day of the firing programme had included an intense bombardment starting at 06.25, reaching a crescendo at 07.20 and lifting at 07.45; on Z Day (1 July) this lifted 15 minutes earlier than usual, in an attempt to deceive the enemy. 56th Divisional artillery was allocated 11,600 rounds for this final 65 minutes, amounting to 3 rounds per minute for each 18-pounder gun and 4.5-inch howitzer. A smoke screen was laid at 07.25, and under its cover the infantry went 'over the top' and assembled in No man's land. Then at Zero Hour, 07.30, the guns lifted to pre-arranged targets in the German support and reserve lines while the infantry began their assault.

Having reverted to divisional control at Zero Hour, the 18-pounders had very short lifts, almost amounting to a creeping barrage. The first lift was onto the German reserve trench, on which they fired for four minutes, then they fired for six minutes just beyond it, and then swept the communication trenches for 12 minutes. Next, they shifted to the second objective for eight minutes. This programme was intended to conform to the infantry's plan of attack.

At first, this went well for 56th Division. Despite casualties from the German counter-bombardment on their jumping-off trenches, the smoke and morning mist helped the infantry and they reached the German front line with little loss and moved on towards the second and reserve lines. The artillery OPs reported the signboards erected by the leading waves to mark their progress. On some parts of the front, the wire was inadequately cut, causing the troops to bunch to get through gaps and become disorganised. The German began counter-attacking about an hour after Zero, and their heavy barrage on No man's land and their own front trenches made it almost impossible for reinforcements and supplies to be got forward to the assaulting battalions, who were now cut off. On the other side of the Gommecourt Salient, the assault of the 46th (North Midland) Division was a disaster, bogged down in mud and uncut wire, and the defenders could turn all their attention to the 56th Division.

Although VII Corps' heavy guns and 56th Division's howitzers tried to suppress the German artillery, and the 18-pounders fired pre-arranged barrages to block some of the counter-attacks coming down communication trenches, the situation was too confused for the OPs and spotter aircraft to allow the divisional artillery to provide close support for the infantry. Several of the field guns were also out of action with broken springs. Even when repaired, the guns had to conserve ammunition later in the day.

At about 13.00, the isolated battalions in the German lines began to crumble, and by 16.00 they only held the German front line trench. By nightfall, all of the 56th Division's gains had been reduced to a single stretch of trench, and this had to be abandoned after dark.

The attack at Gommecourt had only been a diversion, so it was not continued after the first day., and 56th Division remained in position, holding its original line. On 13 July, the divisional artillery made a demonstration to help the continuing Somme Offensive, and on 17 July the infantry made raids on the enemy line, but otherwise the period was quiet. On 20 August it was relieved and moved south to rejoin the main offensive.

Thereafter CCLXXXIII Bde supported 56th Division in the following actions of the Somme Offensive:

- Battle of Ginchy, 9 September
- Battle of Flers-Courcelette, 15–22 September
- Battle of Morval, 25–27 September
- Capture of Combles, 26 September
- Battle of the Transloy Ridges, 1–9 October

283 Brigade was broken up between the other RFA brigades of 56th Division on 5 November 1916. The original 1/10th and 1/11th London (H) Batteries continued to fight as D (H)/281 and D (H)/280 respectively until the Armistice with Germany.

=== 2/IV Brigade ===
Recruits joined 2/IV London (Howitzer) Brigade at Ennersdale Road, where they trained for a year under Lt-Col E.W. Finch, a veteran of the Anglo-Zulu War who had commanded 10th (London) Bty before the war. The unit itself volunteered for overseas service and sent some drafts to the 1/IV Bde. It joined 58th (2/1st London) Division at Warren Heath, Ipswich, on 24 September 1915, replacing the 1/IV Bde. At this stage the division's artillery units were split up among many small towns and villages in Suffolk to provide billets for the men and sufficient forage for the horses.

In the spring of 1916, when 58th Division took over a section of the East Coast defences, the brigade received modern 4.5-inch howitzers and was renumbered CCXCIII (293) Bde. In July the division moved to Salisbury Plain for final battle training. Here, 2/11th London (H) Bty was assigned to CCXC (290, formerly 2/I London) Bde, and in August CCXCIII Bde was joined by 1/Shropshire Battery and 1/Glamorgan Battery of the Royal Horse Artillery, which had been left in Britain when their parent Welsh Border and South Wales Mounted Brigades had sailed for Egypt in March. Re-equipped as field artillery with four 18-pounders each, they became A and B Batteries respectively, brought up to six guns (with a section from a 2nd Line Sussex battery in the case of the Shropshire RHA). Brigade ammunition columns were abolished at this time, the men of the Glamorgan, Shropshire and London Ammunition Columns finding themselves in the 58th Divisional Trench Mortar Brigade. For six months the brigade provided the depot batteries for the Overseas Artillery School at Larkhill, gaining exceptional experience in live firing before going overseas.

58th Division embarked for France at the beginning of 1917, CCXCIII Bde landing at Le Havre on 22 January. It was immediately detached from the division and became an 'Army Brigade', for which role it gained a third 18-pounder battery (B/CCLXXXVII (2/III West Lancashire RFA) joined from 57th (2nd West Lancashire) Division on 17 March 1917) and reformed its own Brigade Ammunition Column, including a motorised ammunition sub-park, and a signal section, giving it the following organisation:

CCXCIII Brigade, RFA

- A Battery – previously 1/1st Bty Shropshire Royal Horse Artillery
- B Battery – previously 1/1st Bty Glamorganshire Royal Horse Artillery
- C Battery – previously 2/13th Lancashire Bty from CCLXXXVII Bde of 57th (2nd West Lancashire) Division
- D (H) Battery – previously 2/10th London (H) Bty
- CCXCIII Brigade Ammunition Column
- CCXCIII Brigade Signal Section

The role of an Army Brigade was to act as a mobile reserve to strengthen divisional artilleries as required. By the end of the war, CCXCIII Bde (codenamed 'Buffalo') had supported 23 different divisions, in all sectors of the British front, often moving at short notice.

One of the officers of 2/13th Lancashire Bty was 2/Lt John Morley Stebbings, a Kentish man who had won the Edward Medal leading a rescue party of eight men from his battery into the ruins of the Uplees explosives factory near Faversham after the Great Explosion on 2 April 1916. He subsequently won a Military Cross (MC) on the Western Front and in the Second World War, commanded the Sittingbourne-based 89th (Cinque Ports) Heavy Anti-Aircraft Regiment and later 1st Anti-Aircraft Brigade in North Africa

==== Scarpe ====
For Third Army's forthcoming Arras Offensive, CCXCIII Bde was attached to 56th (1/1st London) Division. The Germans partly forestalled this offensive by withdrawing to the Hindenburg Line, but near Arras they only went back a short distance to a new line behind Neuville Vitasse. The bombardment began on 4 April. CCXCIII's main task before the attack was wire-cutting; then on 8 April a rehearsal of the barrage was carried out with an unlimited supply of ammunition and the barrage proper on 9 April. 56th Division attacked Neuville Vitasse at 07.45 on 9 April with tank support, leapfrogging its battalions across successive objectives. Within half an hour, the Shropshire Battery was ordered forward, the gun teams already waiting. Although the movement was observed by the enemy and shelled, by 10.00 the whole divisional artillery had moved across the old German front line to within 1,000 yards of Neuville Vitasse, with ammunition brought up, ready to fire the barrage for the assault on the Hindenburg main line. This second phase began at 12.10 and after two hours 56th Division was through the Hindenburg front line, but its flanks were in the air and further progress was slow. The Shropshire Battery moved into the sugar refinery in Neuville Vitasse on 10 April, but as the battle moved on it was left out of range. This phase of the Battle of Arras (the 1st Battle of the Scarpe) ended on 16 April.

During the next stages of the Arras offensive, CCXCIII Bde was variously attached to 56th, 9th (Scottish), 34th, and 31st Divisions. At one stage German counter-attacks reached to within 1,000 yards of the battery positions and the guns were prepared for individual defence before the enemy attack was halted and the battery positions could be shifted back. After further spells supporting 2nd Canadian, 7th and 62nd (2nd West Riding) Divisions during the closing stages of the Arras offensive, the brigade was withdrawn to a relatively quiet location in the St Quentin sector. Although the Shropshire Battery was shelled out of its first position, it relocated to a well-camouflaged site behind a sugar factory and remained there unmolested.

==== Ypres ====
After this quiet spell, the brigade was moved up to the Ypres Salient, where it supported 17th (Northern) and 18th (Eastern) Divisions for the last six weeks of the Battle of Passchendaele. Guns had to be provided with wooden platforms to avoid sinking into the mud, and were devoid of cover or camouflage, the gunners sheltering in captured German pillboxes when not serving the guns.

==== Spring Offensive ====
After Christmas 1917, the brigade moved into the Bapaume sector, under IV Corps. The opening of the German spring offensive on 21 March 1918 found the CCXCIII Bde supporting 51st (Highland) Division in Third Army. The brigade responded to SOS signals from the infantry in front, bringing down 'unbearable' fire on the attacking troops, but OPs were overrun and the Germans penetrated the division's Battle Zone and reached the village of Doignies. Two batteries of the brigade had to evacuate this village quickly, and the Shropshire Battery's guns had to be hauled out of their pits to concentrate fire on the village, when they were seen and machine-gunned by German aircraft. The gunners fired over open sights to cover the withdrawal of the infantry, then became involved in close fighting themselves, defending their gun pits with rifle fire. During the confused fighting C Battery's guns were in action for an hour with no infantry in front of them, while B Battery's guns were out of action, the sights and breechblocks removed to prevent their use by the enemy. The Highlanders improvised a defence line along the rear of their Battle Zone and the Germans failed to break through. The gunners made attempts by night to carry off their guns. The batteries remained under continuous shellfire throughout 22 March, and retired in the evening when German infantry were within 500 yards. Next morning the new Shropshire battery position came under machine-gun fire and became untenable, the guns having to be destroyed where they stood. Two fresh guns were brought up from the waggon lines that evening, and the Shropshire battery moved to Foncquevillers, from where it sent out mounted patrols to locate the enemy in front. After further withdrawals, the brigade reached the area round Essarts before going into Corps reserve. The brigade's horses were only off-saddled twice in six days. During this period, CCXCIII Army Bde had been supporting 42nd (East Lancashire) and 51st (Highland) Divisions, and received thanks from the commander of 154th (3rd Highland) Brigade: 'I doubt if artillery ever had greater difficulties to meet – there were certainly occasions when your guns had no knowledge as to whether the nearest thing in front of them was not the advancing German infantry'. The brigade won seven MCs and 10 Military Medals (MMs).

D (H) Bty was made up to six howitzers on 29 April 1918.

==== Hundred Days' offensive ====
After a week's rest, the brigade was sent to support the New Zealand Division's defences, and later carried out training in open warfare, including anti-tank gunnery. On the night of 19 August the guns were taken back to Essarts, where they were carefully emplaced and camouflaged to support the British attack of 21 August (Second Battle of the Somme (1918)). After firing a two-hour standing barrage to support the advancing infantry and tanks, the guns were out of range and had to be moved up with difficulty over the old Somme battlefield. This process being repeated over several days, through Bapaume, sometimes under fire from enemy aircraft. During this advance, CCXCIII Army Field Bde acted as divisional artillery successively with the 51st, 5th, 11th (Northern) and New Zealand divisions.

CCXCIII Brigade was next transferred to the Canadian Corps in First Army. After two weeks' rest, the guns moved into position to fire across the Canal du Nord. The Canadians launched their attack (the Battle of the Canal du Nord) behind a huge creeping barrage on 27 September and then continued towards Cambrai on 8 October, the infantry attack being preceded by a seven-hour bombardment continued until the guns were left behind out of range.

After a move to Vimy, the brigade followed the advance across the strong Drocourt-Quéant Line, which had been abandoned by the Germans, to Auby. The Shropshire Battery was the first to cross the Scarpe Canal. It then moved via Saint-Amand-les-Eaux to Haute-Rive, where it fired its last shots of the war. At the Armistice, CCXCIII Bde was serving with First Army.

=== 3/IV Brigade ===
3/IV Brigade was formed at Lewisham once the 2/IV had reached full strength and volunteered for overseas service. At first it acted as a depot sending drafts to the 1/IV and 2/IV, later as a home defence unit. From Ennersdale Road, the unit moved to Dulwich swimming baths, then in 1916 to Winchester. There, the unit was merged with other 3rd Line howitzer brigades to form No 7 Artillery Training School, later No 7 Howitzer Reserve Brigade at Bordon. The HQ at Ennersdale Road continued, as No 43 Depot, RFA, to send drafts to the IV and VIII (H) brigades until conscription took effect in 1917.

== Interwar years ==
The TF was reconstituted on 7 February 1920, and 4th London Brigade was reformed at Lewisham. In the following year, the TF was reorganised as the Territorial Army (TA), and the unit was redesignated 91st (4th London) Brigade. It was once again in 56th (1st London) Division. After the RFA merged into the Royal Artillery (RA) in 1924, the brigade had the following organisation:

91st (4th London) Field Brigade, RA

- 361st (5th London) Field Battery
- 362nd (6th London) Field Battery
- 363rd (7th London) Field Battery
- 364th (8th London) Field Battery (Howitzers)

The brigade received its first motor vehicles in June 1928, when four Morris six wheel gun tractors were issued to each of the 361st and 363rd Btys. This was followed in 1930 by a reduction in battery establishment strengths since fewer drivers were required than with horses.

In 1935, the 47th (2nd London) Division was converted into an anti-aircraft division, and its surplus units merged into the 56th (1st London) Division. At this point, 91st (4th London) Brigade left the division and became an Army Brigade. On 1 November 1938, the RA adopted the designation 'regiment' in place of 'brigade'.

With the expansion of the TA after the Munich Crisis, most regiments formed duplicates. In the case of 91st, this produced 139th Field Regiment on 27 April 1939, resulting in the following reorganisation:

91st (4th London) Field Regiment, RA

- 361 (5th London) Fd Bty
- 363 (7th London) Fd Bty

139th Field Regiment, RA

- 362 (6th London) Fd Bty
- 364 (8th London) Fd Bty

Both regiments were headquartered at Lewisham (with 139th Fd Rgt occupying wooden huts in the grounds of the drill hall), and held a joint annual camp at Beaulieu, Hampshire, during the summer of 1939.

Field regiments were now organised as Regimental HQ (RHQ) and two batteries each of 12 guns in three Troops. These were 18-pounders of First World War-era pattern, though now equipped with pneumatic tyres and towed by motorised gun tractors. There was a programme to replace the 18-pdr barrels with that of the new 25-pounder coming into service, giving the hybrid 18/25-pounder.

== Second World War ==
=== 91st (4th London) Field Regiment ===
==== Mobilisation ====
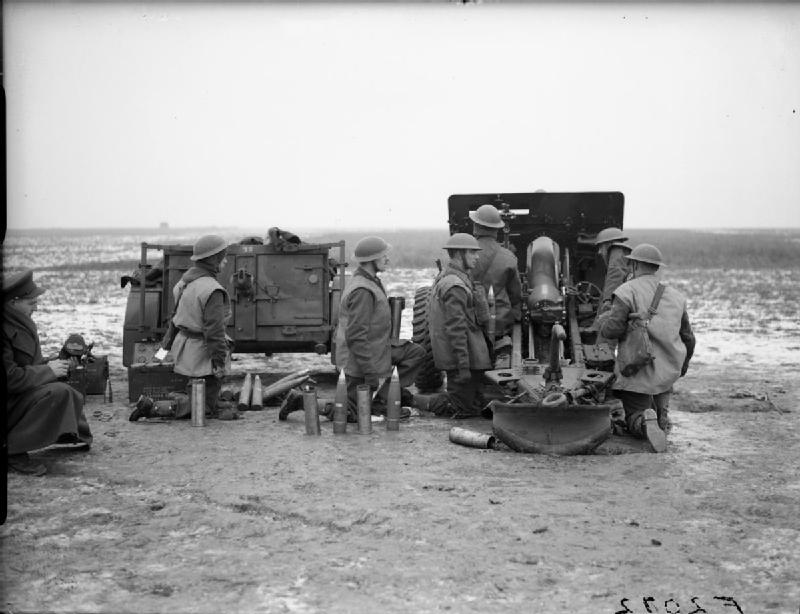
A 25-pdr of 361 Battery, 91st (4th London) Field Regiment, Royal Artillery, at Oppy near Vimy, 7 January 1940 (IWM F2072)

91st (4th London) Field Regiment mobilised on 1 September, two days before the declaration of war, and moved to Kempton Park Racecourse. It was issued with eight new 25-pounders, which with its existing 18/25-pounders brought it up to full strength. The regiment sailed for France on 3 and 5 October. For the next three months of the Phoney War, the regiment served as Corps Troops with II Corps of the British Expeditionary Force (BEF), deploying round Auchy-les-Mines near Lille. When the 5th Division was formed in December the regiment joined it, and continued serving with it throughout the war.

==== Dunkirk ====
During the Norwegian Campaign, 5th Division was pulled out of the line and warned for a transfer to Norway, so that when the Battle of France began on 10 May, the division was in reserve. The BEF started its advance north into Belgium to defend the line of the Dyle in accordance with 'Plan D', and 5th Division reached as far as Brussels. But the German Army broke through the Ardennes to the east, forcing the BEF to withdraw again to the line of the Escaut. The regiment fired its first shots on 17 May when its gunners used Bren guns to shoot down a low-flying German aircraft.

By 20 May, the division formed part of 'Frankforce', helping to defend a south-facing salient around Arras. On 22 May, 5th and 7th Panzer Divisions prepared to cross the River Scarpe from the west. 5th Divisional artillery was concentrated, with 91st Fd Rgt at Gavrelle, and did 'much execution' to the attackers, 91st Fd Rgt destroying a German bridging train as it came down to the river. Two guns were knocked out by direct hits and shortly afterwards the regiment's gunners became engaged in hand-to-hand fighting with some of the German infantry who had got across. By late afternoon, on 23 May, the enemy were across in strength, despite having their bridges destroyed several times by the gunners. At last light, Frankforce was ordered to hold out to the last round, but the situation in Arras was now hopeless and the BEF's commander, Lord Gort changed the orders at midnight, directing Frankforce to move north out of the salient as quickly as possible. 91st Fd Rgt began a 'nightmare' withdrawal down the only road, which was being used by two divisions. Nevertheless, most of the garrison got away to new defensive positions on the canal between Béthune and La Bassée.

On 26 May, Frankforce was rushed further north to plug a gap in the line left by the retreating Belgian army. 5th Division only arrived at the last minute, with the positions they were to occupy south of Ypres already under German shellfire. On that day Gort made the decision to evacuate the BEF from Dunkirk (Operation Dynamo). The guns of 5th Division were in action under heavy fire during the Battle of the Ypres–Comines Canal, first at Ploegsteert, then on the Yser, until 29 May. Most of the division then withdrew to the inner perimeter and embarked for England, but two field regiments were required to stay behind to bolster 50th (Northumbrian) Division's defences for a further 24 hours, and it was not until early on 1 June that the last Troop of 91st Fd Rgt in action destroyed their remaining equipment and were evacuated.

==== Home Defence ====
While reforming after Dunkirk, 5th Division was posted to Scottish Command. 91st Field Rgt reassembled at Turriff, moved to Peterhead and then to Abercairny, where it was issued with some iron-tyred French 75 mm guns, which were transported aboard 3-tonner lorries. Later some 25-pounders arrived in ones and twos, but for some time some Troops were used as infantry. On 29 October 1940 it moved down to Southport to join III Corps in Western Command, where it stayed (except for a month in Northern Ireland in April 1941) until 1942. It was only in the autumn of 1940 that the RA began producing enough battery staffs to start the process of changing regiments from a two-battery to a three-battery organisation. (Three 8-gun batteries were easier to handle, and it meant that each infantry battalion in a brigade could be closely associated with its own battery.) 91st Field Rgt formed 466 Bty on 14 January 1941.

In January 1942, the division passed under direct War Office control preparatory to embarking for overseas service, and 91st Fd Rgt moved to Beckenham for final training.

==== Madagascar, India, Persia ====
5th Division embarked for India, 91st Fd Rgt sailing on 23 March 1942 with 13th Brigade aboard the Franconia. En route the division was diverted and between 23 April and 19 May 1942 91st Fd Rgt was detached with 13th Bde to Force 121 for the invasion of Vichy French-controlled Madagascar (Operation Ironclad). However, the campaign was quickly over, and 91st Fd Rgt's guns were never disembarked. It then rejoined the rest of the division, arriving in Bombay on 29 May. Conditions aboard the Franconia had been bad, and many of the men were sick and evacuated to hospital immediately on landing.

The regiment concentrated at Ahmednagar and then moved across India to Ranchi (the base area for the Burma Campaign), the men by rail and the guns and vehicles by road. After less than three months in India, 5th Division was diverted again, this time to Persia, which was threatened by the German advance on the Caucasus. The division embarked for Basra and proceeded by road via Baghdad into Persia, where it spent the winter near Teheran. The threat to Persia having been diverted by the Battle of Stalingrad, 5th Division was next earmarked as an assault division for the Allied invasion of Sicily (Operation Husky). It proceeded via Baghdad and Damascus where it trained for amphibious landings and mountain warfare. It moved to the Suez Canal zone of Egypt in June, and embarked on 5 July.

==== Sicily ====
The regiment landed in Sicily on 9 July 1943, some 6–8 hours after the initial landings, and advanced with 5th Division up the east coast to the plain of Catania. Here the division was held up by strong defence: on 18 July, 15th Bde was unable to advance beyond the Simeto bridgehead despite powerful artillery support. The division remained under fire from the foothills until Eighth Army's flanking forces caused a German withdrawal that saw the division 'chasing his troops round the slopes of Mount Etna'. At this stage, 5th Division was withdrawn from the fighting to prepare for the invasion of mainland Italy (Operation Baytown).

==== Italy ====
5th Division landed at Reggio di Calabria on 3 September 1943, covered by artillery fire from the opposite side of the Straits of Messina, and then advanced up the coast road to meet US Fifth Army. There was little opposition apart from demolitions and rearguard actions. Fifth Army then advanced up Italy, with 5th Division in the Apennines where the gunners' training in mountain warfare paid off. The division's advance was halted at Rionero when the Allies were held up at Monte Cassino and a succession of defended river lines.

During this winter stalemate, 5th Division was transferred to the east coast to assist the Canadians at Ortona and New Zealanders at Orsogna. These attacks were only moderately successful, so 5th Division was switched again, back to the west coast to cross the mouth of the Garigliano and outflank Cassino. The division's 'silent' assault crossing (without artillery fire) on the night of 17/18 January 1944 using beach landing techniques was successful in establishing a firm bridgehead that was held against enemy counter-attacks with the support of the guns, but without further troops it was impossible to advance further. 91st Field Rgt had to occupy positions in full view of enemy OPs and suffered a number of casualties.

In March, the division was sent to Anzio to relieve another division. 91st Field Rgt was engaged in the same kind of defensive fire tasks, counter-battery fire and barrages for local attacks or counter-attacks. The war became mobile again after the capture of Cassino in May 1944, and 5th Division followed the retreating Germans as far as the Tiber before it was withdrawn for rest.

==== North West Europe ====
5th Division handed over its guns and equipment to the newly arrived 46th Division and embarked for Egypt. After a period of rest and reorganisation in Palestine from July 1944 to February 1945, 5th Division was chosen for Operation Goldflake whereby troops from the Mediterranean theatre were transferred to reinforce 21st Army Group fighting in the final stages of the Campaign in North West Europe. The division began to arrive at Taranto in Italy in mid-February and then re-embarked at Naples to be shipped to Marseilles on 8 March. It was concentrated near Ghent by 19 March.

The division had not re-equipped in time for the Crossing of the Rhine, but took part in a number of actions during the pursuit to the Elbe. During the assault crossing of that river on 29 April, 91st Fd Rgt and the rest of the divisional artillery fired in support of 15th (Scottish) Division – the last set-piece bombardment of the war – and then 5th Division passed through the bridgehead they had secured. By now there was only scattered resistance and thousands of prisoners were collected. The CO of 91st Fd Rgt, with his driver and adjutant, took the surrender of an entire German field regiment. Hostilities ended on VE Day.

91st (4th London) Field Regiment served for a while in the occupation forces in German (British Army of the Rhine) until it was placed in suspended animation on 18 May 1946.

=== 139th (4th London) Field Regiment ===
==== Mobilisation ====
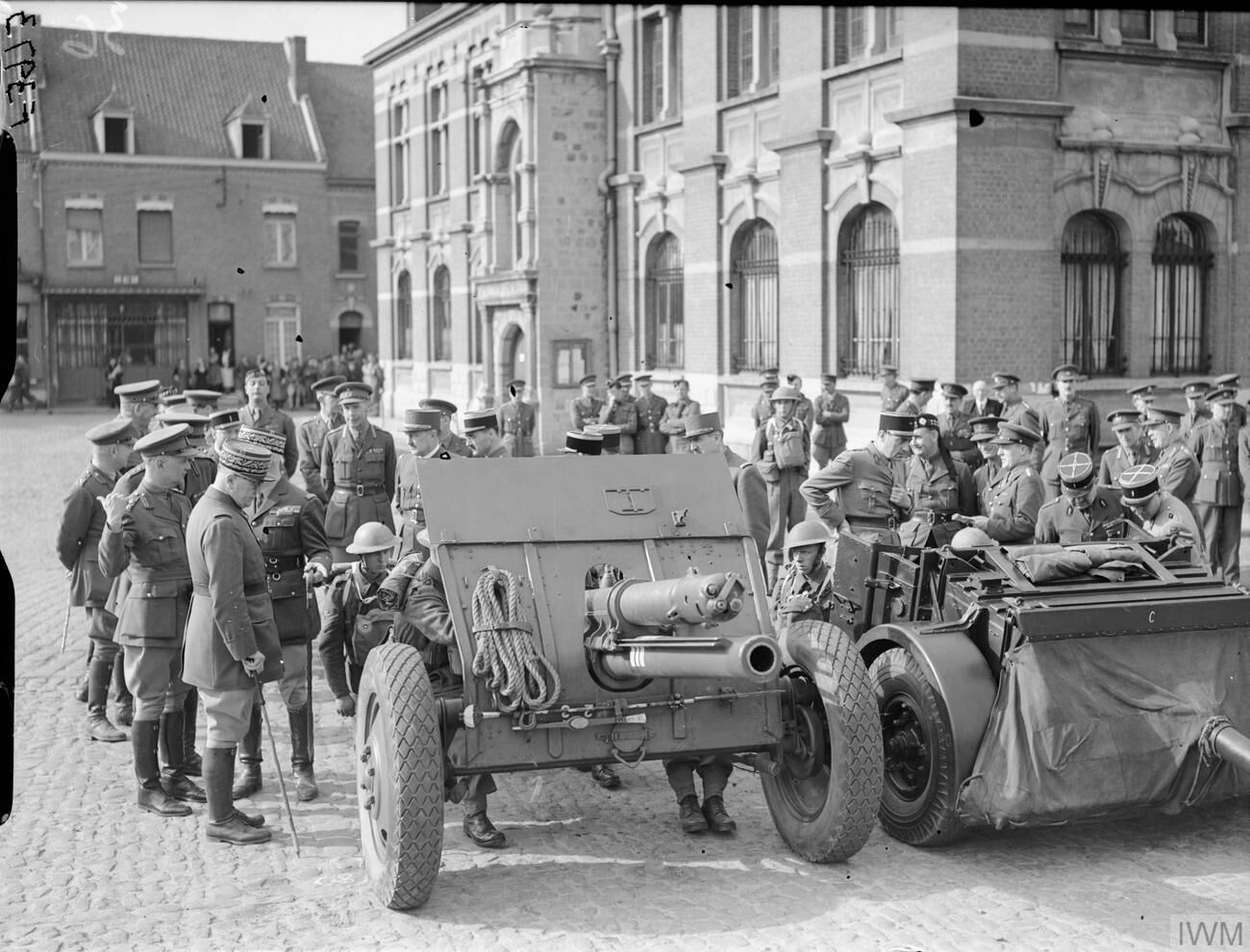
18-Pounder being inspected in France, April 1940.

139th Field Regiment mobilised at Lewisham on 1 September 1939 and after a week moved to Mill Hill where the men were billetted in private houses with clubs and church halls use as messes and cookhouses. Training began with the equipment available: two 4.5-inch howitzers per Troop and a few requisitioned civilian vehicles. In November the regiment moved to requisitioned buildings in Gloucestershire, with RHQ and 362nd Bty at Tetbury and 364th Bty at Westonbirt House. First World War-vintage 18-pounder Mk II guns on pneumatic wheels replaced the 4.5-inch howitzers, a few Bedford 15-cwt trucks and Morris Quad gun-tractors arrived, and the regiment trained to a standard of efficiency to join the BEF in France, one of the few 2nd Line TA units to do so. It embarked at Southampton on 9 April 1940.

==== Dunkirk ====
139th Field Regiment landed at Le Havre on 11 April 1940 to join the BEF as an Army Field Regiment in GHQ Troops attached to III Corps.

When the Battle of France began, the regiment saw its first action in the defence of the Escaut Canal near Oudenaarde, where it had five guns deployed forward in an anti-tank role. On 20 May it stopped the enemy crossing opposite 131st Brigade, but lost the five forward guns that could not be withdrawn under enemy fire.

On 26 May, the 2nd Division of I Corps had struggled to contain a German bridgehead across the Canal Line at St Venant. 139th Field Regiment arrived to help and on 27 May was in action south of the River Lys from Merville to Lestrem, one of its officers being captured by enemy tanks. At La Gorgue, close to Estaires, the CO, Lt-Col G. Ames, found an 18-pounder of 10th Field Regiment, took it to the main street of the village, some 200 yards from the bridge, and engaged enemy field guns while observing from an attic. A section of 139th Fd Rgt then arrived and engaged the enemy approaching the bridge, losing an officer killed. The CO then took these guns into Lestrem and stopped an enemy tank attack at 500 yards with a direct hit. Meanwhile, another gun under 2/Lt Crow destroyed several tanks at La Couture. 2nd Division, with the help of 139th Fd Rgt, had kept open the BEF's line of retreat to the Lys for the whole day.

Later, while withdrawing to Poperinghe, the regiment met more tanks and one gun unlimbered, dropped into action, and drove them off. Described by the corps history as 'this splendid regiment', 139th Fd Rgt still had five guns in action on the Dunkirk beaches at Malo-les-Bains on 2 June and these were among the last to engage the enemy before the final evacuations.

==== Home defence ====
The regiment reformed at Rhos-on-Sea in North Wales and then moved to Llanfairfechan, where it undertook coast defence duty with 200 rifles and some Mark I 18-pounders; later six 4.5-inch howitzers arrived. As an experienced unit, the regiment provided a cadre to 130th (Lowland) Fd Rgt to impart that experience. By the end of the year the regiment had moved to Wrexham where a third battery ('Middle Battery') was formed 9 December 1940 from one Troop from each of the existing batteries, together with 60 raw recruits from Liverpool. This battery was designated 503 Bty on 27 January 1941.while it was stationed at Overton. The regiment was once again attached (with its Signal Section of the Royal Corps of Signals) to III Corps as part of Western Command.

Early in 1941, the regiment moved to Pembrokeshire, with RHQ at Tenby, and trained at Sennybridge with infantry formations, before moving to Pontypridd. By November 1941, the regiment finally had a full complement of 24 18/25-pounders and in December it moved to Eastern England for coastal defence under Eastern Command with one battery overlooking Southend Pier. On 17 February 1942, the regiment gained its '4th London' subtitle. That month it moved to Felixstowe where it received modern 25-pounders and then in June it came under War Office control preparatory to embarking for overseas service.

==== India ====
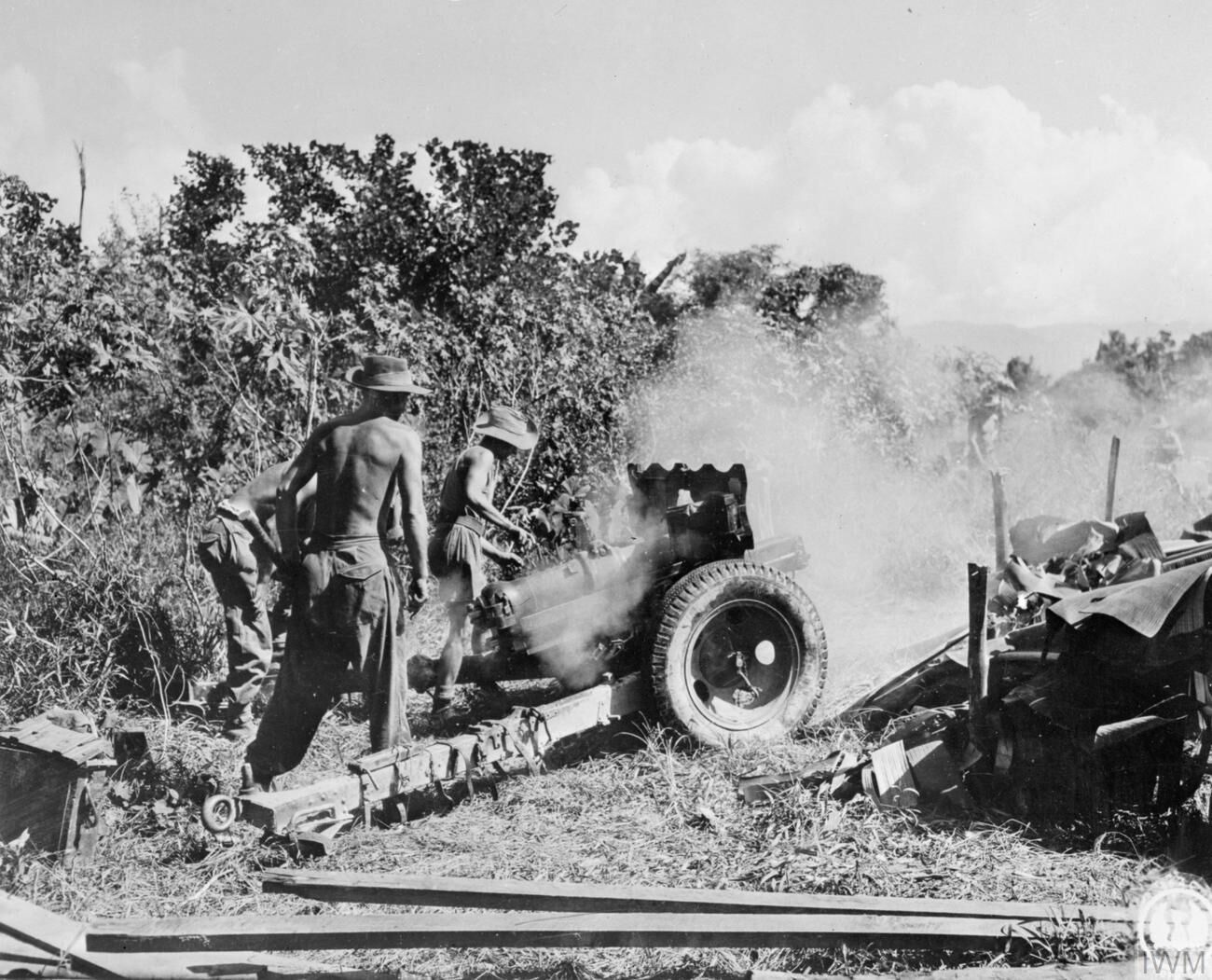
3.7-inch Howitzer in action in Burma, 1944.

During the voyage, the ship carrying the regiment's guns and equipment was sunk by enemy action off the coast of Africa. The regiment therefore had to be re-equipped when it arrived in India. It landed at Bombay on 17 October 1942 and moved to Havelian, where it joined 7th Indian Infantry Division, training for operations in Egypt. A month later the division moved to Nowshera. Early in the new year, it moved to Jubbulpore and in May 1943 to Ranchi, the base for operations in Burma.

In July 1943, the regiment was converted into a Jungle Field Regiment, 362 Bty equipped with 16 x 3-inch mortars and each of the other two batteries with 8 x 3.7-inch howitzers. The whole regiment was towed by or carried in Jeeps. In August, it was moved via Madras to the Arakan coastal area in Burma.

==== Battle of the Admin Box ====
Preparations for an Allied offensive in the Arakan began in late 1943. 7th Indian Division was east of the Mayu range by mid-November, but 139th Jungle Fd Rgt (as it was officially designated from 24 October 1943) had to remain on the west side of the Ngakyedauk Pass (known as 'Okeydoke Pass') until the engineers had built a road fit for Jeep traffic in mid-December. It moved into the Kalapanzin valley to help 33rd Indian Infantry Brigade, which was under considerable pressure. Once the Ngakyedauk Pass was fully open in January 1944, 7th Indian Division began building up an administrative and logistic base at Sinzweya, known as the 'Admin Box'. It was then ordered to capture Buthidaung, which necessitated seizing a feature codenamed 'Able' that overlooked the road. The task was given to 2nd Battalion King's Own Scottish Borderers of 89th Indian Infantry Brigade, supported by 364 Bty of 139th Jungle Rgt, under Maj Robin Powell. The assault was timed for the night of 18/19 January. Powell was authorised to call down all the corps and divisional artillery in range from his OP, and it was the heaviest and most concentrated artillery attack made so far in the Burma Campaign. When the infantry were held up, the Forward Observation Officer brought down fire from 364 Bty so accurately that the Japanese position was destroyed. The infantry then dug in, and artillery fire was brought down to break up Japanese counter-attacks. On 22/23 January there was a 'furious' all-night artillery duel between 364 Bty and the Japanese artillery, but the whole position was in Allied hands by 29 January, and 7th Indian Division prepared to move on Buthidaug.

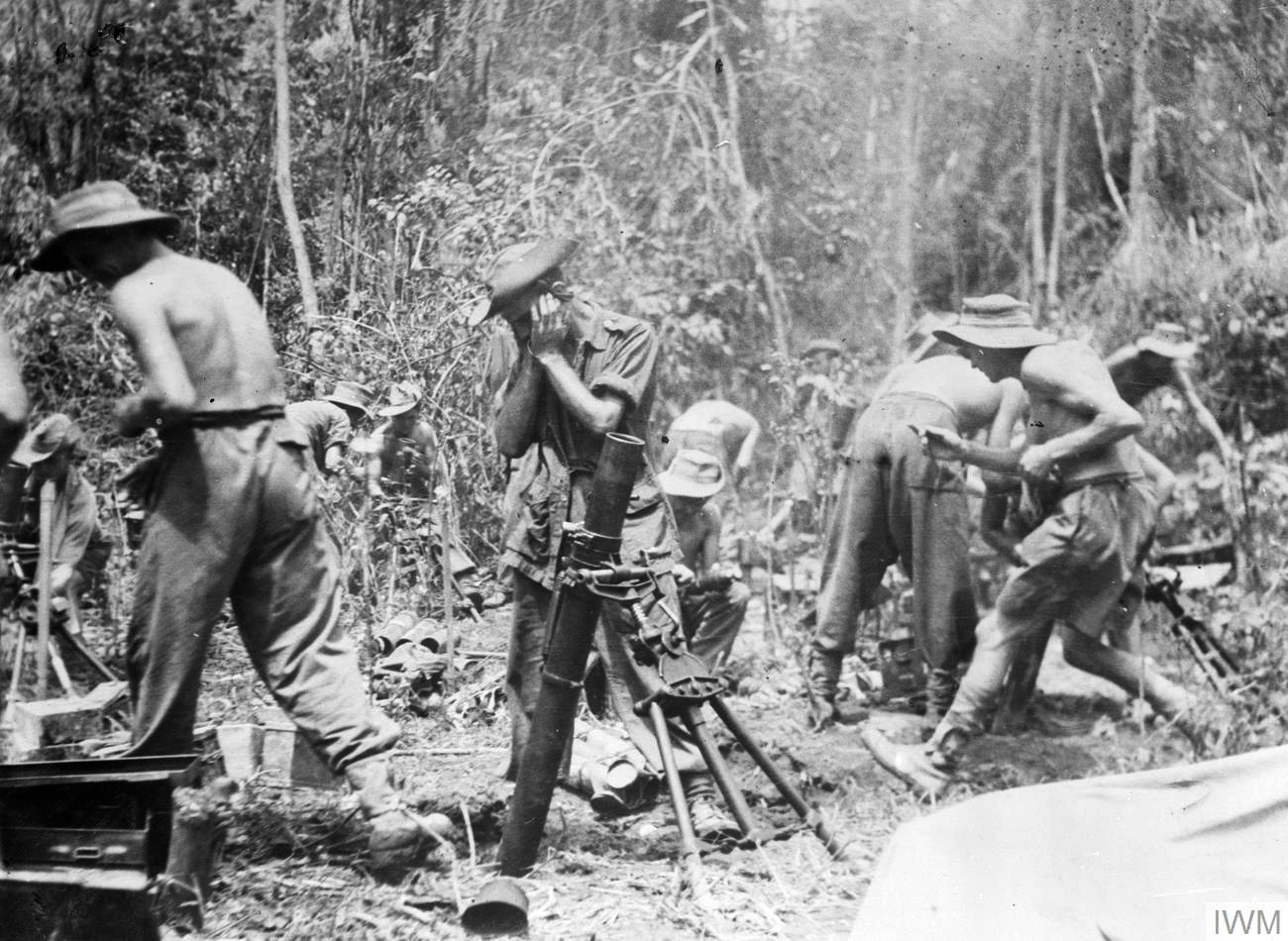
3-inch Mortar in action during the battle of Kohima-Imphal.

However, this advance was forestalled by the Japanese 'HA-GO' counter-offensive. The attackers infiltrated the Allied positions on 4 February and attacked 7th Indian Division's HQ, beginning the Battle of the Admin Box. 139th Jungle Fd Rgt was with 33rd Indian Brigade's HQ at Tatmakhali, which was attacked on 7 February, when one of the regiment's mortar positions was overrun. Okeydoke Pass was captured, but the Admin Box held out, and for several days 139th Jungle Fd Rgt under Lt-Col 'Harry' Hall had to carry out defensive fire and counter-battery tasks both for 33rd Indian Bde's position but also turn round and support the defenders of the Box. 364 Battery's eight 3.7-inch howitzers were with other RA units in a position that became known as 'Gun Valley' when the Japanese made a moonlight attack early on 9 February. While the other units fought off direct attacks, 364 Bty was able to engage the Japanese and allow the gunners to pull back to new positions. 7th Indian Division was resupplied by air and the boxes held out for 16 days until relieved. Operation HA-GO was called off on 24 February, and 7th Indian Division, supported by 139th Fd Rgt and the whole divisional and corps artillery from Gun Valley, took Buthidaug on 9 March.

==== Kohima–Imphal ====
On 6 May 1944, the regiment was airlifted from Sylhet with 33rd Indian Brigade to reinforce the British force encircled at Imphal. The gunners dismantled their mountain howitzers and loaded the parts into Dakotas, and were in action on the Kohima–Imphal road within two hours of landing.

After the Japanese defeat at the twin battles of Imphal and Kohima, the regiment moved back to Ranchi in June for rest before returning to Kohima in October. It was once more equipped with 24 x 25-pounders, now on narrow 'Jury' axles to aid movement on jungle tracks, and the regiment developed a technique for dismantling these guns and stowing them aboard Dakotas. (It dropped the 'Jungle' part of its title on 5 July.)

The final phase of the Burma Campaign began on 20 December 1944. By 15 February, the 7th Indian Division had advanced 515 miles over country where roads had to be built, and had established a bridgehead across the River Irrawaddy after severe fighting. This was followed by the advance to Rangoon, during which 503 Bty used a captured Japanese 155 mm gun.

When VJ-Day arrived, the regiment was still with 7th Indian Division. However, it was not required when the division moved into Thailand in September to take the surrender of Japanese forces. The regiment sailed from Rangoon in November 1945 and landed at Liverpool in January 1946. It was placed in suspended animation at Woolwich on 28 February 1946 and formally disbanded when the TA was reformed on 1 January 1947.

== Postwar ==
After the TA was reconstituted, 91st Fd Rgt was reformed at Lewisham on 1 May 1947 as 291 (4th London) Airborne Field Regiment in 16th Airborne Division. The regiment had two batteries (P and Q) of 25-pounders, which could be air-dropped while the gunners parachuted into action. For two years P Bty operated US 75 mm pack howitzers.

The regiment was adopted by the Metropolitan Borough of Lewisham in 1951, and by the Worshipful Company of Vintners in the City of London in 1954. In June 1955, it was redesignated as 291 (4th London) Parachute Field Regiment. However, 16th Airborne Division was then reduced to a single brigade, and the regiment was given the choice of becoming a single battery in a composite airborne regiment, or reverting to being a field regiment. The CO chose the latter and, on 31 October 1956, the regiment became simply 291 (4th London) Field Regiment, assigned once more to 56th (London) Division, and with an additional R Bty based at Penge.

The TA was reduced in size in 1960 and on 1 May 1961 the regiment was merged with 263 (6th London), 298 (Surrey Yeomanry, Queen Mary's) and 381 (East Surrey) Field Rgts, becoming Q (4th London) Battery (still at Ennersdale Road) in 263 (Surrey Yeomanry, Queen Mary's) Field Regiment. The 4th Londons and Lewisham links ended when the TA was reduced again in 1967.

== Commanding officers ==
The following officers commanded the unit:

- Hon Col Edwin Hughes, VD, 1868–1888 (9th KAVC)
- Hon Col Edward T. Hughes, CB, VD, 1888–1904 (2nd KAVC)
- Hon Col Frank Griffith, VD, 1904–11 (2nd Kent RGA(V))
- Lt-Col Edward T. Lea, TD, 1911–15 (1/IV)
- Lt-Col E.W. Finch, 1914–16 (2/IV)
- Lt-Col A.R. Wainewright, CMG, DSO, 1915–16 (1/IV)
- Lt-Col E. Pottinger, 1916 (1/IV)
- Brevet Col E. Eton, DSO, TD, 1916–18 (2/IV) and 1920–26 (91st)
- Lt-Col A.K. Main, DSO, 1918–19 (2/IV)
- Brevet Col J.V. Gray, MC, TD, 1926–30 (91st)
- Brevet Col G. Mallett, MC, TD, 1930–34 (91st)
- Brevet Col G. Ames, MC, TD, 1934–41 (91st and 139th)
- Lt-Col W. Buffey, DSO, TD, 1939–43 (91st)
- Lt-Col E.O. Faulkner, 1943 (91st)
- Lt-Col R.A. Elliott, MBE, 1943–46 (91st)
- Lt-Col B.G. Wells, 1943–46 (139th)
- Lt-Col R.T. Willson, TD, 1947–52 (291st)
- Lt-Col K.L. Elkington, OBE, MC, TD, 1952–57 (291st)
- Lt-Col P.W. Foster, OBE, MC, TD, 1957–58 (291st)
- Lt-Col R.J.F. Lane, TD, 1958–61 (291st)
- Maj A. Constance, TD, 1961(Q Bty)
- Maj S.W.C. Savage, TD, 1961– (Q Bty)

== Honorary Colonels ==
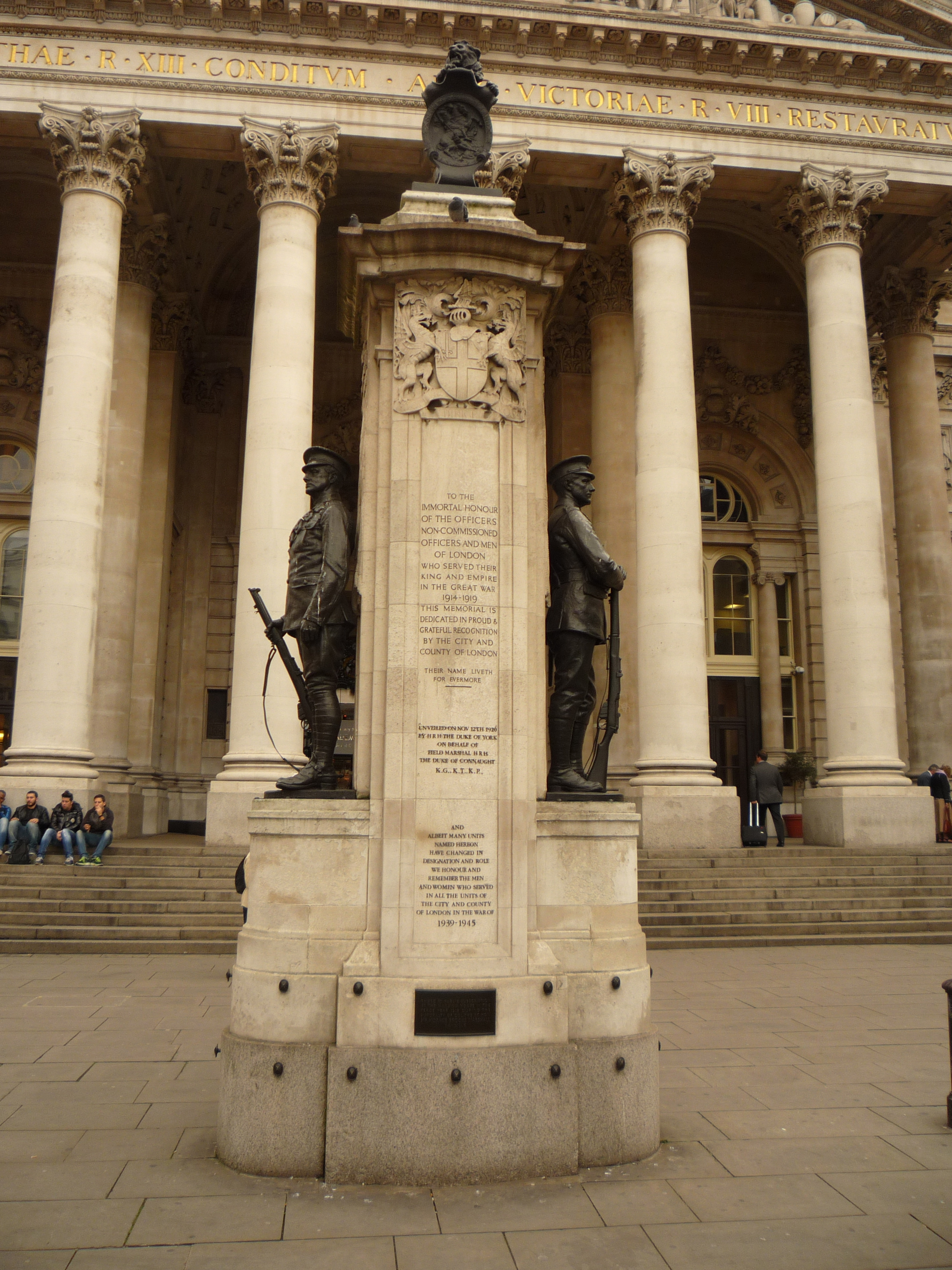
London Troops Memorial in 2013

The following officers served as Honorary Colonel of the unit:

- Col Sir Edwin Hughes, VD, 12 January 1889 until 1904
- Col Sir Thomas Dewey, 1st Bart, 25 March 1905 until 1921
- Col H.N. Clark, DSO, TD, 3 November 1921 until 1934
- Col W.J. Lindsay-Forbes, MC, 18 July 1934 (91st) until 1944
- Col R.O. Hambro, (139th) 1939 until 1947
- Brig W. Buffey, DSO, TD, (291st) 1947 until 1957

== Prominent members ==
- Both Sheriffs of London for the year 1905–06, Sir Henry Smallman and Sir Vansittart Bowater, were members of the 2nd Kent RGA. Bowater went on to become Lord Mayor of London (1913–14).
- Vansittart Bowater's brother Frank Bowater was major commanding 11th (London) Bty from 1908 to 1916, including service in the First World War; he too went on to be Lord Mayor of London (1938–39).
- Frank Bowater's son, Noel Bowater, also served in the unit (commissioned into 10th (London) Bty in 1913) during the First World War, winning an MC, and was Lord Mayor of London 1953–54.

== Uniforms and insignia ==
The uniform of the 2nd KAVC and 2nd Kent RGA was similar to that of the Regular Royal Artillery, but with white metal buttons and badges instead of brass, and silver officers' lace instead of gold. In the Territorial Force the uniform was identical to the Regulars, but the men wore a brass shoulder title with 'T' over 'RFA' over 'LONDON', and the RA badge did not carry the motto 'Ubique' ('Everywhere') because they were intended for home defence only.

== Memorials ==
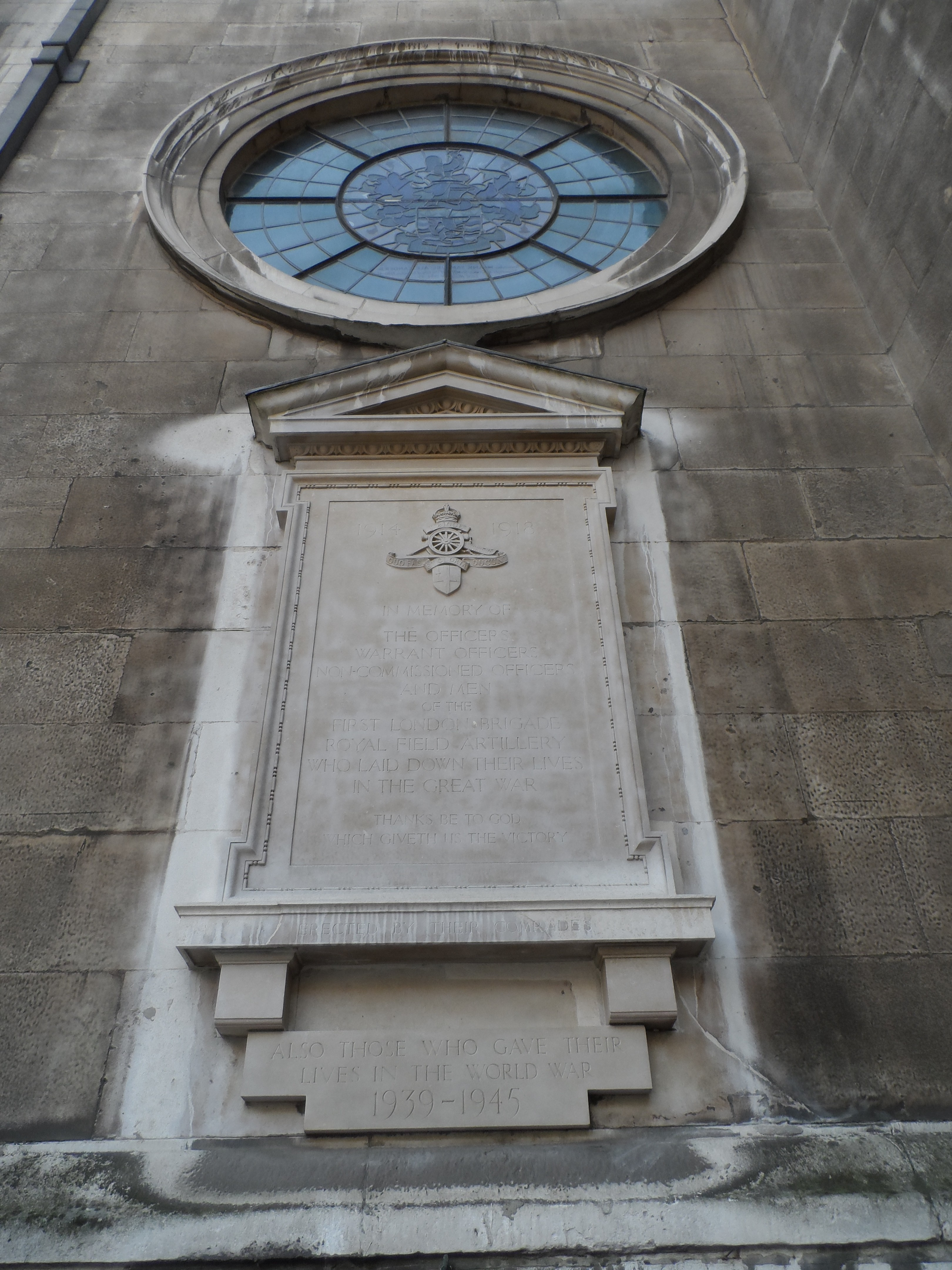
Memorial at St Lawrence Jewry in 2016 after restoration

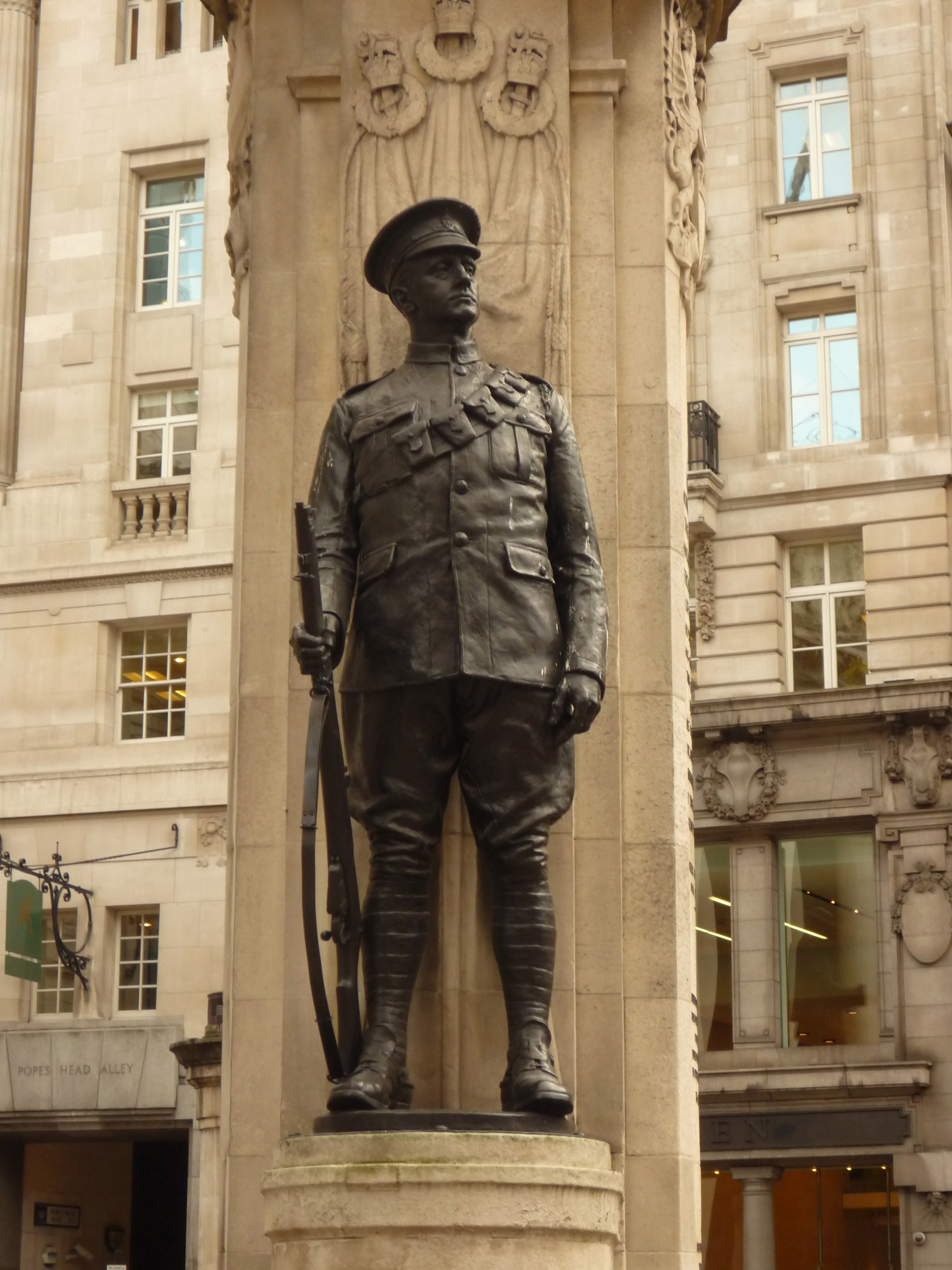
The artillery figure on the London Troops Memorial

The 4th London (County of London) Brigade RFA is listed on the City and County of London Troops Memorial in front of the Royal Exchange, with architectural design by Sir Aston Webb and sculpture by Alfred Drury. The left-hand (northern) figure flanking this memorial depicts a Royal Artilleryman representative of the various London Artillery units.

The First World War memorial plaque of the 1st London (City of London) Brigade RFA is on the exterior wall of St Lawrence Jewry Church facing Guildhall Yard in the City of London. The dedication ceremony on 22 October 1921 specifically referred to the men of 1/11th (Lewisham) Bty, which, with a section of 500th (New Army) Bty, formed D (H) Bty of 280 (1/1st (City of London)) Brigade, and 2/10th Bty, which served in 290 (2/1st (City of London)) Brigade.

== Online sources ==
- British Army units from 1945 on
- British Military History
- The Long, Long Trail
- Orders of Battle at Patriot Files
- Land Forces of Britain, the Empire and Commonwealth – Regiments.org (archive site)
- Royal Artillery 1939–1945
- Graham Watson, The Territorial Army 1947
- UK National Inventory of War Memorials
