= Sir Charles Davis, 1st Baronet =

Sir Arthur Charles Davis, 1st Baronet (1878 – 27 October 1950) was Lord Mayor of London for 1945–46. He was managing director of Associated Portland Cement Manufacturers Ltd.

== See also ==
- Davis baronets
