= Peak House, Sidmouth =

House in Sidmouth, Devon, England

Coordinates: 50.6764°N 3.2517°W

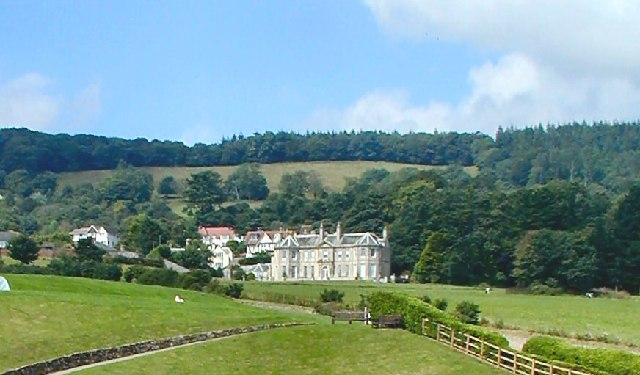
Peak House

Peak House in Sidmouth, Devon, is a building designed by Evelyn Hellicar. It was finished in 1904 and is entirely made of beer stone. It is a Grade II Listed building.

== History ==
In 1793, London financier Emmanuel Baruh Lousada of the Lozada family purchased 125 acres at Peak Hill and established Peak House estate. The house, built about 1796, commanded a fine view of the sea. Many of his wealthy relatives and friends came to visit and later made their own houses in the area. Sidmouth became an important site for the Anglo-Jewish community. Emmanuel Lousada died in 1832 and the estate passed to his nephew, also named Emmanuel. The property remained in the family until 1877 when it was sold to a John Hough of Middlesex.

The original Peak House burned down in 1903. The current building was designed by Evelyn Hellicar for Thomas Charles Dewey, President of the Prudential Assurance Company, and constructed just north of the ruins of the old house. The new house was completed in 1904 and retained many of its Georgian features and furnishings. During World War I, Dewey loaned Peak House to the Red Cross for use as a 100 bed convalescent hospital for wounded soldiers. It is now divided into four flats.
