= Duncan baronets =

Set index for Duncan baronets

There have been three baronetcies created for individuals with the surname Duncan, one in the Baronetage of Great Britain and two in the Baronetage of the United Kingdom. All three creations are now extinct.

- Duncan baronets of Marylebone (1764): see Sir William Duncan, 1st Baronet (c.1715–1774)
- Duncan baronets of Horsforth Hall (1905)
- Duncan baronets of Jordanstone (1957): see Sir James Duncan, 1st Baronet (1899–1974)

== See also ==
- Earl of Camperdown
