= Thomas Charles Dewey =

President of Prudential Assurance Company (1840–1926)

- Born: 31 August 1840; Cheshunt, Hertfordshire
- Died: 13 July 1926 (aged 85); Peak House, Sidmouth
- Known for: President of the Prudential Assurance Company and 1st of the Dewey baronets
- Children: 7

Coat of arms of Thomas Charles Dewey

Crest
A dragon's head erased Sable holding in the mouth a sword in bend Proper pommel and hilt Or between two dragons' wings of the last on each a bend of the first charged with a cinquefoil of the third.
Escutcheon
Quarterly 1st & 4th per fess Sable and Or three cinquefoils within two barrulets between three dragons' heads erased counterchanged in each of their mouths a sword in bend Proper pommel and hilt of the second (Dewey) 2nd & 3rd Savle a griffin segreant Ermine armed Or the wings erminois a bordure compony Argent and Gules (Ballard).
Motto
Vir Sapiens Fortis Est

Sir Thomas Charles Dewey, 1st Baronet (31 August 1840 in Cheshunt, Hertfordshire – 13 July 1926 at Peak House, Sidmouth) was President of the Prudential Assurance Company.

In July 1907 Dewey celebrated his 50th year of service with the Prudential having entered as a junior clerk at the age of 17. He was a member of the War Office Expediture Committee and was made a baronet on 20 February 1917; being the first of the Dewey baronets.

Dewey lived at Bromley, Kent from the 1860s, at Tweed Cottage, High Street and for many years at South Hill Wood, Westmoreland Road (where a commemorative blue plaque was installed in 2013.) He became a leading member of Bromley society, served as a Church Warden of Bromley Parish Church for 30 years and was a patron of many local charities and sporting organisations.

He endowed and was closely associated with St Mark's Church, Westmoreland Road, Bromley; which was designed by Evelyn Hellicar. Dewey's daughter Daisy married the curate-in-charge of the church, Rev L J Lewin, in May 1905. His oldest daughter, Violet, married Reverend Edmund Francis Edward Wigram and their youngest child, Sir Thomas Dewey's grandson, was the Everest mountaineer Edmund Wigram.

His time as Charter Mayor of Bromley in 1903-4 is marked by the inclusion of his initials on a link of the Borough's Mayoral chain. He was made Honorary Freeman of Bromley in July 1904; being called upon to lay the foundation stone to Bromley's Municipal Buildings (Town Hall) in 1907. He was Honorary Colonel of the 2nd Kent Royal Garrison Artillery (Volunteers) (later the 4th London Brigade, Royal Field Artillery) from 1905 until 1921, and largely paid for its drill hall at Ennersdale Road, Lewisham. He became patron of the Kent County Football Association in 1912.

He often entertained at South Hill Wood

He was also patron of Evelyn Hellicar, architect. In 1898 Hellicar extended the house and in 1902 he designed the music pavilion within the grounds; the design of which was exhibited at the Royal Academy of Arts. In 1904 he designed and built Peak House, Sidmouth for Dewey.

During the First World War Dewey made both South Hill Wood and Peak House available as VAD hospitals. In 1922 he was honoured by the King of Belgium with the award of the diploma and insignia of Medaille du Roi Albert for his services to wounded Belgian soldiers.

Baronetage of the United Kingdom
New creation	Baronet (of South Hill Wood); 1917–1926	Succeeded by Stanley Dewey
