= Ellerman baronets =

Title in the Baronetage of the United Kingdom

Escutcheon of the Ellerman baronets of Connaught Square

The Ellerman baronetcy, of Connaught Square in the Metropolitan Borough of Paddington, was a title in the Baronetage of the United Kingdom. It was created on 11 December 1905 for the shipowner and investor John Ellerman. His only son, the 2nd Baronet, was a natural historian and philanthropist. The title became extinct on the latter's death in 1973, leaving no heir.

== Ellerman baronets, of Connaught Square (1905) ==
- Sir John Reeves Ellerman, 1st Baronet (1862–1933)
- Sir John Reeves Ellerman, 2nd Baronet (1909–1973)

== Extended family ==
Annie Winifred Ellerman, better known under the pen name Bryher, only daughter of the 1st Baronet, was a novelist, poet, memoirist, and magazine editor.

Baronetage of the United Kingdom
Preceded by Duncan baronets	Ellerman baronets of Connaught Square; 11 December 1905	Succeeded by Martin baronets
