= Annabel Davis-Goff =

Irish/US author

- Born: 19 February 1942 (age 84); County Waterford, Ireland
- Occupations: Novelist; screenwriter; essayist; academic; advocate
- Spouse: Mike Nichols (m. 1975; div. 1986)
- Children: 2
- Parents: Sir Ernest William Davis-Goff (father); Alice Cynthia Sainthill Woodhouse (mother)
- Family: Rachel Nichols (daughter-in-law)
- Website: annabeldavisgoff.com

Annabel Davis-Goff (born 19 February 1942) is an Irish novelist, academic, screenwriter and advocate, active in the United States.

== Early life ==
Davis-Goff was born to a Protestant family in Ireland to Anglo-Irish parents. Her father was Sir Ernest William Davis-Goff, 3rd Bt; her mother was Alice Cynthia Sainthill Woodhouse. She left Ireland in her teens and worked in England in television and film (she was listed as 'Continuity' in the credits for the films Walkabout and Performance) before moving to the United States. She lived for a while in California and then moved to Connecticut upon her marriage.

== Literary career ==
Davis-Goff is best known for her family memoir Walled Gardens (1990; new edition by Eland in 2008). She has published several lesser-known books since, including The Dower House (1997), This Cold Country (2002) and The Fox’s Walk (2005). She has edited The Literary Companion to Gambling and has reviewed books for The New York Times and Entertainment Weekly. The New Yorker and The Washington Post have labelled her work "exquisite" and "brilliant".

== Advocacy ==
Davis-Goff taught for about two decades at Bennington College in Bennington, Vermont, before retiring. She has worked for more than 30 years with organizations that serve homeless families in New York City and is an advocate for prison reform.

== Personal life ==
Davis-Goff was married to Hollywood film director Mike Nichols for 11 years, from 1975 to 1986, until the marriage ended in divorce. They had 2 children together; Max Nichols (married to Rachel Alexander) and Jenny Nichols. Mike Nichols died of a heart attack in 2014, after which Davis-Goff divided her time between Manhattan and Vermont.

Her niece, Sarah Davis-Goff, is also an author, focusing on Ireland-based post-apocalyptic drama, and is a founder of the publishing company Tramp Press.
