= Sir John Ellerman, 2nd Baronet =

English shipowner, natural historian and philanthropist

Sir John Ellerman Bt
- Born: 21 December 1909
- Died: 17 July 1973 (aged 63)
- Education: Malvern College
- Occupation: Shipowner
- Spouse: Esther de Sola (m. 1933)
- Parent: Sir John Ellerman, 1st Baronet

Sir John Reeves Ellerman, 2nd Baronet (21 December 1909 – 17 July 1973) was an English shipowner, natural historian and philanthropist. The only son and heir of the English shipowner and investor John Ellerman, he was often said to be Britain's richest man. His sister was the writer Bryher.

== Life ==
John Reeves Ellerman was educated at Malvern College, where as a teenager he wrote an anti-sport novel, Why Do They Like It?, under the pseudonym E. L. Black. He read for the bar at the Inner Temple before entering his father's shipping business.

Ellerman was twenty three when his father died in July 1933. His father's estate was assessed for probate at £36.685 million, almost three times the previous record set in the United Kingdom, of which he received around £20 million. He promptly married his Canadian girlfriend, Esther de Sola, daughter of Clarence I. de Sola, of whom his father had disapproved. He oversaw Ellerman Lines for many years, and was often said to be Britain's richest man.

Ellerman's main interest was the study of rodents. He wrote The Families and Genera of Living Rodents. He also undertook various philanthropies and helped Jewish refugees to escape Nazi rule in Germany (his grandfather's homeland), earning the wrath of William Joyce ("Lord Haw-Haw") who attacked him by name in his propaganda broadcasts, incorrectly claiming that he was of Jewish descent.

Shortly before his death he had transferred 79% of the shares in Ellerman Lines Ltd to grant-making trusts: The Moorgate Fund, established 1970, and The New Moorgate Fund, established 1971, were amalgamated as The John Ellerman Foundation in 1992.

He died of a sudden heart attack in 1973. Upon his death, he left £53 million (equivalent to £813,238,448 in 2023), the largest will ever proved in the UK at the time. However, after adjusting for inflation, his estate was worth less than he had inherited.

Ellerman had no children.

== Works ==
- The families and genera of living rodents, 1940 (vol. 1), 1941 (vol. 2)
- Checklist of Palaearctic and Indian mammals, 1758–1946, 1951
- Southern African mammals, 1758–1951: a reclassification, 1953

Baronetage of the United Kingdom
Preceded by John Ellerman	Baronet (of Connaught Square); 1933–1973	Extinct
