= Dewey baronets =

Baronetcy in the Baronetage of the United Kingdom

The Dewey Baronetcy, of South Hill Wood in Bromley, in the County of Kent, is a title in the Baronetage of the United Kingdom. It was created on 20 February 1917 for Thomas Charles Dewey, President of the Prudential Assurance Company. The second Baronet was a clergyman and served as Prebendary of Exeter Cathedral from 1935 to 1943. He was also Sheriff of Devon in 1935.

== Dewey baronets, of South Hill Wood (1917) ==
- Sir Thomas Charles Dewey, 1st Baronet (1840–1926)
- Sir Stanley Daws Dewey, 2nd Baronet (1867–1948)
- Sir Anthony Hugh Grahame Dewey, 3rd Baronet (1921–2016)
- Sir Rupert Grahame Dewey, 4th Baronet (born 1953)

The heir apparent is Thomas Andrew Dewey (born 1982).

Coat of arms of Dewey baronets

Crest
A dragon's head erased Sable holding in the mouth a sword in bend Proper pommel and hilt Or between two dragons' wings of the last on each a bend of the first charged with a cinquefoil of the third.
Escutcheon
Quarterly 1st & 4th per fess Sable and Or three cinquefoils within two barrulets between three dragons' heads erased counterchanged in each of their mouths a sword in bend Proper pommel and hilt of the second (Dewey) 2nd & 3rd Savle a griffin segreant Ermine armed Or the wings erminois a bordure compony Argent and Gules (Ballard).
Motto
Vir Sapiens Fortis Est
