= RML 64-pounder 58 cwt =

Ordnance RML 64 pounder 58 cwt gun (converted)
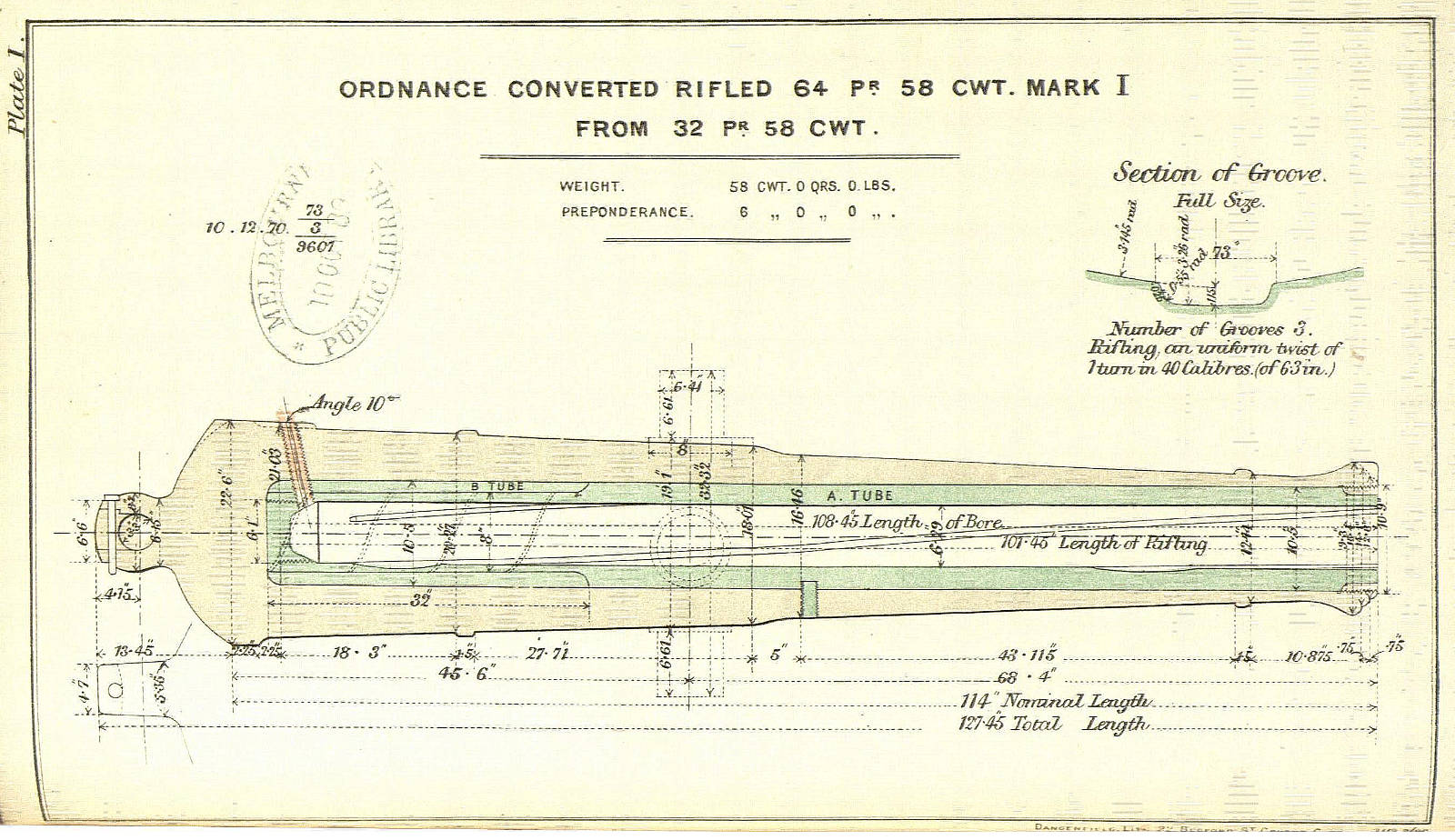
- 64 Pounder (58 cwt) RML gun barrel, diagram from handbook
- Type: Coast defence gun
- Place of origin: United Kingdom

Service history
- In service: 1870–1902
- Used by: British Army; British Colonies

Production history
- Designer: Lt Col William Dundas
- Designed: 1847
- Manufacturer: Royal Gun Factory
- Variants: One mark only

Specifications
- Mass: 6,496 pounds (2,947 kg)
- Barrel length: 103.27 inches (2.623 m) (bore)
- Shell: 64 pounds (29.03 kg)
- Calibre: 6.3-inch (160.0 mm)
- Carriage: Garrison carriage
- Muzzle velocity: 1,230 feet per second (370 m/s)
- Sights: Centre sighted

The RML 64-pounder 58 cwt guns (converted) were British rifled muzzle-loading guns converted from obsolete smoothbore 32-pounder 58 cwt guns. (Note: "58 cwt" refers to the gun's weight rounded up to differentiate it from other "64-pounder" guns : 1 cwt = 112 pounds.)

== Design ==
When Britain adopted rifled ordnance in the 1860s it still had large stocks of serviceable but now obsolete smoothbore guns. Gun barrels were expensive to manufacture, so the best and most recent models were selected for conversion to rifled guns, for use as second-line ordnance, using a technique designed by William Palliser. The Palliser conversion was based on what was accepted as a sound principle that the strongest material in the barrel construction should be innermost, and hence a new tube of stronger wrought iron was inserted in the old cast iron barrel, rather than attempting to reinforce the old barrel from the outside.

This gun was based on the cast-iron barrel of the Dundas Pattern 32-pounder 58 cwt gun, which previously fired a 32-pound solid shot. The gun was bored out to 10.5 inches and a new built-up wrought iron inner tube with inner diameter of 6.29 inches was inserted and fastened in place. The gun was then rifled with 3 grooves, with a uniform twist of 1 turn in 40 calibres (i.e. 1 turn in 252 inches), and proof fired. The proof firing also served to expand the new tube slightly and ensure a tight fit in the old iron tube.

== Ammunition ==
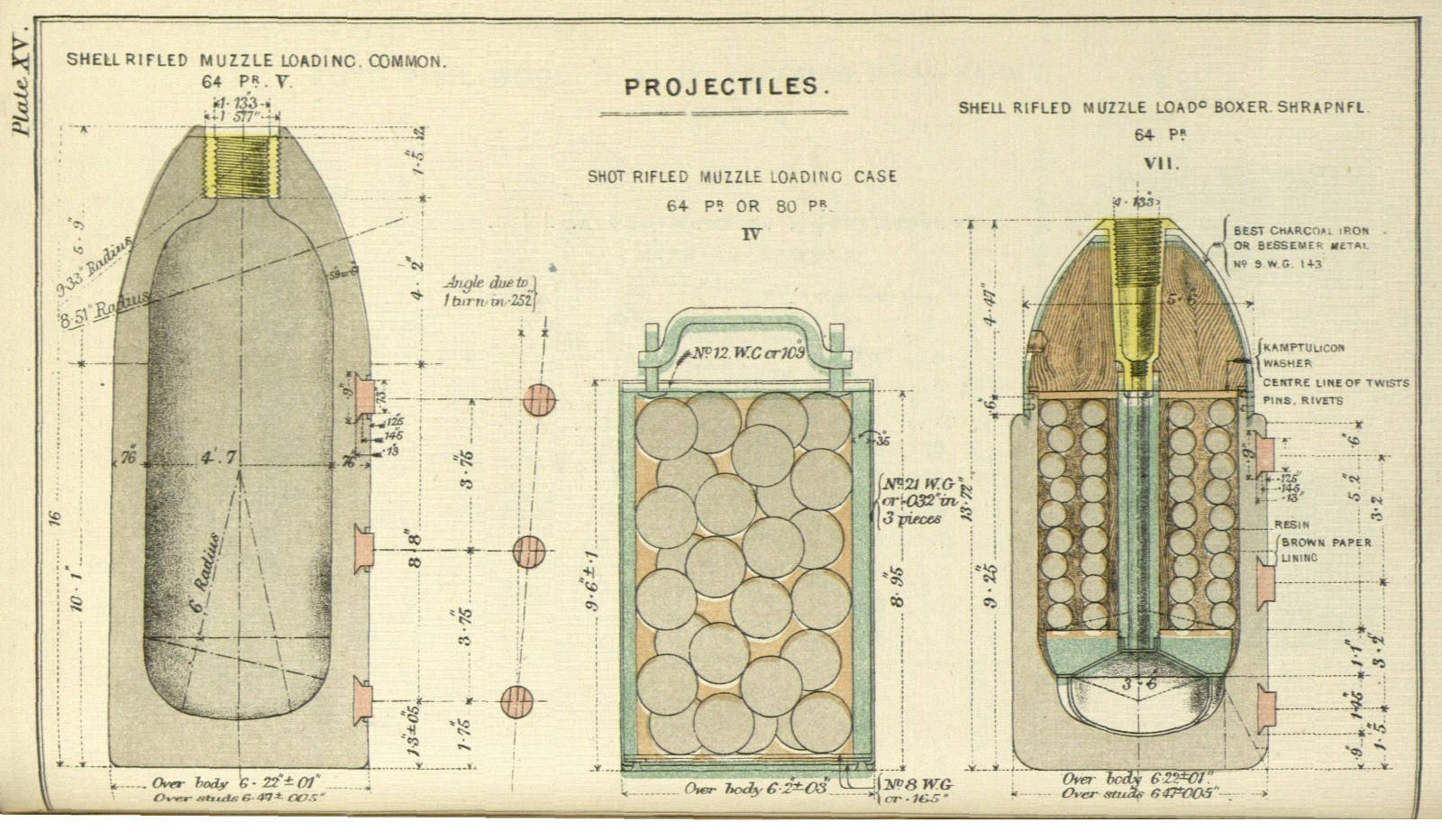
Ammunition diagram from the gun handbook, 1887

The 64-pounder used three types of ammunition. This ammunition was common to the other natures of 64 pounder gun - the 71 cwt converted gun and the 64 cwt gun. Although many guns were sited on coastal artillery positions, their effectiveness again armour of heavily armoured ships was limited. Common shell could be used against buildings or fortifications, shrapnel shell (for use any Infantry or Cavalry) and case shot (for close range use against 'soft' targets. Ignition was through a copper lined vent at the breech end of the gun. A copper friction tube would be inserted and a lanyard attached. When the lanyard was pulled the tube would ignite, firing the gun. A number of different fuzes could be used enabling shells to either burst at a pre-determined time (and range), or on impact.

Guns were fired using a silk bag containing a black powder propellant. A typical rate of fire was one round every three minutes.

== Deployment ==
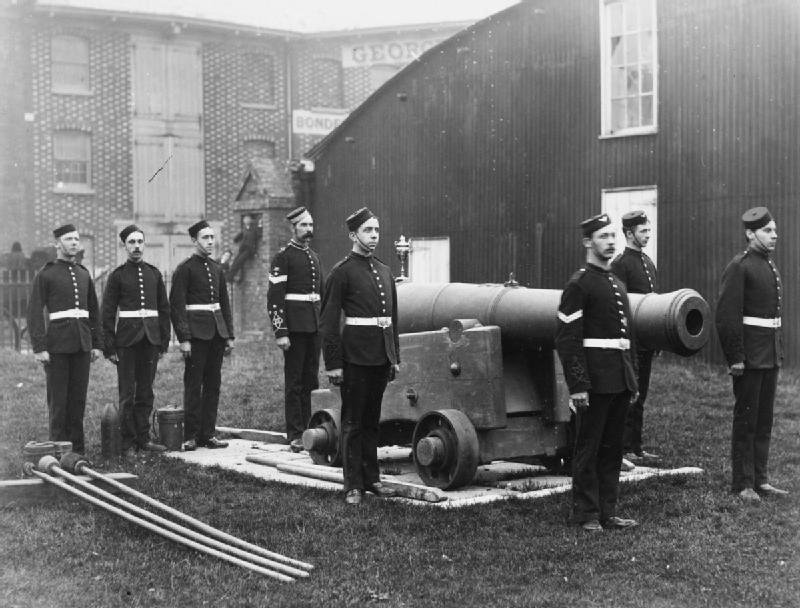
2nd Hampshire Artillery Volunteers with 64 Pounder (58 cwt) gun at drill, Southsea, c1895 (IWM Q41452)

This nature of gun was designed for both land and sea service, though for the latter it was increasingly obsolete not long after introduction. It was used widely all across the British Empire.

It did see Naval Service (NS) with the Naval Forces of the Colony of Victoria in Australia aboard the ex Ship-of-the-Line Nelson. To maintain maximum capability the gunners aboard the Nelson were drilled for both Smooth Bore and Rifled ammunition, and so the guns retained the original Millar Pattern sights as well as having one set of R.M.L. sights placed to the right of the centre line - otherwise the sighting arrangement normally used in British service was a single set of R.M.L. sights on the centre line. The mountings used on this vessel were Wood Naval Standing Carriages.

The gun mountings for coast defence in both British and colonial locations varied enormously. Carriages in both wood and iron varied in complexity – from a simple wooden garrison carriage, right through to some guns mounted on Moncrieff Disappearing gun carriages. Some, such as the depressing type carriages at Gibraltar were unique to their location. Some mountings were designed on mountings which provided some protection for their crews. Many were mounted on wooden garrison carriages on open platforms and were used for gun drill, as well as range practice.

They became obsolete for coast artillery use in 1902, whereupon many were scrapped and disposed of.

== Gallery ==
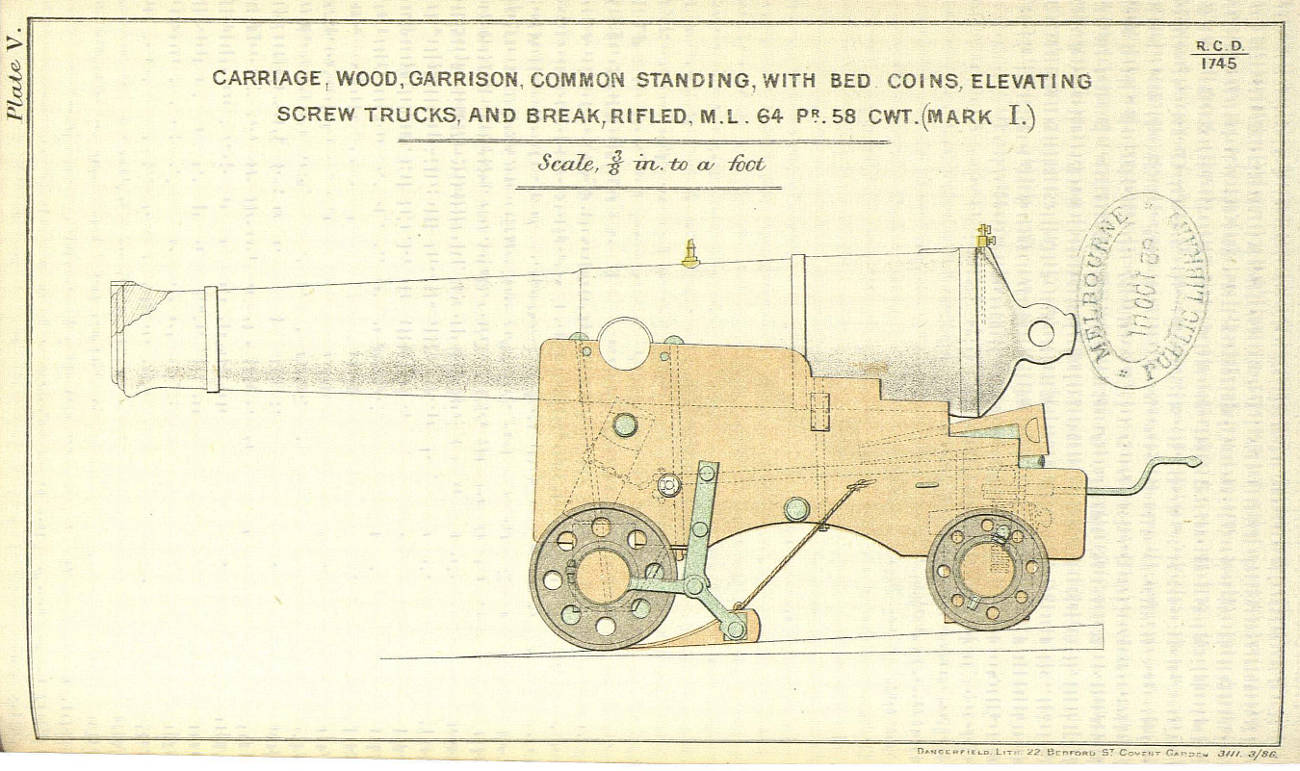
Gun on simple wooden garrison carriage showing sights fitted and Allen Brake to reduce recoil

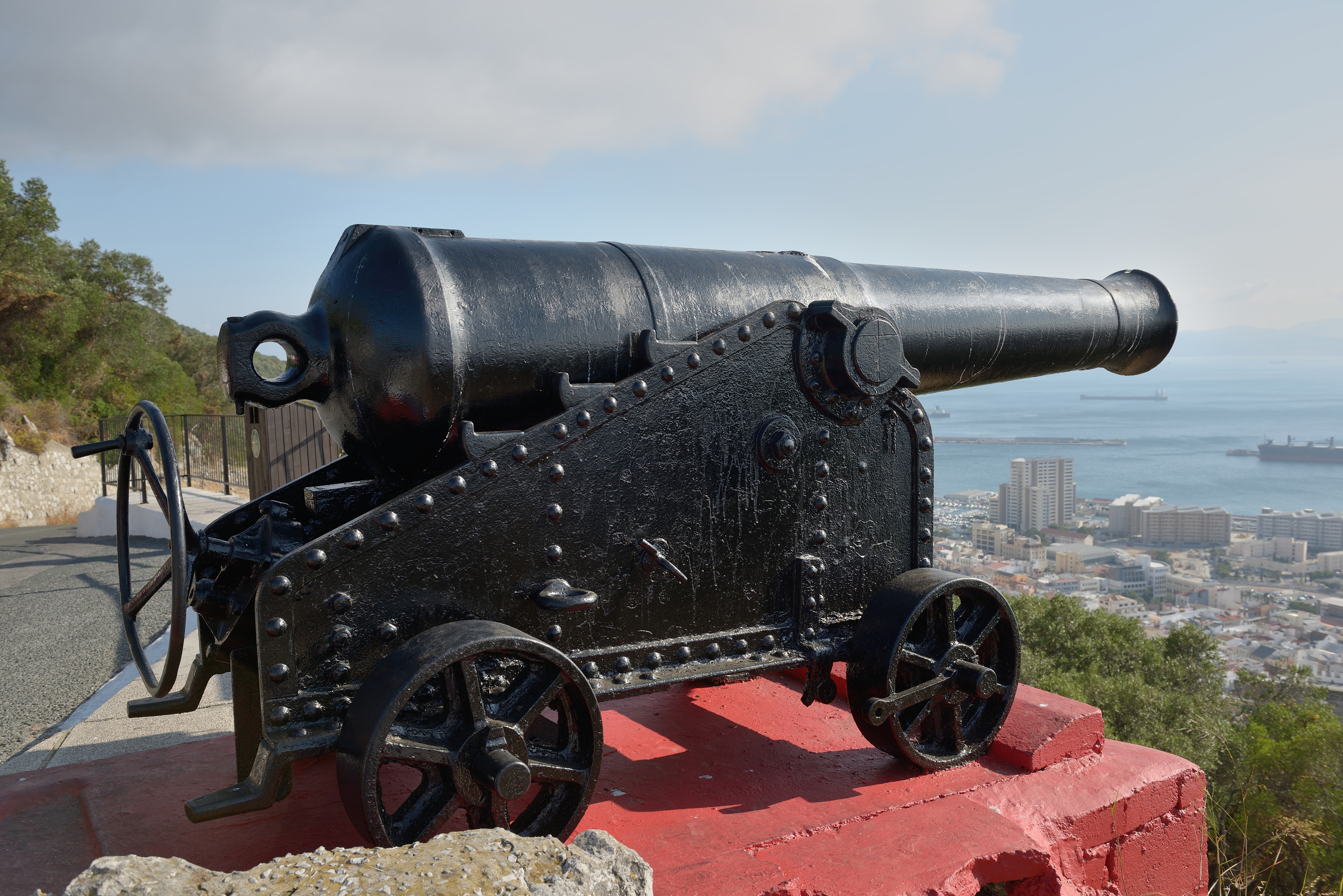
Gun on iron depression carriage, Gibraltar

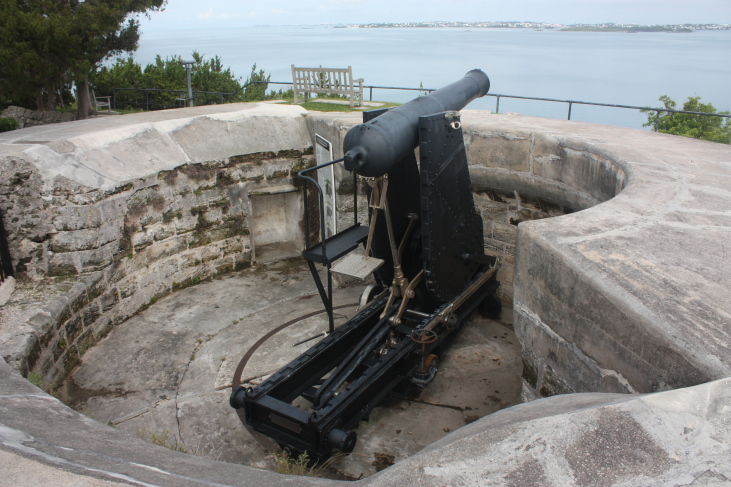
Gun on Moncrieff disappearing mount, at Scaur Hill Fort, Bermuda

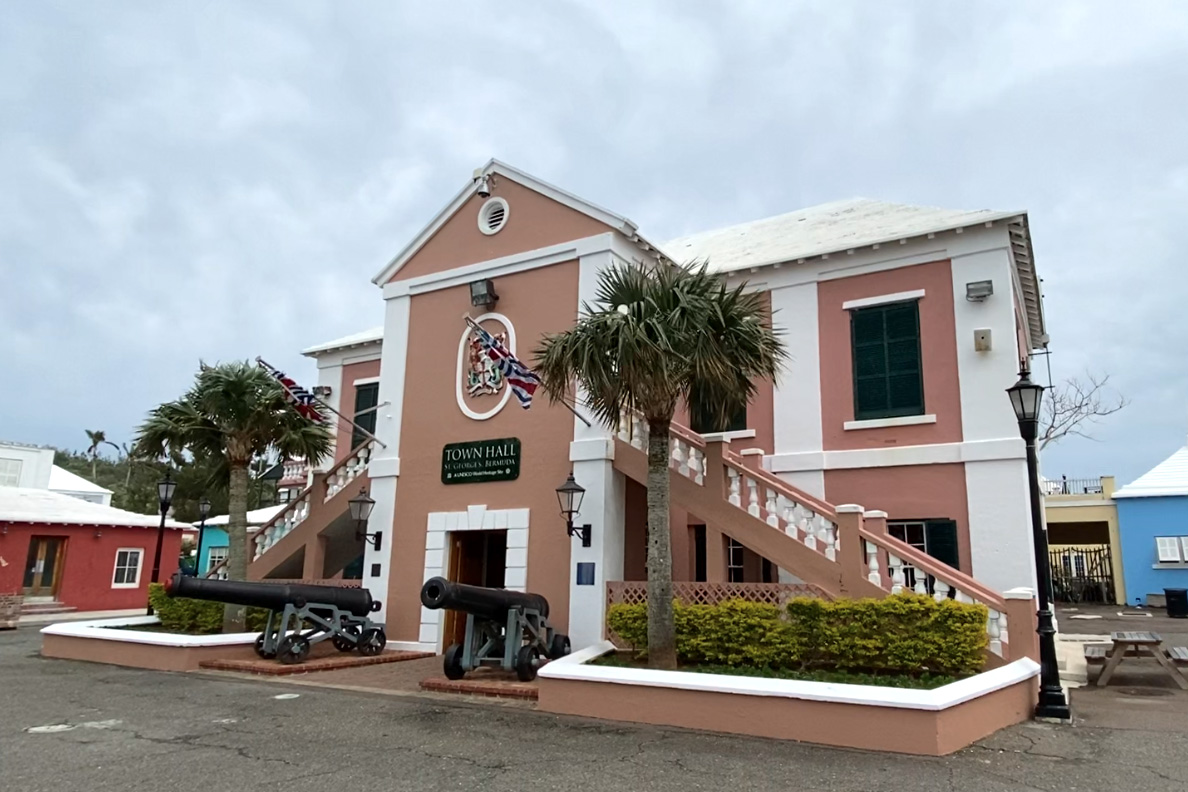
Two guns on metal carriages at the Town Hall of St. George's Town, facing onto the Queen's Square

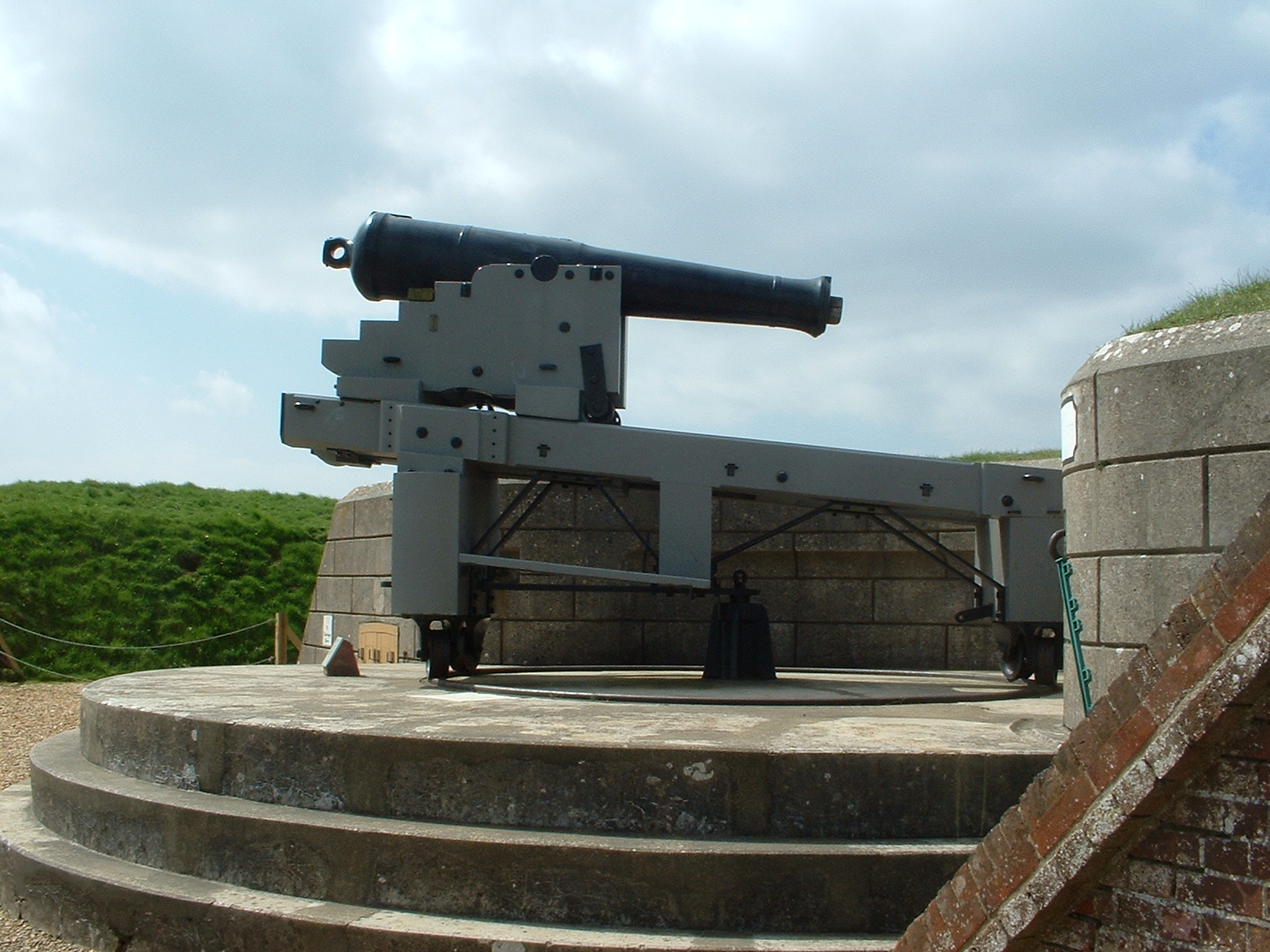
Gun on 'C' pivot traversing platform at Fort Nelson

== See also ==
- RML 64 pounder 64 cwt gun the equivalent new design frontline 64-pounder gun

== Surviving examples ==
- Gun number 70, dated 1871 on wooden traversing carriage, Royal Citadel, Plymouth, Devon, UK
- Gun number 101, dated 1873 at Royal Armouries, Fort Nelson, Hampshire, UK
- Gun number 188, dated 1873 on wooden traversing carriage, Royal Citadel, Plymouth, Devon, UK
- Gun number 220, dated 1873 on wooden traversing carriage, Royal Citadel, Plymouth, Devon, UK
- Gun number 225, dated 1873 on wooden traversing carriage, Royal Citadel, Plymouth, Devon, UK
- Gun number 237 dated 1874, one of a pair located in Digby, Nova Scotia, Canada
- Gun number 255, dated 1873 on wooden traversing carriage, Royal Citadel, Plymouth, Devon, UK
- Gun number 327 dated 1874 – one of a number of examples on iron depression carriages, Gibraltar – from Flickr
- Gun number 401, dated 1874, Prince Edward Battery, Prince Edward Island, Canada
- Gun number 414, dated 1874, Prince Edward Battery, Prince Edward Island, Canada
- Gun number 420, dated 1874, Prince Edward Battery, Prince Edward Island, Canada
- Gun number 448, dated 1874, Prince Edward Battery, Prince Edward Island, Canada
- Gun number 507, dated 1875 on wooden traversing carriage, Royal Citadel, Plymouth, Devon, UK
- Gun number 550, dated 1876 on wooden garrison standing carriage, Royal Citadel, Plymouth, Devon, UK
- Gun number 577, dated 1875 on wooden garrison standing carriage, Royal Citadel, Plymouth, Devon, UK
- Gun number 581, dated 1876 at Royal Armouries, Fort Nelson, Hampshire, UK
- Gun number 611, dated 1876 on wooden traversing carriage, Royal Citadel, Plymouth, Devon, UK
- Gun number 615, dated 1877 at Fort Cumberland, New Brunswick, Canada
- Gun number 619, dated 1875 at Royal Armouries, Fort Nelson, Hampshire, UK
- Gun number 622, dated 1875 on wooden garrison standing carriage, Royal Citadel, Plymouth, Devon, UK
- Gun number 774, dated 1877 preserved at Scaur Hill Fort, Bermuda
- Gun number 798, dated 1877 at King's Square, St George Bermuda
- Several guns from HMVS Nelson can be found scattered around the State of Victoria, Australia in public areas, as well as two on military premises at Victoria Barracks, Melbourne, and one at Fort Queenscliff.

== Bibliography ==
- Treatise on the Construction and Manufacture of Ordnance in the British Service. War Office, UK, 1879
