= Duncan baronets of Horsforth Hall (1905) =

Escutcheon of the Duncan baronets of Horsforth Hall

The Duncan baronetcy, of Horsforth Hall in the Parish of Guiseley, West Riding of the County of York, was created in the Baronetage of the United Kingdom on 9 December 1905 for William Duncan. He had contested Pudsey as a Conservative in the 1885 General Election, but lost to Briggs Priestley. The title became extinct on the death of the 3rd Baronet in 1964, leaving no heir.

== Duncan baronets, of Horsforth Hall (1905) ==
- Sir Surr William Duncan, 1st Baronet (1834–1908)
- Sir Frederick William Duncan, 2nd Baronet (1859–1929)
- Sir Charles Edgar Oliver Duncan, 3rd Baronet (1892–1964)

== Notes ==
Baronetage of the United Kingdom
Preceded by Davis-Goff baronets	Duncan baronets of Horsforth Hall; 9 December 1905	Succeeded by Ellerman baronets
