= The Walled Gardens =

Restaurant in Manchester, England

The Walled Gardens is a very small restaurant in Whalley Range, Manchester, England. It has only eight seats, and is entirely run by chef Eddie Shepherd in his house. It was opened in 2016. He runs a multi-course botanical tasting menu with plants, flowers, seaweeds, wild and foraged ingredients, using techniques including fermentation, distillation and preservation. His foraging trips include the Forest of Bowland, and he avoids reliance on imported exotic ingredients.

In 2024 the restaurant reached 83rd place in the We’re Smart Green Guide list of Best 100 Vegetables restaurants in the world. In 2023 it was rated sixth in the guide’s Top 10 UK vegetarian restaurants.

In 2026 it was the second-highest placed UK restaurant on the list, and 25th in the world.

Shepherd appeared on the BBC Two television series Great British Menu in 2025, representing Lancashire.
