= Davis baronets =

Baronetcy in the Baronetage of the United Kingdom

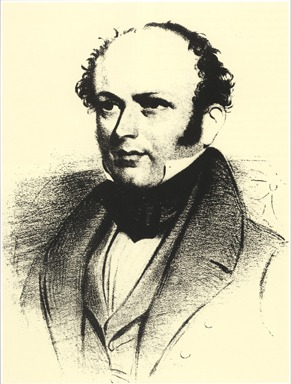
Sir John Davis, 1st Baronet

There have been two baronetcies created for persons with the surname Davis, both in the Baronetage of the United Kingdom. One creation is extinct.

The Davis Baronetcy, of Hollywood in the County of Gloucester, was created in the Baronetage of the United Kingdom on 18 July 1845 for John Francis Davis, Governor of Hong Kong from 1844 to 1848. The title became extinct on the death of the second Baronet in 1896.

The Davis Baronetcy, of Barrington Hall in the County of Cambridge, was created in the Baronetage of the United Kingdom on 30 November 1946 for Charles Davis, Lord Mayor of London from 1945 to 1946.

== Davis baronets, of Hollywood (1845) ==
Escutcheon of the Davis baronets of Hollywood

- Sir John Francis Davis, 1st Baronet (1795–1890)
- Sir Francis Boileau Davis, 2nd Baronet (1871–1896)

== Davis baronets, of Barrington Hall (1946) ==
- Sir (Arthur) Charles Davis, 1st Baronet (1878–1950)
- Sir Gilbert Davis, 2nd Baronet (1901–1973)
- Sir John Gilbert Davis, 3rd Baronet (1936–2019)
- Sir Richard Charles, Davis, 4th Baronet (born 1970)
- Sir Elijah Charles Laine, England, 5th Baronet (born 1998)
