= Sir John Ellerman, 1st Baronet =

English shipowner and investor

Sir John Ellerman Bt
- Born: 15 May 1862; Kingston upon Hull, England
- Died: 16 July 1933 (aged 71); Dieppe, France
- Occupation: Shipowner
- Children: Sir John Ellerman, 2nd Baronet; Bryher

Sir John Reeves Ellerman, 1st Baronet, CH (15 May 1862 – 16 July 1933) was an English shipowner and investor, believed to be the richest man in England. An accountant by training, he learned to identify underpriced companies and acquired them, often as sole stakeholder. His shipping interests were combined into the Ellerman Lines, and he also invested in newspapers, breweries, coal, and London property. Despite his wealth, his personal life was modest and private.

== Early life ==
Ellerman was born in Kingston upon Hull, the only son of a Lutheran ship broker and corn merchant who had emigrated to England from Hamburg, Germany in 1850, and an English mother. His father died when he was nine, leaving an estate of £600 (equivalent to £60,000 in 2025). Ellerman spent part of his childhood in France and briefly attended King Edward VI School in Birmingham. Ellerman did not get on with his mother and lived independently from the age of fourteen, when he was articled to a Birmingham chartered accountant. After completing his articles he moved to London, where he turned down a partnership in one of the leading firms of the day to found his own practice, J. Ellerman & Co, in the City of London in 1886. He was one of the first important British businessmen with a professional qualification in accountancy. He was also one of the first businessmen to use modern accounting methods to identify under-priced companies that should be well suited for takeover.

From 1890, Ellerman began to create major business groups by buying up established businesses, typically ones which had a good product but were in managerial decline after the death of the founder. Most of these businesses flourished under his management. He raised funds from other investors where necessary, but held large stakes personally. The first of these groups was the Brewery and Commercial Investment Trust which appreciated by 1,300% in nine years.

== Shipping ==
In 1892, Ellerman made his first move into shipping by leading a consortium which purchased the Leyland Line from the late Frederick Richards Leyland, one of the largest shipowners in Britain. In 1901 Ellerman sold this business to J. P. Morgan for £1.2 million (equivalent to £127,520,000 in 2025), who immediately folded it into the International Mercantile Marine Co. Ellerman, however, immediately began to buy other shipping lines, and in 1902 he combined his interests into Ellerman Lines. He continued to expand the business, making inroads into the South African, Atlantic and Indian routes while buying rival lines on a regular basis.

In 1916 he paid £4.1 million (equivalent to £308,350,000 in 2025) for Thomas Wilson Sons & Co. of Hull, which had once been the largest privately owned shipping line in the world. The newly acquired company was renamed Ellerman's Wilson Line and it operated as a separate entity from the other Ellerman Lines, maintaining the red funnels with black tops of Thomas Wilson Sons & Co. with most of their vessels having very distinctive dark green hulls.

By 1917, Ellerman owned 1.5 million tons of shipping, equivalent to the entire French merchant navy. Ellerman far surpassed his rivals in shipping; through his shrewd decision-making, assets flourished under his management.

== Other business interests ==
At the same time Ellerman expanded his brewing interests and by 1918 he held shares in more than seventy breweries. In many cases he improved the financial performance of these businesses rapidly. From around 1904 he also invested in newspapers, owning stakes in the Financial Times, the Daily Mail, The Times, the Illustrated London News, Tatler, The Sphere and other publications at various times. He sold most of his press interests in the 1920s.

Another field in which Ellerman was a major player was coal. In the 1920s he held shares in at least 22 collieries. After the First World War he also became a major owner of property in London. Aristocrats such as the Duke of Bedford, Lord Howard de Walden and Earl Cadogan were increasingly selling off slices of the freehold West End estates which had been in their families for centuries and Ellerman was often the buyer.

== Personal life ==
Ellerman had little interest in public recognition. He was created a baronet of Connaught Square in the Metropolitan Borough of Paddington on 11 December 1905 in appreciation of his contribution to British shipping needs during the Boer War, but he could readily have obtained a higher honour if he had wanted one. His lifestyle was not ostentatious. In 1916, he stated that he was worth £55 million (equivalent to £4,136,350,000 in 2025). This may well have been correct, as he had no reputation for self-aggrandisement. The following year, a journalist estimated that his shipping interests alone were worth £35 million. At this time, the Duke of Westminster was generally reckoned to be the second-richest man in the United Kingdom, with a fortune of around £14 million. When Ellerman died in 1933, his estate was assessed for probate in 1936 at £36,684,994 13s. 5d. (equivalent to £2,241,640,000 in 2025). The previous record was £13.5 million left by Lord Iveagh of the Guinness Brewery in 1927. Ellerman had negotiated the Great Depression skillfully, but his wealth at death must have been well below its 1920s peak.

Ellerman lived a secretive life in Mayfair and Eastbourne. Although he did purchase New Slains Castle in Scotland in 1916, he subsequently dismantled it and removed its roof to avoid roof tax, leaving it a ruin by 1925. He made no attempt to join high society or enter politics. One possible reason is that from the early 1890s he lived with a woman called Hannah Glover, and had a daughter by her in 1894, but did not marry her until 1908, the year before the birth of his only son, who was also called John Ellerman.

Ellerman was appointed Member of the Order of the Companions of Honour (CH) in the 1921 New Year Honours. He was buried at Putney Vale Cemetery.

== Descendants ==
Ellerman's daughter Annie Winifred Glover, later Annie Winifred Ellerman, was a published writer under the pen name Bryher. Her autobiography, The Heart to Artemis (1963), gives an account of her father. On his death in July 1933, Ellerman left about £900,000 to Bryher, but the majority of his wealth – around £20 million after death duties – was inherited by his only son John.

== Legacy ==
- His prominent position in commercial shipping earned him the City of Antwerp naming a street for him, the Ellermanstraat near the former Docks Parcel station.

== Footnotes ==
Baronetage of the United Kingdom
New creation	Baronet (of Connaught Square); 1905–1933	Succeeded by John Ellerman
