= Doyle baronets =

There have been two baronetcies created for persons with the surname Doyle in the Baronetage of the United Kingdom, one of questionable legal status. They are both extinct.

- Doyle baronets, of Guernsey, gazetted 1805, created 1825: see Sir John Doyle, 1st Baronet (died 1834)
- Doyle baronets of Buscombe (1828)
