= Davis-Goff baronets =

Baronetcy in the Baronetage of the United Kingdom

Escutcheon of the Davis-Goff baronets of Glenville

The Davis-Goff baronetcy, of Glenville in the Parish of St Patrick's in the County of Waterford, is a title in the Baronetage of the United Kingdom. It was created on 8 December 1905 for William Davis-Goff. He was Sheriff of Waterford in 1869 and 1899 and High Sheriff of County Waterford in 1892. The 2nd Baronet was High Sheriff of County Waterford in 1914.

== Davis-Goff baronets, of Glenville (1905) ==
- Sir William Goff Davis-Goff, 1st Baronet (1838–1918)
- Sir Herbert William Davis-Goff, 2nd Baronet (1870–1923)
- Sir Ernest William Davis-Goff, 3rd Baronet (1904–1980
- Sir Robert William Davis-Goff, 4th Baronet (born 1955)

The heir apparent to the baronetcy is William Nathaniel Davis-Goff (born 1980), eldest son of the 4th Baronet.

Baronetage of the United Kingdom
Preceded by Coats baronets	Davis-Goff baronets of Glenville; 8 December 1905	Succeeded by Duncan baronets
