= List of dormant baronetcies =

This article lists dormant baronetcies in the baronetages of England, Nova Scotia, Ireland, Great Britain and the United Kingdom. According to the Standing Council of the Baronetage, there were 177 dormant baronetcies as of 2026.

A baronetcy is classified as 'vacant' if the most recently recognised baronet has died within the preceding five years and a potential heir may be in the process of filing a formal claim to the title. After five years, if any potential heirs have failed to file a formal claim or have been unable to successfully claim the title, the baronetcy is considered 'dormant' and no longer extant, but can be re-activated should any subsequent claimant file a successful claim.

== List ==
The below table also includes baronetcies which per a study by Stephen Kershaw either have no potential heirs or are potentially extinct, but remain listed as dormant on the Official Roll of the Baronetage.

One potential claimant, but no known heirs after them
Potentially or likely extinct

No.	Baronetcy	Baronetage and creation date	Peerage titles (peerages of and dates held)	Death of last recognised baronet
1	Parkyns of Bunney Park	England 1681		1926
2	Power of Kilfane	United Kingdom 1836		1928
3	Somerville of Dublin	Ireland 1748	Baron Athlumney (Ireland 1863–1929); Baron Meredyth (United Kingdom 1866–1929)	1929
4	Stuart of Hartley Maudit	England 1660		1939
5	Stirling of Glorat	Scotland 1666		1949
6	Deane of Muskerry	Ireland 1710	Baron Muskerry (Ireland 1781)	1954
7	Gordon of Embo	Scotland 1631		1956
8	FitzGerald of Geraldine Place	United Kingdom 1903		1957
9	Murray of Dunerne	Scotland 1630		1958
10	Burnett of Leys	Scotland 1626		1959
11	Home-Purves-Hume-Campbell of Purves Hall	Scotland 1665		1960
12	Grove of Ferne House	United Kingdom 1874		1962
13	Russell of Swallowfield	United Kingdom 1812		1964
14	McCowan of Dalwhat	United Kingdom 1934		1965
15	Hay of Smithfield	Scotland 1635		1966
15	Kellett of Lota	United Kingdom 1801		1966
16	Leslie of Wardis	Scotland 1625		1967
17	Vanneck of Putney	Great Britain 1751	Baron Huntingfield (Great Britain 1796)	1969
18	Brodie of Boxford	United Kingdom 1834		1971
19	Mackenzie of Scatwell	Scotland 1703		1972
20	Leith-Buchanan of Burgh St. Peter	Great Britain 1775		1973
21	Strachey of Sutton Court	United Kingdom 1801		1973
22	St. John of Lideard Tregoze	England 1611	Viscount Bolingbroke (Great Britain 1712); Viscount St. John (Great Britain 1716)	1974
23	Kennedy of Johnstown	United Kingdom 1836		1974
24	Graham of Esk	England 1629		1975
25	Trevelyan of Nettlecombe	England 1662		1976
26	Chaytor of Croft	United Kingdom 1831		1976
27	Wombwell of Wombwell	Great Britain 1778		1977
28	Currie of Wickham Bishops	United Kingdom 1847		1978
29	Jackson of Arlsey	United Kingdom 1815		1980
30	Lucas of Ashtead Park and Lowestoft	United Kingdom 1887		1980
31	Style of Wateringbury	England 1627		1981
32	Freeman of Murtle	United Kingdom 1945		1981
33	Reade of Barton	England 1661		1982
34	Heron-Maxwell of Springkell	Scotland 1683		1982
35	Morris of Clasemont	United Kingdom 1806		1982
36	O'Brien of Merrion Square	United Kingdom 1849		1982
37	Rose of Rayners	United Kingdom 1874		1982
38	Goulding of Millicent	United Kingdom 1904		1982
39	Beecham of Ewanville	United Kingdom 1914		1982
40	Stephenson of Hassop Hall	United Kingdom 1936		1982
41	Rich of Rose Hall	Great Britain 1791		1983
42	Edge of Ribble Lodge	United Kingdom 1937		1984
43	Sebright of Besford	England 1626		1985
44	Duntze of Tiverton	Great Britain 1774		1985
45	ffrench of Clogher	Ireland 1779	Baron ffrench (Ireland 1798)	1986
46	Johnson of Bath	United Kingdom 1818		1986
47	Primrose of Redholme	United Kingdom 1903		1986
48	Broadbent of Longwood and Brook Street	United Kingdom 1893		1987
49	Blackwood of Ballyleidy	Ireland 1763	Baron Dufferin and Claneboye (Ireland 1800); Baron Clandeboye (United Kingdom 1850–1988); Viscount Clandeboye (United Kingdom 1871–1988); Earl of Dufferin (United Kingdom 1871–1988); Earl of Ava (United Kingdom 1888–1988); Marquess of Dufferin and Ava (United Kingdom 1888–1988)	1988
50	Lambert of London	Great Britain 1711		1988
51	Cable-Alexander of Dublin	United Kingdom 1809		1988
52	Robinson of Toronto	United Kingdom 1854		1988
53	Edwards-Moss of Roby Hall	United Kingdom 1868		1988
54	Mackenzie of Coul	Scotland 1673		1990
55	Wolseley of Mount Wolseley	Ireland 1745		1991
56	Henniker of Newton Hall	United Kingdom 1813		1991
57	Rodney of Alresford	Great Britain 1764	Baron Rodney (Great Britain 1782)	1992
58	Seton of Pitmedden	Scotland 1683		1993
59	Mackenzie of Glen Muick	United Kingdom 1890		1993
60	Evans-Tipping of Oaklands Park	United Kingdom 1913		1993
61	Mount of Wasing	United Kingdom 1921		1993
62	Verney of Eaton Square	United Kingdom 1946		1993
63	Gibson of Linconia and Faccombe	United Kingdom 1931		1994
64	Joseph of Portsoken	United Kingdom 1943		1994
65	Vyvyan of Trelowarren	England 1645		1995
66	Campbell of Glenorchy	Scotland 1625	Earl of Breadalbane and Holland (Scotland 1681); Baron Breadalbane (United Kingdom 1806–1862; 1873–1922); Earl of Ormelie (United Kingdom 1831–1862; 1885–1922); Marquess of Breadalbane (United Kingdom 1831–1862; 1885–1922)	1995
67	Brisco of Crofton Place	Great Britain 1782		1995
68	Hodge of Chipstead	United Kingdom 1921		1995
69	Mitchell Cotts of Coldharbour Wood	United Kingdom 1921		1995
70	Piers of Tristernagh	Ireland 1661		1996
71	Wells of Felmersham	United Kingdom 1944		1996
72	Falkiner of Anne Mount	Ireland 1778		1997
73	Nixon of Roebuck Grove	United Kingdom 1906		1997
74	Henry of Cahore	United Kingdom 1923		1997
75	Croft of Knole	United Kingdom 1924	Baron Croft (United Kingdom 1940)	1997
76	Bartlett of Hardington-Mandeville	United Kingdom 1913		1998
77	Balfour of Sheffield	United Kingdom 1929	Baron Riverdale (United Kingdom 1938)	1998
78	Thorold of Marston	England 1642		1999
79	Macartney of Lish	Ireland 1799		1999
80	Simeon of Grazeley	United Kingdom 1815		1999
81	Lindsay-Hogg of Rotherfield Hall	United Kingdom 1905		1999
82	Ainsworth of Ardnanaiseig	United Kingdom 1917		1999
83	Curzon of Kedleston	England 1641	Baron Scarsdale (Great Britain 1761); Baron Curzon of Kedleston (Ireland 1898–1925); Baron Ravensdale (United Kingdom 1911–1925); Viscount Scarsdale (United Kingdom 1911); Earl Curzon of Kedleston (United Kingdom 1911–1925); Earl of Kedleston (United Kingdom 1921–1925); Marquess Curzon of Kedleston (United Kingdom 1921–1925)	2000
84	Fagge of Wiston	England 1660		2000
85	Curzon of Kedleston	Scotland 1636	Baron Scarsdale (Great Britain 1761); Baron Curzon of Kedleston (Ireland 1898–1925); Baron Ravensdale (United Kingdom 1911–1925); Viscount Scarsdale (United Kingdom 1911); Earl Curzon of Kedleston (United Kingdom 1911–1925); Earl of Kedleston (United Kingdom 1921–1925); Marquess Curzon of Kedleston (United Kingdom 1921–1925)	2000
86	Rugge-Price of Spring Grove	United Kingdom 1804		2000
87	Smith of Eardiston	United Kingdom 1809		2000
88	Bagot of Blithfield	England 1627	Baron Bagot (Great Britain 1780)	2001
89	Campbell of Lundy	Scotland 1627	Duke of Argyll (Scotland 1701; United Kingdom 1892); Duke of Greenwich (Great Britain 1719–1743); Marquess of Lorne (Scotland 1701); Earl of Greenwich (England 1705–1743); Earl Campbell and Cowall (Scotland 1701); Earl of Ilay (Scotland 1706–1761); Viscount Lochow and Glenyla (Scotland 1701); Lord Inveraray, Mull, Mover and Tiry (Scotland 1701); Baron Sundridge (Great Britain 1766); Baron Hamilton of Hameldon (Great Britain 1776)	2001
90	Truscott of Oakleigh	United Kingdom 1909		2001
91	Debenham of Bladen	United Kingdom 1931		2001
92	Moncreiffe of Moncreiffe	Scotland 1626	Baron Moncreiff (United Kingdom 1874)	2002
93	King-Tenison of Boyle Abbey	Ireland 1682	Earl of Kingston (Ireland 1768); Viscount Kingston of Kingsborough (Ireland 1766); Viscount Lorton (Ireland 1806); Baron Erris (Ireland 1801); Baron Kingston (Ireland 1764; United Kingdom 1821–1869); Baron Kingsborough (Ireland 1748–1755)	2002
94	Moncreiffe of Kilduff	United Kingdom 1871	Baron Moncreiff (United Kingdom 1874)	2002
95	Pollen of Redenham	Great Britain 1795		2003
96	Macgregor of Savile Row	United Kingdom 1828		2003
97	Barrington of Limerick	United Kingdom 1831		2003
98	Blount of Sodington	England 1642		2004
99	Liddell of Ravensworth Castle	England 1642	Baron Ravensworth (Great Britain 1747–1784; United Kingdom 1821); Baron Eslington (United Kingdom 1874–1904); Earl of Ravensworth (United Kingdom 1874–1904)	2004
100	Chetwynd of Brocton Hall	Great Britain 1795		2004
101	Poore of Rushall	Great Britain 1795		2004
102	Meyrick of Bush House and Apley Castle	United Kingdom 1880		2004
103	Meyer of Shortgrove	United Kingdom 1910		2004
104	Annesley of Mount Norris	Ireland 1620	Viscount Valentia (Ireland 1642); Baron Mountnorris (Ireland 1628); Earl of Anglesey (England 1661–1761); Baron Altham (Ireland 1737–1844); Earl of Mountnorris (Ireland 1793–1844); Baron Annesley of Bletchington (United Kingdom 1917–1949)	2005
105	Taylour of Kells	Ireland 1704	Marquess of Headfort (Ireland 1800); Baron Headfort (Ireland 1760); Viscount Headfort (Ireland 1762); Earl of Bective (Ireland 1766); Baron Kenlis (United Kingdom 1831)	2005
106	Philipson-Stow of Cape Town and Blackdown House	United Kingdom 1907		2005
107	Keyes of Zeebrugge and Dover	United Kingdom 1919	Baron Keyes (United Kingdom 1943)	2005
108	Hood of Wimbledon	United Kingdom 1922		2005
109	Tottenham of Tottenham Green	Ireland 1780	Marquess of Ely (Ireland 1800); Earl of Ely (Ireland 1794); Viscount Loftus (Ireland 1789); Baron Loftus (Ireland 1785; United Kingdom 1801)	2006
110	Warren of Warren's Court	Ireland 1784		2006
111	Nugent of Waddesdon	United Kingdom 1806		2006
112	de Yarburgh-Bateson of Belvoir Park	United Kingdom 1818	Baron Deramore (United Kingdom 1885)	2006
113	Chinubhai of Shahpur	United Kingdom 1913		2006
114	May of the Eyot	United Kingdom 1931	Baron May (United Kingdom 1935)	2006
115	Heathcote of Hursley	Great Britain 1733		2007
116	Blunden of Castle Blunden	Ireland 1766		2007
117	Barrett-Lennard of Belhus	United Kingdom 1801		2007
118	Brunton of Stratford Place	United Kingdom 1908		2007
119	Prichard-Jones of Bron Menai	United Kingdom 1910		2007
120	Nicolson of that Ilk and of Lasswade	Scotland 1629	Baron Carnock (United Kingdom 1916)	2008
121	Nicolson of Carnock	Scotland 1636	Baron Carnock (United Kingdom 1916)	2008
122	Grierson of Lag	Scotland 1685		2008
123	Blake of Menlough	Ireland 1622		2008
124	Carden of Templemore	Ireland 1787		2008
125	Tupper of Armdale	United Kingdom 1888		2008
126	Fison of Greenholme	United Kingdom 1905		2008
127	Bowater of Hill Crest	United Kingdom 1914		2008
128	Leeds of Croxton Park	United Kingdom 1812		2009
129	Blyth of Blythwood	United Kingdom 1895	Baron Blyth (United Kingdom 1907)	2009
130	Archdale of Riversdale	United Kingdom 1928		2009
131	Lyon-Dalberg-Acton of Aldenham	England 1644	Baron Acton (United Kingdom 1869)	2010
132	Arthur of Upper Canada	United Kingdom 1841		2010
133	Miles of Leigh Court	United Kingdom 1859		2010
134	Harvey of Crown Point	United Kingdom 1868	Baron Harvey of Tasburgh (United Kingdom 1954)	2010
135	Beaumont of Stoughton Grange	England 1661		2011
136	Synge of Kiltrough	United Kingdom 1801		2011
137	Cary of Withington	United Kingdom 1955		2011
138	Abdy of Albyns	United Kingdom 1849		2012
139	Cayzer of Gartmore	United Kingdom 1904		2012
140	Roberts of Milner Field	United Kingdom 1909		2012
141	Marsden of Grimsby	United Kingdom 1924		2012
142	Denman of Staffield	United Kingdom 1945	Baron Denman (United Kingdom 1834)	2012
143	Wakeley of Liss	United Kingdom 1952		2012
144	Buckworth-Herne-Soame of Sheen	England 1697		2013
145	Browne of The Neale	Scotland 1626	Baron Kilmaine (Ireland 1789)	2013
146	O'Loghlen of Drumcanora	United Kingdom 1838		2014
147	Chitty of the Temple	United Kingdom 1924		2014
148	Cockburn of that Ilk	Scotland 1671		2015
149	Beresford of Coleraine	Ireland 1665	Marquess of Waterford (Ireland 1789); Earl of Tyrone (Ireland 1745); Viscount Tyrone (Ireland 1720); Baron La Poer (Ireland 1769); Baron Tyrone (Great Britain 1786)	2015
150	Parnell of Rathleague	Ireland 1766	Baron Congleton (United Kingdom 1841)	2015
151	Lawrence of Ealing Park	United Kingdom 1867		2015
152	Coats of Auchendrane	United Kingdom 1905		2015
153	Campbell-Orde of Morpeth	Great Britain 1790		2016
154	Leslie of Glaslough	United Kingdom 1876		2016
155	Ropner of Thorp Perrow	United Kingdom 1952		2016
156	Pigott of Knapton	United Kingdom 1808		2017
157	Touche of Dorking	United Kingdom 1962		2017
158	Swinnerton-Dyer of Tottenham	England 1678		2018
159	Inglis of Glencorse	Scotland 1703		2018
160	Shiffner of Coombe Place	United Kingdom 1818		2018
161	Lowther of Swillington	United Kingdom 1824		2018
162	Boyd of Howth House	United Kingdom 1916		2018
163	Southwell of Castle Mattress	Ireland 1662	Viscount Southwell (Ireland 1776); Baron Southwell (Ireland 1717)	2019
164	Tyrell-Kenyon of Gredington	Great Britain 1784	Baron Kenyon (Great Britain 1788)	2019
165	Tapps-Gervis-Meyrick of Hinton Admiral	Great Britain 1791		2019
166	Seely of Sherwood Lodge and Brook House	United Kingdom 1896	Baron Sherwood (United Kingdom 1941–1970)	2019
167	Burbidge of Littleton Park	United Kingdom 1916		2019
168	Bull of Hammersmith	United Kingdom 1922		2019
169	Fraser of Tain	United Kingdom 1943		2019
170	Davis of Barrington Hall	United Kingdom 1946		2019
171	Thynn of Caus Castle	England 1641	Marquess of Bath (Great Britain 1789); Viscount Weymouth (England 1682); Baron Thynne (England 1680)	2020
172	Gunning of Eltham	Great Britain 1778		2020
173	Brinckman of Burton	United Kingdom 1831		2020
174	Cameron-Ramsay-Fairfax-Lucy of The Holmes	United Kingdom 1836		2020
175	Runciman of Doxford	United Kingdom 1906	Viscount Runciman of Doxford (United Kingdom 1937); Baron Runciman (United Kingdom 1933)	2020
176	Rea of Eskdale	United Kingdom 1935	Baron Rea (United Kingdom 1937)	2020
177	Perring of Frensham Manor	United Kingdom 1963		2020
