= Maitland baronets of Clifton (1818) =

The Maitland, later Gibson-Maitland, later Ramsay-Gibson-Maitland, later Maitland baronetcy, of Clifton in the County of Midlothian, was created in the Baronetage of the United Kingdom on 30 November 1818 for General the Hon. Alexander Maitland. He was the fifth son of Charles Maitland, 6th Earl of Lauderdale. The 2nd Baronet assumed the additional surname of Gibson. The 3rd Baronet sat as Member of Parliament for Midlothian. He assumed the additional surname of Ramsay. The 5th Baronet and his successors have used the surname of Maitland only.

== Maitland, later Gibson-Maitland, later Ramsay-Gibson-Maitland, later Maitland baronets, of Clifton (1818) ==
- Sir Alexander Maitland, 1st Baronet (1728–1820)
- Sir Alexander Charles Gibson-Maitland, 2nd Baronet (1755–1848)
- Sir Alexander Charles Ramsay-Gibson-Maitland, 3rd Baronet (1820–1876)
- Sir James Ramsay-Gibson-Maitland, 4th Baronet (1848–1897)
- Sir John Nisbet Maitland, 5th Baronet (1850–1936)
- Sir John Maitland, 6th Baronet (1879–1949)
- Sir George Ramsay Maitland, 7th Baronet (1882–1960)
- Sir Alexander Keith Maitland, 8th Baronet (1920–1963)
- Sir Richard John Maitland, 9th Baronet (1952–1994)
- Sir Charles Alexander Maitland, 10th Baronet (born 1986)
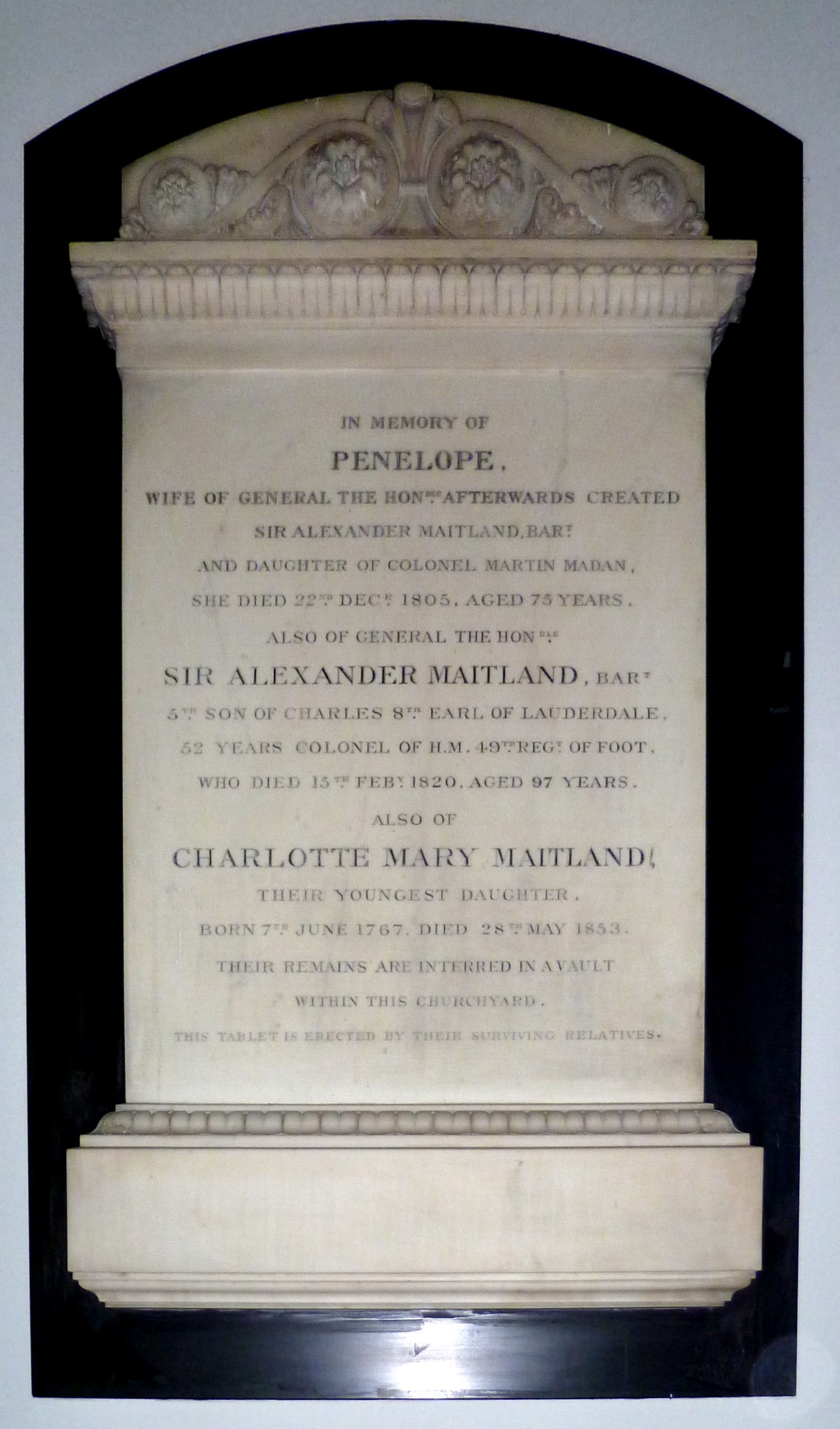
Memorial plaque to Sir Alexander Maitland, 1st Baronet (St Andrew's church, Totteridge)

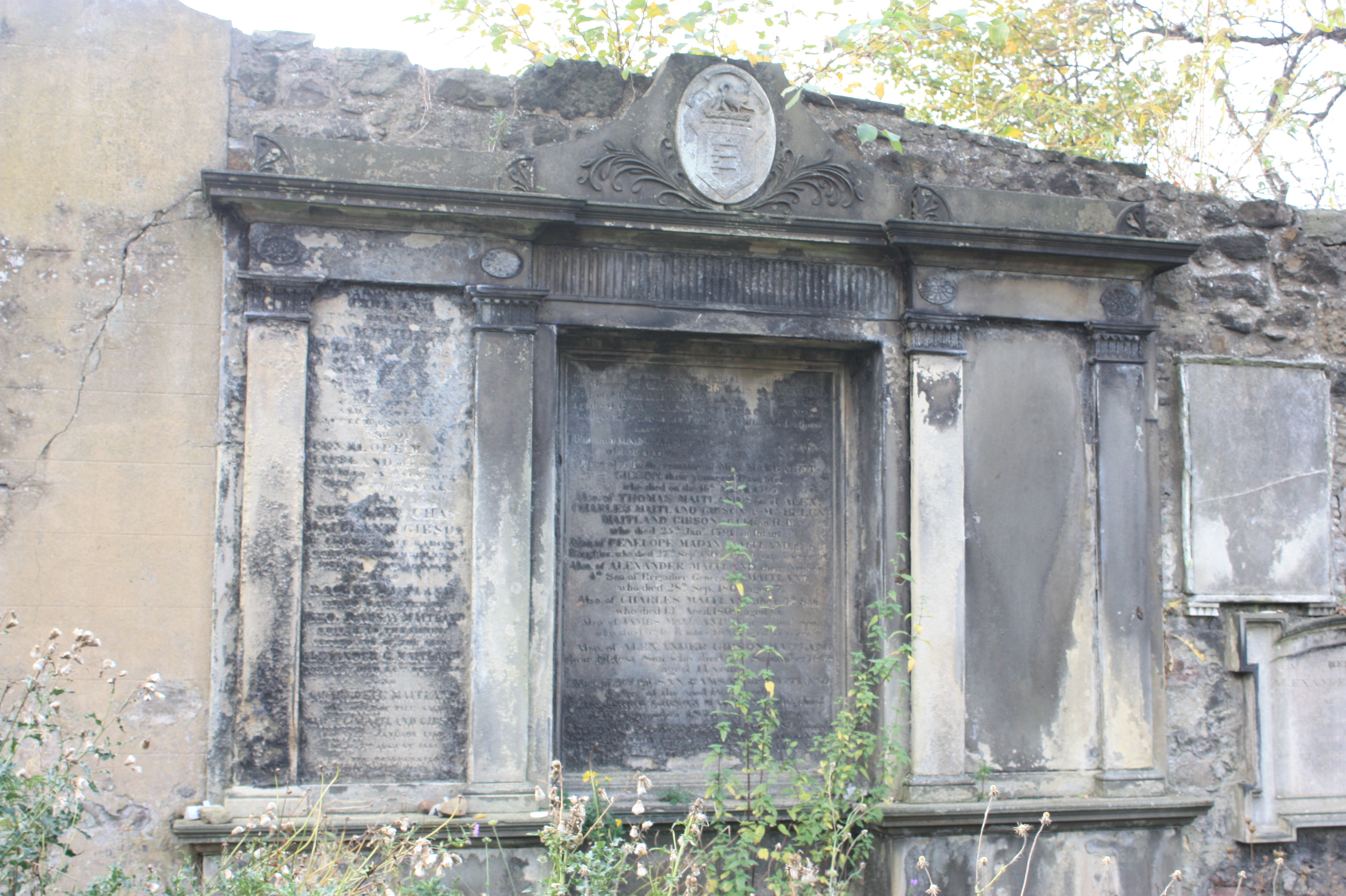
The tomb of the Gibson-Maitland baronets (Greyfriars Kirkyard, Edinburgh)

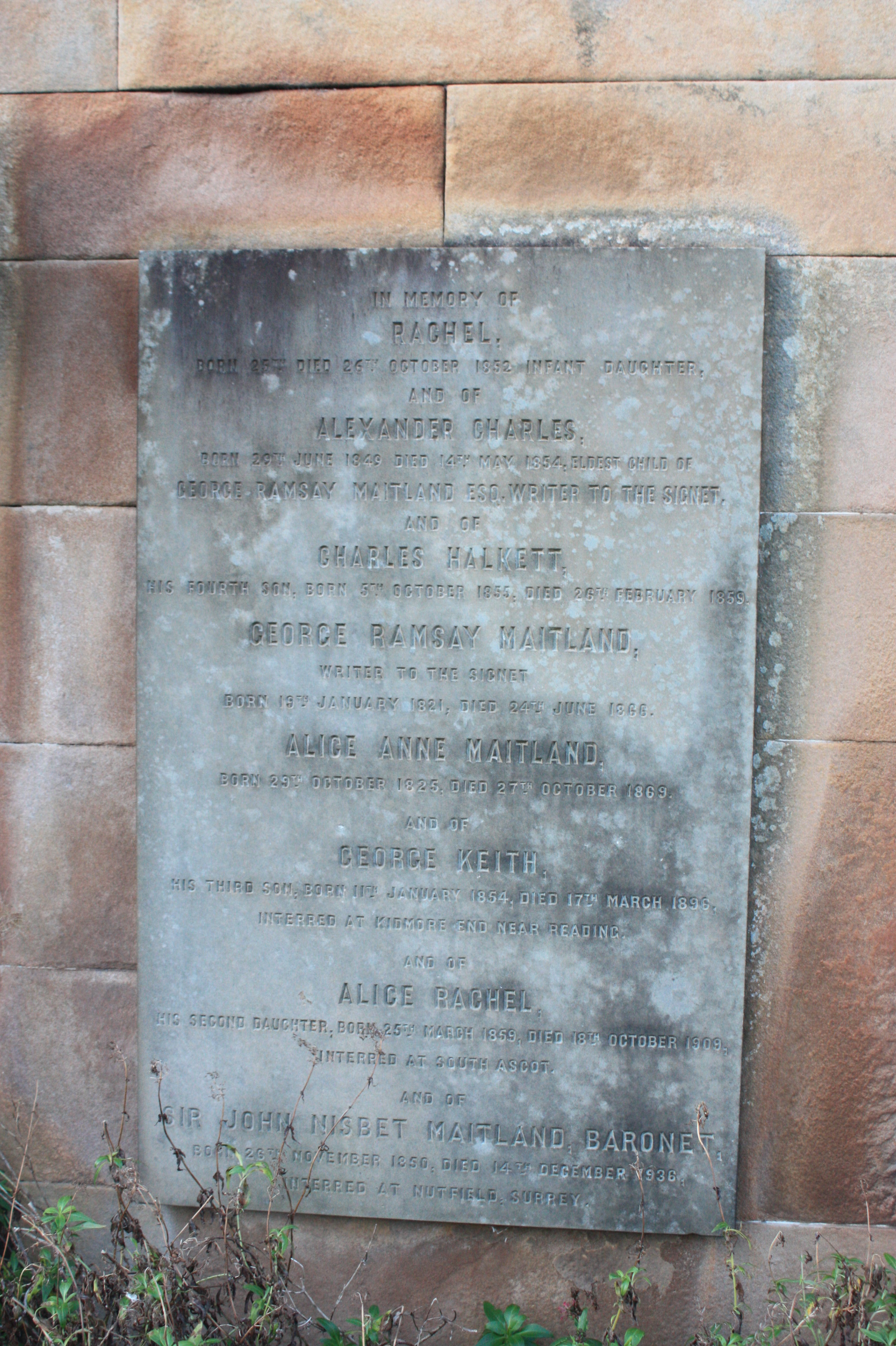
The grave of Sir John Nisbet Maitland, 5th Baronet (Grange Cemetery, Edinburgh)

== Extended family ==
Frederick Maitland, fourth son of the 1st Baronet, was a General in the British Army.

== Notes ==
Baronetage of the United Kingdom
Preceded by Davy baronets	Maitland baronets of Clifton; 30 November 1818	Succeeded by Johnson baronets
