= Ropner baronets =

Set index for Ropner baronets

There have been two baronetcies created for members of the Ropner family, both in the Baronetage of the United Kingdom. Both creations are still extant. The Ropner family is of German descent.

- Ropner baronets of Preston Hall and Skutterskelfe Hall (1904)
- Ropner baronets of Thorp Perrow (1952)
