= Loch Coulter =

Coordinates: 56°03′5.6″N 3°59′13.3″W

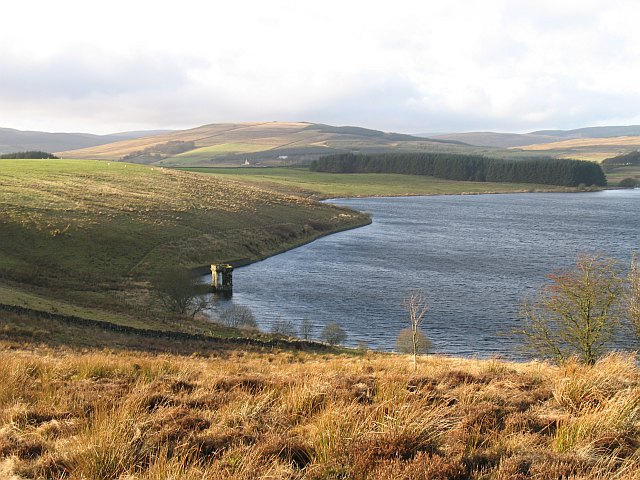
South shore, Loch Coulter Reservoir Westward view with Dundaff Hill in the background

Loch Coulter is a loch and reservoir in Stirlingshire. It lies to the north-west of Denny and north-east of the Carron Valley.

The Loch flow towards Stirling along the Loch Coulter Burn and provides drinking water for the area. It is feed from the Auchenbowie burn from the River Carron. The loch is also used for angling and is leased to LASAC, the Larbert and Stenhousemuir Angling Club. The waters of the loch also supply the nearby Howietoun Fishery established by James Ramsay-Gibson-Maitland in the 19th century.

== History ==
Historically in St Ninians parish, the loch was affected by an earthquake in 1755 that disturbed the morphology of the loch.

The loch occurs naturally but was raised and extended in the 19th century. At this time, an island at the western end of the loch was submerged revealing the potential remains of a crannog.

In 2011, the loch was affected by toxic algae.

In 2025, a rare moss, Ptychostomum cyclophyllum (Round-leaved bryum), was transported to the loch to revive the species. The moss was found only in one other place in the UK until established at Loch Coulter and Threipmuir Reservoir.
