= Alexander Ramsay-Gibson-Maitland =

Scottish Liberal politician

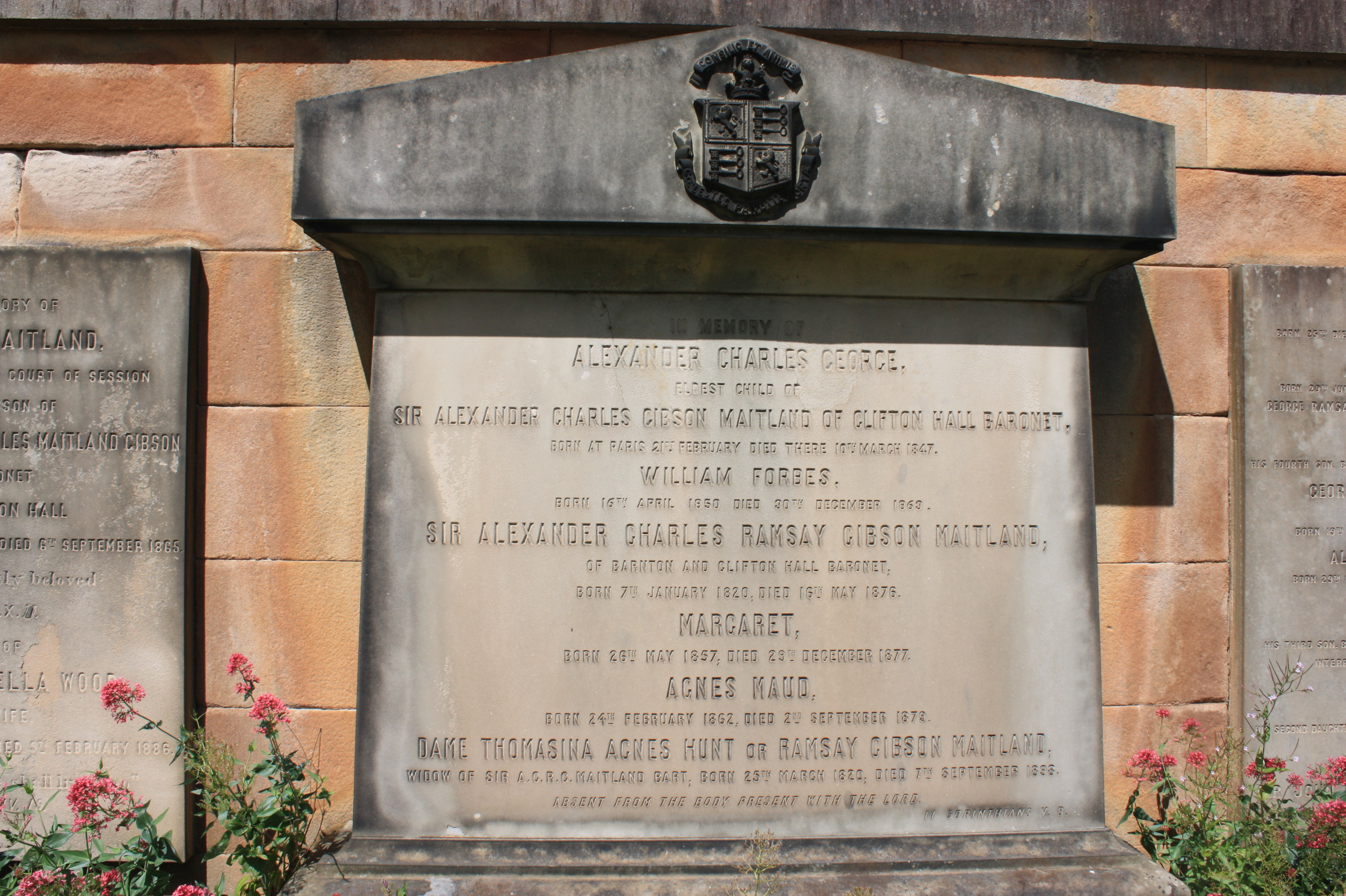
Grave of Sir Alexander Charles Gibson Maitland

Sir Alexander Charles Ramsay-Gibson-Maitland, 3rd baronet (7 January 1820 – 16 May 1876) was a Scottish Liberal politician who sat in the House of Commons from 1868 to 1874.

== Early life ==
Alexander Ramsay-Gibson-Maitland was born Maitland-Gibson, the son of Alexander Maitland-Gibson of Clifton Hall, Midlothian. He was educated at Edinburgh Academy and at Weimer College and became a lieutenant in the 79th Highlanders. He succeeded his grandfather, the 2nd baronet, in the Maitland baronetcy of Clifton in 1848.

In 1866, he assumed the surname of Ramsay before that of Gibson-Maitland, when he succeeded to the estates of Ramsay of Barnton. In 1819, Alexander Charles Maitland-Gibson, a younger son of the 1st Baronet, had married Susan Ramsay. As all other male Ramsay descendants were deceased by 1866, the Ramsay titles and lands eventually passed to Sir Alexander Gibson-Maitland, 3rd Baronet of Barnton, Sauchie and Bannockburn.

== Career ==
He was a Deputy Lieutenant and J.P. for Edinburgh and Stirlingshire, a colonel of the Stirlingshire Militia and captain in the Midlothian Yeomanry Cavalry.

At the 1868 general election, Ramsay-Gibson-Maitland was elected Member of Parliament for Midlothian. He held the seat until 1874.

== Personal life ==
Ramsay-Gibson-Maitland married Thomasina Agnes Hunt, daughter of James Hunt of Pittencrieff in 1841.

Ramsay-Gibson-Maitland died at the age of 56. He is buried in the Grange Cemetery in Edinburgh against the north wall, towards the west entrance.

Parliament of the United Kingdom
Preceded by Earl of Dalkeith	Member of Parliament for Midlothian; 1868 – 1874	Succeeded by Earl of Dalkeith
Baronetage of the United Kingdom
Preceded by Alexander Gibson-Maitland	Baronet (of Clifton); 1848–1876	Succeeded by James Ramsay-Gibson-Maitland
