= Perring baronets =

Set index for Perring baronets

There have been two baronetcies created for persons with the surname Perring, both in the Baronetage of the United Kingdom. One creation is extinct while one is still extant.

- Perring baronets of Membland (1808)
- Perring baronets of Frensham Manor (1963)
