= Cobbinshaw Reservoir =

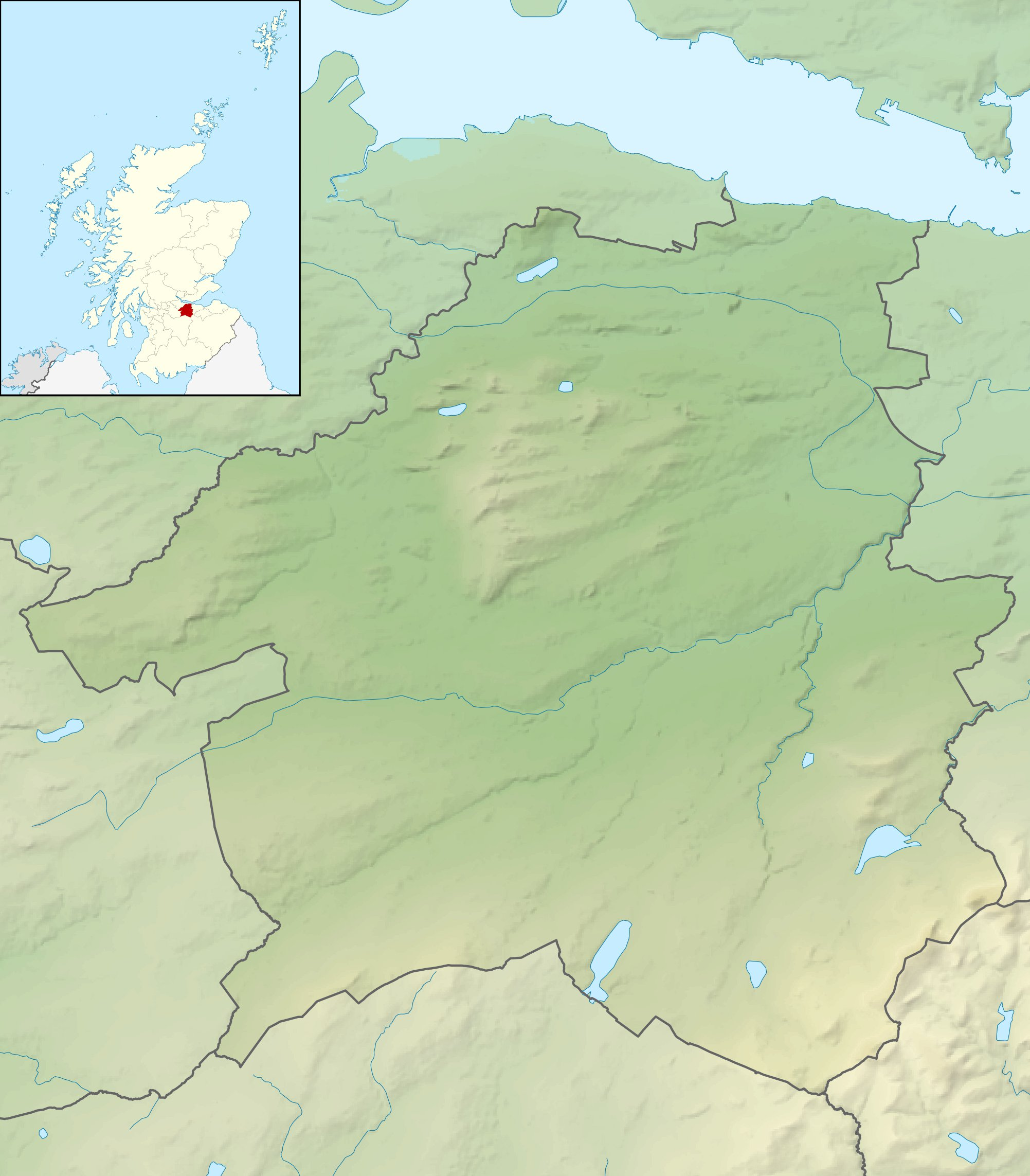
- Location within West Lothian
- Location: West Lothian
- Coordinates: 55°48′25″N 3°33′55″W
- Type: reservoir
- Basin countries: Scotland

Cobbinshaw Reservoir is a reservoir in West Lothian, Scotland. It is situated near the Pentland Hills, 5 km south of West Calder. The 310-acre (1.3 km^{2}) site is a Site of Special Scientific Interest (SSSI) and is popular with wildfowl.

== History ==
Cobbinshaw Reservoir was built by James Jardine to feed the Union Canal via the Bog Burn, Murieston Water, and through Mid Calder to the Almondell Aqueduct and Lin's Mill Canal Feeder which feeds into the canal just east of the Almond Aqueduct.

== See also ==
- Eliburn Reservoir
- Harperrig Reservoir
- List of reservoirs and dams in the United Kingdom
- List of places in South Lanarkshire
