= Ritchie baronets =

Extinct baronetcy in the Baronetage of the United Kingdom

There have been two Ritchie baronetcies created in the Baronetage of the United Kingdom for members of the Ritchie family. Both creations are extinct.

The Ritchie baronetcy, of Highlands and of Queensborough-terrace, was created in the Baronetage of the United Kingdom on 15 December 1903 for James Thomson Ritchie, who served as Lord Mayor of London from 1903 to 1904. He was the elder brother of Charles Ritchie, 1st Baron Ritchie of Dundee.

After Sir James Thomson Ritchie's death in 1912, his son, businessman James William Ritchie, made claim to the title, which was accepted. However, he was created a baronet in his own right in 1918 "to regularize an informality in the previous title." The Ritchie baronetcy, of Highlands, was created for him in the Baronetage of the United Kingdom on 23 January 1918. He was chairman of the Milners' Safe Company. This title became extinct on the death of the second Baronet in 1991.

== Ritchie baronets, of Highlands and of Queensborough-terrace (1903) ==
- Sir James Thomson Ritchie, 1st Baronet (1835–1912)
- Sir James William Ritchie, 2nd Baronet (1868–1937), granted a new baronetcy in 1918

== Ritchie baronets, of Highlands (1918) ==
- Sir James William Ritchie, 1st Baronet (1868–1937)
- Sir James Edward Thomson Ritchie, 2nd Baronet (1902–1991)

Baronetage of the United Kingdom
Preceded by Bingham baronets	Ritchie baronets of Highlands and of Queensborough-terrace; 15 December 1903	Succeeded by Wills baronets
