= Daniel Ellis (botanist) =

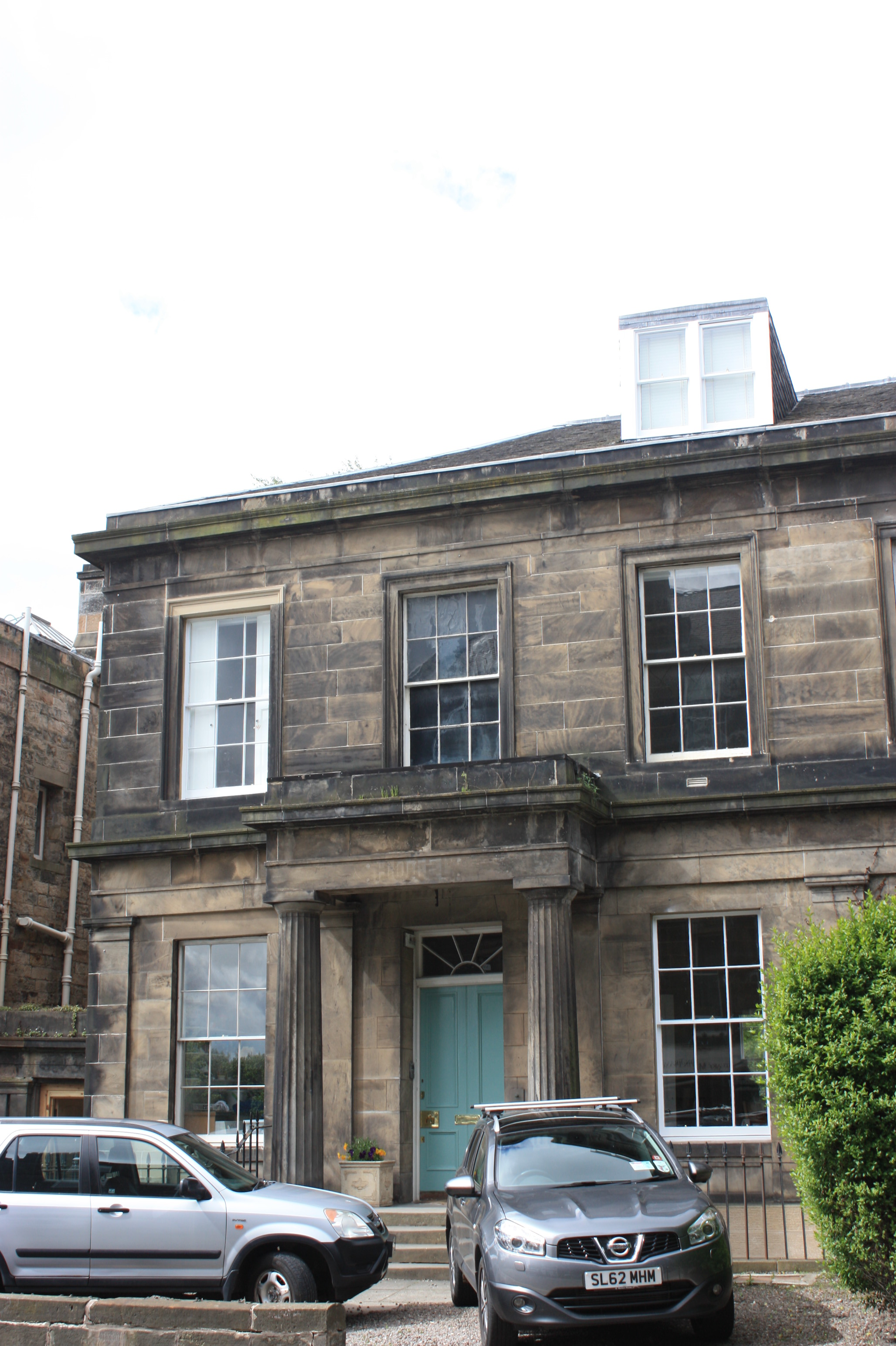
The home of Daniel Ellis at 13 Inverleith Row, Edinburgh

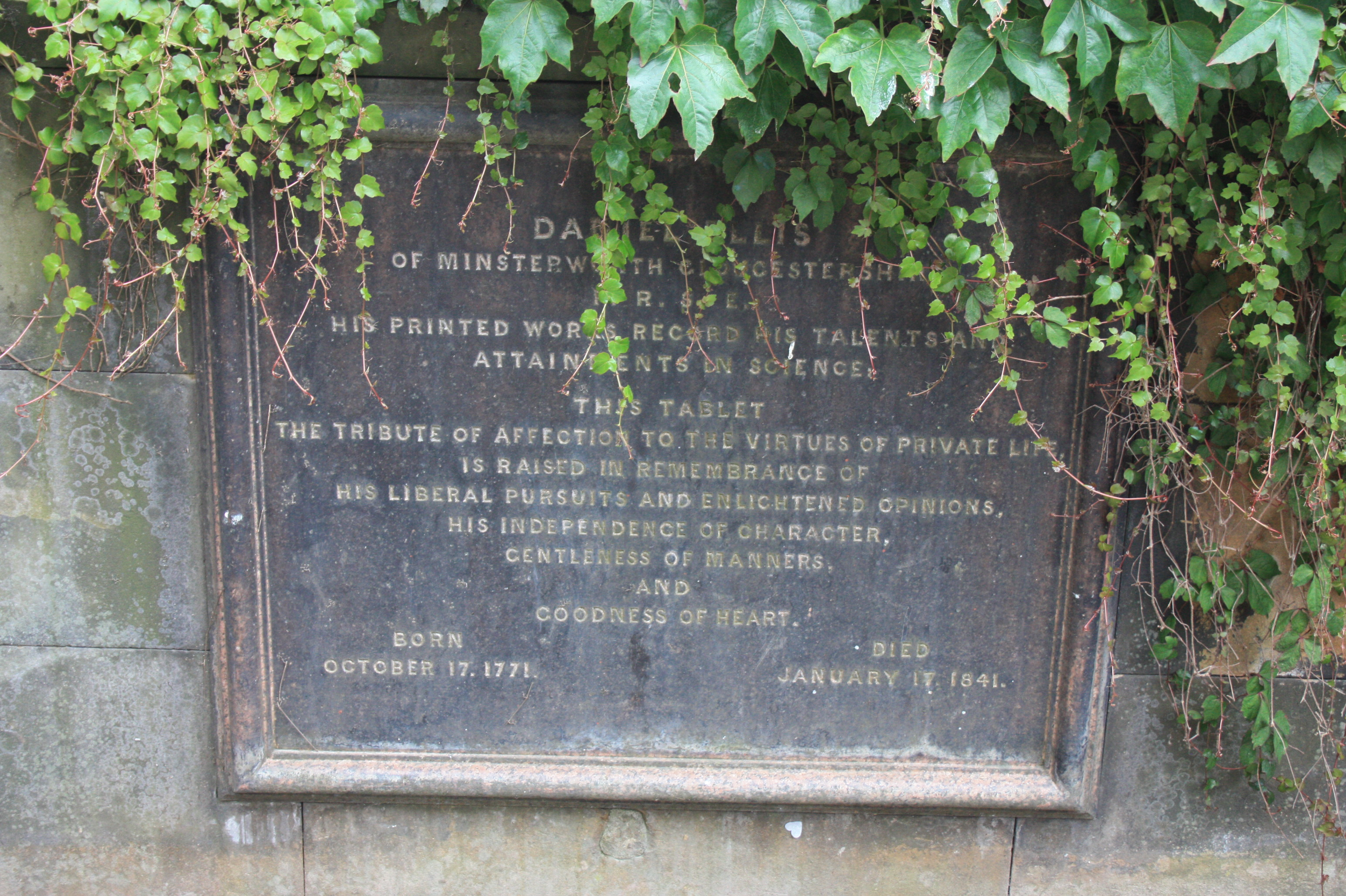
The grave of Daniel Ellis, St John's, Edinburgh

Daniel Ellis FRSE (1771–1841) was a British medical doctor, aerologist, botanist and writer. He spent most of his career in Scotland and was an important contributor to Edinburgh's Encyclopædia Britannica (6th edition). He was president of the Royal Medical Society in 1806.

He appears to have also been a skilful mezzotint artist.

== Life ==
He was born in Minsterworth in Gloucestershire on 17 October 1771.

He studied medicine in London including Anatomy training under Sir Astley Cooper.

He received a commission in the Essex Cavalry as an Army Surgeon around 1796 but appears not to have served abroad and saw service only in Ireland and Scotland. The regiment moved to the west of Scotland to deal with an issue with the local militia and from there were sent to Ireland to quell the Irish Rebellion of 1798. The regiment was disbanded on its return to England and Ellis then returned to Scotland in 1801 to study further, partly under Prof James Jeffray. He qualified MD at Glasgow University in 1804.

Having failed to obtain a post in his desired destination of Cheltenham he instead moved to Edinburgh. However his interests here quickly moved from medicine to botany, becoming a friend of the Edinburgh botanist Patrick Neill.

He was elected a Fellow of the Royal Society of Edinburgh in 1812, one of his proposers being John Playfair.

His Edinburgh friends included Dr John Gordon (whose memoir he wrote), Dr John Murray, Alexander Cowan and the engineer James Jardine.

He died in his house at 13 Inverleith Row, Edinburgh on 17 January 1841 following a ten-day illness, and is buried in St John's Episcopal Churchyard immediately south-west of the church undercroft. The grave is frequently obscured by tables and chairs from the church cafe.

== Publications ==
See

- An Inquiry into the Changes Induced on Atmospheric Air by the Germination of Seeds, the Vegetation of Plants, and the Respiration of Animals (1807)
- Further Inquiries into the Changes Induced on Atmospheric Air by the Germination of Seeds, the Vegetation of Plants, and the Respiration of Animals (1811)
- Memoir of the Life and Writing of John Gordon MD FRSE (1823)
- 6th Edition of Encyclopædia Britannica: Sections on Vegetable Anatomy and Vegetable Physiology
- Description of a Plant Case, for Growing without Fresh supplies of Water and Air: Gardener’s Magazine vol 15 (1839)
