= Sir James Ritchie, 1st Baronet =

Scottish businessman and baronet

Sir James Ritchie Bt
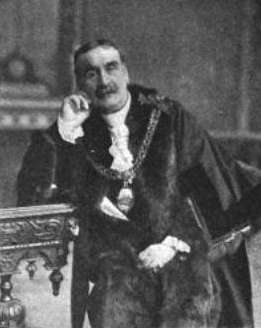
- In The Sketch, 11 November 1896
- Born: 21 September 1833; Angus, Scotland
- Died: 18 September 1912 (aged 78); Shanklin, England
- Occupation(s): Businessman, politician
- Spouse: Lydia Rebecca Lemon (m. 1858)
- Children: 9

Sir James Thomson Ritchie, 1st Baronet (21 September 1833 – 18 September 1912) was a Scottish businessman who was the 576th Lord Mayor of London.

He was born in Angus, the second son of William Ritchie, a landed proprietor, of Rockhill House, Broughty Ferry, Forfarshire, head of the firm of William Ritchie & Son of London and Dundee, East India merchants, jute spinners, and manufacturers. His younger brother would be ennobled as Charles Ritchie, 1st Baron Ritchie of Dundee.

James became a partner in his father's business, based in London. He became an alderman of the City of London, served as Sheriff of London for 1896–97, and was knighted in 1897. He was elected Lord Mayor of London for 1903–04, and was created a baronet, of Highlands, Shanklin, on the Isle of Wight, on 15 December 1903.

In 1858, he married Lydia Rebecca Lemon, daughter of James Lemon. They had two sons and seven daughters. He died at Shanklin on 18 September 1912, at which point the baronetcy expired, despite having living male heirs. His eldest son, James William Ritchie, was created a baronet in his own right in 1918 "to regularize an informality in the previous title."

Civic offices
Preceded by Marcus Samuel	Lord Mayor of London; 1903–1904	Succeeded by John Pound
Baronetage of the United Kingdom
New creation	Baronet (of Lees House); 1903–1912	Extinct
