= Bavelaw Castle =

Historic house in the City of Edinburgh council area, Scotland

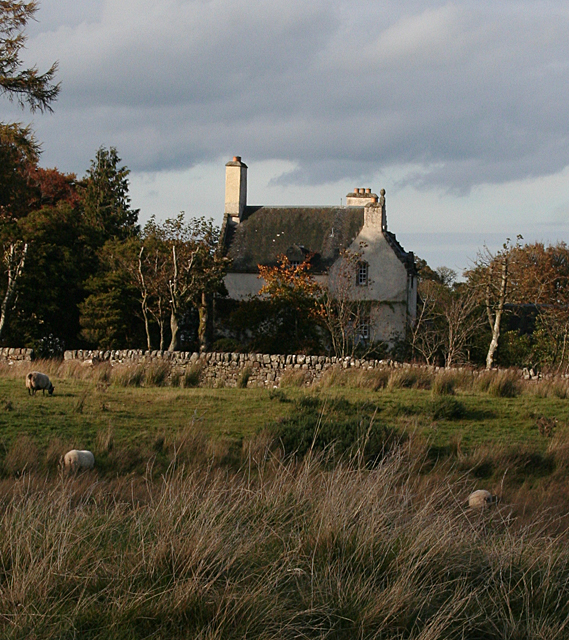

- Location within the City of Edinburgh council area

General information
- Coordinates: 55.8510715°N 3.3315396°W

Bavelaw Castle is a historic house in the City of Edinburgh Council area, Scotland. It is north of Hare Hill in the Pentland Hills, four miles west of Penicuik, and two miles south of Balerno, above Threipmuir Reservoir. It was designated as a Category A listed building in 1971.

== History ==
An early structure on the site was owned by the Braids, then by the Fairlies, but passed to the Forresters of Niddry by marriage. From them, it went to the Mowbrays of Barnbougle in the 16th century. Before Easter and Wester Bavelaw were granted by King James VI to Laurence Scott of Harperrig in 1628, a 16th-century L-plan tower house had been built by Walter Dundas. Both Mary, Queen of Scots, and James VI both stayed at Bavelaw, reputedly using it as a hunting lodge.

Scott enlarged the tower house after his acquisition, possibly adding a small wing at the south-east angle. Bavelaw fell into a ruinous state, but was restored and extended in 1900 by Sir Robert Lorimer, linking the outbuildings to the main building, adding bigger windows and a turret to make the attic larger, and converting the basement. The building was further altered in 1938 by the architectural firm Dick Peddie & McKay.

== Description ==
The harled rubble walls of the tower are three storeys tall, not including the attic. A circular tower extends from the north-eastern corner of the main block and a small one-storey wing of a later date projects from the south-east. The ground-floor rooms of the tower are vaulted and that of the northern chamber is lower than the other one, which may indicate the nucleus of the original structure. The difference in height is repeated on the floors above and the northern first-floor chamber known as Queen Mary's Room.

== See also ==
- List of castles in Scotland
