= Bingham baronets of West Lea (1903) =

Escutcheon of the Bingham baronets of West Lea

The Bingham baronetcy, of West Lea in the Parish of Ranmoor in the City of Sheffield, was created in the Baronetage of the United Kingdom on 12 December 1903 for John Bingham. He was a leading figure in the Sheffield cutlery industry and pioneer in the electroplating industry. The title became extinct on the death of the 2nd Baronet in 1945.

== Bingham baronets, of West Lea (1903) ==
- Sir John Edward Bingham, 1st Baronet (1839–1915)
- Sir Albert Edward Bingham, 2nd Baronet (1868–1945)

Baronetage of the United Kingdom
Preceded by Knowles baronets	Bingham baronets of West Lea; 12 December 1903	Succeeded by Ritchie baronets
