= Sir Alexander Maitland, 1st Baronet =

Sir Alexander Maitland, 1st Baronet (21 March 1728 – 15 February 1820) was a general in the British Army and the first of the Maitland baronets of Clifton. He was the fifth son of Charles Maitland, 6th Earl of Lauderdale.

== Life ==
Maitland's promotions were as follows:

- Colonel - 19 February 1762
- Major-General - 25 May 1772
- Lieutenant-General - 29 August 1777
- General - 12 October 1793

He was Colonel of the 49th Regiment of Foot from 1768 to 1820, a total of 52 years.

Maitland was made Baronet of Clifton in the County of Midlothian, in the Baronetage of the United Kingdom, on 30 November 1818.

In 1819, Alexander Charles Maitland-Gibson, a younger son of the 1st Baronet, married Susan Ramsay. As all other male Ramsay descendants were deceased by 1866, the Ramsay titles and lands passed to the 3rd Baronet, who then assumed the surname of Ramsay before that of Gibson-Maitland and succeeded to the estates of Ramsay of Barnton.

Sir Alexander Maitland, 1st Baronet, died on 15 February 1820 and is buried at St Andrew's church, Totteridge, in north London. A memorial plaque inside the church remembers him and other members of his family.

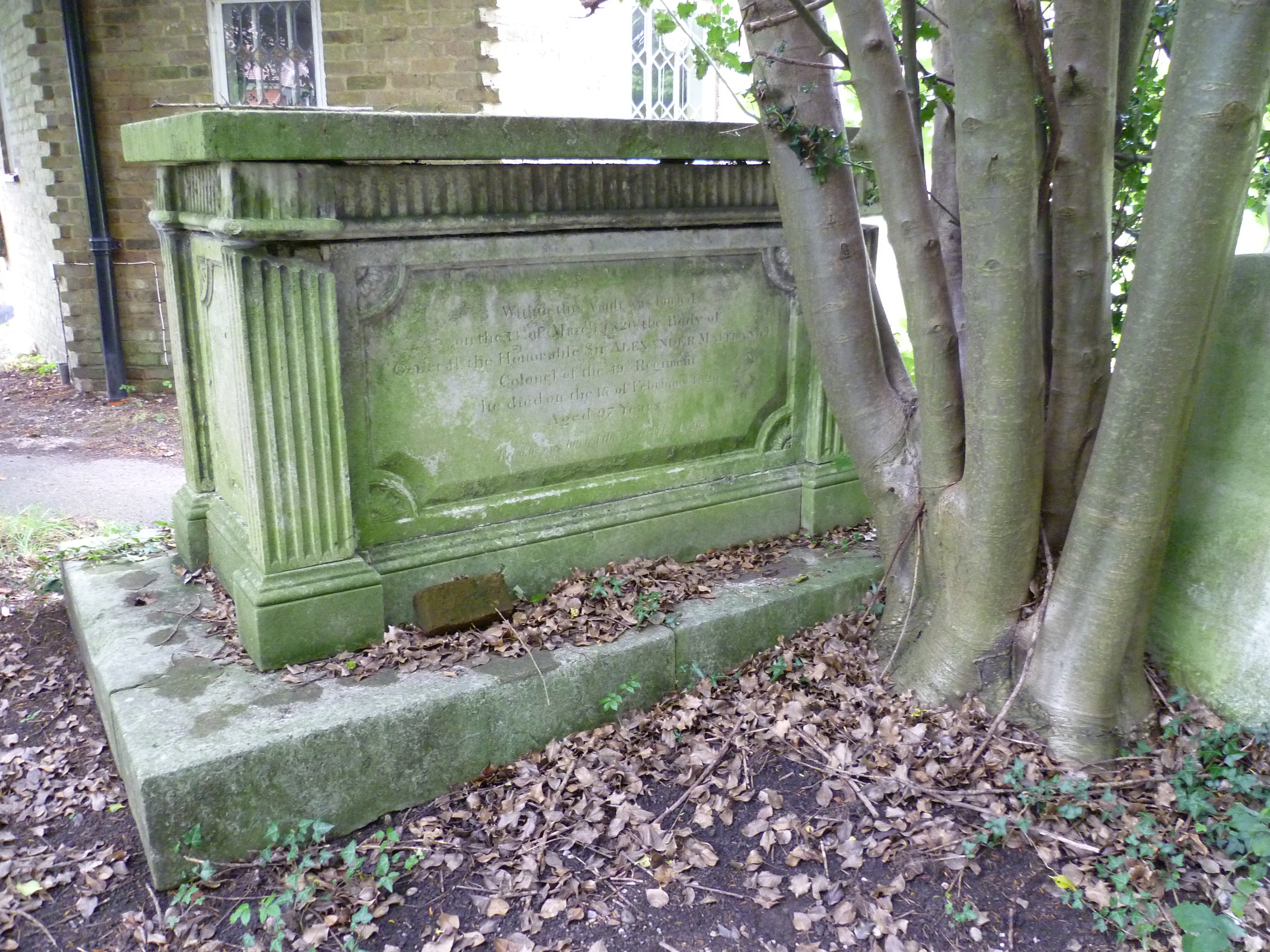
Sir Alexander Maitland's grave, St Andrew's church, Totteridge

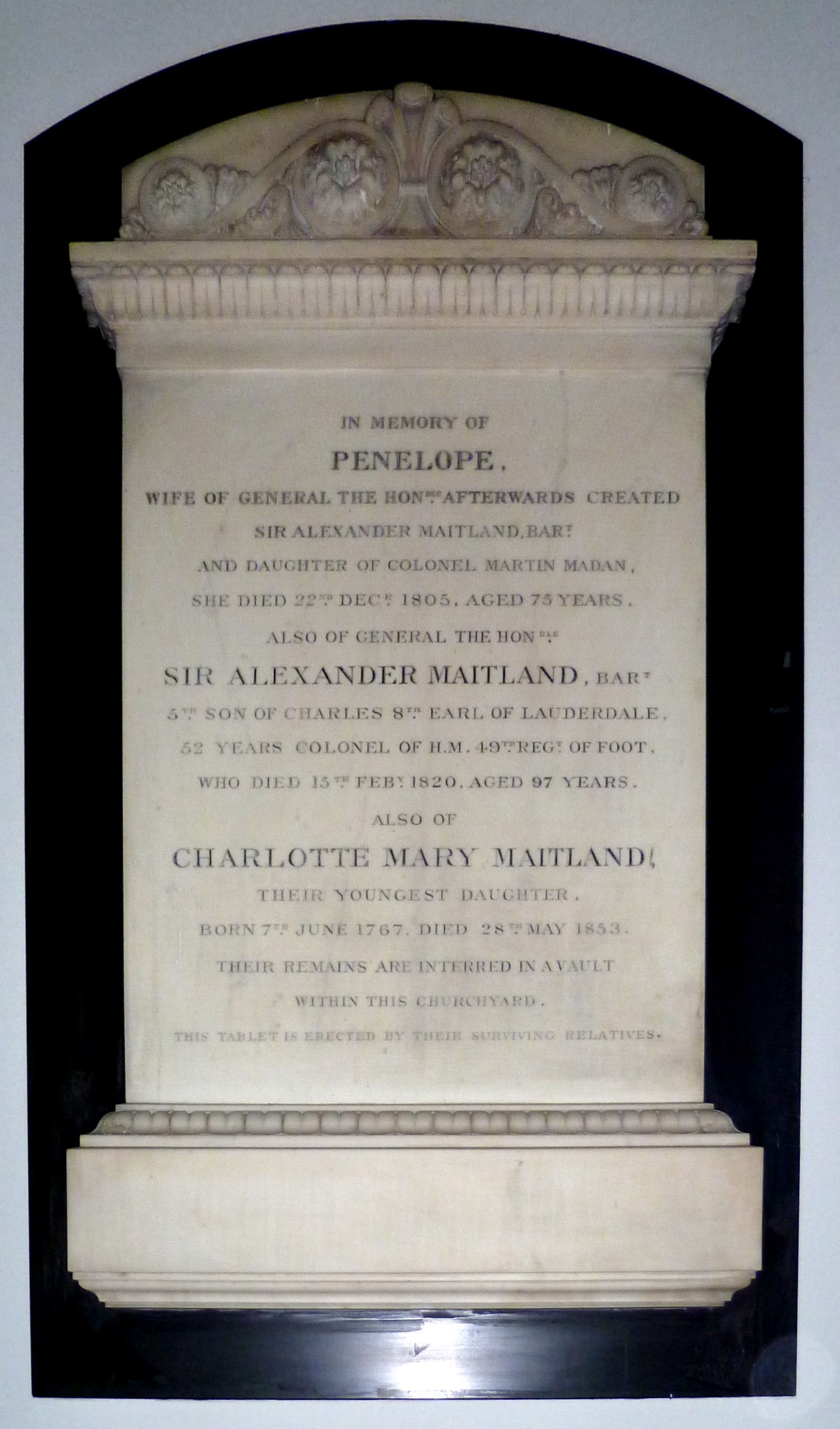
Maitland memorial plaque St Andrew's church, Totteridge

Baronetage of the United Kingdom
New creation	Baronet (of Clifton); 1818–1820	Succeeded by Alexander Charles Gibson-Maitland
Military offices
Preceded by David Graeme	Colonel of the 49th Regiment of Foot; 1768–1820	Succeeded by Sir Miles Nightingall
