= Sir Frederick Hoare, 1st Baronet =

Sir Frederick Alfred Hoare, 1st Baronet (1913–1986) was an English banker, managing partner of C. Hoare & Co. from 1947, and Lord Mayor of London in 1961–2. He was known as Derick Hoare.

== Background and early life ==
He was a great-grandson of Henry Hoare of Staplehurst, partner in Hoare's Bank. His father was Frederick Henry Hoare (1871–1955) of Ewshot, who married in 1912 Dorothy or Charlotte Burley, daughter of the late George Christopher Burley of Westbourne Park, London.

Frederick Hoare was educated at Wellington College, and entered Hoare's Bank in 1931 as a clerk. He worked as a Banker's Agent from 1936.In 1958 he was knighted.

== City of London posts ==
In 1948, Hoare was elected a Common Councilman of the City of London; and in 1950 he became an Alderman for the ward of Farringdon Without, holding the position until 1971. He served as Sheriff of the City of London in 1956.

== Mayoral term ==
Hoare's mayoral term saw the inaugural City of London Festival, with artistic director Ian Hunter.

At Mansion House, Hoare adopted the slogan "youth and leadership". He employed George Chatterton, and a consequence was the foundation of the Upward Bound Trust to make gliding accessible to young people. Hoare continued to support it.

A chess player, President of the British Chess Federation from 1964 to 1967, Hoare took part in a simultaneous display given by Mikhail Botvinnik, wearing his chain of office.

== Later life ==
Hoare was created a baronet, of Fleet Street, on 6 December 1962. He remained a managing partner of Hoare's Bank to the end of his life.

== Family ==
Hoare was three times married.

- Firstly, in 1939, to Nora(h) Mary Wheeler (died 1973), known as the charity founder Mary Hoare, Lady Hoare. Her Trust for thalidomide victims arose from an appeal she launched as Lady Mayoress. The couple had two daughters.
- Secondly, in 1974, as her third husband, to Oonagh Alice Dew (died 1980).
- Thirdly, in 1984, as her second husband, to Sarah Lindsay Bamber. The marriage was dissolved in 1986.

== Notes ==
Honorary titles
Preceded by Bernard Waley-Cohen	Lord Mayor of London; 1961–1962	Succeeded by Sir Ralph Perring
Baronetage of the United Kingdom
New creation	Baronet (of Fleet Street); 1962–1986	Extinct
