= Mary Hoare, Lady Hoare =

Lady Mayoress of London

Lady Mary Hoare (née Nora Mary Wheeler; 1916 – 21 September 1973) OBE was the Lady Mayoress of London and advocate for thalidomide-affected babies and children. She founded a charity for thalidomide-affected children, the Lady Hoare Trust, which she managed from her home. The trust organised home visits and research into artificial limbs in order to encourage independent living at home and integration in mainstream schools.

Lady Hoare was the daughter of Addison James Wheeler and the wife of Sir Frederick Alfred Hoare, 1st Bt. (1913–1986), who was a partner in the family business (Hoare's Bank). The couple lived at 78 Hamilton Terrace during the 1960s and had two daughters. Sir Frederick became Lord Mayor of London in 1962.

== Death and legacy ==
Lady Mary Hoare was awarded an OBE in 1972. She died of cancer one year later at age 57. Her husband remarried, in 1974, to Oonah Alice Sladen. At the time of her death, the trust cared for approximately 900 children.
