= Wills baronets of Hazelwood and Clapton-in-Gordano (1904) =

Arms of Wills baronets "of Hazelwood" (1904): Gules, three suns in splendour fesswise between two griffins passant or

The Wills baronetcy, of Hazelwood Stoke Bishop, in Westbury-on-Trym in the County of Gloucester, and of Clapton-in-Gordano in the County of Somerset, was created in the Baronetage of the United Kingdom on 19 August 1904 for Edward Payson Wills, the elder brother of the 1st Baronet of the 1897 creation. He was a director of the Imperial Tobacco Company.

The 2nd and 3rd Baronets were also directors of the Imperial Tobacco Company. The latter also served as Lord-Lieutenant of Wiltshire from 1930 to 1942.

== Wills baronets, of Hazelwood and Clapton-in-Gordano (1904) ==
- Sir Edward Payson Wills, 1st Baronet (1834–1910)
- Sir Edward Chaning Wills, 2nd Baronet (1861–1921)
- Sir Ernest Wills, 3rd Baronet (1869–1958)
- Sir (Ernest) Edward de Winton Wills, 4th Baronet (1903–1983)
- Sir (David) Seton Wills, 5th Baronet (1939–2023)
- James Seton Wills, 6th Baronet (born 1970)

The heir apparent is the present holder's son Jack Seton Wills (born 2005).

== Notes ==
Baronetage of the United Kingdom
Preceded by Ritchie baronets	Wills baronets of Hazelwood and Clapton-in-Gordano; 19 August 1904	Succeeded by Ropner baronets
