= St Andrew's Church, Totteridge =

St Andrew's church, Totteridge
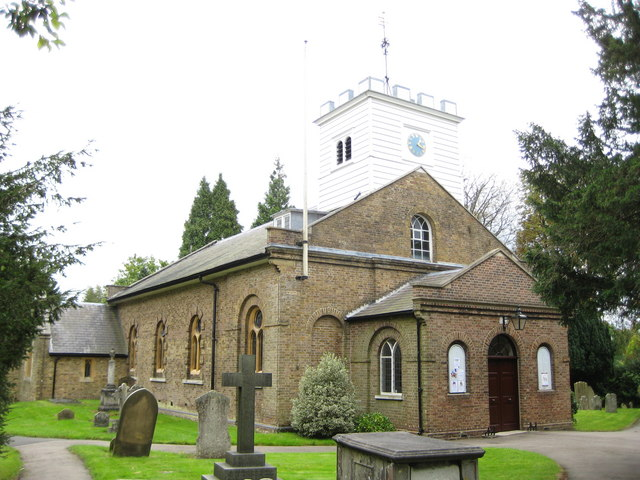
- St Andrew's Church, Totteridge
- St Andrew's church, Totteridge
- 51°37′56″N 0°12′01″W
- Country: England
- Denomination: Church of England
- Website: Official website

Architecture
- Heritage designation: Grade II

Administration
- Diocese: St Albans
- Archdeaconry: Hertford
- Deanery: Barnet
- Parish: Totteridge

Clergy
- Vicar: Vacant

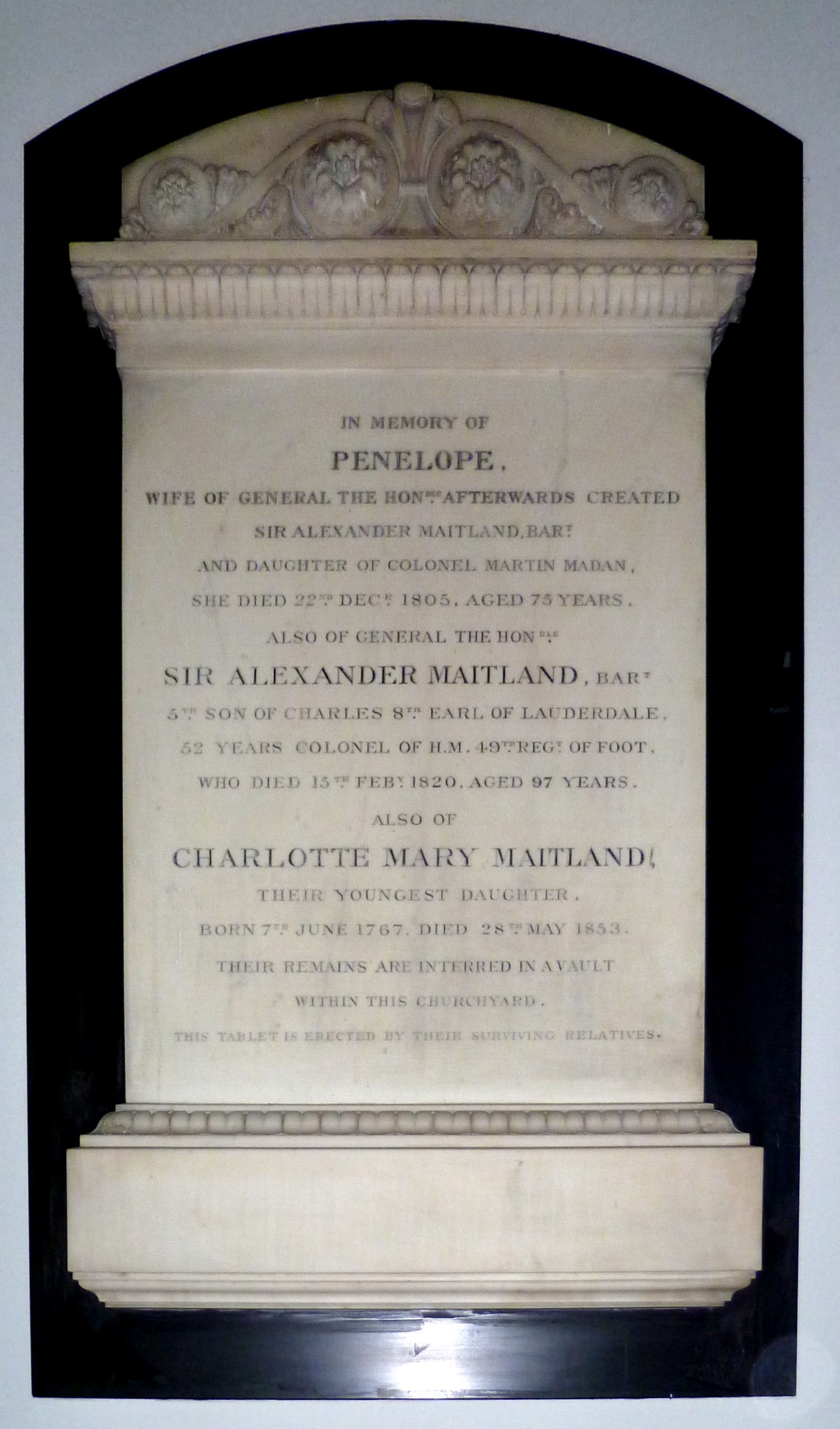
Memorial plaque to the Maitland baronets of Clifton inside the church

St Andrew's is the Church of England church for Totteridge in north London. It is located in the Diocese of St Albans, one of the few churches in Greater London to have this distinction.

== History ==
The church was probably first mentioned in 1250, in a document which records Totteridge Church as belonging to St Etheldreda's, Hatfield from whence it took its dedication. St Etheldreda was born near Newmarket in Suffolk about the year 630 and was the daughter of the Christian king of East Anglia. Over the years, the dedication was corrupted to St Audrey's and wills from the time of the Protestant Reformation refer to the Church by both names. Then at some time between the Reformation and the late 17th century the dedication changed to St Andrew possibly when only biblical saints were in favour and when the written word “Audrey” might well be transcribed as “Andrew” without any objection.

In 1650 the Commonwealth Commissioners recommended that Totteridge Church should be detached from Hatfield and made a separate parish but it required the lapse of nearly two and half centuries and the intervention of an unhappy feud, in which the 2nd Marquess of Salisbury (as patron), the Bishop of Rochester and the Rector of Hatfield faced the uncompromising parishioners of Totteridge (in angry support of a succession of bewildered curates) to give effect to that recommendation. So, in 1892, by Order in Council, Totteridge became a separate parish with a vicar appointed to care for the souls of the 785 inhabitants.

The present weathervane dates from 1706 and bears the initials R.B., for the then churchwarden, Richard Burdett. In 1790 the complete rebuilding and enlarging of the church was undertaken. One of the most active members of the vestry was William Manning, Governor of the Bank of England and father of Henry Manning, the future cardinal. The whole of the present church, therefore, dates from the 18th and 19th centuries.

In 1790 the present nave was built. The west porch was added in 1845, when the parapets were removed. In 1869 the east wall was taken down and the present chancel built, and at the same time the spire was removed, the smaller vestry and the organ chamber were built, stone windows were inserted, an open timber roof was erected over the nave, and a west gallery was demolished. The larger north vestry was built in 1897.

In 1908 the church was panelled with oak. In 1925 tower clocks were donated from the former stables of the Poynter's Grove being demolished by developers at that time nearby. In 1952 the tower was rebuilt and two piers were introduced at the west end of the church to support the weight. The galleries and associated woodwork there were removed.

The lychgate to the churchyard dates from 1930; it was designed by Sir Charles Nicholson and erected in memory of Lady Barrett of Totteridge Park.

The graveyard contains an ancient yew tree thought to be 2000 years old, and if so, the oldest tree in London. It is one of the Great Trees of London.

The church has been a Grade II listed building since 1950.

== Notable burials at St Andrew's ==
- Sir Alexander Maitland, 1st Baronet (1728–1820) is buried in the churchyard. A memorial plaque inside the church remembers him and other members of his family.
- Anthony Barton (1913–1943), Royal Air Force officer who won two DFCs.
- Dai Rees (1913–1983), Captain of the 1957 Great Britain Ryder Cup team and winner of the 1957 BBC Sports Personality of the Year award.
