= A. R. H. Barton =

British World War II flying ace

Anthony Richard Henry Barton
- Born: 17 December 1913; London, England
- Died: 4 April 1943 (aged 29); Llanbedr, Wales
- Burial place: St Andrew's church, Totteridge
- Military career
- Branch: Royal Air Force (1940–1943); Royal Navy (1931–1940)
- Rank: Squadron Leader
- Commands: No. 126 Squadron
- Conflicts: Second World War: Battle of Britain; Siege of Malta
- Awards: Distinguished Flying Cross and Bar

Anthony Richard Henry Barton DFC & Bar (17 December 1913 – 4 April 1943) was an English flying ace who served with the Royal Air Force (RAF) during the Second World War. He was credited with having shot down at least six aircraft.

Born in London, Barton joined the Royal Navy (RN) in 1931 and subsequently served in the Fleet Air Arm once he gained his wings. In July 1940, he resigned his commission in the RN and joined the RAF as a pilot officer. Initially posted to No. 32 Squadron and later serving with No. 253 Squadron, he achieved a number of aerial victories during the Battle of Britain. He was wounded in September and was off operations until February 1941. He went to Malta in March 1942, as a reinforcement for the RAF garrison there defending the island against bombing raids mounted by the Axis forces. During his service on Malta, he achieved further aerial victories and commanded No. 126 Squadron for a time. Returning to the United Kingdom in August, he was killed in April 1943 in an aircraft accident.

== Early life ==
Anthony Richard Henry Barton was born in London on 17 December 1913 to Henry and Roslind Barton. After completing his schooling, he went to the Royal Naval College at Dartmouth and, upon graduation in 1931, joined the Royal Navy (RN) as a midshipman. He served for three years on HMS Warspite, HMS Valiant and HMS Dragon. Interested in flying, he gained his pilot's licence in April 1934 and two years later was transferred to the Fleet Air Arm. For his flying training, he was granted a temporary commission in the Royal Air Force (RAF) as a flying officer.

His flight training was at No. 1 Flying Training School at Leuchars and in August 1937, Barton proceeded to the RAF station at Gosport to briefly serve as a supernumerary pilot. In October, and now a lieutenant, he was posted to 823 Naval Air Squadron.

== Second World War ==
Shortly after the outbreak of the Second World War Barton was assigned back to Warspite but in February 1940 was at Malta with a posting to HMS St Angelo. Another period on Warspite followed and then from May to June he served at HMS Daedalus. In July, Barton relinquished his commission in the RN and transferred to the Royal Air Force, where he was commissioned as a pilot officer. After a period of training on the Hawker Hurricane fighter at No. 6 Operational Training Unit (OTU), he was posted to No. 32 Squadron in early August.

=== Battle of Britain ===
At the time of Barton's posting there, No. 32 Squadron was stationed at Biggin Hill and was at the forefront of the Luftwaffe's aerial campaign over southeast England, being scrambled several times a day to intercept incoming bombing raids. He claimed a Messerschmitt Bf 109 fighter as destroyed over Dover on 11 August but was himself shot down the next day. A pair of Bf 109s were shot down by Barton to the south of Biggin Hill on 16 August and two days later, on what became known as The Hardest Day, destroyed a Junkers Ju 88 medium bomber over the coast to the south of the squadron's airfield. He damaged a Bf 109 on 24 August and the following day, over the English Channel, damaged a Henschel Hs 126 reconnaissance aircraft. The squadron was sent to Acklington in the Midlands for a rest at the end of the month.

On 10 September Barton was transferred to No. 253 Squadron, which operated Hurricanes from Kenley. The day after his arrival there, he was one of ten pilots that combined to shoot down three Dornier Do 17 medium bombers. This was followed by his destruction of a Do 17 over the Thames estuary but his Hurricane received damage during the encounter which necessitated a crash landing at Hawkinge. He was wounded on 20 September during an aerial engagement and as a result had to be hospitalised.

Discharged from hospital care in early October, Barton returned to his squadron at Kenley but did not fly operationally again until February 1941. By this time No. 253 Squadron was based at Skeabrae in the Orkney Islands and engaged mostly on protective patrols over convoys in the region. He was posted to No. 124 Squadron as a flight commander upon its formation in May. This unit was based at Castletown and, equipped with Supermarine Spitfire fighters, became operational in late June, carrying out patrols along the coast and providing aerial cover for shipping convoys. It later operated from Biggin Hill as part of that station's fighter wing.

=== Malta ===
In March 1942, Barton was posted to Malta as a reinforcement for the RAF garrison there. He led a flight of Spitfires, taking off from the flight deck of the aircraft carrier HMS Eagle, to the island, then under an aerial siege mounted by the Luftwaffe and the Regia Aeronautica (Royal Italian Air Force), on 29 March. Assigned to No. 126 Squadron, he was quickly in action, for on 2 April he damaged a Ju 88 that had bombed Grand Harbour. He damaged another on 9 April. The next day, the formal announcement of his award of the Distinguished Flying Cross (DFC), in acknowledgement of his service of the preceding two years, was made. The citation, published in The London Gazette, read:

This officer has proved himself to be a keen and courageous pilot. He fought, with great distinction in the Battle of Britain and destroyed 5 enemy aircraft before he himself was shot down and severely wounded. Flight Lieutenant Barton resumed operational flying in February, 1941, since when he has participated in many sorties against the enemy. Throughout, he has set a magnificent example.

— London Gazette, No. 35518, 10 April 1942

Barton damaged two Junkers Ju 87 dive bombers on 22 April and two days later shot down a Ju 87. He also shared in the probable destruction of a Ju 88 and damaged another. He damaged a further Ju 88 on 30 April. He was then promoted to squadron leader and given command of No. 126 Squadron, succeeding Edward Gracie. He damaged a Macchi C.202 fighter on 9 May. He claimed a Bf 109 as probably destroyed on 10 May, and again the following day. His final aerial victory was on 14 May, and was another Bf 109 that was probably destroyed. At the end of the month, Barton along with a couple of other senior pilots from his squadron were flown to Gibraltar; they were to lead a batch of over 30 Spitfires off Eagle as reinforcements for Malta. The delivery flight departed the aircraft carrier on 3 June but was intercepted by the Luftwaffe en route, and four Spitfires were shot down. His service on Malta ended at the end of June and he subsequently returned to the United Kingdom. In acknowledgement of his services on Malta, he was awarded a Bar to his DFC in July. The published citation read:

Whilst operating from Malta, Squadron Leader Barton has destroyed at least 5 enemy aircraft, 2 of which he destroyed in one combat. He has at all times displayed the greatest determination to inflict loss on the enemy.

— London Gazette, No. 35621, 7 July 1942

=== Later war service ===
Barton was posted as an instructor to No. 53 Operational Training Unit at Llanbedr, in Wales. He was killed in an aircraft accident on 4 April 1943 when as he made an emergency landing in his Spitfire, it collided with a fighter attempting to take off. He is buried at St Andrew's church, Totteridge, survived by his wife. He is credited with having shot down six aircraft, probably destroying three aircraft with a share in a fourth probably destroyed, and nine damaged.
