= Harperrig Reservoir =

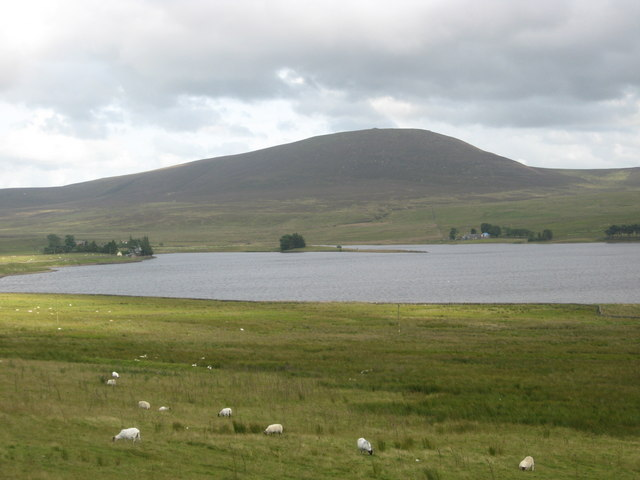

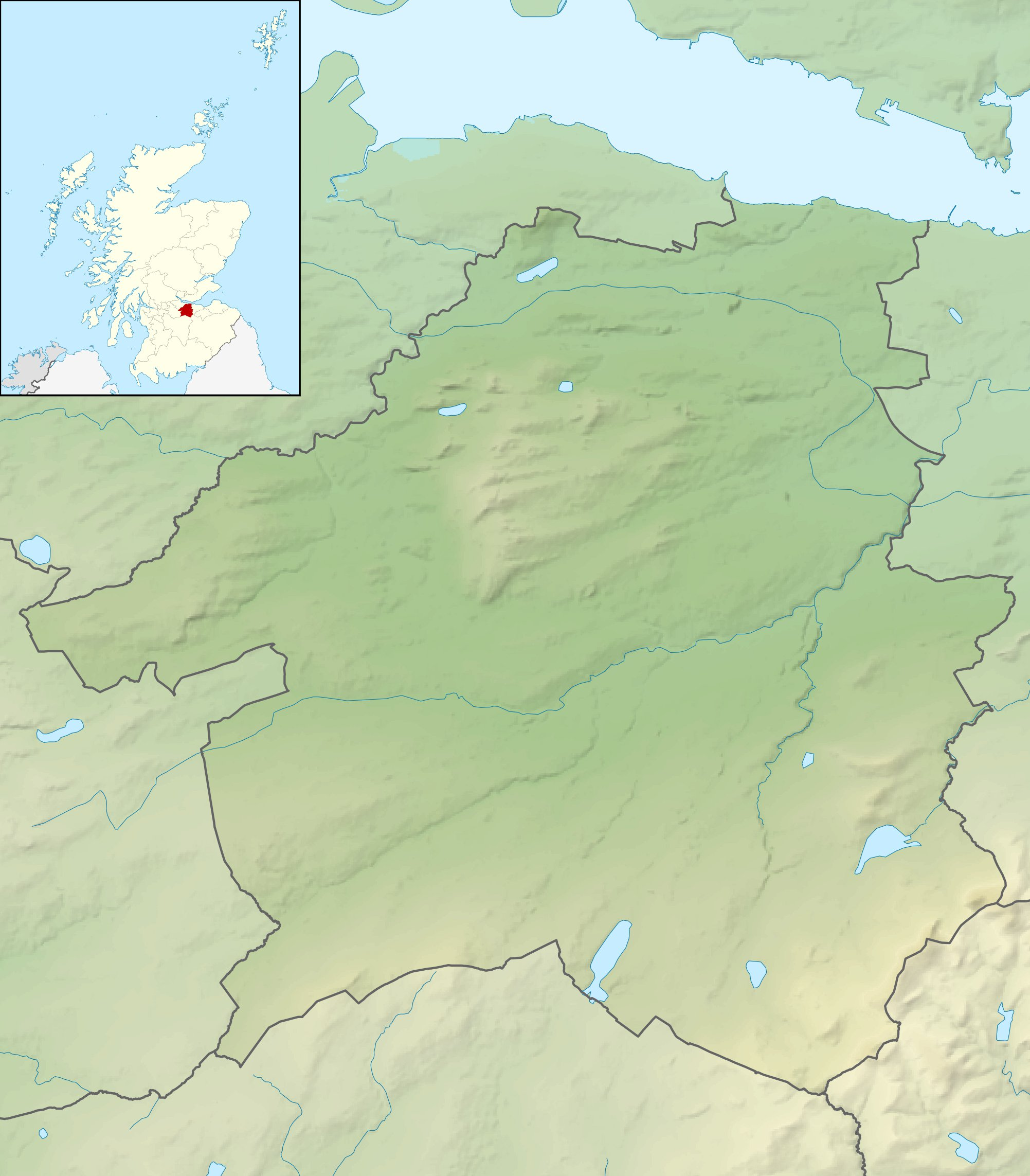
- Location within West Lothian
- Location: West Lothian, Scotland
- Coordinates: 55°50′0″N 3°26′40″W
- Type: reservoir
- Basin countries: Scotland

Harperrig Reservoir is a reservoir in West Lothian, Scotland, to the north of the Pentland Hills, four miles (6.4 km) south of Mid Calder. The Water of Leith flows through it, and nearby are Harlaw Reservoir and Threipmuir Reservoir. It has been proposed that the reservoir be designated as a local nature reserve to be managed by West Lothian Council.

== History and usage ==
Harperrig Reservoir was created in 1860 as part of a scheme to improve the supply of drinking water to Edinburgh, its function being as a compensation reservoir to guarantee a supply of water to the mills along the course of the Water of Leith. The dam was raised in height in 1890. In 2006 ownership of the reservoir was transferred from Scottish Water to the City of Edinburgh Council, the Council undertook modifications to the outflow in 2007–2008 as part of the Water of Leith Flood Prevention Scheme so that the reservoir could be used to store flood water and regulate the downstream flow of the Water of Leith.

== Description ==
Harperrig reservoir lies in the middle of a basin on the northwestern side of the Pentland Hills some 19 kilometres (12 miles) from south west of Edinburgh. The dam is 15.4 metres (51 ft) in height and is 120 metres (130 yd) in length. The reservoir holds 4,091,481 m^{3} (900,000,000 imp gal) of water and has a surface area of 94.4 hectares (233 acres).

== Historical sites within the catchment ==
The catchment area of Hareprrig reservoir includes the Scheduled Ancient Monuments which lie on East Cairn Hill and West Cairn Hill which date from the Bronze Age. The Old Schoolhouse at Causewayend is a category B Listed Building and the Royal Commission Inventory lists several other sites of historical interest. The ruin of Cairns Castle, dating from around 1440 and built by George Crichton, is situated on a hillock which projects into the reservoir.

== Fishing ==
At Harperrig Reservoir the fishing season runs from 15 March to 15 October and the fishing permits are administered and sold by Harperrig Fisheries Ltd, a company which represents the various owners of the fishing rights. Both boat and bank fishing are allowed and the reservoir is stocked with brown trout.

== Wilidlife interest ==
Harperrig reservoir is known to be used by Eurasian otter and an artificial holt has been provided. An island in the reservoir, called Gull island, provides a safe breeding habitat for gulls and wildfowl. Geese and ducks use the reservoir for wintering. It is one of only four sites in the Lothians where the stonefly leuctra leuctra has been recorded.

== See also ==
- Harlaw Reservoir
- Threipmuir Reservoir
- Reservoirs in the United Kingdom
