= Ptychostomum cyclophyllum =

Scientific classification
- Kingdom: Plantae
- Division: Bryophyta
- Class: Bryopsida
- Subclass: Bryidae
- Order: Bryales
- Family: Bryaceae
- Genus: Ptychostomum
- Subgenus: Ptychostomum subg. Ptychostomum
- Species: P. cyclophyllum

Binomial name
- Ptychostomum cyclophyllum (Schwägr.) J.R. Spence

Synonyms
- Bryum cyclophyllum (Schwägr.) Bruch & Schimp.

Species of moss

Ptychostomum cyclophyllum, round-leaved bryum, is a species of moss belonging to the family Bryaceae.

It is native to the Northern Hemisphere. It grows in wetlands and along streams.

In the UK, it has only been found to occur naturally in one location. In 2025, efforts were made to establish it in the muddy waters of two reservoirs in Scotland, at Loch Coulter and Threipmuir Reservoir.
