= Medlycott baronets =

Baronetcy of the United Kingdom

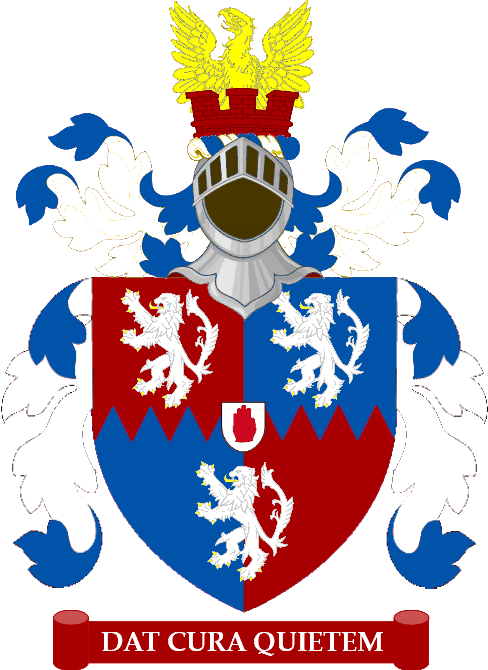
- Crest: Out of a mural crown Gules a demi-eagle wings elevated Or.
- Shield: Quarterly per fess indented Gules and Azure three lions rampant Argent.
- Motto: Dat Cura Quietem

The Medlycott Baronetcy, of Ven House in the County of Somerset, was a title in the Baronetage of the United Kingdom. It was created on 3 October 1808 for William Medlycott, Member of Parliament for Milborne Port from 1790 to 1791. The family descended from James Medlycott, of Ven House, who represented Milborne Port in the House of Commons between 1710 and 1722. His son Thomas Medlycott (Member of Parliament for Milborne Port from 1747 to 1763) died without surviving male issue in 1763 and left his estates to his maternal nephew Thomas Hutchings, who adopted the surname of Medlycott. His son was the first Baronet. The baronetcy became extinct with the death of the 9th Baronet in 2021.

== Medlycott baronets, of Ven House (1808) ==
- Sir William Coles Medlycott, 1st Baronet (1767–1835)
- Sir William Coles Medlycott, 2nd Baronet (1806–1882)
- Sir William Coles Paget Medlycott, 3rd Baronet (1831–1887)
- Sir Edward Bradford Medlycott, 4th Baronet (1832–1902)
- Sir Mervyn Bradford Medlycott, 5th Baronet (1837–1908)
- Sir Hubert James Medlycott, 6th Baronet (1841–1920)
- Sir Hubert Mervyn Medlycott, 7th Baronet (1874–1964)
- Sir (James) Christopher Medlycott, 8th Baronet (1907–1986)
- Sir Mervyn Tregonwell Medlycott, 9th Baronet (1947–2021), died without heir.

Baronetage of the United Kingdom
Preceded by Sitwell baronets	Medlycott baronets of Ven House; 3 October 1808	Succeeded by Perring baronets
