= Ralph Perring =

British businessman and Lord Mayor of London

Sir Ralph Edgar Perring, 1st Baronet (23 March 1905 – 28 June 1998) was a British businessman who was elected the 635th Lord Mayor of London.

He was born the youngest son of Colonel Sir John Perring and his wife Florence Higginson and was educated at University College School, London. During the Second World War he served as a lieutenant in the Royal Artillery until he was invalided out of the Army in 1940.

After the war, he was chairman of his own company, Perring Furnishings Ltd, from 1948 to 1981. He became a member of the Court of Common Council of the City of London for the Cripplegate Ward (1948–1951), Alderman representing Langbourn Ward (1951–1975) and a Lieutenant of the City of London. He was elected a Sheriff of the City of London for 1958–59 and Lord Mayor of London for 1962–63. He was knighted in the 1960 New Year Honours and created a baronet (of Frensham Manor in the County of Surrey) on 27 November 1963.

He was also Master of the Worshipful Company of Tin Plate Workers (1944–1945), Master of the Worshipful Company of Painter-Stainers (1977–1978) and Senior Past Master and founder member of the Worshipful Company of Furniture Makers.

He served as chairman of the BNEC Committee for Exports to Canada (1968–1970) and the Confederation Life Insurance Company of Canada (1969–1981).

As Lord Mayor of London in 1963, he invited the victorious West Indian cricket team to Mansion House and described their victory under the first black captain Frank Worrell as ‘a gale of change has blown through the hallowed halls of cricket.’

He died in June 1998. He had married Ethel Mary Johnson, daughter of Henry Theophilus Johnson, in 1928, and had four sons. He was succeeded by his eldest son, Sir John Raymond Perring, 2nd Baronet.

Coat of arms of Ralph Perring

Crest
Upon the trunk of a walnut tree fesswise with two branches sprouting therefrom Proper a sword erect Or.
Escutcheon
Argent on a pile barry wavy of eight Azure and of the field between two walnut trees eradicated Proper a lion rampant Gules.
Motto
Proud To Serve

Honorary titles
Preceded by Sir Frederick Hoare, Bt	Lord Mayor of London; 1962–1963	Succeeded by Sir James Harman
Baronetage of the United Kingdom
New creation	Baronet (of Frensham Manor); 1963–1998	Succeeded by Sir John Perring 2nd Bt. 1998-2020
