= Threipmuir Reservoir =

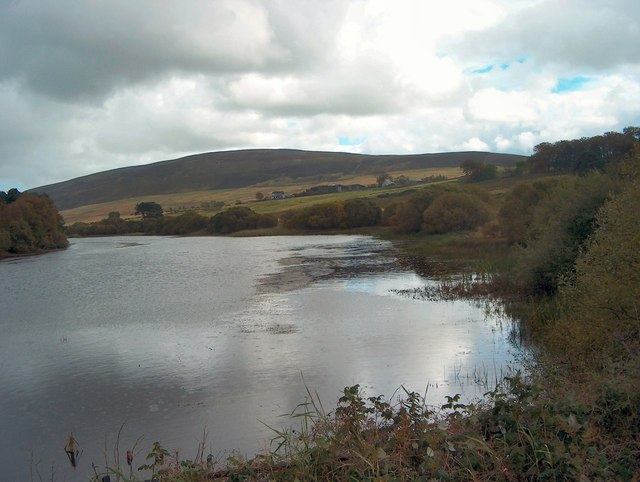
- Threipmuir Reservoir

- Location within Scotland
- Location: City of Edinburgh Council area, Scotland
- Coordinates: 55°51′43″N 3°19′10″W
- Type: reservoir
- Basin countries: United Kingdom

Threipmuir Reservoir is a reservoir in the City of Edinburgh Council area, Scotland, UK. It is situated to the south of Edinburgh at the base of the Pentland Hills, two miles south of Balerno.

Threipmuir reservoir is located behind an earth dam, constructed to a design by Scottish civil engineer James Jardine. The reservoir was formed between 1843 and 1848 as a compensation reservoir for the Water of Leith by the Edinburgh Water Company.

The reservoir spillway discharges at the eastern end, from where the discharge flows into Harlaw Reservoir.

Bavelaw Castle lies on its south side.

In 2025, a rare moss, Ptychostomum cyclophyllum (Round-leaved bryum), was transported to the loch to revive the species. The moss was found only in one other place in the UK until established at Loch Coulter and Threipmuir Reservoir.

== See also ==
- List of reservoirs and dams in the United Kingdom
- Harlaw Reservoir
- Harperrig Reservoir
