= Howietoun Fishery =

Scottish Victorian fish farm

Coordinates: 56°04′22″N 3°57′11″W

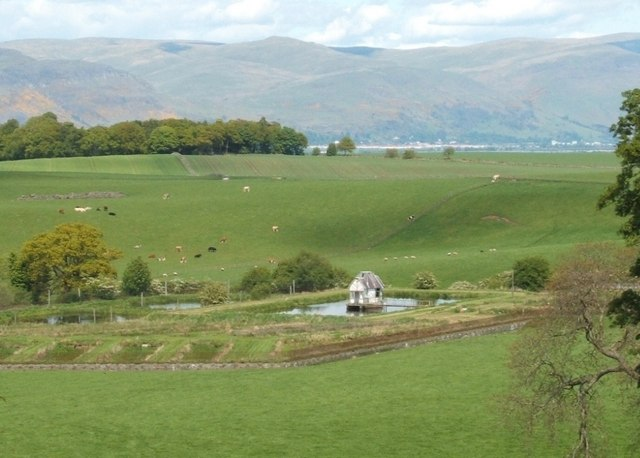
- Stirling, Scotland; FK7 9QH

Information
- Opened: 1873
- Founder: Sir James Maitland
- Authority: University of Stirling

Howietoun Fishery is a fish farm in Stirlingshire. It was created by Sir James Ramsay Gibson Maitland as a Victorian fishery that specialised in the study of trout and salmon farming and supplied live ova and fish on a worldwide scale.

== Sir James Maitland ==
Sir James Maitland, the 4th Baronet of Barnton, Sauchie and Bannockburn, along with his wife Fanny, moved into Craigend House on the Sauchie Estate in 1873. Upon his arrival he began experimenting with fish culture, he was interested in successfully farming fish the same way as animals, this experimentation was to help restock the rivers and lochs that he frequently fished at. Howietoun was a good position for Maitland to raise the fish due to its close proximity to Loch Coulter and the steady stream of fresh water that it supplied. There was no technology for the market which allowed for sustainability; however, by April 1875 Maitland had found a system that worked, and he had managed to produce 2,000 trout.

=== Method ===
Maitland's method for fish farming was a product of trial and error as there was no theory at the time, he kept eight-year-old fish as breeders and stripped the females of their eggs and collected the male milt in October. Maitland deduced that young fish spawn gave way to weak offspring, mature fish had to be used to gain strong offspring.

The eggs were transferred to hatching boxes which Maitland had designed after the eggs had hatched the fry were moved to rearing boxes and once they were large enough they moved once more into the plank ponds. The packing and transporting of live ova at the time was to over-pack in the hope that enough would survive the journey, Maitland revised how live ova and fish should be transported.

Maitland worked on the water flow through the ponds, building sluices, a dam and washing screens to control the amount of water and also what was flowing through the water into the ponds.

The diet of the fish was an important factor, and Maitland tried a few different options, sheep heart, rabbit liver and horse spleen-which when ingested by trouts causes blindness and nutritional cataracts, before sticking with a diet of horsemeat, shellfish and eggs.

Throughout his time at Howietoun, Maitland was meticulous at writing up reports on the fish, he collected and recorded as much information as he could about the fish and all his experiments were well documented. Maitland stuck to the classic scientific method, the one variable that was changed was monitored, the experiment was observed and recorded, then the results were recorded. It was this precise method of research in selective breeding and the optimum conditions for breeding, farming and transporting which made Maitland's work so revolutionary. It was this scientific approach to fish farming that gained Maitland the title of, father of scientific aquaculture.

=== Transportation ===
Maitland worked on a way to successfully transport Howietoun live ova all over the world, it took three attempts, but he came up with a solution to insulate the precious cargo so that the temperature did not fluctuate too high. Wellington, Dunedin and Otago all received successful shipments of the live ova in the specially made transport boxes that Maitland had designed, the shipment was of 200,000 salmon ova and 30,000 Loch Leven trout ova which arrived in 1885.

=== Awards ===
The work of Maitland at Howietoun fishery meant that he was awarded several diplomas in fish culture and two gold medals in 1883 and 1885, at the International Fisheries Exhibitions, Edinburgh.

== Howietoun Fishery ==
After Maitland died in 1897, the fishery passed on to his daughter Mary Steel-Maitland and her husband, Arthur Steel-Maitland. It was then amalgamated into the Northern Fisheries Company in 1914, with the Maitland family retaining 50% of the shares for the fishery and the other shares belonging to William McNicol and Peter Duncan Malloch. The fishery was sold by the Maitland family in 1967, and in 1979 it became a part of the Aquaculture Institute at the University of Stirling.

=== Buildings ===
The site is split into two with the hatchery being a few miles from the fishery. The site consists of a barn, two semi-detached cottages, a feed-store, hatching house, dispatching house and the summer-house (B-listed building).

== Legacy ==
The majority of brown trout restocking in lochs in Scotland is achieved through stock from Howietoun.
