= James Jardine (engineer) =

Scottish civil engineer, mathematician and geologist (1776–1858)

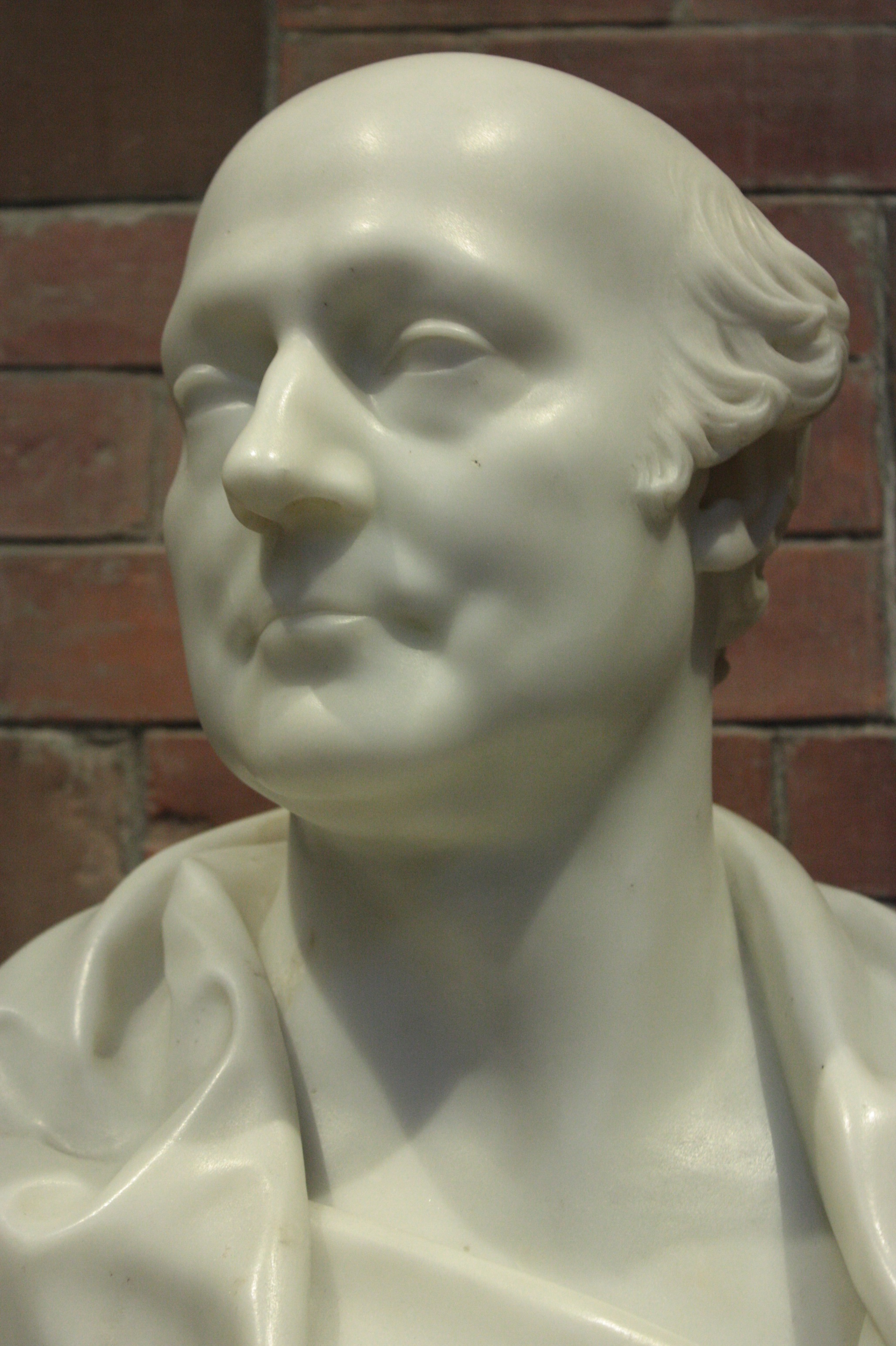
James Jardine by Patric Park 1842

James Jardine FRSE FSAScot (13 November 1776–20 June 1858) was a Scottish civil engineer, mathematician and geologist. He was the first person to determine mean sea level. He built tunnels and bridges, including for the Innocent Railway, and built reservoirs including Glencorse, Threipmuir, Harlaw for Edinburgh Water Company, and Cobbinshaw for the Union Canal.

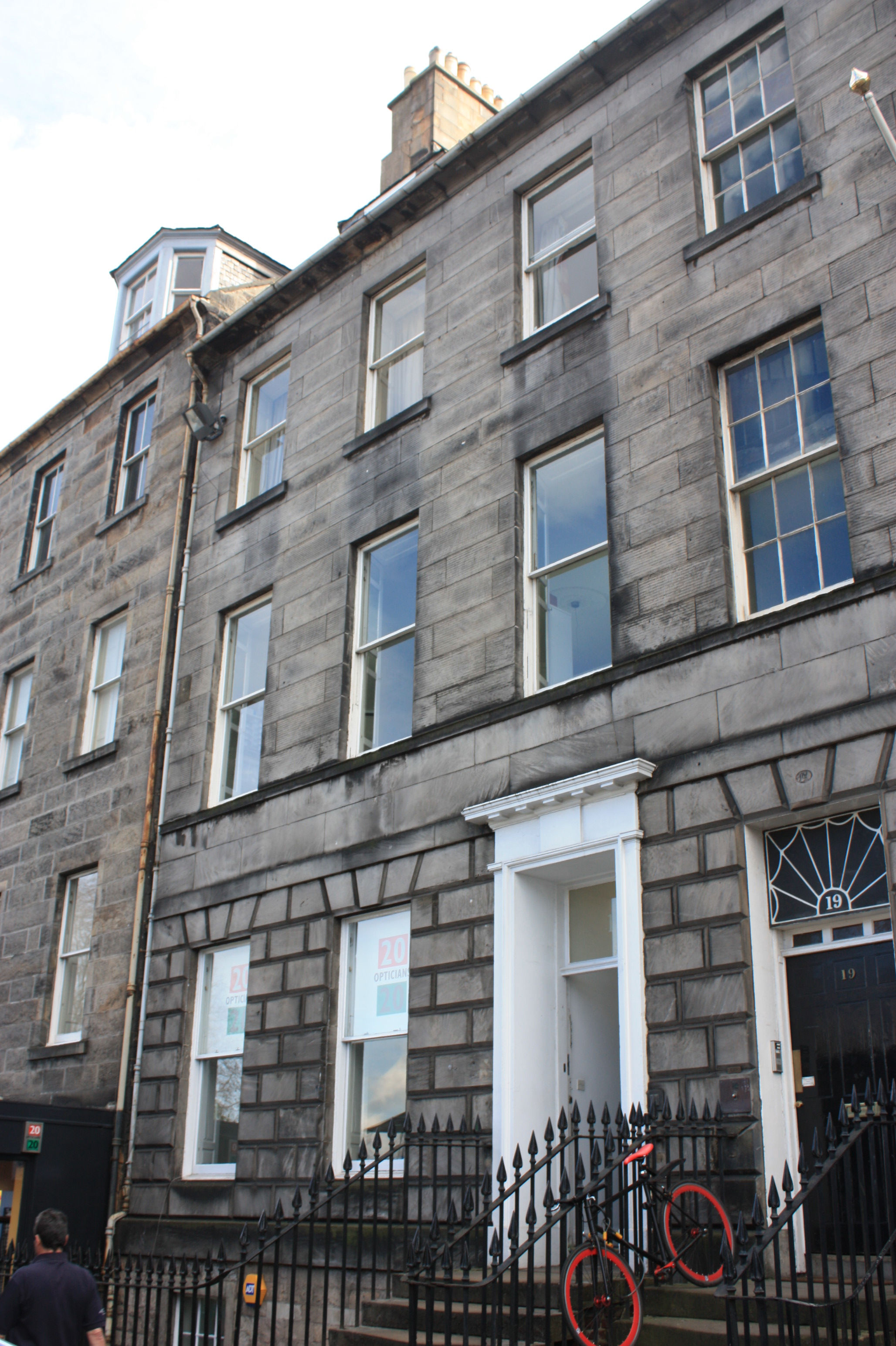
Jardine's home at 18 Queen Street, Edinburgh

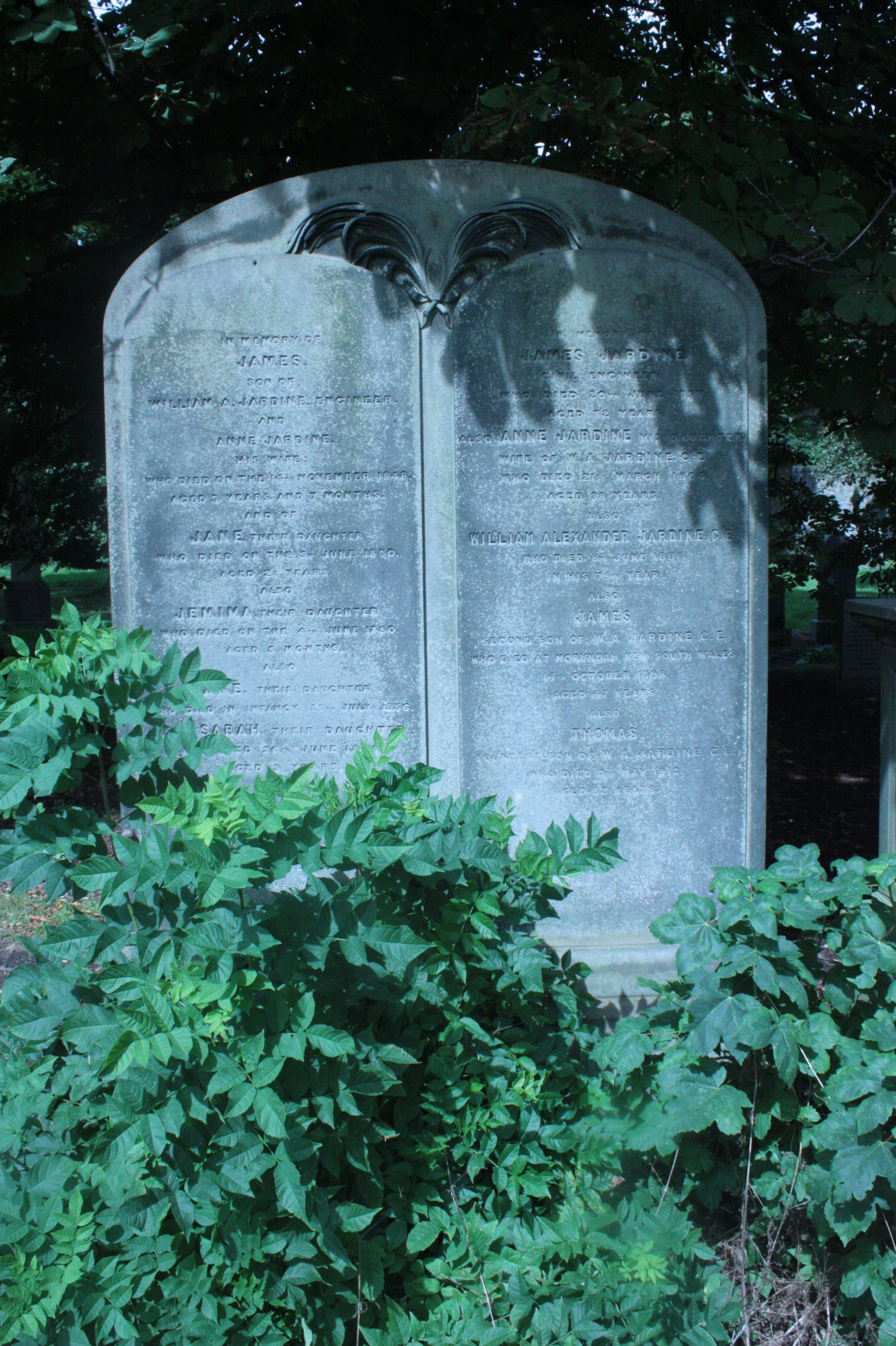
James Jardine's grave, Warriston Cemetery

== Life ==
Jardine was born in Applegarth, Dumfriesshire, on 30 November 1776, the son of a farmer. He was educated at Dumfries Academy and the University of Edinburgh. He studied mathematics under Prof John Playfair. He was a friend of Thomas Telford and they collaborated on several projects

Following survey work at the Firth of Tay, he was the first person in the world to calculate mean sea level. From 1796 to 1808 he lectured in mathematics at the University of Edinburgh.

From 1811 he began a series of harbour designs, beginning with Saltcoats. This was followed by Perth (1831), major extensions to Leith Docks (1835), and Eyemouth (1837).

In 1812 he was elected a Fellow of the Royal Society of Edinburgh. His proposers were John Playfair, John Leslie, Thomas Allan.

In 1813 he received the commission to drain the final waters of the Nor Loch to create Princes Street Gardens, and the final waters of the Burgh Loch to create The Meadows both in Edinburgh.

In 1819 he was appointed as the first engineer for the newly formed Edinburgh Water Company. He built an 8.5-mile (13.7 km) pipeline from the Crawley springs, completed in 1823, which provided Edinburgh's first reliable supply of drinking water from outside the city. With Thomas Telford acting as chief designer, he oversaw the construction of a new reservoir at Glencorse, chiefly designed to supply compensation water to enable mills on the River Esk to continue operating, after some of the water from the Glencorse Burn was extracted to boost water supplies for Edinburgh. He was also involved at the start of construction of two more reservoirs for the Edinburgh Water Company, at Threipmuir and Harlaw, but they were completed by James Leslie in 1847 and 1848, as he retired in 1846. Following his work on the Glencorse Reservoir, he was commissioned to undertake similar improvements in Perth, Dumfries and Glasgow. He re-engineered Loch Leven, reducing its water level by creating the Leven Cut, its first outlet. He did much of the engineering on the Union Canal, including creation of Cobbinshaw Reservoir as its water supply.

From 1826 he worked on the Edinburgh and Dalkeith Railway line, creating its St. Leonards branch, now commonly called the Innocent Railway. This includes a tunnel under the southern edge of Arthur's Seat plus the Glenesk Viaduct. He then embarked on other, more northerly railway projects: Ardrossan (1827), Threave (1825), Inveralmond (1827).

He worked on several projects with Thomas Telford, including provision of mathematical calculations to establish the required chain strength to hold the Menai Straits suspension bridge.

He was unsuccessful in his designs for Dean Bridge in Edinburgh and the City Observatory.

He retired at age 70 in 1846. He died at home, 18 Queen Street, a ground floor and basement, main-door flat at one of the most prestigious addresses in Edinburgh.

He is buried in Warriston Cemetery, in the upper section, on the main east west path near the old East Gate. He is buried with other family members including his nephew William Alexander Jardine (1811-1886) who was also a civil engineer. His gravestone is currently (2019) lying flat on its face having been toppled by a tree falling in strong winds in 2018.

He is known to have trained the railway engineer Alexander Adie. and the civil engineer James Anderson. He was a long time friend of the botanist Daniel Ellis who was also a Fellow of the Royal Society of Edinburgh and they attended Society meetings together.

== Bibliography ==
- Binnie, G M (1981). Early Victorian Water Engineers. Thomas Telford. ISBN 978-0-7277-0128-2.
- Waterston, C D; Shearer, A Macmillan (July 2006). Biographical Index of Former Fellows of the Royal Society of Edinburgh 1783–2002 (PDF). The Royal Society of Edinburgh. ISBN 0-902198-84-X. Archived from the original (PDF) on 24 January 2013.

=== References ===
- Gazetteer for Scotland: James Jardine
