= Ropner baronets of Thorp Perrow (1952) =

The Ropner baronetcy, of Thorp Perrow in the North Riding of the County of York, was created in the Baronetage of the United Kingdom on 31 January 1952 for Leonard Ropner, for many years Conservative Member of Parliament for Sedgefield and Barkston Ash. He was the son of William Ropner, third son of the 1st Baronet of the 1904 creation.

As of 2026, the title is dormant.

== Ropner baronets, of Thorp Perrow (1952) ==
- Sir Leonard Ropner, 1st Baronet (1895–1977)
- Sir John Bruce Woollacott Ropner, 2nd Baronet (1937–2016)
- Sir Henry John William Ropner, presumed 3rd Baronet (born 1981). Currently he has not claimed the title.
