= Pigott baronets =

Baronetcy in the Baronetage of the United Kingdom

- Escutcheon of the Pigott baronets of Knapton
- Creation date: 1764
- Status: vacant

The Pigott Baronetcy, of Knapton in the Queen's County, is a title in the Baronetage of the United Kingdom. It was created on 3 October 1808, for George Pigott. Pigott was the son of Thomas Pigott, a major general in the army and Member of Parliament.

== Pigott baronets, of Knapton (1808) ==
- Sir George Pigott, 1st Baronet (1766–1844)
- Sir Thomas Pigott, 2nd Baronet (1796–1847)
- Sir Charles Robert Pigott, 3rd Baronet (1835–1911)
- Sir Berkeley Pigott, 4th Baronet (1894–1982)
- Sir (Berkeley) Henry Sebastian Pigott, 5th Baronet (1925–2017)
- Sir David John Berkeley Pigott, 6th Baronet (born 1955). He succeeded his father in 2017, but the Official Roll marks the title vacant.

The heir presumptive is the current Baronet's brother Antony Charles Philip Pigott (born 1960).

== See also ==
- Pigot baronets

== Notes ==
Baronetage of the United Kingdom
Preceded by Perring baronets	Pigott baronets of Knapton; 3 October 1808	Succeeded by Harland baronets
