= Maitland baronets of Pitrichies (1672) =

The Maitland baronetcy, of Pitrichies, parish of Udny, in the County of Aberdeen, was created in the Baronetage of Nova Scotia on 12 March 1672 for Richard Maitland, a Senator of the College of Justice. The title became either extinct or dormant on the death of the 4th Baronet c. 1704.

== Maitland baronets, of Pitrichies (1672) ==
- Sir Richard Maitland, 1st Baronet (died 1677)
- Sir Richard Maitland, 2nd Baronet (died 1679)
- Sir Charles Maitland, 3rd Baronet (died 1700)
- Sir Charles Maitland, 4th Baronet (died c. 1704)
