= James Ramsay-Gibson-Maitland =

Scottish aquaculturist (1848–1897)

Sir James Ramsay-Gibson-Maitland, 4th Baronet
- Born: 29 March 1848
- Died: 9 November 1897 (aged 49)
- Education: University of St Andrews Royal Military College, Sandhurst
- Known for: Father of Scientific Aquaculture
- Notable work: The History of Howietoun Part I
- Spouse: Fanny Lucy Fowke Ramsay-Gibson-Maitland
- Children: 2 daughters Mary Ramsay-Gibson-Maitland Sybile Ramsay-Gibson-Maitland
- Parents: Sir Alexander Charles Ramsay-Gibson-Maitland, 3rd Baronet (father); Thomasina Agnes Hunt (mother)
- Relatives: Brother of William Forbes Ramsay-Gibson-Maitland Keith Ramsay-Gibson-Maitland and three sisters (names unknown)
- Awards: Several diplomas in fish culture A gold medal in 1883 and 1885 from the International Fisheries Exhibition, Edinburgh

Sir James Ramsay-Gibson-Maitland, 4th Baronet (29 March 1848 – 9 November 1897) was a Scottish aquaculturist who dedicated his life to experimenting on the practices of husbandry in fish. He gained recognition for his work by being awarded several diplomas.

== Early life ==
James Maitland was born on 29 March 1848. His father was Sir Alexander Ramsay-Gibson-Maitland, 3rd Baronet of Clifton Hall, and his mother was Thomasina, née Hunt, and he also had two brothers, William and Keith. The Maitland baronets of Clifton were descendants of the Earls of Lauderdale, and in 1866 the 3rd Baronet had assumed the surname of Ramsay before that of Gibson-Maitland when he succeeded to the estates of Ramsay of Barnton.

James was educated at St Andrews University before leaving to attend the Royal Military College at Sandhurst; however, after joining the army and becoming a Captain in the Highland Borderers, he left after one year. He married Fanny White, daughter of Sir Thomas Woollaston White, 2nd Baronet of Tuxford and Wallingwells in 1869, near Nottingham, and they moved to Craigend in 1873. James and Fanny had two daughters.

== Howietoun Fishery ==
Howietoun Fishery was established in 1873, Maitland had previously been experimenting in another site; however, the site was prone to flooding which meant that Maitland and a team of men had to try and recapture the escaped Swiss trout. Howietoun was an ideal spot as it had a water supply from Lake Coulter and a steady supply of spring water also.

Maitland believed that fish could be raised in a similar way as farm animals, in that animal husbandry could also be successful when applied to a fishery. Maitland's approach to experimentation was a scientific one; he would only change one variable during an experiment and then would hypothesise how the outcome had happened. This meant that he was able to work out that breeding young stock of fish gave a result of weak offspring; instead, he realised older stock must be used to gain strong offspring. He worked out that the female fish must be stripped of their eggs and male milt collected in October; he then worked on hatching boxes for the live ova. After the fry hatched, then they were transferred to rearing boxes before being transferred to plank ponds. Maitland was meticulous in writing up his experiments; this means that every change that he made in the diet, transport and selective breeding of the fish was documented. There are even pictures with measurements of the instruments Maitland was inventing to make rearing fish easier.

Maitland also experimented on the diet of the trout and salmon at the fishery; he worked out that horse spleen when ingested by trout caused blindness and nutritional cataracts. He worked on several options before concluding that the best option for feeding trout and salmon was horsemeat, shellfish and eggs.

One of his most important experiments was finding ways to transport large quantities of live ova, at the time live ova were sent in crammed packages and when they arrived most did not survive, Maitland took three attempts to work out how to insulate the cargo to stop fluctuations in temperature. Successful shipments were then sent to Wellington, Dunedin and Otago in the specially designed shipment boxes that Maitland had designed himself.

=== Awards ===
The work of Maitland at Howietoun fishery meant that he was awarded several diplomas in fish culture and two gold medals in 1883 and 1885, at the International Fisheries Exhibitions, Edinburgh.

== Death and legacy ==
Maitland died on 9 November 1897, his daughter Mary Steel-Maitland and her husband Arthur Steel-Maitland took over the running of Howietoun. Howietoun Fishery was then amalgamated into the Northern Fisheries Company in 1914 before the Maitland family sold it in 1969. It became a part of the University of Stirling Aquaculture Institute in 1979.

The majority of brown trout re-stocking in Scotland is achieved through the stock of Howietoun Fishery.

Baronetage of the United Kingdom
Preceded by Alexander Ramsay-Gibson-Maitland	Baronet (of Clifton); 1876–1897	Succeeded by John Maitland
