= Perring baronets of Frensham Manor (1963) =

The Perring baronetcy, of Frensham Manor in the County of Surrey, was created in the Baronetage of the United Kingdom on 27 November 1963 for the businessman and public servant Ralph Perring. He was Lord Mayor of London from 1962 to 1963. As of 2026 the title is held by his grandson, the 3rd Baronet.

== Perring baronets, of Frensham Manor (1963) ==
- Sir Ralph Edgar Perring, 1st Baronet (1905–1998)
- Sir John Raymond Perring, 2nd Baronet (1931–2020) m. Ella Pelham (died 2019)
- Sir John Simon Pelham Perring, 3rd Baronet (born 1962). His name does not appear on the Official Roll.

The heir presumptive is the current baronet's younger brother, Mark Ralph Pelham Perring (born 1965).

Coat of arms of Perring baronets of Frensham Manor

Crest
Upon the trunk of a walnut tree fesswise with two branches sprouting therefrom Proper a sword erect Or.
Escutcheon
Argent on a pile barry wavy of eight Azure and of the field between two walnut trees eradicated Proper a lion rampant Gules.
Motto
Proud to serve
