= Johnson baronets of Bath (1818) =

The Johnson baronetcy, of Bath, Somerset was created in the Baronetage of the United Kingdom on 1 December 1818 for Henry Johnson, a colonel in the 5th Regiment of Foot and Governor of Ross Castle. He was the younger brother of Sir John Johnson-Walsh, 1st Baronet, of Ballykilcavan.

As of 2026, the baronetcy is dormant.

== Johnson baronets of Bath ==
- Sir Henry Johnson, 1st Baronet (1748–1835)
- Sir Henry Allen Johnson, 2nd Baronet (1785–1860). Fought with distinction in the Peninsular War. His sixth son, Sir Charles Cooper Johnson, was a general in the British Army. Charles Cooper's son, Eliot Philipse Johnson, was a brigadier-general in the British Army, and the father of the presumed 7th Baronet.
- Sir Henry Franks Frederic Johnson, 3rd Baronet (1819–1883)
- Brigadier-General Sir Henry Allen William Johnson, 4th Baronet (1855–1944), King's Own Yorkshire Light Infantry
- Sir Henry Allen Beaumont Johnson, 5th Baronet (1887–1965)
- Sir Victor Philipse Hill Johnson, 6th Baronet (1905–1986)
- Robin Eliot Johnson, presumed 7th Baronet (1929–1989)
- Patrick Eliot Johnson, presumed 8th Baronet (born 1955). His name is not on the Official Roll of the Baronetage, as of 2026.

The presumptive heir apparent to the baronetcy is Richard Eliot Johnson (born 1983), eldest son of the presumed 8th Baronet.

== Notes ==
Baronetage of the United Kingdom
Preceded by Maitland baronets	Johnson baronets of Bath; 1 December 1818	Succeeded by Farrington baronets
