= Harlaw Reservoir =

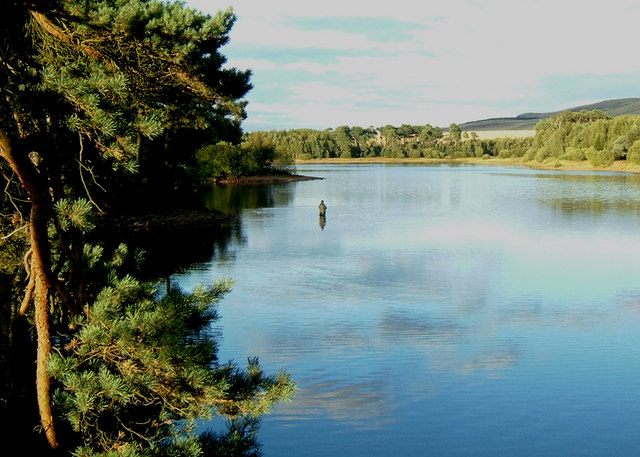

- Location within Scotland
- Location: City of Edinburgh Council area, Scotland
- Coordinates: 55°52′10″N 3°18′40″W
- Type: reservoir
- Basin countries: United Kingdom

Harlaw Reservoir is a small reservoir in the City of Edinburgh Council area, Scotland, UK, situated at the base of the Pentland Hills near Currie and Balerno.

It is located behind an earth gravity dam, constructed between 1843 and 1848 to the east and downstream of Threipmuir Reservoir, to a design by civil engineer James Jardine. The work was commissioned by the Edinburgh Water Company as a compensation reservoir for the Water of Leith.

Harlaw Reservoir is walkable around its perimeter. The walking path passes through the Harlaw wildlife garden, which uses hedgelaying to ease maintenance. West Kip can be seen from the location of Harlaw Reservoir.

== See also ==
- List of reservoirs and dams in the United Kingdom
