= Goulding baronets of Millicent and Roebuck Hill (1904) =

Escutcheon of the Goulding baronets of Millicent and Roebuck Hill

The Goulding baronetcy, of Millicent in Clane in the County of Kildare, and Roebuck Hill in Dundrum in the County of Dublin, is a title in the Baronetage of the United Kingdom. It was created on 22 August 1904 for the businessman William Goulding, a director of several railway companies in Ireland, and son of William Goulding (1817–1884), Conservative MP for Cork City. The family surname is pronounced "Goolding".

Goulding accompanied the Church of Ireland Archbishop of Dublin John Gregg and Bishop of Cashel Robert Miller "to see Michael Collins in May 1922, following the murders of thirteen Protestants in the Bandon valley, to ask whether the Protestant minority should stay on. Collins 'assured them that the government would maintain civil and religious liberty'."

The 3rd Baronet was an industrialist and cricketer, and the husband of Valerie Goulding. The baronetcy is now dormant.

== Goulding baronets, of Millicent and Roebuck Hill (1904) ==
- Sir William Joshua Goulding, 1st Baronet (1856–1925)
- Sir William Lingard Amphlett Goulding, 2nd Baronet (1883–1935)
- Sir (William) Basil Goulding, 3rd Baronet (1909–1982)
- (William) Lingard Walter Goulding, presumed 4th Baronet (born 1940), has not proved his claim to the titlee.

The heir presumptive is the present holder's brother Timothy Adam Goulding (born 1945).

== Notes ==
Baronetage of the United Kingdom
Preceded by Ropner baronets	Goulding baronets of Millicent and Roebuck Hill; 22 August 1904	Succeeded by Harmsworth baronets
