= Perring baronets of Membland (1808) =

Escutcheon of the Perring baronets of Membland

The Perring Baronetcy, of Membland in the County of Devon, was created in the Baronetage of the United Kingdom on 3 October 1808 for the Lord Mayor of London John Perring. The title became extinct on the death of the fourth Baronet in 1920.

== Perring baronets, of Membland (1808) ==
- Sir John Perring, 1st Baronet (1765–1831)
- Sir John Perring, 2nd Baronet (1794–1843)
- Sir Philip Perring, 3rd Baronet (1797–1866)
- Sir Philip Perring, 4th Baronet (1828–1920)

== Notes ==
Baronetage of the United Kingdom
Preceded by Medlycott baronets	Perring baronets of Membland; 3 October 1808	Succeeded by Pigott baronets
