= Ropner baronets of Preston Hall and Skutterskelfe Hall (1904) =

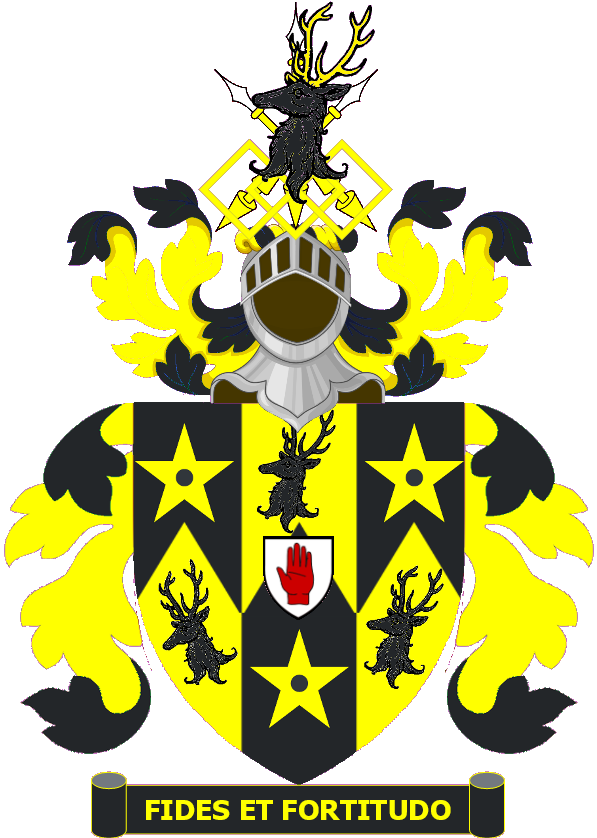
Arms of Ropner baronets of Preston Hall and Skutterskelfe Hall

The Ropner baronetcy, of Preston Hall, in the parish of Stockton-on-Tees of the County Palatine of Durham, and of Skutterskelfe Hall, in the parish of Hutton Rudby, County of York, was created in the Baronetage of the United Kingdom on 20 August 1904 for Robert Ropner. He was a steamship owner and steamship builder and also represented Stockton-on-Tees in the House of Commons as a Conservative.

== Ropner baronets, of Preston Hall and Skutterskelfe Hall (1904) ==
- Sir (Emil Hugo Oscar) Robert Ropner, 1st Baronet (1838–1924)
- Sir John Henry Ropner, 2nd Baronet (1860–1936)
- Sir Emil Hugo Oscar Robert Ropner, 3rd Baronet (1893–1962)
- Sir Robert Douglas Ropner, 4th Baronet (1921–2004)
- Sir Robert Clinton Ropner, 5th Baronet (born 1949)

The heir apparent is the present holder's son Christopher Guy Ropner (born 1979).

== Notes ==
Baronetage of the United Kingdom
Preceded by Wills baronets	Ropner baronets of Preston Hall and Skutterskelfe Hall; 20 August 1904	Succeeded by Goulding baronets
