= Maitland baronets =

There have been three baronetcies created for persons with the surname Maitland, two in the Baronetage of Nova Scotia and one in the Baronetage of the United Kingdom. Two of the creations are extant as of 2026.

- Maitland baronets of Pitrichies (1672)
- Maitland baronets of Ravelrig (1680): see Earl of Lauderdale
- Maitland baronets of Clifton (1818), later Gibson-Maitland, Ramsay-Gibson-Maitland, then again Maitland

== See also ==
- Ramsay-Steel-Maitland baronets
