= Duckworth (surname) =

- Pronunciation: UK: /ˈdʌkwəθ/ US: /ˈdʌkwɜːrθ/
- Language: English

Origin
- Origin: from Duckworth, near Bury, Lancashire

Duckworth is a surname. Notable people with the surname include:

== Actual persons ==
- Angela Duckworth (born 1970), American psychologist, MacArthur fellow
- Anthony Duckworth-Chad (born 1942), English businessman and senior county officer
- Arthur Duckworth (1901–1986), British politician
- Ben Duckworth (born 1974), Australian rugby league footballer
- Billy Duckworth (born 1959), Australian rules footballer
- Bobby Duckworth (born 1958), American football player
- Brandon Duckworth (born 1976), American baseball player
- Carl W. Duckworth (1955–2018), American politician
- Christopher Duckworth (1933–2014), South African cricketer
- Dick Duckworth (footballer born 1882), English footballer
- Dick Duckworth (footballer, born 1906), English footballer
- Don Duckworth, former NASCAR Cup Series driver
- Sir Dyce Duckworth (1840–1928), English physician and baronet
- E. H. Duckworth (1894 -1972), Founding editor of Nigeria magazine
- Eleanor Duckworth (born 1935), Canadian thinker and educator
- Frank Duckworth (1939–2024), English cricket statistician
- George Duckworth (1901–1966), English cricketer
- George Eckel Duckworth (1903–1972), American classicist
- George Herbert Duckworth (1868–1934), English public servant
- Gerald Duckworth (1870–1937), English publisher
- Henry Duckworth (1915–2008), Canadian physicist and university administrator
- James Duckworth (disambiguation), multiple people
- John Duckworth (physicist) (1916–2015), British physicist
- Admiral Sir John Thomas Duckworth, British naval officer
- Col. Joseph Duckworth (1903–1964), American aviator
- Justin Duckworth, Anglican bishop of Wellington, New Zealand
- Keith Duckworth (1933–2005), English engineer
- Kendrick Lamar Duckworth (born 1987), American rapper and songwriter
- Kevin Duckworth (1964–2008), U.S. basketball player
- Landon Duckworth (born 2007), American football player
- Michael Duckworth (born 1992), English footballer
- Muriel Duckworth (1908–2009), Canadian feminist
- Canon Noel Duckworth (1912–1980), Canon of Accra
- Reverend Robinson Duckworth, contemporary of Lewis Carroll and model for the duck in Alice's Adventures in Wonderland
- Santiago J. Duckworth, was in the California State Assembly and a real estate developer
- Shannon Rogers Duckworth, American bishop
- Susan Duckworth, American politician
- Tammy Duckworth (born 1968), American politician serving as the junior Senator from the state of Illinois
- Thomas Duckworth (disambiguation), multiple people
- William Duckworth (disambiguation), multiple people
- Willie Duckworth, U.S. soldier and composer of The Duckworth Chant (or Sound Off!)

== Fictional persons ==
- Dom Duckworth, fictional character in the children's TV show Horrible Histories
- Jack Duckworth, fictional character in the soap opera Coronation Street
- Vera Duckworth, fictional character in the soap opera Coronation Street; wife of Jack
- Clifford Duckworth, fictional character from the soap opera Coronation Street; brother of Jack
- Elsie Duckworth, fictional character from the soap opera Coronation Street; wife of Clifford
- Terry Duckworth, fictional character in the soap opera Coronation Street; son of Jack and Vera
- Lisa Duckworth, fictional character in the soap opera Coronation Street; wife of Terry
- Tommy Duckworth, fictional character in the soap opera Coronation Street; son of Terry and Lisa
- Frank Duckworth, fictional character in the TV show Black-ish
- Donna Duckworth, fictional character in the TV show Black-ish; wife of Frank
- Sharon Duckworth, fictional character in the TV show Black-ish; daughter of Frank and Donna
- Carl Duckworth, fictional character in the Kendrick Lamar (see above) song FEAR.; cousin of Lamar
- Mary Duckworth/Duxbury, fictional character in The Cat Who... mystery novels
