= Duckworth =

Duckworth may refer to:

- Duckworth (surname), people with the surname Duckworth
- Duckworth (DuckTales), fictional butler from the television series DuckTales
- Duckworth Books, a British publishing house
- HMS Duckworth (K351), a frigate
- Duckworth, West Virginia, an unincorporated community, United States
- an earlier name of Bluff, Queensland, Australia
- "Duckworth" (song) (stylized "DUCKWORTH."), a 2017 song by Kendrick Lamar (named after his surname)
- Duckworth, a 2011 Adult Swim pilot

== See also ==
- Duckworth-Lewis method, a statistical method for match calculations in cricket
- The Duckworth Lewis Method, an Irish pop group named after the cricketing term
- Duckwrth, American rapper and singer
