= John Duckworth =

John Duckworth may refer to:

== People ==
- Sir John Duckworth, 1st Baronet (1748–1817), British naval officer of the French Revolutionary and Napoleonic Wars
- Sir John Duckworth, 2nd Baronet (1809–1887), British Conservative politician
- John Duckworth (footballer) (born 1949), Australian rules footballer and Magarey Medallist
- John Duckworth (physicist) (1916–2015), British physicist
- John Duckworth (politician) (1863–1946), Member of Parliament for Blackburn

== Characters ==
- Jack Duckworth, character in the British soap opera Coronation Street, played by William Tarmey

== See also ==
- Duckworth (surname)
