= Edward Duckworth (disambiguation) =

Edward Duckworth was a footballer.

Edward Duckworth may also refer to:

- Sir Edward Dyce Duckworth, 2nd Baronet (1875–1945), of the Duckworth baronets
- Sir Edward Richard Dyce Duckworth, 4th Baronet (1943–2005), of the Duckworth baronets

== See also ==
- Duckworth (surname)
