= Savory baronets of The Woodlands (1890) =

Escutcheon of the Savory baronets of The Woodlands

The Savory baronetcy, of The Woodlands, Hollybush Hill, Stoke Poges, Buckinghamshire, was created in the Baronetage of the United Kingdom on 24 March 1890 for the surgeon William Scovell Savory. The 2nd Baronet, Sir Borradaile Savory, was rector of St Bartholomew-the-Great from 1887 to 1906; and the 3rd Baronet, Sir William Borradaile Savory, High Sheriff of Buckinghamshire for 1923.

== Savory baronets, of The Woodlands, Bucks (1890) ==
- Sir William Scovell Savory, 1st Baronet (1826–1895)
- The Rev. Sir Borradaile Savory, 2nd Baronet (1855–1906)
- Sir William Borradaile Savory, 3rd Baronet (1882–1961). The baronetcy was extinct on his death.

== Notes ==
Baronetage of the United Kingdom
Preceded by Sassoon baronets	Savory baronets of The Woodlands; 24 March 1890	Succeeded by Fowler baronets

}
