= Stoke Place =

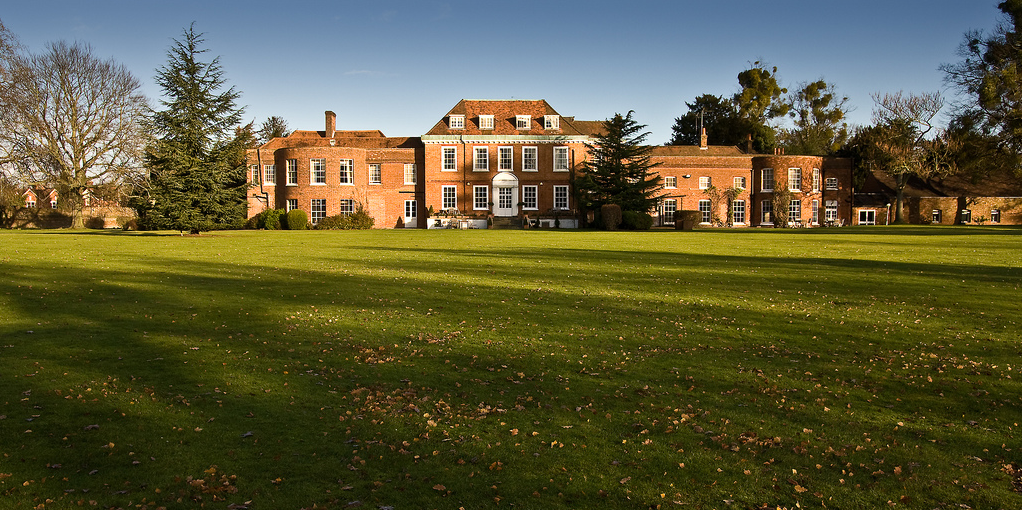

- Location within Buckinghamshire

General information
- Location: Stoke Poges
- Coordinates: 51.53083°N 0.58501°W
- Construction started: 1690

Design and construction
- Architect: Patrick Lamb

Website
- https://www.stokeplace.co.uk/

Stoke Place is a country house in Stoke Poges in Buckinghamshire.

== Patrick Lamb ==
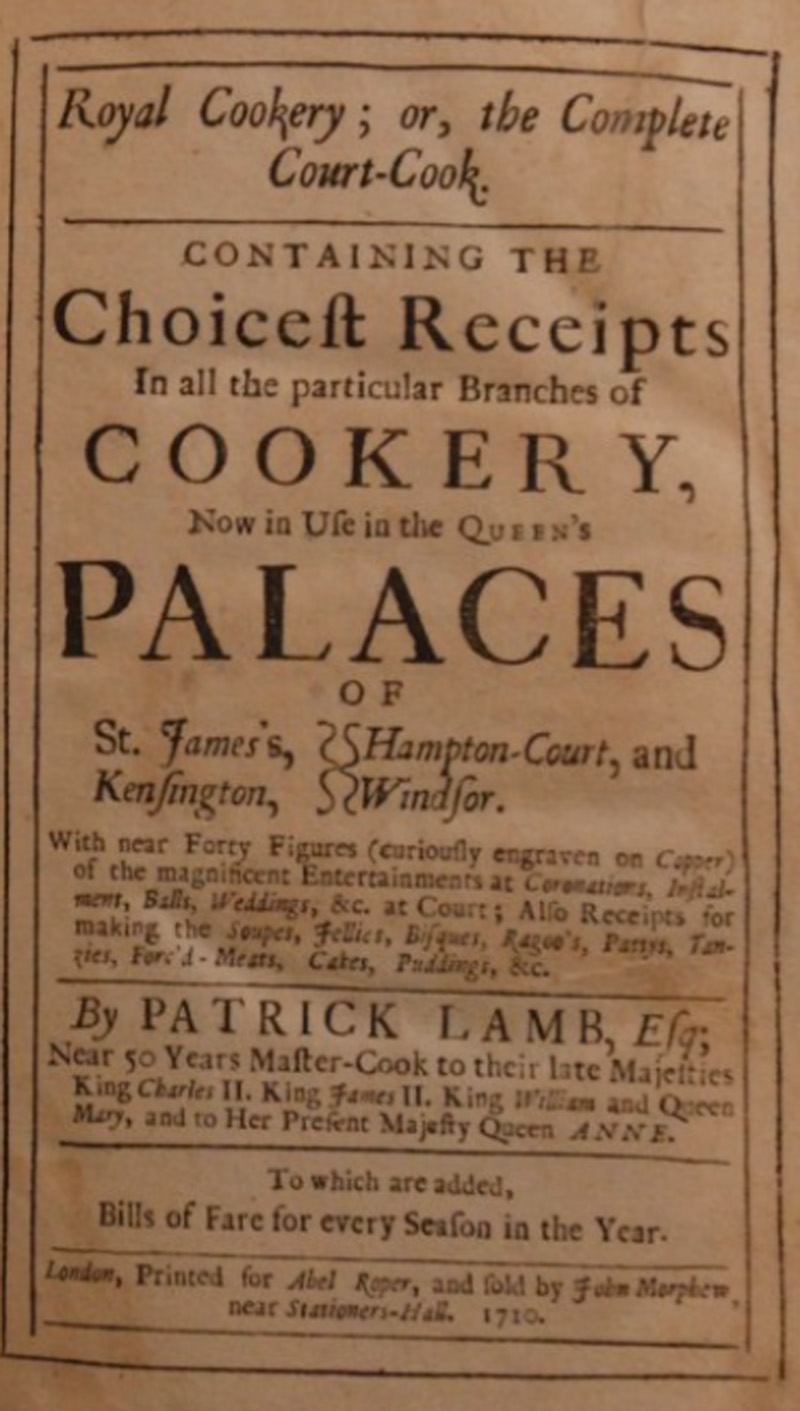
Patrick Lamb's cookbook

Patrick Lamb built Stoke Place in 1690. For about 50 years he was Master Cook to several monarchs, including King Charles II, King James II, King William, Queen Mary and Queen Anne.

He was born in 1650 in the parish of St Martin-in-the-Fields in London. His father was Patrick Lamb (1613–1683), the sole merchant of wine, spirits and tobacco in the Whitehall area. His mother was Martha Russell.

Lamb started his career at an early age as pastry assistant and rose rapidly in the kitchen hierarchy. He became very prosperous and wrote a well-known, still extant book, Royal Cookery, whose front page is shown. In 1685 he prepared King James II's Coronation Feast, which was described in detail by Francis Sandiford in his book. The King was so pleased with his work that he gave him a large number of gold coins.

After Patrick had built Stoke Place in 1690, he continued to work as Master Cook for Queen Anne. When he died in 1708, the property appears to have been inherited by his son, William Lamb. In 1764 Field Marshal Sir George Howard bought the estate, which became his family's home for 200 years.

== The Howard family ==
Field Marshal Sir George Howard lived at Stoke Place from 1764 until 1796. He was born in 1718 into a military family. His father was Lieutenant General Thomas Howard. He had a very distinguished military career and in 1763 was appointed Colonel of the 7th (the Queens Own) Regiment of Dragoons. The following year he bought Stoke Place. Howard commissioned Stiff Leadbetter to add two wings to the house over the next few years. Capability Brown the famous landscape architect, recorded in his account book that from 1765 until 1767 he constructed a lake with islands for which he charged 800 pounds.

In 1747 he married Lady Lucy Wentworth and had one daughter Ann Howard. Unfortunately his wife died in 1771 and he married Elizabeth Beckford. While he lived at Stoke Place the King and Queen made numerous visits to the house which were reported in the newspapers of that time. In 1780 his daughter Ann married General Richard Vyse and the couple had one daughter Georgiana and one son Richard William Howard Vyse. Sadly Ann died while giving birth to this child in 1784. Subsequent generations adopted the surname Howard-Vyse. When Sir George Howard died in 1796 he left Stoke Place to this grandson. Richard William Howard Vyse (1784-1853) was only 12 when his grandfather died so his inheritance was placed in trust until he came of age. In 1812 he took the additional name of Howard so that his and his heirs from then on had the surname of Howard-Vyse. When he died in 1853 Richard Henry Howard-Vyse (1813-1872) inherited the property. After his death Howard Henry Howard-Vyse (1858-1927) his eldest son became the owner. Following Howard Henry Howard-Vyse's death in 1927, his eldest son Richard Granville Hylton Howard-Vyse inherited the house.

Richard Granville Hylton Howard-Vyse was born in 1883. He was educated at Eton and gained a post in the Royal Horse Guards in 1902. He was rapidly promoted and in the First World War he led several important battles. After the war he was awarded the D.S.O and the C.M.G.

Richard and his wife lived at Stoke Place until his death in 1962. After this it was sold to South Bucks District Council. It operated as a hotel and conference centre, under lease from the Council and under the management of Novtej and Sarina Dhillon until January 2016 when it was acquired by Cairn Hotel Group.

== Gallery ==
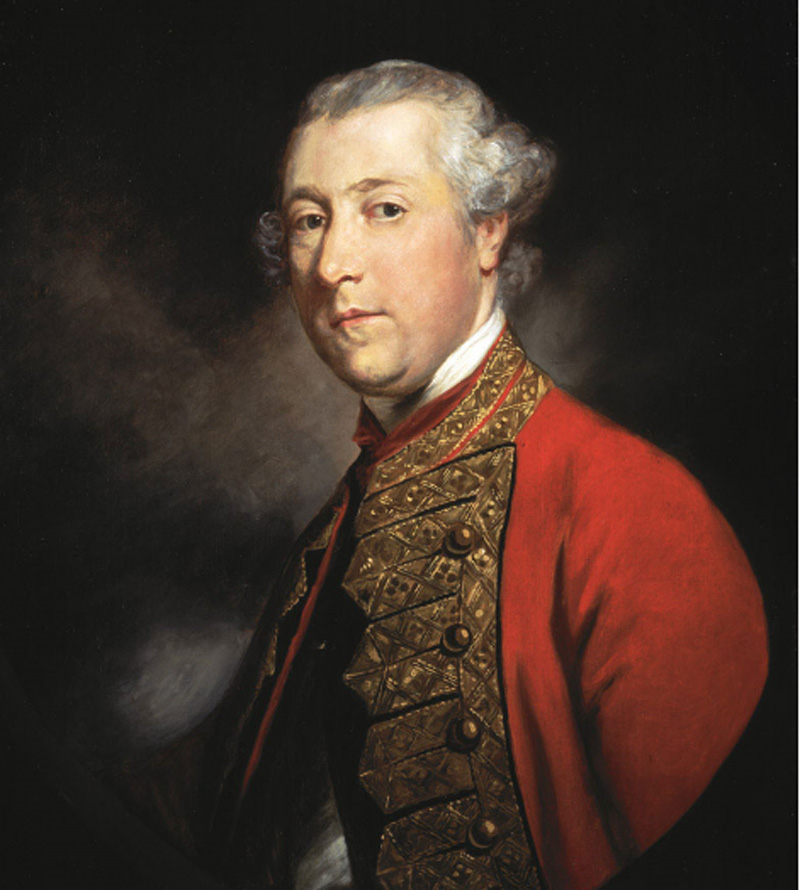
Field Marshal Sir George Howard

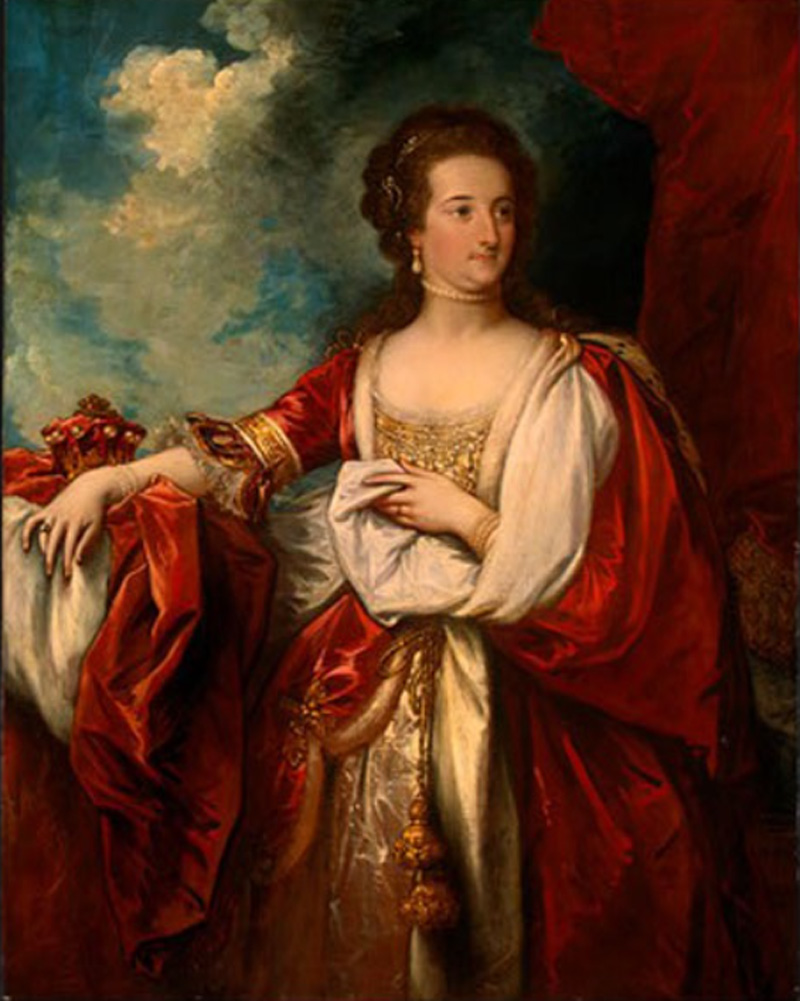
Lady Elizabeth Howard née Beckford, wife of Sir George Howard

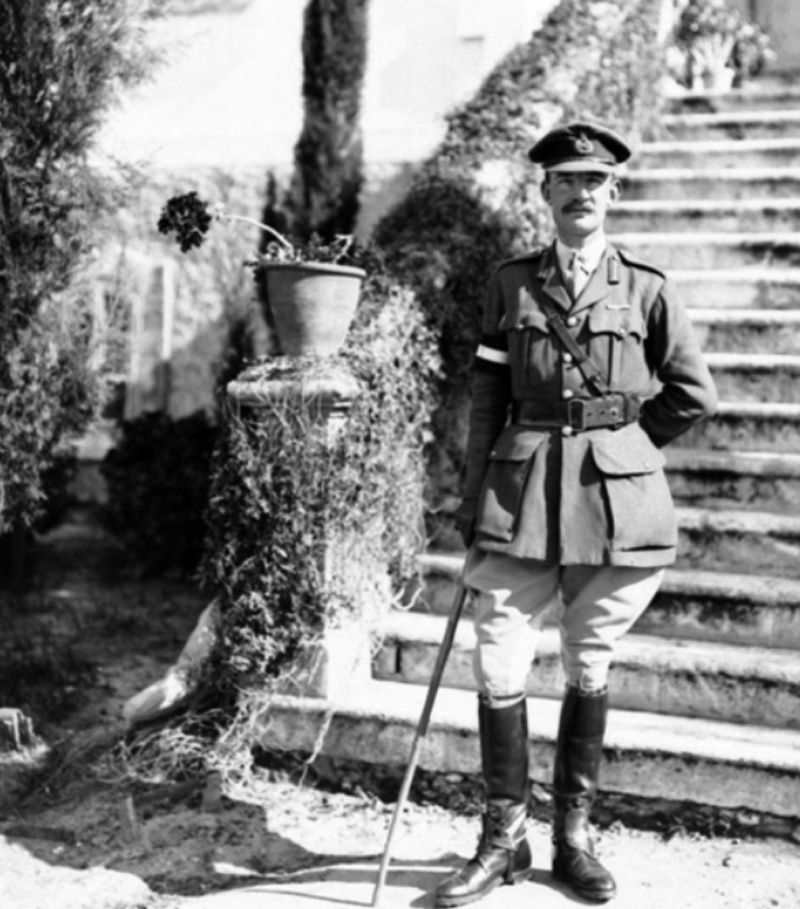
Brigadier General Richard Granville Hylton Howard Vyse
