= Buckhurst Park =

Buckhurst Park may refer to:

In England:

- Buckhurst Park, Berkshire, the seat of the Savory baronets
- Buckhurst Park, East Sussex, the family seat of the Earls De La Warr

In Fiji:

- ANZ National Stadium, a multipurpose stadium in Suva, Fiji, originally built in 1951 as Buckhurst Park
- Buckhurst and Bidesi Parks, athletic playing grounds near Fiji's ANZ National Stadium
