= Sassoon baronets of Bombay (1909) =

The Sassoon baronetcy of Bombay was created on 9 February 1909 in the Baronetage of the United Kingdom, with special remainder, for Jacob Elias Sassoon, elder son of Elias David Sassoon, and nephew of the 1st Baronet of the 1890 creation. The 3rd Baronet was childless, and the title became extinct on his death in 1961.

== Sassoon baronets, of Bombay (1909) ==
- Sir Jacob Elias Sassoon, 1st Baronet (1844 – 22 October 1916), succeeded his father as head of E. D. Sassoon & Co.. He made benefactions to schools, hospitals and the Central College of Science in Bombay (now Mumbai). He had built the Knesset Eliyahoo there (1885), to a design by David Ebenezer Gostling; the Ohel Leah Synagogue in Hong Kong with his brother; and through a bequest the Ohel Rachel Synagogue in Shanghai which was completed in 1916. He left no heir and was succeeded through special remainder by his younger brother Edward.
- Sir Edward Elias Sassoon, 2nd Baronet (6 January 1853 – 2 December 1924), younger son of Elias David Sassoon, a businessman.
- Sir (Ellice) Victor Sassoon, 3rd Baronet (20 December 1881 – 13 August 1961). Known as Victor Sassoon, he was the son of the 2nd Baronet.

== Special remainder ==
The 1st Baronet had no children; a special remainder in the letters patent enabled his younger brother to inherit the title:

The King has been pleased to give directions for the preparation of a Warrant for His Majesty's Royal Sign Manual, authorizing Letters Patent to be passed under the Great Seal of the United Kingdom of Great Britain and Ireland, conferring the dignity of a Baronet of the said United Kingdom upon Jacob Elias Sassoon, of the City of Bombay, in the Empire of India, Esquire, and the heirs male of his body lawfully begotten, with remainder to Edward Elias Sassoon, of Grosvenor-place, in the City of Westminster, Esquire, and the heirs male of his body lawfully begotten.

== Notes ==
Baronetage of the United Kingdom
Preceded by Clouston baronets	Sassoon baronets of Bombay; 9 February 1909	Succeeded by Duckworth baronets
