= Edward Dyce Duckworth =

British colonial judge (1875–1945)

Sir Edward Dyce Duckworth 2nd Baronet (of Grosvenor Place) KStJ
- Born: 10 July 1875
- Died: 6 August 1945 (aged 70)
- Education: Marlborough College; Pembroke College, Oxford
- Occupation: Colonial judge
- Children: 2

Sir Edward Dyce Duckworth 2nd Baronet (of Grosvenor Place) (10 July 1875 – 6 August 1945) was a British lawyer and colonial judge.

== Early life and education ==
Duckworth was born on 10 July 1875, the eldest son of Sir Dyce Duckworth, 1st Baronet and his first wife Annie Alicia Hopkins. He was educated at Marlborough College and Pembroke College, Oxford.

== Career ==
Duckworth joined the Indian Civil Service. He served in the Indian Volunteer Defence Force and the Auxiliary Force. From 1924 to 1927, he served as Puisne Judge of the High Court of Judicature of Burma, the highest court in British Burma, at Rangoon.

Duckworth retired from the Indian Civil Service in 1927, returned to England, and settled in Suffolk at Woodbridge and then Beccles. In 1931 he was appointed County Magistrate. He served as a member of the Joint Committee of the County Council; as Chairman of the County Licensing Committee of Quarter Sessions, East Suffolk, and sat on the board of governors of Ipswich School.

== Personal life and death ==
Duckworth married Cecil Gertrude Leman in 1913 and they had a son, later Sir Richard Dyce Duckworth, 3rd Baronet of Grosvenor Place (1909) (1918–1997) and a daughter. In 1928, on the death of his father Sir Dyce Duckworth, 1st Baronet, he succeeded in the baronetcy.

Duckworth died on 6 August 1945, aged 70.

== Honours ==
Duckworth was created a Knight of Grace of the Order of St John of Jerusalem (KStJ).
