= Stoke Poges =

Village in Buckinghamshire, England

Coordinates: 51.546°N 0.584°W

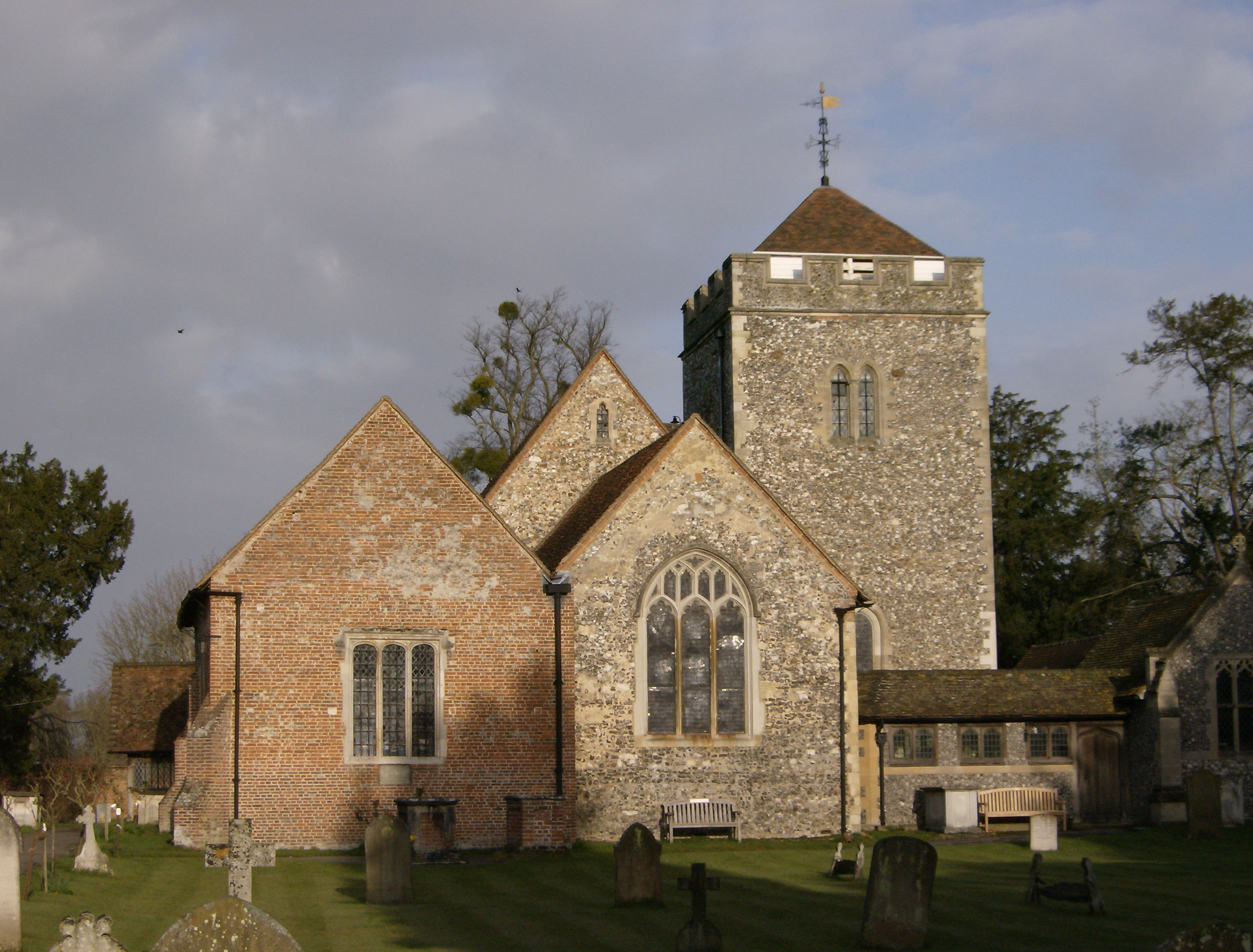
- St Giles' parish church

- Location within Buckinghamshire
- Area: 10.09 km^{2} (3.90 sq mi)
- Population: 5,067 (2021 census)
  - Density: 502/km^{2} (1,300/sq mi)
- OS grid reference: SU9884
  - London: 20.5 miles (33 km) E
- Civil parish: Stoke Poges
- Unitary authority: Buckinghamshire
- Ceremonial county: Buckinghamshire
- Region: South East
- Country: England
- Sovereign state: United Kingdom
- Post town: SLOUGH
- Postcode district: SL2
- Dialling code: 01753
- Police: Thames Valley
- Fire: Buckinghamshire
- Ambulance: South Central
- UK Parliament: Beaconsfield
- Website: Parish Council

Stoke Poges (/ˈstoʊkˈpoʊdʒɪz/) is a village and civil parish in south-east Buckinghamshire, England. It is centred 3 miles (5 km) north-north-east of Slough, its post town, and is 2 miles (3 km) southeast of Farnham Common. In 2021, it had a population of 5,067.

== Geography ==
Hamlets within Stoke Poges parish include:

- Hollybush Hill
- Stoke Green
- West End
- Wexham Street

== Etymology ==
In the name Stoke Poges, stoke means "stockaded (place)" that is staked with more than just boundary-marking stakes. In the Domesday Book of 1086, the village was recorded as Stoche. William Fitz-Ansculf, who held the manor in 1086 (in the grounds of which the Norman parish church was built), later became known as William Stoches or William of Stoke. Two hundred years later Amicia of Stoke, heiress to the manor, married Robert Pogeys, Knight of the Shire, and the village eventually became known as Stoke Poges. Robert Poges was the son of Savoyard Imbert Pugeys, valet to King Henry III and later steward of the royal household. Poges and Pocheys being an English attempt at Pugeys which ironically meant "worthless thing". The spelling appearing as "Stoke Pocheys", if applicable to this village, may suggest the pronunciation of the second part had a slightly more open "o" sound than the word "Stoke".

== Stoke Poges Manor House ==
A manor house at Stoke Poges was built before the Norman Conquest and was mentioned in the 1086 Domesday Book. In 1555 the owner, Francis Hastings, 2nd Earl of Huntingdon, pulled down much of the existing fortified house. He replaced it with a large Tudor brick-built house, with numerous chimneys and gables. In 1599, it was acquired by Sir Edward Coke, who is said to have entertained Queen Elizabeth I there in 1601.

A few decades later, the married lady of the manor, Frances Coke, Viscountess Purbeck, the daughter of Sir Edward Coke, had a love affair with Robert Howard, a member of parliament. The affair's discovery was received as a scandal upon the three people involved, and in 1635 Lady Frances was imprisoned for adultery. She later escaped from prison to France, and eventually returned and lived at Stoke Poges Manor for a time. She died at Oxford in 1645 at the court of King Charles I.

In August 1647, Charles I spent a night or two there, as a prisoner, on his removal from Moor Park, Rickmansworth on the way to his execution.

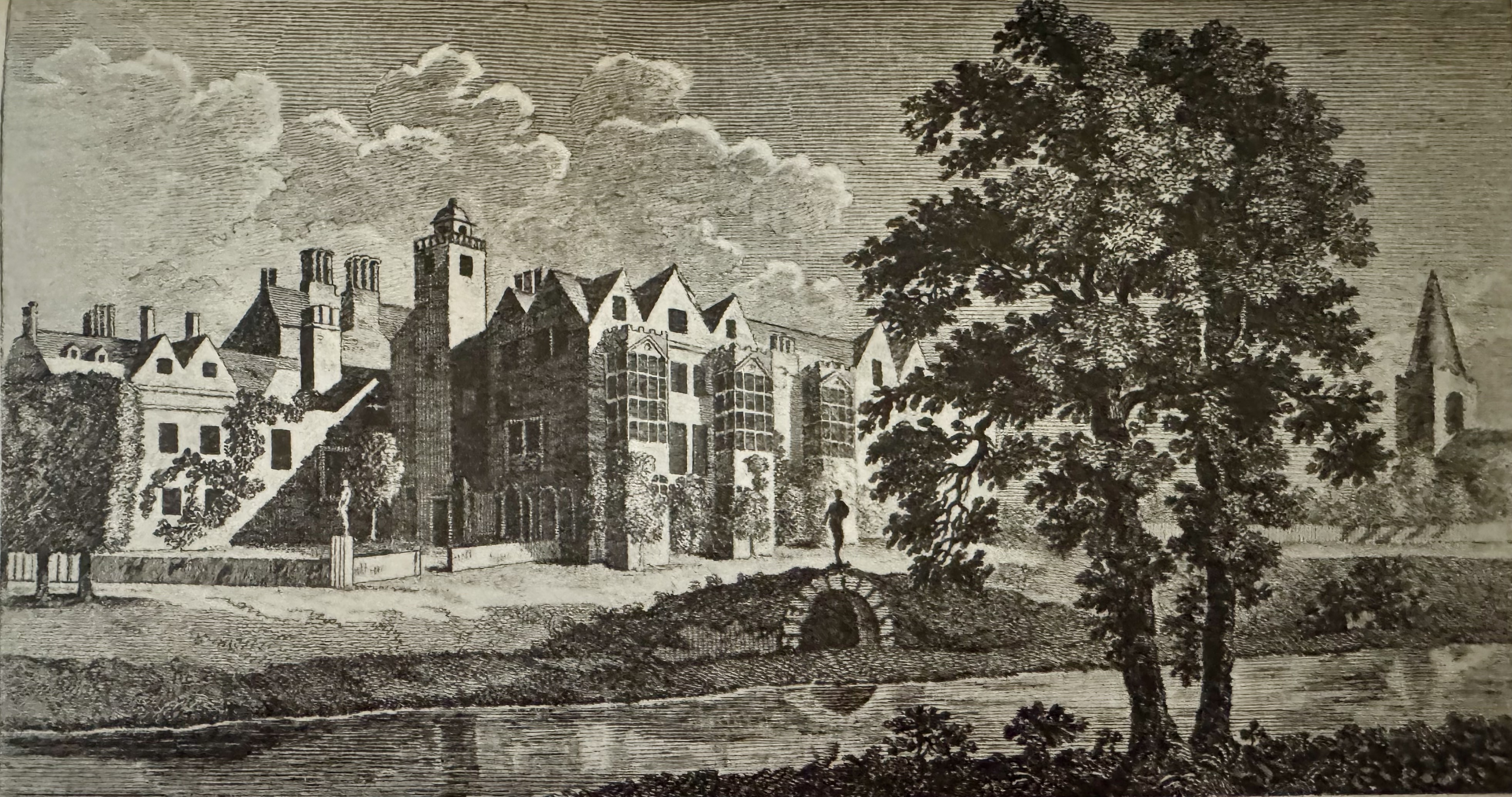
Stoke Manor from around 1753

Later the manor came into the possession of Thomas Penn, a son of William Penn who founded Pennsylvania and was its first proprietor. Thomas Penn held three-fourths of the proprietorship. The manor property remained in his family for at least two generations, as his son John Penn "of Stoke" also lived there. Thomas Gray's 1750 poem "A Long Story" describes the house and its occupants. Sir Edwin Henry Landseer was a frequent visitor to the house and rented it as a studio for some time. His most famous painting, The Monarch of the Glen (1851), is said to have been created at Stoke Poges, with the deer in the park used as models.

In 2012, the property was sold by South Bucks District Council for a sum of £300,000. It was bought by a property developer and was subsequently advertised for sale at £13.5 million.

== Education ==
Stoke Poges has a primary school called The Stoke Poges School. It was rated 'Good' by Ofsted in 2022. On 6 May 1985, four pupils drowned at Land's End during a school trip. Their bereaved parents were angered by Buckinghamshire County Council's offer of £3,500 compensation per child.

A Sikh faith secondary school called Pioneer Secondary Academy opened in 2022. On the site had been Khalsa Secondary Academy which had been rated 'Inadequate ' by Ofsted in 2019 and subsequently closed.

Larchmoor School in Gerrards Cross Road was a major school in England for deaf children which was opened in 1967 by Elizabeth II and ran by the Royal National Institute for Deaf People. It closed in the late 20th century.

Halidon House School was founded 1865, based in Slough and then in 1948 moved to Framewood Manor, Framewood Road. It was a girls school which closed in 1983.

St James Roman Catholic School moved from Richmond in 1830 to Baylis House. The school closed in 1907. Rafael Merry del Val, Cardinal Secretary of State under Pope Pius X was educated at the school.

Stoke House School in Stoke Green was a preparatory school from 1841 to 1913. In 1913, Ted Parry the headmaster relocated the school to Seaford and later it was renamed Stoke Brunswick School.

Long Dene School, moved from Jordans, Buckinghamshire to the Manor House in 1940. In 1945, the school relocated to Chiddingstone Castle, Kent.

== St Giles' Church ==
Thomas Gray's "Elegy Written in a Country Churchyard" is believed to have been written in the churchyard of Saint Giles. The church is a Grade I listed building. Other churches have claimed the honour, including St Laurence's Church, Upton-cum-Chalvey and St Mary's in Everdon, Northamptonshire.

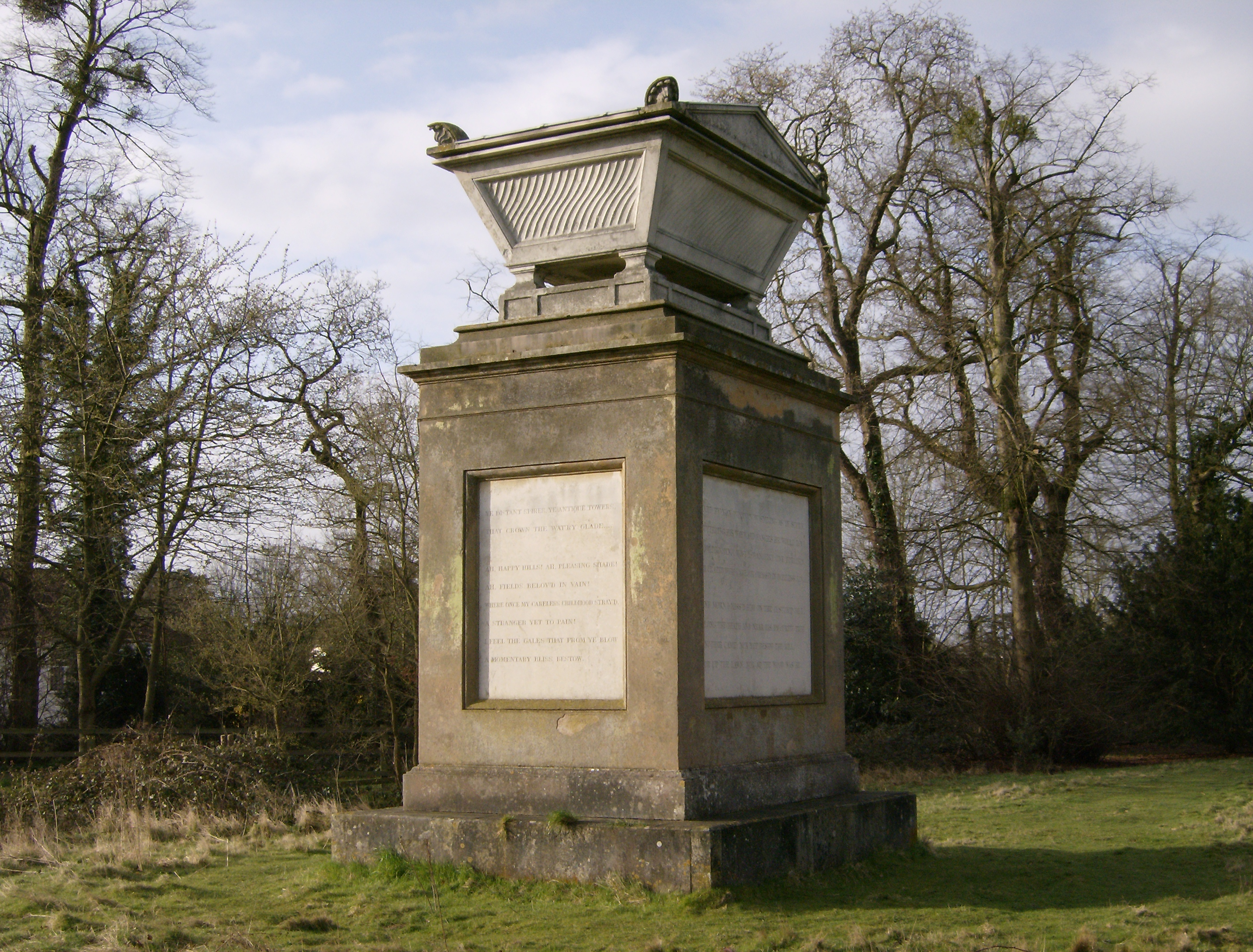
Gray's Monument, Stoke Poges

Gray is buried in a tomb with his mother and aunt in the churchyard. John Penn commissioned James Wyatt to design a monument which is a Grade II* listed building. It bears lines from the Elegy. The monument stands adjacent to St Giles' church and owned by the National Trust.

A lychgate which is now located in the middle of the churchyard was designed by John Oldrid Scott and completed in 1887. In 2022, it became a national heritage asset being listed Grade II.

A gothic style rectory having a battlemented parapet was built by James Wyatt, 1802–1804 for John Penn of Stoke Park. It is now a private residence called Elegy House.

== Sport ==
There are two public recreation grounds: Bells Hill and Plough Lane. In the late 20th century, large private sports facilities operated for the main benefit of Glaxo Laboratories staff at Sefton Park and for Imperial Chemical Industries (ICI) Paints Division at Duffield House, Stoke Green.

Badminton: Stoke Poges Badminton Club has for many decades run in the Village Centre.

Bowls: Stoke Poges Bowls Club was founded in 1978 and closed in 2020. The bowling green was situated in the grounds of the Polish Association in Church Lane. The bowling green had opened in 1949 by St. Helens Cable and Wire Company.

Cricket: Stoke Green Cricket Club in Stoke Green has been playing there since 1879 with support of the then landowner, Howard-Vyse of Stoke Place. Stoke Poges Golf Club at Stoke Park used to run a cricket club in the early 20th century, playing home matches in Farnham Royal.

Darts: In 2023 darts teams from the Village Centre and the Rose and Crown public house in Stoke Poges, compete in the Chalfont and District Darts League.

Football: Stoke Poges Football Club plays on the Bells Hill recreation ground.

Golf: Stoke Park golf course was designed by Harry Colt for Nicholas Lane Jackson who founded it in 1908 as part of England's first golf and country club. It was known as Stoke Poges Golf Club. The South Buckinghamshire Golf Academy consisted of a 9 holes golf course and a golf driving range. It was opened in 1994 and owned by Buckinghamshire County Council. It closed down after the granting of a planning application in 2018 to turn it into a public Country Park. The South Buckinghamshire Golf Course, formerly known as Farnham Park Golf Course, is an 18-hole pay and play course, set in 130 acres of mature wooded parkland owned by Buckinghamshire Council. In 2023 there were two golf clubs using the course: South Buckinghamshire Golf Club and Farnham Park Golf Club. The latter was established at the course in 1977. Wexham Park Golf Centre in Wexham Street, straddles Stoke Poges and Wexham Parishes. It has a variety of golf facilities with a nine hole course being located in Stoke Poges Parish.

Padel: In 2023, Buckinghamshire Council submitted plans to build two padel tennis courts at the South Buckinghamshire Golf Course.

Table Tennis: Stoke Poges Table Tennis Club was founded in 1950. Play used to take place in the pavilion at Sefton Park. In the 21st century it plays at St Andrew's Church Centre in Rogers Lane.

Tennis: Stoke Poges Lawn Tennis Club operates on Bells Hill recreation ground and commenced there in 1949.

== In media ==
- In 1931, Aldous Huxley wrote his book Brave New World which mentions Stoke Poges in it. He frequently visited Stoke Poges golf course.
- In 1957, British Pathé filmed The Vital Vaccine at Sefton Park where Glaxo Laboratories created and manufactured the 'Polyvirin', Britain's Polio vaccine. The Chairman of Glaxo, Sir Harry Jephcott is filmed. It is announced at the start of the film, that it is the former home of the music hall star, Vesta Tilley
- In 1963, the film I Could Go On Singing with Judy Garland's character visits St Giles' parish church with her son.
- In 1964, the golf course at Stoke Park was the setting of a golf match in the James Bond film Goldfinger, played between the principal characters. The map on the dial in Bond's car that tracks Goldfinger's shows Stoke Poges.
- In 1969, Pinewood film studios hired a chemistry laboratory at Fulmer Research Institute for use as a film set for the film The Chairman (also known as The Most Dangerous Man in the World), starring Gregory Peck.
- In 1981, the James Bond film For Your Eyes Only filmed its opening sequence, when Bond visits his wife's grave, in the graveyard at St Giles' Church.
- In 1990, 'Inspector Lynley' crime novel Well-Schooled in Murder by Elizabeth George, and its television adaptation, are set in Stoke Poges.
- In 1996, Nick Hancock's Football Nightmares Nick Hancock is trying to hitchhike to the Victoria Ground in Stoke-on-Trent, but keeps getting dropped off in, or just outside, Stoke Poges.
- In 1997, in the James Bond film Tomorrow Never Dies, Stoke Park hotel doubles as the interior of the Hamburg hotel, where Bond (Pierce Brosnan) drinks his vodka, renews his past relationship with Carver's wife Paris (Teri Hatcher) and struggles with Dr. Kaufman (Götz Otto).
- In 1998, the novel Sharpe's Triumph by Bernard Cornwell was published. In the novel, Arthur Wellesley, 1st Duke of Wellington's dragoon orderly Daniel Fletcher mentions that he is from Stoke Poges: Sharpe replies: "Never heard of it."
- In 2001 and 2004, Stoke Park is featured in the films Bridget Jones's Diary (2001), Layer Cake (2004), Wimbledon (2004), and Bride and Prejudice (2004).
- In 2007, part of the television series Jekyll was filmed on the boardwalk and surrounding area.
- In 2010, the BBC drama series Vexed (series 1, episode 2 – with Toby Stephens and Lucy Punch) was largely filmed in the grounds and inside Stoke Court – which had earlier been Bayer Group UK's conference centre.
- In 2017, the British media caused a furore after the National Galleries of Scotland had bought The Monarch of the Glen painting by Sir Edwin Landseer for £4 million and the view by some that it may have been painted at Stoke Park.
- In 2021, the lease of Stoke Park was bought by Reliance Industries (RIL) for £57 million from the International Group. Later in the year Stoke Park closed for refurbishment.
- In 2021, Stoke Poges Memorial Gardens featured in the BBC programme Great British Railway Journeys presented by Michael Portillo.
- In 2021, in his keynote speech at the Conservative Party Conference, Prime Minister Boris Johnson referred to Thomas Gray and Stoke Poges, about a levelling up vision in terms of an imbalanced society.

== Notable natives and residents ==
- Augustus Henry Eden Allhusen (1867–1925), English politician, resident at Stoke Court, Rogers Lane (1867–1925)
- Christian Allhusen (1806–1890), Danish-English chemical manufacturer, resident at Stoke Court, Rogers Lane.
- John Charles Bell (1844–1924), 1st Baronet, Lord Mayor of London and businessman, resident at Framewood Manor, Framewood Road (1905–1924).
- John Beresford (1866–1944), 5th Baron Decies, Army officer, civil servant and baron, resident at Sefton Park (1905–1917)
- Robert Brooke-Popham (1878–1953), Air Chief Marshal in the Royal Air Force and Governor of Kenya, resident at The Woodlands, Hollybush Hill.
- Wilberforce Bryant (1837–1906), English businessman, owner of Bryant & May match manufacturer and Quaker, resident at Stoke Park (1887-1906).
- Edward Coke (1552–1634), Lord Chief Justice of England and politician, resident at the Manor House (1598-1634).
- Abraham Darby IV (1804–1878), English ironmaster, resident at Stoke Court, Rogers Lane (1851–1872).
- Walter de Frece (1870–1935), British theatre impresario and politician, resident at Sefton Park with his wife, Vesta Tilley in the 1920s.
- Wallace Charles Devereux (1893–1952), English businessman and engineer, founder of Fulmer Research Institute in Stoke Poges and resident at The Meads, Park Road.
- John Thomas Duckworth (1748–1817), Admiral in the Royal Navy and baronet spent his childhood at the Vicarage, Park Road, where his father lived, being the Vicar of Stoke Poges (1754–1748).
- Henry Godolphin (1648–1733) Dr., Provost of Eton College and Dean of St Paul's Cathedral, resident at Baylis House in 18th century.
- Alfred Frank Hardiman (1891-1949), sculptor, resident at Farthing Green house.
- Francis Hastings, 2nd Earl of Huntingdon (1514–1561), 2nd Earl of Huntingdon, politician, 1555 completed building of the Manor house.
- Elizabeth Hatton (1578–1646), 2nd wife of Edward Coke, resident at the Manor House.
- George Howard (1718–1796), Field Marshal in British Army and politician, resident at Stoke Place, Stoke Green (c.1764–1796).
- Richard Howard-Vyse (1883–1962), Major General and Honorary Colonel of the Royal Horse Guards, resident at Stoke Place, Stoke Green (1883–1962)
- Richard William Howard Howard Vyse (1784–1853), Major General and Egyptologist, born in Stoke Poges and resident at Stoke Place, Stoke Greens.
- Alfred Webster 'Morgan' Kingston (1875–1936), tenor, opera singer, resident in Templewood Lane.
- Henry Labouchere (1798–1869), 1st Baron Taunton, British Whig politician, resident at Stoke Park (1848–1863).
- Henry Martin (Marten) (c.1562–1641), King's Advocate for James I and Judge of Admiralty Court is reported to have been born at Stoke Poges.
- Noel Mobbs (1878–1959), businessman, founder of Slough Estates, resident at Stoke Park (1928–1959).
- William Moleyns (1378–1425), politician, administrator, knight to Henry V, resident at the Manor House.
- Bernard Oppenheimer (1866–1921), diamond merchant and philanthropist, resident at Sefton Park, Bells Hill (1917-1921).
- Sydney Godolphin Osborne (1808–1889), Lord, cleric, writer, philanthropist, vicar of Stoke Poges (1832–1841).
- Granville Penn (1761–1844), author, scriptural geologist and civil servant, resident at Stoke Park (1761–1844).
- John Penn (1760–1834), Chief Proprietor of Province of Pennsylvania, politician and writer, resident at Stoke Park (1760–1834).
- Thomas Penn (1702–1775), son of William Penn and proprietor of Province of Pennsylvania, with three-fourths holding, resident at the Manor House, Stoke Park (1760–1775).
- Borradaile Savory (1855–1906), English clergyman and baronet, resident at The Woodlands, Hollybush Hill (1855–1906).
- William Scovell Savory (1826–1895), British Surgeon and baronet, resident at The Woodlands, Hollybush Hill (1884–1895).
- Philip Stanhope (1694–1773), 4th Earl of Chesterfield, British statesman and diplomat, resident at Baylis house in 18th century.
- Vesta Tilley (Matilda Alice Powles) (1864–1952), music hall performer, resident at Sefton Park in the 1920s with her husband Walter de Frece.
- Alexander Wedderburn (1733–1805), 1st Earl of Rosslyn, Lord High Chancellor, resident at Baylis House, late 18th century and early 19th century.

=== Sports ===
- Ruth Durlacher (1876–1946), Irish tennis player and golfer, resident at the White House and Pinegrove, Stoke Green, in early 20th century.
- Walter Evelyn Gilliat (1869-1963), England footballer and Minister in the Church of England, resident at Duffield House where his father, Algernon, lived, Stoke Green
- Nick 'Pa' Lane Jackson (1849–1937), founder of Stoke Park, sports administrator and author, resident Stoke Park (1908–1928).
- Jacques Laffite (born 1943) the French Formula One racing driver who won six Grands Prix for Ligier during the late 1970s and early 1980s, lived in Stoke Poges during some of his racing career.
- William Molyneux, 2nd Earl of Sefton (1772–1838), sportsman and gambler, resident at Stoke Farm, now known as Sefton Park (1795–1838).
- Edward Hagarty Parry (1855–1931), International footballer & school headmaster, resident at Stoke House School, Stoke Green, (1855-1913).

== Notable organisations ==
- Comer Group, is a real estate company which c.2010 became the owner of Stoke Court for part of its residential portfolio.
- Hitachi Data Systems, is a subsidiary of Hitachi. It provides technology and services relating to digital data. UK Headquarters at Sefton Park, Bells Hill, Stoke Poges.
- International Group operates a group of companies in the leisure, sales, marketing, management, healthcare services and property development and ownership. Registered at Stoke Park until 2021, when the lease was sold to Reliance Industries
- Reliance Industries Limited (RIL), an Indian multinational conglomerate, on the Global 500 list, bought the lease of Stoke Park in 2021
- Servier Laboratories Ltd, is part of a French centric international pharmaceutical group. UK Headquarters at Sefton Park, Bells Hill, Stoke Poges.
- Urenco Ltd, a nuclear fuel company, operating internationally running uranium enrichment plants. Headquarters at Sefton Park, Bells Hill, Stoke Poges.
- Fulmer Research Institute, a pioneer contract research and development organisation. Its Headquarters was in Hollybush Hill, Stoke Poges from 1946 to 1990.
- Glaxo Laboratories Ltd, now part of GSK, a fermentation and vaccine research laboratory at Sefton Park, Bells Hill, Stoke Poges from 1948 to 1982: (NB: see 'In Media' section above - 1957, British Pathé filmed The Vital Vaccine at Sefton Park)
- Miles Laboratories, a US pharmaceutical and life sciences company. UK headquarters in Stoke Court, Rogers Lane, Stoke Poges from 1959 to 1978 when Bayer acquired it.

== Demography ==
Census population of Stoke Poges parish
Census year	Population	Households
2001	4,414	1,764
2011	4,752	1,832
2021	5,067	1,887

Stoke Poges at the 2001 census
Measure	Stoke Poges ward	South Bucks borough	England
Population	4,839	61,945	49,138,831
Foreign born	11.9%	12.2%	9.2%
White	93.3%	93.4%	90.9%
Asian	4.8%	4.5%	4.6%
Black	0.3%	0.4%	2.3%
Christian	76.5%	75.6%	71.7%
Muslim	1.1%	1.1%	3.1%
Hindu	0.7%	1.2%	1.1%
No religion	10.6%	12.5%	14.6%
Unemployed	1.8%	1.9%	3.3%
Retired	16.8%	14.8%	13.5%

At the 2001 UK census, the Stoke Poges electoral ward had a population of 4,839. The ethnicity was 93.3% white, 1.3% mixed race, 4.8% Asian, 0.3% black and 0.3% other. The place of birth of residents was 88.1% United Kingdom, 1.6% Republic of Ireland, 2.5% other Western European countries, and 7.8% elsewhere. Religion was recorded as 76.5% Christian, 0.2% Buddhist, 0.7% Hindu, 2.7% Sikh, 0.5% Jewish, and 1.1% Muslim. 10.6% were recorded as having no religion, 0.2% had an alternative religion and 7.6% did not state their religion.

The economic activity of residents aged 16–74 was 40.8% in full-time employment, 11.6% in part-time employment, 12.6% self-employed, 1.8% unemployed, 1.5% students with jobs, 3.1% students without jobs, 16.8% retired, 6.7% looking after home or family, 2.5% permanently sick or disabled and 2.5% economically inactive for other reasons. The industry of employment of residents was 15.4% retail, 13.4% manufacturing, 6.9% construction, 21.1% real estate, 9.2% health and social work, 7.3% education, 8.8% transport and communications, 3.5% public administration, 3.4% hotels and restaurants, 2.8% finance, 0.8% agriculture and 7.4% other. Compared with national figures, the ward had a relatively high proportion of workers in real estate, transport and communications. According to Office for National Statistics estimates, during the period of April 2001 to March 2002 the average gross weekly income of households was £870, compared with an average of £660 in South East England. Of the ward's residents aged 16–74, 28.4% had a higher education qualification or the equivalent, compared with 19.9% nationwide.

In 2011, The Daily Telegraph deemed Stoke Poges as Britain's eighth richest village and the third richest village in Buckinghamshire.

2011 published statistics: population, home ownership and extracts from physical environment, surveyed in 2005
Output area	Homes owned outright	Owned with a loan	Socially rented	Privately rented	Other	km^{2} roads	km^{2} water	km^{2} domestic gardens	km^{2} domestic buildings	km^{2} non-domestic buildings	Usual residents	km^{2}
Civil parish	727	717	183	159	28	0.397	0.076	1.422	0.176	0.057	4,752	10.09
