= James Duckworth =

James or Jim Duckworth may refer to:

- Sir James Duckworth (businessman, born 1840) (1840–1915), British businessman and Liberal Member of Parliament
- James Duckworth (businessman, born 1869) (1869–1937), British businessman and son of Sir James Duckworth
- James Duckworth (tennis) (born 1992), Australian tennis player
- Sir James Edward Dyce Duckworth, 5th Baronet (born 1984), of the Duckworth baronets
- Jim Duckworth (baseball) (1939–2025), baseball pitcher
- Jim Duckworth (musician) (born 1957), American blues guitarist
- Jim Duckworth (rugby league) (1908–1967), Australian rugby league footballer, coach and administrator
- James Duckworth (rugby league) (born 1994), English rugby league footballer
