= Duckworth baronets of Grosvenor Place (1909) =

Escutcheon of the Duckworth baronets of Grosvenor Place

The Duckworth baronetcy, of Grosvenor Place in the City of Westminster, was created in the Baronetage of the United Kingdom on 15 July 1909 for the prominent physician Sir Dyce Duckworth. He was Treasurer of the Royal College of Physicians from 1884 to 1923 and Honorary Physician to Edward VII when Prince of Wales from 1890 to 1901.

== Duckworth baronets, of Grosvenor Place (1909) ==
- Sir Dyce Duckworth, 1st Baronet (1840–1928)
- Sir Edward Dyce Duckworth, 2nd Baronet (1875–1945)
- Sir Richard Dyce Duckworth, 3rd Baronet (1918–1997)
- Sir Edward Richard Dyce Duckworth, 4th Baronet (1943–2005)
- Sir James Edward Dyce Duckworth, 5th Baronet (born 1984)

The heir presumptive to the baronetcy is Antony George Dyce Duckworth (born 1946), 2nd son of the 3rd Baronet and uncle to the current Baronet.

== Notes ==
Baronetage of the United Kingdom
Preceded by Sassoon baronets	Duckworth baronets of Grosvenor Place; 15 July 1909	Succeeded by Truscott baronets
