= William Scovell Savory =

British surgeon (1826–1895)

William Scovell Savory FRS, FRCP
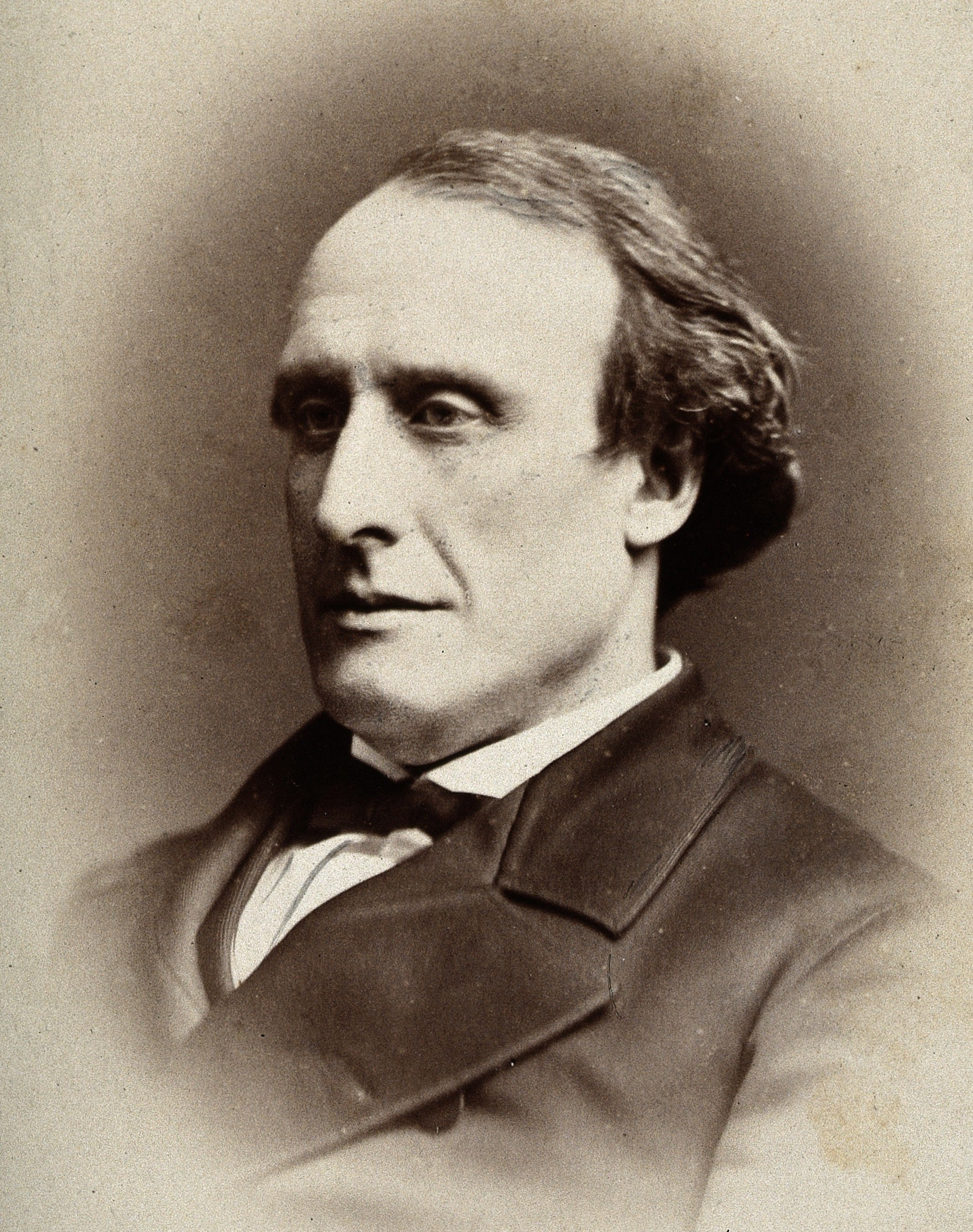
- Sir William Savory
- Born: 30 November 1826; London, England
- Died: 4 March 1895 (aged 68); London, England
- Resting place: Highgate Cemetery
- Occupation: Surgeon

Sir William Scovell Savory, 1st Baronet FRS, FRCP (30 November 1826 – 4 March 1895) was a British surgeon.

== Biography ==
He was born in London, the son of William Henry Savory, and his second wife, Mary Webb. He entered St Bartholomew's Hospital as a student in 1844, becoming M.R.C.S. in 1847, and F.R.C.S. in 1852. From 1849 to 1859, he was demonstrator of anatomy and operative surgery at St Bartholomew's, and for many years curator of the museum, where he devoted himself to pathological and physiological work. In June 1858, he was elected a Fellow of the Royal Society for his papers on "the structure and connections of the valves of the human heart – On the development of striated muscular fibre in Mammalia – Phil Trans 1855 [and] on the relative temperature of arterial and venous Blood".

In 1859, he succeeded Sir James Paget as lecturer on general anatomy and physiology. In 1861, he became assistant surgeon, and in 1867 surgeon, holding the latter post till 1891; and from 1869 to 1889 he was lecturer on surgery. In the College of Surgeons he was a man of the greatest influence, and was president for four successive years, 1885–1888. As Hunterian professor of comparative anatomy and physiology (1859–1861), he lectured on General Physiology and the Physiology of Food. In 1884, he delivered the Bradshaw Lecture (on the Pathology of Cancer) and in 1887 the Hunterian oration to the Royal College of Physicians.

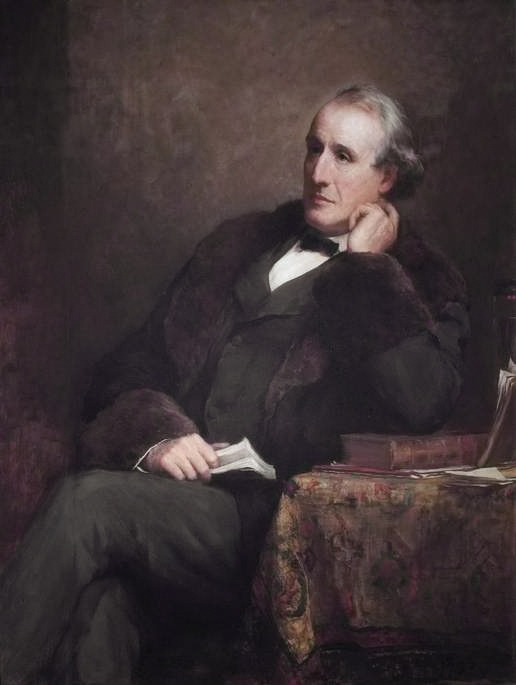
William Scovell Savory (Walter William Ouless, 1893)

In 1879, at Cork, he had declared against Listerism at the meeting of the British Medical Association, the last public expression, it has been said, by a prominent surgeon against the now accepted method of modern surgery. In 1887, he became surgeon-extraordinary to Queen Victoria, and, in 1890 he was made a baronet. Savory, who was an able operator, but averse from exhibitions of brilliancy, was a powerful and authoritative man in his profession, his lucidity of expression being almost as valuable as his great knowledge of physiology and anatomy.

== Personal life ==
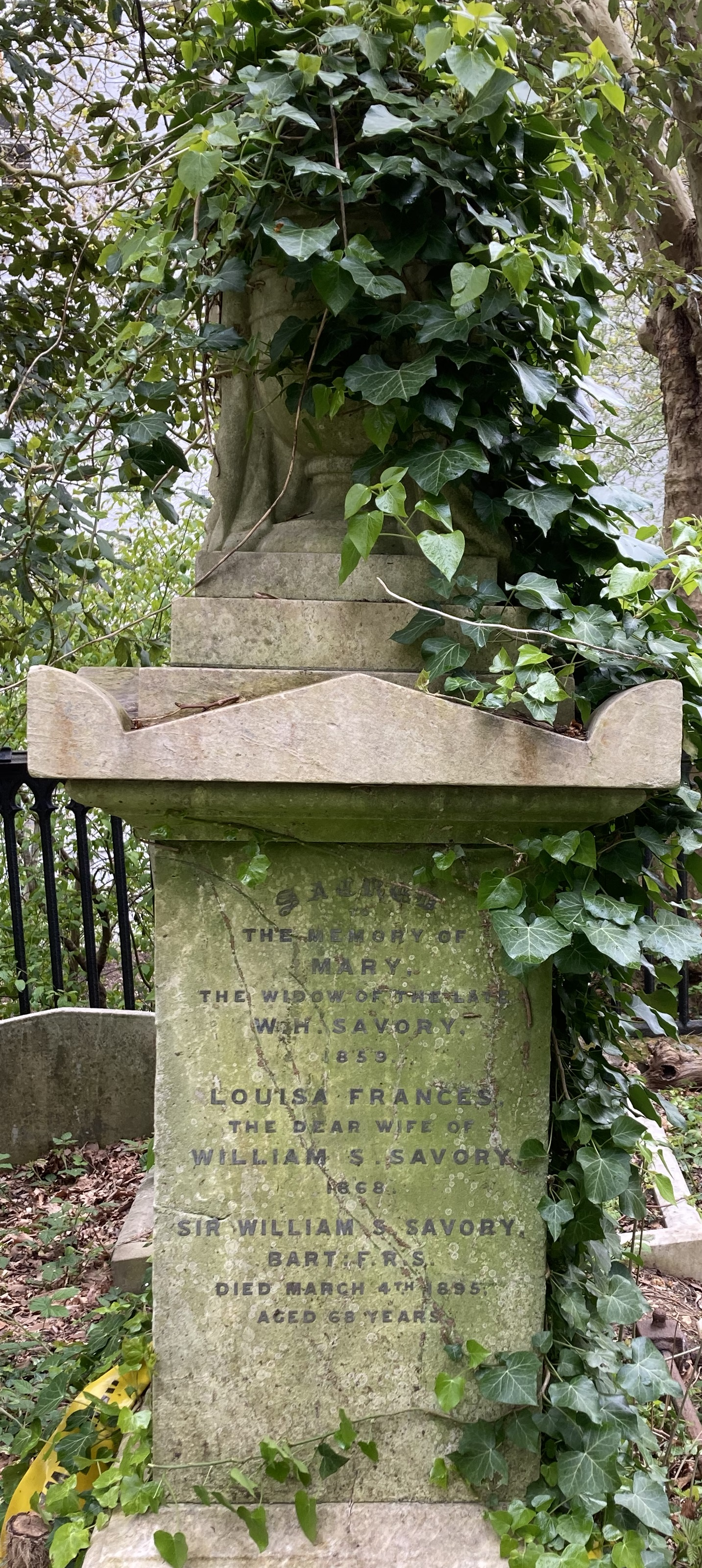
Grave of Sir William Scovell Savory in Highgate Cemetery

On 30 November 1854, he married Louisa Frances Borradaile (1821–1867). They had an only son, Borradaile Savory. In 1884, he bought a country property called The Woodlands, Hollybush Hill, Stoke Poges, Buckinghamshire.

He died on the 4 March 1895, aged 68, in London and was buried on the western side of Highgate Cemetery.

Baronetage of the United Kingdom
New creation	Baronet (of The Woodlands); 1890–1895	Succeeded by Borradaile Savory
