= Edward Clouston =

Canadian banker and baronet (1849–1912)

Sir Edward Clouston, Bt
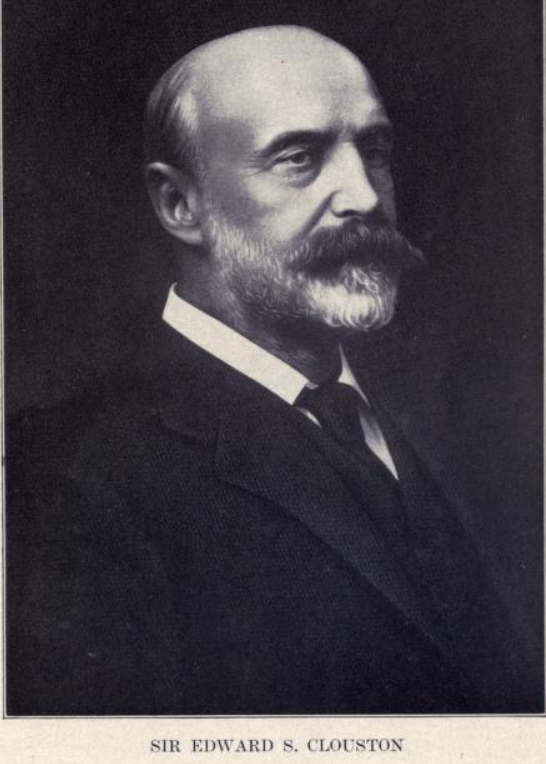
- Born: Edward Seaborne Clouston; May 9, 1849; Moose Factory, Rupert's Land
- Died: November 23, 1912 (aged 63); Montreal, Quebec
- Occupation: Banker
- Employer: Bank of Montreal
- Spouse: Annie Easton
- Children: 2 daughters

Sir Edward Seaborne Clouston, 1st Baronet (May 9, 1849 – November 23, 1912) was a Canadian banker and financier who became the General Manager of the Bank of Montreal.

== Life and career ==
He was born in Moose Factory to James Stewart Clouston (1826–1874), the last Chief Factor of the Hudson's Bay Company (HBC), and his wife Margaret, daughter of Robert Seaborn Miles (1795–1870), in his time also Chief Factor for the HBC and Sheriff of Rupert's Land. His grandfather was agent for the HBC at Stromness on Orkney, where his family had lived since the end of the 17th century, descended from Richard Clouston (1626–1666), 16th of Clouston and Netherbigging, Stromness.

Clouston received his education at the High School of Montreal and then worked for one year for the Hudson's Bay Company before commencing employment at the Bank of Montreal as a clerk in 1865. He became assistant general manager of the bank in 1887, general manager in 1890 and first vice-president in 1906. He was created a baronet in 1908.

Clouston was elected president of the Canadian Bankers Association on several occasions and, in this capacity, advised successive Canadian Ministers of Finance.

He served as vice-president of the Royal Trust Company and as a director of the Guarantee Company of North America, the Canadian Cottons, Limited, the Canada Sugar Refining Company, the Ogilvie Flour Mills Company, and the Kaministikwia Power Company. He was chairman of the Canadian board of the Liverpool & London & Globe Insurance Company and the Mutual Life Insurance Company of New York.

== Family ==
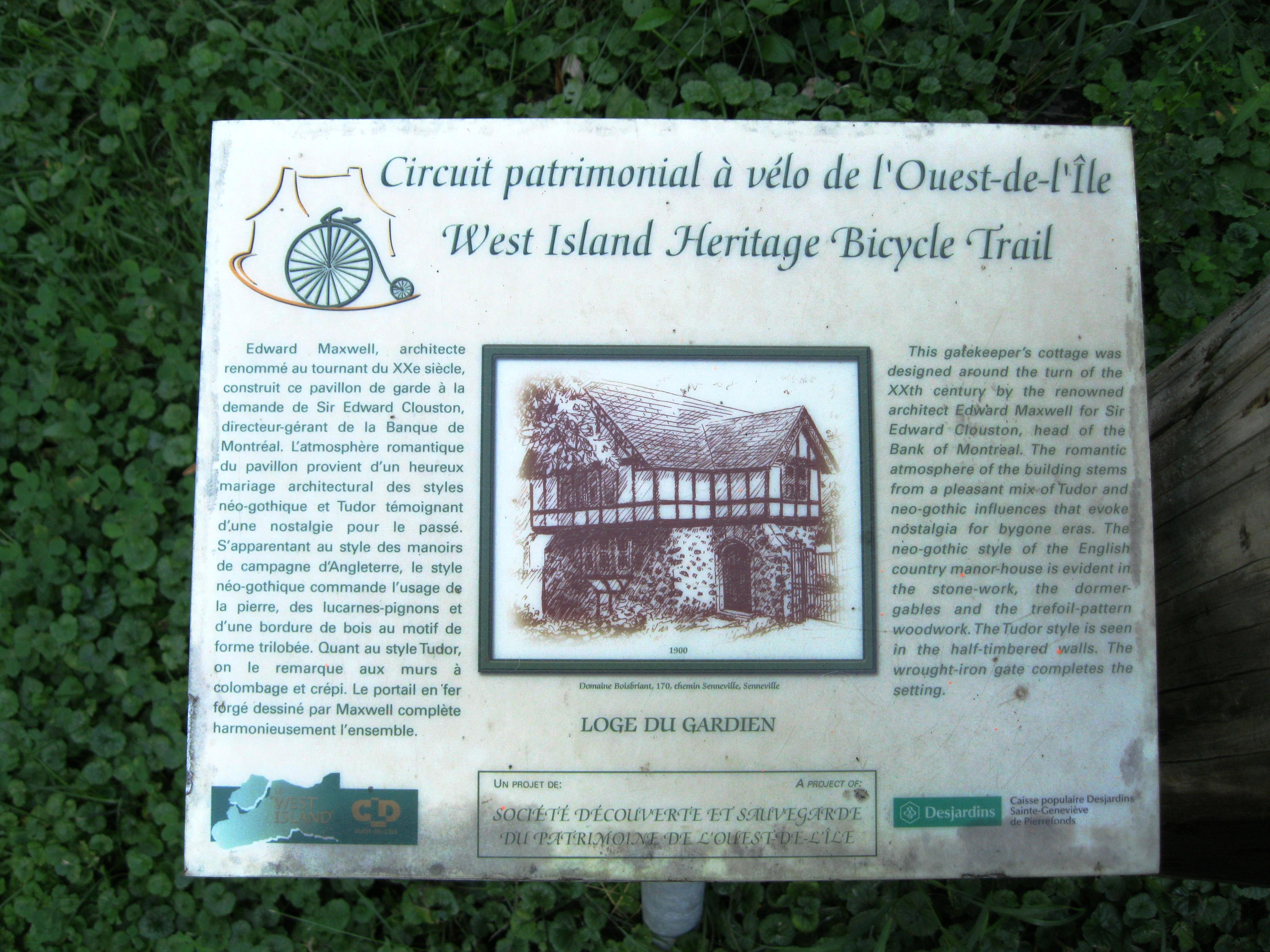
A plaque at Clouston's former estate in Senneville, Quebec

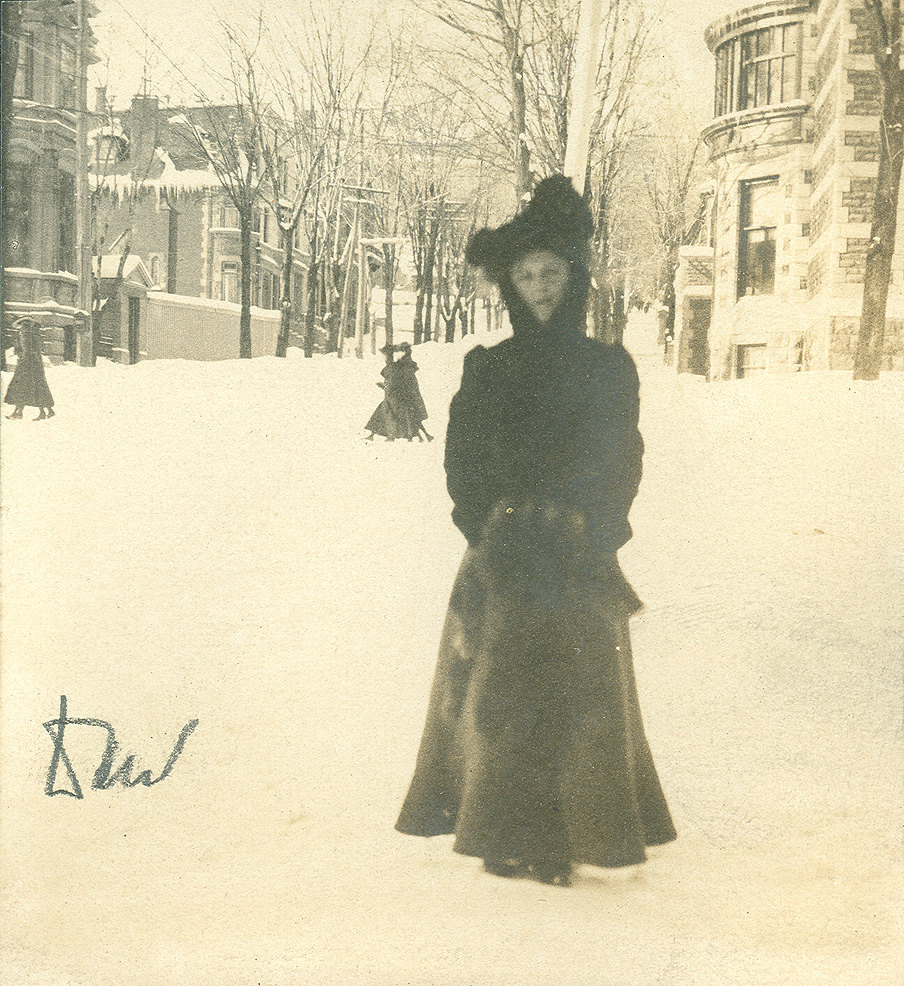
Marjory Clouston, c. 1902

In 1878, Clouston married Annie Easton, daughter of George Easton, Collector of Customs in Brockville, Ontario, and his wife Isabella Jane. She was born in Brockville and was educated at the Bishop Strachan School in Toronto. The couple had two daughters, of whom one, Marjory Meredith Clouston (1882–1945), survived. She married John Lancelot Todd, professor of parasitology at McGill University, in 1911 and they were the parents of three daughters.

Lady Clouston was interested in charitable works. In 1895, she was elected vice-president of a committee to preserve Mount Royal Park. She was elected an office-bearer of the Woman's National Immigration Society. The family residences included a country house named Boisbriant at 170 Senneville Road in Senneville, Quebec, which was formerly owned by Sir John Abbott.

His nephew, James Campbell Clouston, played a pivotal role during the Dunkirk evacuation.

Baronetage of the United Kingdom
New creation	Baronet (of Montreal); 1908–1912	Extinct
Preceded by Hatch baronets	Clouston baronets of Montreal; 3 December 1908	Succeeded by Sassoon baronets
