= Thompson baronets of Park Gate (1890) =

Escutcheon of the Thompson baronets of Park Gate

The Thompson baronetcy, of Park Gate in Guiseley in the County of York, was created in the Baronetage of the United Kingdom on 18 April 1890 for Matthew Thompson, after the opening of the Forth Bridge on 4 March of that year. He was Chairman of the Forth Bridge and Midland Railway companies and also briefly represented Bradford in Parliament during 1867–8.

== Thompson baronets, of Park Gate (1890) ==
- Sir Matthew William Thompson, 1st Baronet (1820–1891)
- Sir Peile Thompson, 2nd Baronet (1844–1918)
- Sir Matthew William Thompson, 3rd Baronet (1872–1956)
- Sir Peile Beaumont Thompson, 4th Baronet (1874–1972)
- Sir Peile Thompson, MBE, 5th Baronet (1911–1985)
- Sir Christopher Peile Thompson, 6th Baronet (born 1944)

The heir apparent to the baronetcy is Peile Richard Thompson (born 1975), only son of the 6th Baronet.

== Notes ==
Baronetage of the United Kingdom
Preceded by Fowler baronets	Thompson baronets of Park Gate; 18 April 1890	Succeeded by Hozier baronets

}
