= Mackenzie baronets of Glen Muick (1890) =

Escutcheon of the Mackenzie baronets of Glen Muick

The Mackenzie baronetcy, of Glen Muick (pronounced "Mick") in the County of Aberdeen, was created in the Baronetage of the United Kingdom on 21 March 1890 for James Thompson Mackenzie, a Deputy Lieutenant for Ross-shire and Middlesex. The 3rd Baronet was a Colonel in the Scots Guards and courtier.

The presumed 5th Baronet has not successfully proven his succession as of 2026, and the Official Roll of the Baronetage considers the baronetcy dormant.

== Mackenzie baronets, of Glen Muick (1890) ==
- Sir James Thompson Mackenzie, 1st Baronet (1818–1890). He was a banker, known as a founder in 1868, with Samuel Laing, Lord Westbury and Philip Rose, of the pioneering Foreign & Colonial Investment Trust.
- Sir Allan Russell Mackenzie, 2nd Baronet (1850–1906)
- Sir Victor Audley Falconer Mackenzie, 3rd Baronet (1882–1944)
- Sir (Alexander George Anthony) Allan Mackenzie, 4th Baronet (1913–1993)
- (James William) Guy Mackenzie, presumed 5th Baronet (born 1946)

The heir presumptive is the presumed Baronet's brother Allan Walter Mackenzie (born 1952).

== Notes ==
Baronetage of the United Kingdom
| Preceded by Dillwyn-Llewelyn baronets | Mackenzie baronets of Glen Muick; 21 March 1890 | Succeeded by Sassoon baronets |

}
