= Fowler baronets of Braemore (1890) =

Escutcheon of the Fowler baronets of Braemore

The Fowler baronetcy of Braemore in the County of Ross was a title created in the Baronetage of the United Kingdom on 17 April 1890, for John Fowler, civil engineer for the Metropolitan Railway and the Forth Railway Bridge.

The title became extinct in 1933 on the death of the 4th Baronet who left no male heir.

== Fowler baronets, of Braemore (1890) ==
- John Fowler, 1st Baronet (15 July 1817 – 20 November 1898)
- John Arthur Fowler, 2nd Baronet (27 June 1854 – 27 March 1899), son of the 1st Baronet
- John Edward Fowler, 3rd Baronet (21 April 1885 – 22 June 1915), son of the 2nd Baronet
- Rev. Montague Fowler, 4th Baronet (12 November 1858 – 1 April 1933), third son of the 1st Baronet. He had two daughters but no son.

== Notes ==
Baronetage of the United Kingdom
Preceded by Savory baronets	Fowler baronets of Braemore; 17 April 1890	Succeeded by Thompson baronets

}
