= Thomas Duckworth =

Thomas Duckworth may refer to:

- Thomas E. Duckworth (born 1942), American acupuncturist
- Tommy Duckworth, a fictional character from British television soap opera Coronation Street
- Teddy Duckworth (Thomas Crook Duckworth, 1882–?), English football player and manager
