= Borradaile Savory =

English clergyman and baronet (1855–1906)

Sir Borradaile Savory, 2nd Baronet (5 October 1855 – 12 September 1906) was an English clergyman and baronet.

Savory was born in Charterhouse Square, London, the only child of Sir William Scovell Savory Bt FRS FRCP, Surgeon-Extraordinary to Queen Victoria, and his wife Louisa Frances Borradaile.

He was educated at University College School, London, and Trinity College, Cambridge, matriculating in 1875, graduating B.A. 1879 (M.A. 1882). He was ordained deacon in 1880, and priest in 1881.

He held the following positions in the church:

- Curate of St George's, Hanover Square, London, 1880–4
- Clerk-in-Ordinary, 1884–7
- Rector of St Bartholomew-the-Great, 1887–1906
- Chaplain of the Order of St John of Jerusalem, 1890–1906
- Senior Grand Chaplain of English Freemasons, 1901

He was also Honorary Chaplain of the Royal Army Medical Corps, and President of Sion College in 1905.

He succeeded his father in the Savory baronetcy as the 2nd baronet in 1895.

He lived latterly at The Woodlands, Hollybush Hill, Stoke Poges, Buckinghamshire, where he died on 12 September 1906.

== Family ==
On 8 July 1881, Savory married Florence Julia Pavy, daughter of the physician Frederick William Pavy FRS. Their son William Borradaile Savory (1882–1961) succeeded him as the 3rd baronet.

Baronetage of the United Kingdom
Preceded by William Scovell Savory	Baronet (of The Woodlands); 1895–1906	Succeeded by William Borradaile Savory
