= Richard Howard-Vyse =

British general (1883–1962)

Major-General Sir Richard Howard-Vyse KCMG DSO JP DL
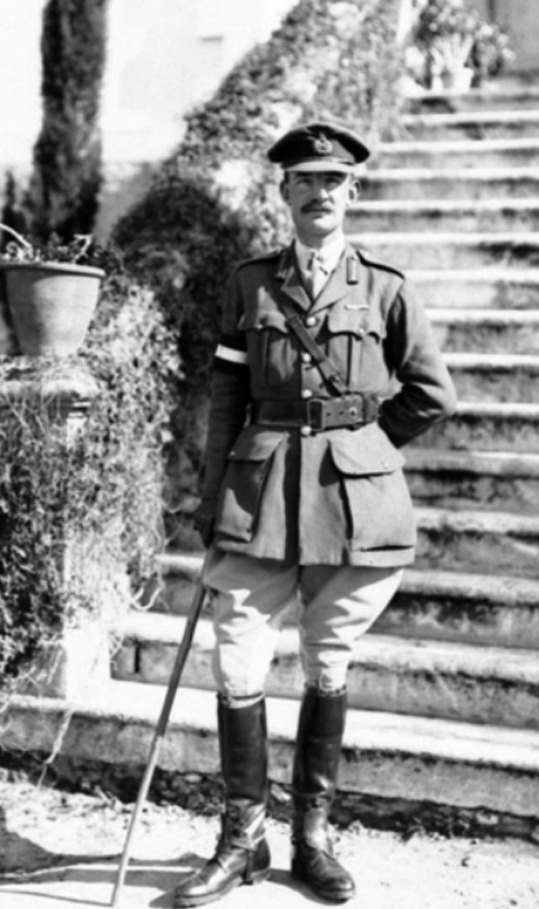
- Born: 27 June 1883
- Died: 5 December 1962 (aged 79)
- Military career
- Allegiance: United Kingdom
- Branch: British Army
- Service years: 1902–1935; 1939–1940
- Rank: Major-General
- Nickname: "Wombat"
- Service number: 13984
- Unit: Royal Horse Guards
- Commands: Equitation School (1930–34); Cairo Cavalry Brigade (1928–30); Royal Horse Guards (1922–26); Zeitoun School of Instruction (1918–19); 10th Cavalry Brigade (1918)
- Conflicts: First World War; Second World War
- Awards: Knight Commander Order of St Michael and St George; Distinguished Service Order; Mentioned in Despatches
- Other work: Justice of the Peace; Deputy Lieutenant; High Sheriff of Buckinghamshire; Gold Stick

Major-General Sir Richard Granville Hylton Howard-Vyse, KCMG, DSO, JP, DL (27 June 1883 – 5 December 1962) was a cavalry officer in the British Army.

Howard-Vyse served in the First World War commanding the 10th Cavalry Brigade, and in the Second World War as the Head of British Military Mission to French High Command from 1939 to 1940. He was invested as a Knight Commander Order of St Michael and St George and awarded the Distinguished Service Order. He also held the office of Deputy Lieutenant of Buckinghamshire, and was a Justice of the Peace.

== Early life ==
Richard Granville Hylton Howard-Vyse was born on 27 June 1883, the son of Howard Henry Howard-Vyse and Mabel Diana Howard-Vyse of Stoke Poges Buckinghamshire. He had two siblings, George Cecil Howard-Vyse died, and Lilly Eleanor Howard-Vyse.

== Military career ==
Howard-Vyse was commissioned as a second-lieutenant in the Royal Horse Guards in December 1902. Five years later, in 1907, he was a lieutenant and made regimental adjutant in September that year. In March the following year he relinquished being adjutant, and in April was promoted to captain.

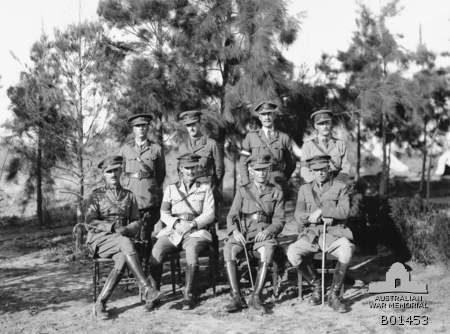
Brigadier-General Howard-Vyse, standing second right

Howard-Vyse attended the British Army's Staff College, Camberley, from January 1911. After Staff College he became a brigade major for the 5th Cavalry Brigade, still ranked as a captain, in May 1914. By July 1915 he was a General Staff officer 2nd Grade, still with the 5th Cavalry Brigade.

In 1917, following a request from General Sir Edmund Allenby, Howard-Vyse was sent to the Middle East as the Chief Staff Officer for the Desert Mounted Corps, with the brevet rank of lieutenant colonel and the temporary rank of brigadier general. For his service he was made a Companion of the Order of St Michael and St George in April 1918. Then in July 1918 he assumed the command of the 10th Cavalry Brigade.

=== Post war ===
Howard-Vyse became the next commandant of the Zeitoun School of Instruction, in Cairo. It was followed by command of his regiment, the Royal Horse Guards, from 1922 to 1926. It was at Cairo that he married Phyllis Hermione, daughter of Francis Saxham Elwas Drury, on 15 October 1925. He returned to the War Office in 1927 as a grade 1 General Staff officer; and thence was sent to Egypt in 1928 as the commander of the Cairo Cavalry Brigade.

His next appointment was as commandant of the Equitation School and inspector of cavalry, a post he held from 11 August 1930 until 11 August 1934 when he relinquished the assignment. While serving in this role, he was promoted to major general on 10 November 1933. Upon ceasing to be employed, he was placed on half-pay.

He was then made the chief of staff to Prince Henry, Duke of Gloucester for his tour of Australia, being awarded a knighthood.

=== Later career ===
Howard-Vyse retired from the army in 1935, and in November 1937 was admitted to the King's Bench Division of the High Court of Justice and became the High Sheriff of Buckinghamshire. He became the Honorary Colonel of the 99th (Buckinghamshire and Berkshire Yeomanry) Field Regiment, Royal Artillery from 1938. He was recalled to military service, with a special appointment, in August 1939, becoming the head of British Military Mission to the French High Command and returning to the reserve list when he relinquished his special appointment in July 1940. On 14 June 1940, Howard-Vyse was told by General Sir Alan Brooke to fly home to London to explain to John Dill (CIGS) that the proposed Brittany Defence Scheme (Redoubt) was quite impossible, and all British troops should be evacuated from France as quickly as possible. Later that day at Le Mans (the Lines of Communications Headquarters) Brooke had a difficult phone call from Dill and then Churchill before Churchill agreed.

In June 1950 Howard-Vyse was removed from the reserve list by reason of age, and became the honorary colonel of the Royal Horse Guards in July 1951. As such, for the Coronation of Queen Elizabeth II he was the Gold Stick in Waiting. Sir Richard Granville Hylton Howard-Vyse died on 5 December 1962.
