= Nicholas Lane Jackson =

English sports administrator (1849–1937)

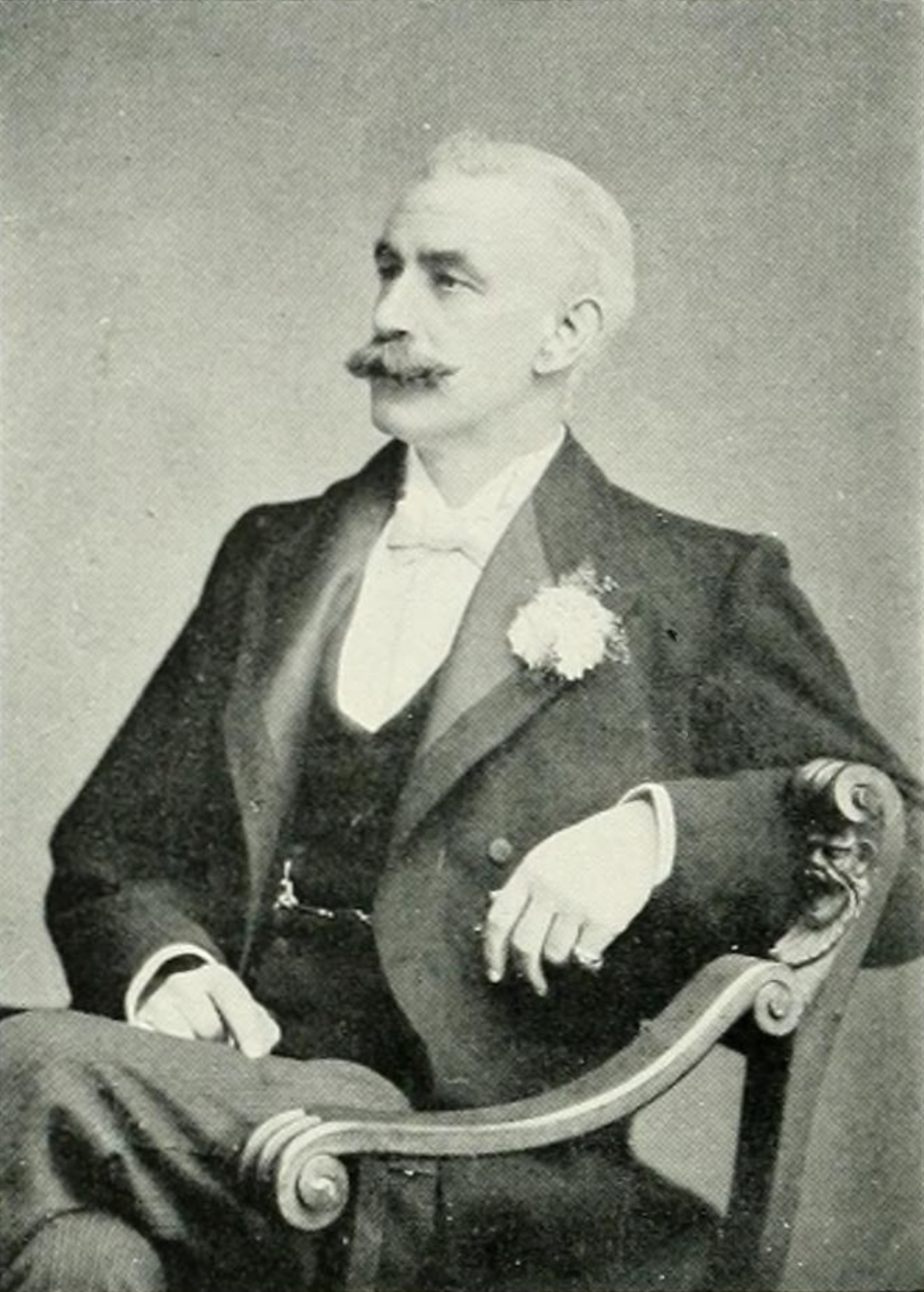
Nicholas Lane Jackson. Original caption: THE FOUNDER OF THE CORINTHIANS: MR. N. L. JACKSON. (Photo: Elliott &. Fry, Baker Street. W)

Nicholas Lane Jackson (1 November 1849 – 26 October 1937), known as N. L. Jackson and "Pa" Jackson, was an English sports administrator and author.

== Early life ==
Jackson was born in Hackney, London in 1849 to his father, also named Nicholas Lane Jackson, and mother Mary. The elder Jackson was a cattle salesman who had moved to the capital from Devon. In 1869, the younger Jackson married Mary Ann Williams. By 1871, the young married couple were living in Isleworth with two infant children and a servant, with Jackson's occupation listed as "land steward".

== Sports ==
=== Football ===
In 1877, Jackson founded Finchley F.C. (initially known as "Finchley Petrels"), also captaining the club. He soon started officiating matches, for example serving as umpire alongside C. W. Alcock in an F. A. Cup tie between Old Etonians and Minerva in January 1879.

In 1880, he was elected to the committee of the Football Association (FA). Between 1881 and 1883, he served as assistant secretary to the FA, working alongside Alcock. According to one source, although Alcock was the nominal secretary, "the burden of the work [was] borne by Jackson".

Jackson also founded Corinthian FC (1882) and the London Football Association (1882).

==== Professionalism ====
In January 1884, Jackson investigated allegations that Preston North End had offered financial inducements to attract Scottish players. As a result of Jackson's investigation, an FA committee voted to disqualify the Preston club from that season's FA Cup. At the FA's meeting in February 1884, Jackson successfully proposed that "this meeting considers the existence of veiled professionalism and the importation of players are serious evils calling for prompt attention" and called for the creation of a committee to study the matter. Jackson led the resulting committee, whose hardline anti-professionalism recommendations were adopted by the FA for the 1884–85 season.

In March 1885, when the question was once again considered by FA, Jackson supported a motion that "it is expedient to legalize professionalism". He served on the committee whose recommendations led to the FA allowing professionalism, with certain restrictions, in July of that year.

=== Tennis ===
Jackson contributed to the founding of the Lawn Tennis Association (1888). He was one of the most important referees at early tennis tournaments.

=== Golf ===
Jackson founded golf clubs at Le Touquet, Cabourg, and Stoke Poges (the last being the first country club in England). He continued to play the game into old age, allegedly having a handicap of 9 at the age of 82.

=== Other sports ===
Jackson gave his name to the "Lane-Jackson Championship", an important curling title in Switzerland. He invented a sport known as "ringoal", in which players used two sticks to throw a ring, which had to be caught by an opponent.

== Author ==
Jackson was a prolific author. He founded the tennis journal Pastime (1883) and the cricket periodical Cricket Field (1892), both of which were later purchased by The Field. His Association Football (1899) is an important source for the early history of that sport. He also edited reference works for football and rugby. His autobiography Sporting Days and Sporting Ways was published in 1932.

== Death ==
Jackson died in 1937 at the age of 87. He is said to have boasted that he weighed the same at the age of 80 as he did at 18 (10 stone 8.5 pounds). He also claimed to have never smoked or drunk alcohol.

== Works ==
- Alcock, C. W.; Jackson, N. L. (n.d.). The National Football Calendar for 1881. London.
- Jackson, N. L. (ed.), Pastime: the Lawn-Tennis Journal (from 1883)
- Jackson, Nick Lane (1887). The Athlete's Guide (second ed.). London: Simpkin, Marshall & co.
- Jackson, N. L. (1892). The Association Football Handbook 1892-3. London: Pastime.
- Jackson, N. L. (n.d.). The Association Football Handbook, 1894-5, 1895-6. London.
- Jackson, N. L. The Rugby Union Football handbook 1895/96. London: Cox.
- Jackson, N. L. (1899). Association Football. London: George Newnes Ltd.
- Jackson, N. L. (n.d.) [1931]. Always Fit and Well. London: George Newnes.
- Jackson, N. L. (1932). Sporting Days and Sporting Ways. London: Hurst & Blackett.
