= William Duckworth =

William Duckworth may refer to:

- Will Duckworth (1954), deputy leader of the Green Party of England and Wales
- William Duckworth (football manager) (fl. 1934–1946), Scottish professional football coach active in France
- William Duckworth (composer) (1943–2012), American composer
- William Duckworth (Canadian politician) (1884–1951), Ontario merchant and political figure
- William Duckworth (British politician) (1879–1952), British Member of Parliament for Manchester Moss Side, 1935–1945
- William Henry Duckworth (1894–1969), justice of the Supreme Court of Georgia

== See also ==
- Billy Duckworth (born 1959), Australian rules footballer
- Bill Duckworth (footballer, born 1918) (1918–2016), Australian rules footballer
