= Dyce Duckworth =

British physician and baronet

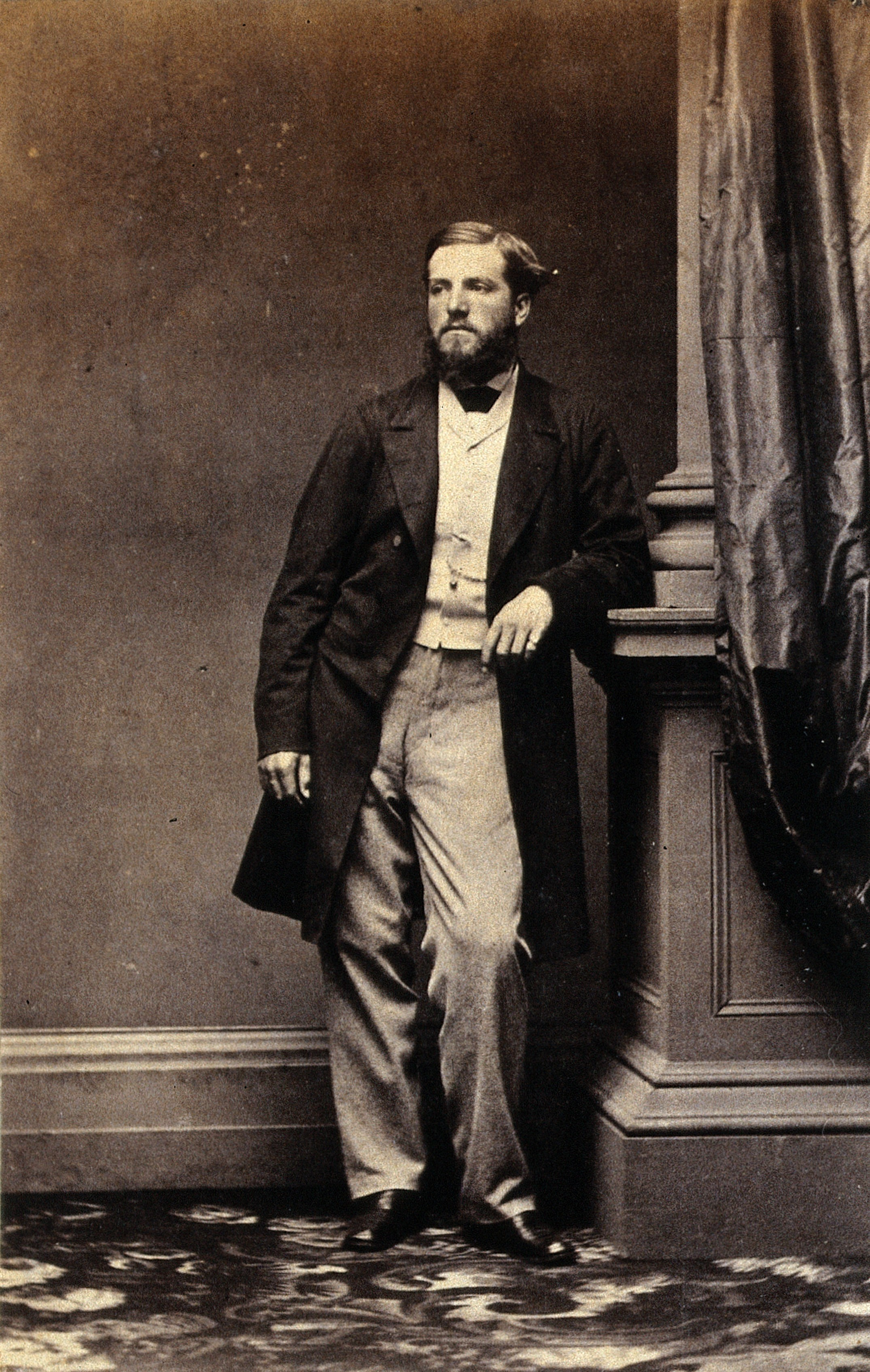
- Sir Dyce Duckworth. Photograph, 1863.
- Born: 24 November 1840; Liverpool, England
- Died: 20 January 1928 (aged 87); London, England
- Known for: A Treatise on Gout (1889)

Sir Dyce Duckworth, 1st Baronet FRCP FRCPI (24 November 1840 – 20 January 1928) was a British surgeon, physician, dermatologist, and author of A Treatise on Gout (1889), which was translated into French and German.

After education at the Royal Institution School, Liverpool, Dyce Duckworth studied medicine at the University of Edinburgh, graduating there in 1862 MB (Edin.). He gained an MD from the University of Edinburgh in 1863 with a thesis on the adrenal glands. From 1864 to 1865 he served in the Royal Naval Medical Service and was posted to the Royal Naval Hospital, Stonehouse. At St Bartholomew's Hospital, he was from 1865 to 1869 a medical tutor, from 1869 to 1883 an assistant physician, and from 1883 to 1906 a full physician, retiring as consultant physician in 1906. At St Bartholomew's Hospital, he was in charge of the skin department from 1870 to 1875, and he was a lecturer in medicine from 1890 to 1901. He was a senior physician to the Dreadnought Seamen's Hospital, Greenwich from 1906 until 1917.

In 1868 at the University of Edinburgh he graduated MD (Edin.) with a gold medal for his thesis. He was elected FRCP in 1870 and honorary FRCPI in 1887.

Duckworth delivered the Lumleian Lectures in 1896 and the Harveian Oration in 1898. From 1884 to 1923, he served as the treasurer of the Royal College of Physicians. He was knighted in 1886, and created a baronet in 1909. From 1890 to 1901, he was Honorary Physician to the Prince of Wales (who became King Edward VII in 1901).

Courtly, slow, quiet in manner, soft in speech and earnest in gesture, he was always correctly dressed in a frock-coat and top-hat ... In politics a Tory, by religion an Anglican and good Churchman, he did not suffer gladly the trend of modern manners.

He married his first wife in 1870. There were a son and two daughters from his first marriage. He married his second wife in 1890. There were two sons from his second marriage.

He was succeeded in the baronetcy by Sir Edward Dyce Duckworth, 2nd Bt. (1875–1945), who was employed by the Indian Civil Service as a judge in Burma.

== Selected publications ==
- A treatise on gout. 1889.
- The sequels of disease: being the Lumleian lectures delivered in the Royal College of Physicians, 1896; together with observations on prognosis in disease. 1896.
- The influence of character and right judgment in medicine: the Harveian oration delivered before the Royal College of Physicians, October 18, 1898. 1898.
- Views on some social subjects. 1915.

Baronetage of the United Kingdom
New creation	Baronet (of Grosvenor Place); 1909 – 1928	Succeeded by Edward Dyce Duckworth
