= Thomas E. Duckworth =

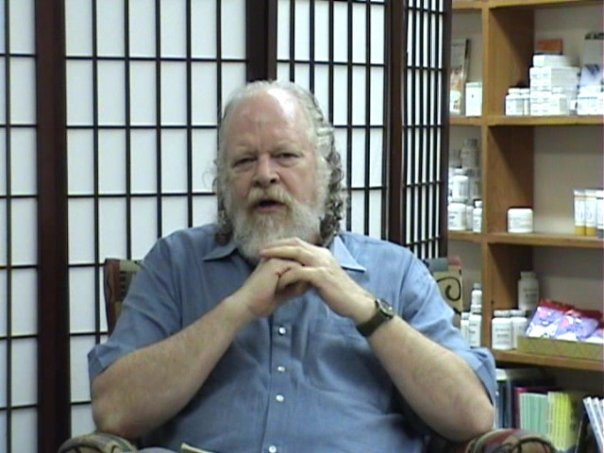
Thomas Emmet Duckworth

Thomas Emmett Duckworth (born February 14, 1942) is an American acupuncturist, founder and director of the Natural Life Therapy Clinic (1980), founder and executive director of the Institute of American Acupuncture and Life Medicine, and an international teacher of Japanese-style acupuncture and the Kototama Principle. He has provided public and professional instruction in Mexico, California, New Mexico, Michigan, New Jersey, Pennsylvania, Oklahoma and throughout Missouri for the past 35 years.

== Career ==
Dr. Duckworth was born in Boston, Massachusetts, and educated at the Kototama Institute (1977–1987), earning a Certification of Completion in 1980, a Diploma in 1982; and a Doctorate in Kototama Life Medicine in 1987. This was the only doctorate degree earned of the 107 graduates of the Kototama Institute. In 1980, he was invited by Dr. M. Masahilo Nakazono Osensei to join the teaching faculty at the Kototama Institute where he taught until the basic program ceased in 1985. In 1988 he became a licensed tutor in New Mexico. In 1986 he started the School of Inochi Resources in California, and he co-founded with M.M. Nakazono Osensei the Inochi International Studies Program in Mexico in 1987. Dr. Duckworth is an internationally known teacher of Kototama Life Medicine. He specializes in Kototama Pulse diagnosis, Pediatric acupuncture, 'Tama-touch', Kappo, women's medicine, and in Kototama Sound. He discovered the Kototama Pulse configuration (1982–1986) and created 'Tama-Touch', a tactile therapy of the Ki Kei Meridians in 2009. Dr. Duckworth's studies and practices over the past four decades have included traditional herbal and folk medicine of the Southwest, midwifery and emergency medical services. He has training in Hindu and Buddhist meditation, in Sufi dance, and he has studied the philosophy of Kototama for over 40 years, as a practitioner and teacher. He has been an Emergency Medical Technician Instructor, Red Cross First Aid Instructor, and CPR Instructor. Dr. Duckworth was founder of the New Mexico Association of Acupuncture and Oriental Medicine and served twice as its president, as well as the author of the New Mexico Acupuncture Practice Art, and was twice appointed by the Governor of New Mexico to serve on the New Mexico State Acupuncture Board. His certifications include NCCAOM, Licensed Acupuncturist (L.Ac.), and National Certification Commission for Acupuncture and Oriental Medicine.

== Recent published writings ==
Recently he has published several articles in the North American Journal of Oriental Medicine

- "Concerning Kototama Life Medicine and Merdian Therapy's Evolution"
- "Kappo: Giving Back Life"
- "Traditional Way, R.I.P."
- "Poems of the Student"
- "From Apprentice to Journeyman and Beyond"
- "Kyo and Jistu, Ho and Sha"
- "Kototama Inochi Meridian Therapy: Procedures and Protocols".

Natural Medicine from the Kitchen, Amazon ebook, published 2016 Natural Medicine from the Kitchen, Amazon Publishing All proceeds from sales are paid to the Institute of American Acupuncture & Life Medicine; a non-profit organization established in 2002 to serve the health needs of those not being served.

=== Personal life ===
He currently resides in St. Louis, Missouri where he lives with his wife. Dr. Duckworth has 6 biological children, and 4 stepchildren, all fully grown, as well as 19 grandchildren. His practice, Natural Life Therapy Clinic, is a "family-centered service".
