= Carl W. Duckworth =

American politician (1955–2018)

Member of the Utah House of Representatives from the 22nd district
- In office 1999–2008
- Preceded by: Dan Tuttle
- Succeeded by: Susan Duckworth

Personal details
- Born: January 25, 1955 Salt Lake City, Utah, U.S.
- Died: May 1, 2018 (aged 63) Magna, Utah, U.S.
- Party: Democratic Party
- Spouse: Susan Duckworth
- Education: Cyprus High School, Magna, Utah
- Occupation: Heavy Equipment Operator (Kennecott Utah Copper) 34 years, ret., Utah State House of Representatives

Carl William Duckworth (January 25, 1955 – May 1, 2018) was an American politician. A Democrat, he served in the Utah State House of Representatives where he represented the 22nd District in Magna, Utah, from 1999 to 2008. He retired after being diagnosed (in late 2007) with multiple myeloma, an abnormal blood cell cancer.

Duckworth was born in Salt Lake City, Utah. Duckworth was a Latter-day Saint. He held a bachelor's degree from Boise State University. He also went to College of Eastern Utah and took electrical apprentice courses at the Salt Lake Community College. Duckworth was a heavy equipment operator.

Duckworth died of cancer on May 1, 2018, at the age of 63.
