= Susan Duckworth =

American politician

Member of the Utah House of Representatives from the 22nd district
- Incumbent
- Assumed office January 1, 2009
- Preceded by: Carl W. Duckworth

Personal details
- Party: Democratic
- Spouse: Carl W. Duckworth
- Education: Salt Lake Community College; University of Utah
- Website: suefor22.net

Susan 'Sue' D. Duckworth is an American politician and a Democratic member of the Utah House of Representatives representing District 22 since January 1, 2009. She was married to former Democratic Representative Carl W. Duckworth, whom she succeeded, until his death in May, 2018.

== Early life and career ==
Born in Magna, Utah, Duckworth attended Salt Lake Community College and the University of Utah. She works as a caregiver and lives in Magna, Utah with her husband Carl. She is the mother of four children.

== Political career ==
2014 Duckworth was unopposed for the June 24, 2014 Democratic primary. She faced Republican nominee William "Bill" Both and the Constitution party nominee Marilee Roose in the general election on November 4, 2014. Duckworth won with 2,709 votes (51.6%).

2012 Duckworth was unopposed for the June 26, 2012, Democratic primary and won the November 6, 2012 general election with 6,402 votes (73.3%) against Constitution nominee Marilee Roose, who had run for the seat in 2006.

2010 Duckworth was unopposed for the June 22, 2010, Democratic primary and won the November 2, 2010 general election with 3,334 votes (52.1%) against Republican nominee Noel Fields.

2008 When District 22 Democratic Representative Carl Duckworth left the Legislature and left the seat open, Duckworth was selected from three candidates by the Democratic convention and won the November 4, 2008 general election with 6,600 votes (76.2%) against Constitution candidate Thomas Mangum.

During the 2016 legislative session, Duckworth served on the Natural Resources, Agriculture, and Environmental Quality Appropriations Subcommittee, the House Business and Labor Committee, as well as the House Natural Resources, Agriculture and Environment Committee.

== 2016 sponsored legislation ==
Bill number	Bill title	Status
HB0202	Hygiene Tax Act	House/ filed - 3/10/2016
HB0203	Continuing Education Hours Amendments	House/ filed - 3/10/2016
HB0322S01	State Building Designation	Governor signed - 3/23/2016

Duckworth passed one of the three bills she proposed, giving her a 33% passage rate. She did not floor sponsor any Senate bills.
