= Duckworth, West Virginia =

Unincorporated community in West Virginia, United States

- Unincorporated community
- Location within West Virginia Location within the United States
- Coordinates: 39°16′38″N 80°52′34″W
- Country: United States
- State: West Virginia
- County: Doddridge
- Elevation: 896 ft (273 m)
- Time zone: UTC-5 (Eastern (EST))
  - Summer (DST): UTC-4 (EDT)
- Area codes: 304 & 681
- GNIS feature ID: 1554332

Duckworth is an unincorporated community in Doddridge County, West Virginia, United States. Duckworth is 5 miles (8.0 km) east of Pennsboro.
