= Sassoon baronets of Kensington Gore and of Eastern Terrace (1890) =

The Sassoon baronetcy, of Kensington Gore in London and of Eastern Terrace in Brighton, was created in the Baronetage of the United Kingdom on 22 March 1890 for the Anglo-Iraqi businessman Albert (formerly Abdullah) Sassoon. He was the son of David Sassoon of the Sassoon family, of Baghdadi Jewish descent. Naturalised at Bombay (now Mumbai) in the British Raj, he succeeded his father as head of the banking firm David Sassoon & Co.. He became a Companion of the Star of India in 1867, in 1868 joined the Bombay Legislative Council, and was knighted in 1873.

The 2nd Baronet, Sir Edward Sassoon, represented Hythe as a Member of Parliament from May 1899 until his death in 1912.

The 3rd Baronet, Sir Philip Sassoon, was a British politician, art collector and social host, who represented Hythe in the House of Commons from 1912. He served as Under-Secretary of State for Air from 1924 to 1929 and again from 1931 to 1937, and First Commissioner of Works in 1937. He was appointed Privy Councillor in 1929. On his death in 1939, the baronetcy became extinct.

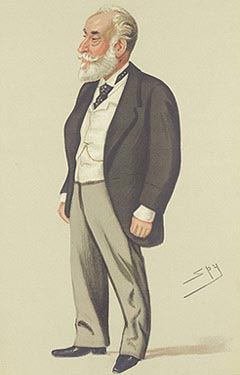
Illustration of Albert Sassoon from Vanity Fair, 16 August 1879

== Sassoon baronets, of Kensington Gore and of Eastern Terrace (1890) ==
- Sir Albert Abdullah David Sassoon, 1st Baronet (25 July 1818 – 24 October 1896)
- Sir Edward Albert Sassoon, 2nd Baronet (20 June 1856 – 24 May 1912)
- Sir Philip Albert Gustave David Sassoon, 3rd Baronet (4 December 1888 – 3 June 1939), left no heir.

== Notes ==
Baronetage of the United Kingdom
Preceded by Mackenzie baronets	Sassoon baronets of Kensington Gore and of Eastern Terrace; 22 March 1890	Succeeded by Savory baronets

}
