= Savory baronets =

Set index for Savory baronets

Two baronetcies for the surname Savory were created in the Baronetage of the United Kingdom. Both are now extinct.

- Savory baronets of The Woodlands (1890)
- Savory baronets of Buckhurst Park (1891): see Sir Joseph Savory, 1st Baronet (1843–1921)
