= John Duckworth (physicist) =

British physicist

John Clifford Duckworth FREng
- Born: 27 December 1916; London, England
- Died: 8 January 2015 (aged 98)
- Education: Wadham College, Oxford
- Occupation: Physicist

John Duckworth FREng (27 December 1916 – 8 January 2015) was a British physicist known for his involvement in the development of Britain's radar defence network during World War II. He also served as the director of the National Research Development Corporation (NRDC), and helped supervise Britain's efforts to develop nuclear technology in the 1950s. Duckworth worked as an industrial consultant in his later life.

== Early life and education ==
John Clifford Duckworth was born in east London in 1916, the son of an entrepreneur who owned companies that manufactured batteries and radium-based cosmetics. Duckworth attended King's College School, Wimbledon, before going to study physics at Wadham College, Oxford, where he was captain of the college tennis team. After graduating with a first-class honours degree, Duckworth worked as a researcher in nuclear physics at Oxford's Clarendon Laboratory, but was recruited by the Air Ministry Research Establishment (AMRE) upon the outbreak of war in 1939.

== Wartime radar work ==
During his time with AMRE, Duckworth was involved in the enhancement of the British air defence radar network, helping to develop and install new radar transmitters capable of detecting low-flying enemy aircraft. Later in the war, when British naval convoys came under attack from German bombers, Duckworth worked on developing radar systems for merchant shipping, and also helped create a multi-station ground-based radar interception system for the Royal Air Force. When Germany began using V-1 flying bombs against British cities in 1944, Duckworth helped improve the RAF's radar cover to allow fighter aircraft to intercept the fast-moving V-1s.

== Postwar career ==
After World War II, Duckworth briefly worked in Canada before joining the Atomic Energy Research Establishment (AERE) at Harwell, Oxfordshire, supervising the construction of the facility's linear particle accelerator. Thereafter, he joined the electronics company Ferranti, working on the development of the Bloodhound guided missile. In 1955, the British government appointed Duckworth the overseer of the bidding process for the construction of Britain's first nuclear reactors. In 1959, Duckworth became the managing director of the National Research Development Corporation (NRDC), a post he held for 11 years. Among the NRDC projects he oversaw was the development of the highly successful antibiotic cephalosporin. After retiring from the NRDC, Duckworth worked for many years as an industrial consultant, and served on the boards of several companies.

== Personal life ==
In 1942, Duckworth married Dorothy Wills, who predeceased him. The couple were survived by their three sons.
