= Duckworth baronets =

Set index for Duckworth baronets

There have been two baronetcies created for persons with the surname Duckworth, both in the Baronetage of the United Kingdom.

- Duckworth baronets of Topsham (1813)
- Duckworth baronets of Grosvenor Place (1909)

== See also ==
- Duckworth-King baronets
