= List of extinct baronetcies =

Peerages and baronetcies of Britain and Ireland
Extant	All
Dukes	Dukedoms
Marquesses	Marquessates
Earls	Earldoms
Viscounts	Viscountcies
Barons	Baronies
Baronets	Baronetcies
En, Ire, NS, GB, UK (extinct)

The following extinct baronetcies are listed by date of extinction. An alphabetical list is to be found here, or via the category of extinct baronetcies.

== Reign of King James I ==
=== 1613 ===
- St Paul of Snarford (cr. 1611), extinct with the grantee's death on 18 October 1613.

=== 1621 ===
- Biggs of Lenchwick (cr. 26 May 1620), extinct with the grantee's death on 11 June 1621.

=== 1622 ===
- Clere of Ormesby (cr. 26 February 1621), extinct with the grantee's death.

=== 1623 ===
- Ashby of Harefield (cr. 18 June 1622), extinct with the grantee's death.
- Forster of Bamburgh (cr. 6 March 1620), extinct with the grantee's death.

=== 1624 ===
- Courten of Aldington (cr. 18 May 1622), extinct with the grantee's death.

== Reign of King Charles I ==
=== 1626 ===
- Mildmay of Moulsham (cr. 29 June 1611), extinct with the grantee's death.

=== 1627 ===
- Alen of St Wolstens (cr. 7 June 1622), extinct with the grantee's death on 7 March 1627.

=== 1628 ===
- Ashley of Wimbourne (cr. 3 July 1622), extinct with the grantee's death on 13 January 1628.
- Harries of Tong Castle (cr. 6 April 1623), extinct with the grantee's death on 18 February 1628.
- Morrison of Cashiobury (cr. 29 June 1611), extinct with the grantee's death on 20 August 1628.

=== 1629 ===
- Frere of Walter Eaton (cr. 22 July 1620), extinct with the grantee's death.
- Wilmot of Witney (cr. 1 October 1621), extinct with the grantee's death.

=== 1630 ===
- Anderson of St Ives (cr. 3 January 1629), extinct with the grantee's death.
- Berkeley of Wymondham (cr. 29 June 1611), extinct with the grantee's death.
- Blakiston of the manor of Blakiston (cr. 27 May 1615), extinct with the grantee's death.
- Slingsby of Scriven (cr. 2 March 1628), extinct with the grantee's death.

=== 1631 ===
- Bamburgh of Howsham (cr. 1 December 1619), extinct with the death of the third baronet.
- Beaumont of Whitley (cr. 15 August 1628), extinct with the grantee's death on 28 October 1631.
- Bennet of Bechampton (cr. 17 July 1627), extinct with the grantee's death on 21 August 1631.
- Wentworth of Gosfield (cr. 29 June 1611), extinct with the grantee's death.

=== 1636 ===
- Wilson of Kilenure (cr. 3 July 1629), extinct with the grantee's death.

=== 1638 ===
- Bayning of Bentley Parva (cr. 24 September 1611), extinct with the death of the second baronet.
- Leigh of Tyrone (cr. February 1622), extinct with the death of the second baronet.

=== 1640 ===
- Foljambe of Walton (cr. 24 July 1622), extinct with the grantee's death on 17 December 1640.

=== 1641 ===
- Chaloner of Guisborough (cr. 20 June 1620), extinct with the grantee's death.

=== 1642 ===
- Dixwell of Tirlingham (cr. 27 February 1628), extinct with the grantee's death.
- Enyon of Flowrie (cr. 8 April 1642), extinct with the grantee's death.

=== 1643 ===
- Bedell of Hamerton (cr. 3 June 1622), extinct with the grantee's death on 14 December 1643.
- Crane of Chilton (cr. 11 May 1627), extinct with the grantee's death in February 1643.
- Fitton of Gawsworth (cr. 2 October 1617), extinct with the death of the second baronet.
- Pennyman of Marske (cr. 6 May 1628), extinct with the grantee's death on 22 August 1643.

=== 1644 ===
- Dawnay of Cowick (cr. 19 May 1642), extinct with the death of the second baronet.
- Jones of Albemarlis (cr. 25 July 1643), extinct with the grantee's death.
- Vavasour of Killingthorpe (cr. 22 June 1631), extinct with the grantee's death.

=== 1645 ===
- Crane of Woodrising (cr. 20 March 1643), extinct with the grantee's death.
- Dalison of Laughton (cr. 29 June 1611), extinct with the death of the second baronet.
- Elphinstone of Elphinstone (cr. 20 June 1628), extinct with the grantee's death.

=== 1647 ===
- Gurney of London (cr. 14 December 1641), extinct with the grantee's death on 6 October 1647.

=== 1648 ===
- Knollys of Grove Place (cr. 6 May 1642), extinct with the grantee's death.

== Interregnum (Commonwealth) ==
=== 1650 ===
- Bellingham of Hilsington (cr. 30 May 1620), extinct with the death of the second baronet on 26 October 1650.
- Carleton of Holcombe (cr. 28 May 1627), extinct with the death of the second baronet.

=== 1651 ===
- Acton of the City of London (cr. 30 May 1629), extinct with the grantee's death on 22 January 1651.
- Campbell of Ardnamurchan and Airds (cr. 23 December 1628), extinct with the grantee's death.

=== 1652 ===
- Cottington of Hanworth (cr. 19 June 1652), extinct with the grantee's death.

=== 1653 ===
- Powell of Pengethly (cr. 18 January 1622), extinct with the grantee's death.

=== 1655 ===
- Constable of Flamborough (cr. 29 June 1611), extinct with the grantee's death on 15 June 1655.

=== 1656 ===
- Fowler of Islington (cr. 21 May 1628), extinct with the grantee's death.
- Nicolson of Cockburnspath (cr. 17 December 1625), extinct with the grantee's death.

=== 1657 ===
- Aylesbury of London (cr. 19 April 1627), extinct with the grantee's death.
- Boteler of Hatfield Woodhall (cr. 12 April 1620), extinct with the death of the second baronet.

=== 1659 ===
- Astley of Melton Constable (cr. 21 January 1642), extinct with the grantee's death on 7 September 1659.
- Pate of Sysonby (cr. 28 October 1643), extinct with the grantee's death/
- Style of Beckenham (cr. 13 September 1624), extinct with the grantee's death on 10 November 1659.
- Vavasour of Copmanthorpe (cr. 17 July 1643), extinct with the grantee's death.

== Reign of King Charles II ==
=== 1660 ===
- Juxon of Albourne, Sussex (cr. 28 December 1660), extinct with the death of the second baronet.

=== 1661 ===
- Baker of Sisinghurst, Kent (cr. 29 June 1611), extinct with the death of the third baronet.
- Corbet of Sprowston (cr. 4 July 1623), extinct with the death of the third baronet.
- Peyton of Doddington (cr. 10 December 1660), extinct with the grantee's death.
- Slingsby of Newcells, Hertfordshire (cr. 16 March 1660), extinct with the grantee's death on 26 October 1661.

=== 1662 ===
- Abdy of Moores (cr. 22 June 1660), extinct with the grantee's death.
- Cambell of Woodford (cr. 9 April 1661), extinct with the grantee's death.
- Gifford of Castle Jordan (cr. 4 March 1661), extinct with the grantee's death.

=== 1663 ===
- Gilmour of Edinburgh (cr. 16 August 1661), extinct with the grantee's death.

=== 1664 ===
- Crofts of Stow (cr. 16 March 1661), extinct with the grantee's death.
- Gould of the City of London (cr. 13 June 1660), extinct with the grantee's death.
- Tufton of Vintners (cr. 18 January 1623), extinct with the death of the third baronet.

=== 1665 ===
- Hyde of Albury (cr. 8 November 1621), extinct with the death of the second baronet.
- Mosley of Rolleston (cr.10 July 1640), extinct with the death of the second baronet on 14 February 1665.

=== 1667 ===
- Kempe of Pentlow (cr. 5 February 1627), extinct with the grantee's death.
- Lucas of Fenton (cr. 20 May 1644), extinct with the grantee's death.

=== 1668 ===
- Airmine of Osgodby (cr. 28 November 1619), extinct with the death of the third baronet.
- Buswell of Clipston (cr. 7 July 1660), extinct with the grantee's death.
- Hastings of Redlinch (cr. 7 May 1667), extinct with the grantee's death.
- Herbert of Bromfield (cr. 18 December 1660), extinct with the grantee's death.
- Pope of Wilcote (cr. 29 June 1611), extinct with the death of the fourth baronet.

=== 1669 ===
- Backhouse of London (cr. 9 November 1660), extinct with the grantee's death.
- Boothby of Friday Hill (cr. 9 November 1660), extinct with the death of the second baronet.
- Drake of Shardeloes (cr. 17 July 1641), extinct with the grantee's death on 28 August 1669.
- Dyer of Staughton (cr. 8 June 1627), extinct with the grantee's death.
- Williams of Minster (cr. 22 April 1642), extinct with the grantee's death.

=== 1670 ===
- Cutts of Childerley (cr. 21 June 1660), extinct with the granteee's death.
- Newton of London (cr. 25 January 1661), extinct with the grantee's death.
- Wright of Dennington (cr. 7 February 1646), extinct with the grantee's death.

=== 1671 ===
- Evelyn of Godstone, Surrey (cr. 29 May 1660), extinct with the grantee's death on 10 August 1671.
- Fenton of Mitchelstown (cr. 22 July 1661), extinct with the death of the second baronet.
- Greene of Mitcham (cr. 2 November 1664), extinct with the grantee's death.
- Lewis of Ledstone (cr. 15 October 1660), extinct with the grantee's death.
- Seton of Windygowl (cr. 24 January 1671), extinct with the grantee's death.
- Widdrington of Cartington (cr. 8 August 1642), extinct with the grantee's death.
- Willoughby of Willoughby (cr. 4 August 1660), extinct with the grantee's death.

=== 1672 ===
- Diggs of Chilham Castle (cr. 6 March 1666), extinct with the grantee's death.

=== 1673 ===
- Middleton of Leighton Hall (cr. 24 June 1642), extinct with the grantee's death.

=== 1674 ===
- Brereton of Hanford (cr. 10 March 1627), extinct with the death of the second baronet.
- Charlton of Hesleyside (cr. 6 March 1645), extinct with the grantee's death.
- Harby of Aldenham (cr. 17 July 1660), extinct with the death of the second baronet.
- Lake of Carnow (cr. 10 July 1661), extinct with the grantee's death.
- Lloyd of Woking (cr. 28 February 1662), extinct with the death of the second baronet.
- Temple baronets (cr. 7 July 1662), extinct with the grantee's death on 27 March 1674.

=== 1675 ===
- Ferrers of Skellingthorpe (cr. 19 December 1628), extinct with the death of the second baronet.
- Hendley of Cuckfield (cr. 8 April 1661), extinct with the grantee's death.

=== 1676 ===
- Braham of New Windsor (cr. 16 April 1662), extinct with the grantee's death.
- Denny of Gillingham (cr. 3 June 1642), extinct with the grantee's death.
- Dycer of Uphall (cr. 18 March 1661), extinct with the death of the third baronet.
- Green of Sampford (cr. 26 July 1660), extinct with the grantee's death.

=== 1677 ===
- Hele of Fleet (cr. 28 May 1627), extinct with the death of the third baronet.
- Lewis of Llangorse (cr. 14 September 1628), extinct with the grantee's death.

=== 1678 ===
- Modyford of London (cr. 16 February 1661), extinct with the death of the second baronet.
- Monins of Waldershare (cr. 29 June 1611), extinct with the death of the third baronet.
- Moore of Mayds Morton (cr. 26 July 1665), extinct with the grantee's death.

=== 1679 ===
- Bovey of Hillfields (cr. 30 August 1660). extinct with the grantee's death on 11 October 1679.
- Covert of Slaugham (cr. 2 July 1660), extinct with the grantee's death on 11 March 1679.
- Ley of Westbury (cr. 20 July 1619), extinct with the death of the fourth baronet.
- Valckenburg of Middleing (cr. 20 July 1642), extinct with the death of the second baronet.

=== 1680 ===
- Ball of Mamhead (cr. 22 July 1672), extinct with the grantee's death.
- Bowyer of Leighthorne, Sussex (cr. 23 July 1627), extinct with the death of the third baronet.
- Greaves of St Leonard's Forest (cr. 6 May 1645), extinct with the grantee's death on 11 November 1680.
- Leventhorpe of Shingey Hall (cr. 30 May 1622), extinct with the death of the fifth baronet.
- Powell of Pengethly (cr. 23 January 1661), extinct with the grantee's death on 2 December 1680.
- Williams of Marnhull (cr. 19 April 1642), extinct with the death of the second baronet.

=== 1681 ===
- Leke of Newark on Trent (cr. 15 December 1663), extinct with the death of the second baronet.
- Wright of Dagenham (cr. 11 June 1660), extinct with the death of the second baronet.

=== 1682 ===
- Hamilton of Monilla (cr. 6 April 1682), extinct with the grantee's death.

=== 1683 ===
- Badd of Cames Oysells (cr. 28 February 1643); extinct with the death of the 1st baronet 10 June 1683.
- Fortescue of Fallapit (cr. 31 March 1664), extinct with the death of the second baronet.

=== 1684 ===
- Beale of Maidstone (cr. 16 October 1660), extinct with the grantee's death.
- Cockayne of Ashbourne (cr. 10 January 1642), extinct with the grantee's death.
- More of Loseley (cr. 18 May 1642), extinct with the death of the second baronet.
- Peyton of Knowlton (cr. 29 June 1611), extinct with the death of the second baronet on 11 February 1684.

== Reign of King James II ==
=== 1685 ===
- Bacon of Gillingham (cr. 7 February 1662); extinct with the death of the 3rd baronet 8 October 1685. (earlier related Bacon Baronetcies of Redgrave and Mildenhall remain extant)
- Bulkeley of Dunlaven (cr. 9 December 1672), extinct with the grantee's death on 17 March 1685.
- Harris of Stowford (cr. 1 December 1673), extinct with the grantee's death on 20 February 1685.
- Tufton of The Mote (cr. 24 December 1641), extinct with the death of the second baronet on 11 October 1685.

=== 1686 ===
- Beaumont of Grace Dieu (cr. 31 January 1627), extinct with the death of the third baronet.
- Harris of Stowford (cr. 1 December 1673), extinct with the grantee's death.

=== 1687 ===
- Colclough of Tintern Abbey (cr. 21 July 1628), extinct with the death of the third baronet.
- Foote of London (cr. 21 November 1660), extinct with the grantee's death on 12 October 1687.
- Norton of Rotherfield (cr. 18 May 1622), extinct with the death of the third baronet on 9 January 1687.

=== 1688 ===
- Bindlosse of Barwick (cr. 16 June 1641), extinct with the grantee's death on 6 November 1688.

== Reign of King William III & Mary II ==
=== 1690 ===
- Berkeley of Bruton (cr. 2 July 1660), extinct with the grantee's death on 13 June 1690.
- Browne of Betchworth Castle (cr. 7 July 1622), extinct with the death of the second baronet.
- Evans of Kilcrene (cr. 19 February 1683), extinct with the grantee's death.
- Phelipps of Barrington (cr. 16 February 1620), extinct with the death of the fourth baronet.
- Portman of Orchard (cr. 25 November 1611), extinct with the death of the sixth baronet on 18 March 1690.
- Yate of Buckland (cr. 30 July 1622), extinct with the death of the fourth baronet.

=== 1691 ===
- Neale of Wollaston (cr. 26 February 1646), extinct with the grantee's death.
- Norton of Coventry (cr. 23 July 1661), extinct with the grantee's death.
- Talbot of Carton (cr. 4 February 1623), extinct with the death of the third baronet.
- Thomson of Duddingston (cr. 20 February 1636), extinct with the death of the third baronet.
- Ward of Killagh (cr. 9 December 1682), extinct with the grantee's death.

=== 1692 ===
- Evelyn of Long Ditton, Surrey (cr. 17 February 1683), extinct with the grantee's death on 3 May 1692.
- Fowell of Fowellscombe (cr. 30 April 1661), extinct with the death of the third baronet on 26 November 1692.
- Roberts of Bow (cr. 2 February 1681), extinct with the grantee's death.

=== 1693 ===
- Harris of Boreatton (cr. 22 December 1622), extinct with the death of the seventh baronet.

=== 1694 ===
- Pryse of Gogarthen (cr. 9 August 1641), extinct with the death of the fourth baronet.

== Reign of King William III ==
=== 1695 ===
- Barkham of South Acre (cr. 26 June 1623), extinct with the death of the third baronet on 28 December 1695.
- Carr of Sleaford (cr. 29 June 1611), extinct with the death of the fifth baronet.
- North of Mildenhall (cr. 16 June 1660), extinct with the death of the second baronet.

=== 1696 ===
- Allin of Blundeston (cr. 7 February 1673), extinct with the death of the second baronet.
- Andrews of Lathbury (cr. 27 May 1661), extinct with the grantee's death.
- Assheton of Lever (cr. 28 June 1620), extinct with the death of the fourth baronet.
- Williams of Vaynol (cr. 15 June 1622), extinct with the death of the sixth baronet on 23 December 1696.

=== 1697 ===
- Earle of Craglethorpe (cr. 2 July 1629), extinct with the death of the fourth baronet.
- Eaton of Dunmoylin, County Limerick (cr. 21 February 1682), extinct with the grantee's death on 16 December 1697.
- Fenwick of Fenwick (cr. 9 June 1628), extinct with the death of the third baronet on 28 January 1697.
- Maculloch of Myrston (cr. 10 August 1664), extinct with the death of the second baronet.
- Plomer of the Inner Temple (cr. 4 January 1661), extinct on the grantee's death.

=== 1698 ===
- Darcy of St Osith's (cr. 19 June 1660), extinct with the death of the second baronet.
- Lort of Stackpoole Court (cr. 15 July 1662), extinct with the death of the third baronet.
- Norris of Speke (cr. 3 December 1698), extinct with the grantee's death.
- Roberts of Willesdon (cr. 4 October 1661), extinct with the death of the second baronet.

=== 1699 ===
- Anderson of Penley (cr. 3 July 1643), extinct with the death of the second baronet.
- Banks of London (cr. 25 July 1661), extinct with the grantee's death on 18 October 1699.
- Bellingham of Dubber (cr. 18 March 1667), extinct with the death of the second baronet.
- Cambell of Clay Hall (cr. 12 February 1664), extinct with the death of the third baronet.
- Kendrick of Whitley (cr. 29 March 1679), extinct with the death of the second baronet.
- Knyvett of Buckenham (cr. 22 May 1611), extinct with the death of the second baronet.
- Morton of Milbourne St Andrew (cr. 1 March 1619), extinct with the death of the second baronet.
- Temple of Sheen (cr. 31 January 1666), extinct with the grantee's death on 27 January 1699.
- Whitmore of Apley (cr. 28 June 1641), extinct with the death of the second baronet on 30 March 1699.

=== 1700 ===
- Grimston of Bradfield (cr. 26 November 1611), extinct with the death of the third baronet.
- Holman of Banbury (cr. 1 June 1663), extinct with the grantee's death.
- Lloyd of Yale (cr. 21 June 1647), extinct with the death of the second baronet.

=== 1701 ===
- Bennet of Babraham (cr. 22 November 1660), extinct with the death of the third baronet.
- Cookes of Norgrove (cr. 24 December 1664), extinct with the death of the second baronet on 8 June 1701.
- Pollard of King's Nympton (cr. 31 May 1627), extinct with the death of the third baronet.

== Reign of Queen Anne ==
=== 1702 ===
- Norris of Speke (cr. 3 December 1698), extinct with the grantee's death on 10 October 1702.

=== 1703 ===
- Draper of Sunninghill (cr. 9 June 1660), extinct with the grantee's death.
- Walker of Bushey Hall (cr. 28 January 1680), extinct with the death of the second baronet.

=== 1704 ===
- Cordell of Long Melford (cr. 22 June 1660), extinct with the third baronet on 8 May 1704.

=== 1705 ===
- Forster of East Greenwich (cr. 11 July 1661), extinct with the death of the second baronet.
- Halkett baronets (cr. 25 January 1662); extinct with the death of the 2nd baronet in March 1705.
- Killigrew of Arwennick (cr. 22 December 1660), extinct with the death of the second baronet on 8 January 1705.
- Oldfield of Spalding (cr. 6 August 1660), extinct with the death of the second baronet.
- Paylor of Thoralby (cr. 28 June 1642), extinct with the death of the second baronet.
- Penyston of Leigh (cr. 24 September 1611), extinct with the death of the fourth baronet.
- Pickering of Whaddon (cr. 2 January 1661), extinct with the death of the second baronet on 7 May 1705.
- Shirley of Preston (cr. 6 March 1666), extinct with the death of the third baronet.

=== 1706 ===
- Crowe of Llanherne (cr. 8 July 1627), extinct with the death of the second baronet.
- Duncombe of Tangley Park (cr. 4 February 1662), extinct with the death of the second baronet.
- Grey of Chillingham (C 15 June 1619), extinct with the death of the fourth baronet.
- Kniveton of Mercaston (cr. 29 June 1611), extinct with the death of the fourth baronet.
- Mayney of Linton (cr. 29 June 1641), extinct with the death of the second baronet.
- Meux of Kingston (cr. 11 December 1641), extinct with the death of the third baronet.
- Russell of Wytley (cr. 12 March 1627), extinct with the death of the second baronet on 24 January 1706.
- Thomas of Folkington (cr. 23 July 1660), extinct with the grantee's death on 18 November 1706.
- Thorold of Hough-on-the-Hill (cr. 14 June 1644), extinct with the death of the third baronet.

=== 1707 ===
- Barker of Hambleton (cr. 9 September 1655), extinct with the second baronet.
- Narborough of Knowlton (cr. 15 November 1688), extinct with the grantee's death

=== 1708 ===
- Appleton of South Benfleet (cr. 29 June 1611), extinct with the death of the sixth baronet.
- Cooke of Brome Hall (cr. 29 June 1663), extinct with the death of the second baronet.
- Graham of Gartmore (cr. 28 June 1665), extinct with the death of the second baronet.
- Matthews of Gobions (cr. 15 Jun 1662), extinct with the death of the second baronet.

=== 1709 ===
- Colbrand of Boreham (cr. 21 December 1621), extinct with the death of the fifth baronet.
- Copley of Sprotbrough, Yorks (cr. 17 June 1661), extinct with the death of the second baronet on 9 April 1709.
- Fuller of the Inner Temple (cr. 1 August 1687), extinct with the grantee's death.
- Humble of Kensington (cr. 16 March 1687), extinct with the grantee's death.
- Preston of Furness (cr. 1 April 1644), extinct with the death of the third baronet.
- Ramsay of Abbotshall (cr. 23 June 1669), extinct with the death of the second baronet.

=== 1710 ===
- Godolphin of Godolphin (cr. 29 April 1661), extinct with the grantee's death on 27 August 1710.
- Kennedy of Newtownmountkennedy (cr. 25 January 1666), extinct with the death of the fourth baronet.
- Long of Whaddon (C 26 March 1661), extinct with the death of the second baronet on 21 May 1710.

=== 1711 ===
- Barkham of Wainflete (cr. 21 July 1661), extinct with the death of the third baronet on 13 September 1711.
- Bruce of Balcaskie (cr. 21 October 1668), extinct with the death of the second baronet on 19 March 1711.
- Forster of Aldermaston (cr. 20 May 1620), extinct with the death of the second baronet in December 1711.

=== 1712 ===
- Barnardiston of Brightwell (cr. 11 May 1663), extinct with the death of the fourth baronet.
- Button of Alton (cr. 18 March 1622), extinct with the death of the fourth baronet.
- Drury of Riddlesworth (cr. 7 May 1627), extinct with the death of the third baronet.
- Fletcher of Hutton le Forest (cr. 19 February 1641), extinct with the death of the third baronet on 19 May 1712.
- Gorges of Langford (cr. 25 November 1611), extinct with the death of the second baronet in September 1712.
- Herbert of Derrogh (cr. 4 December 1630), extinct with the death of the third baronet.
- Hooke of Flanchford (cr. 22 July 1662), extinct with the death of the second baronet.
- Nevill of Holt (cr. 25 May 1661), extinct with the grantee's death.
- Peshall of Horsley (cr. 25 November 1611), extinct with the death of the third baronet.

=== 1713 ===
- Craven of Spersholt (cr. 4 June 1661), extinct with the grantee's death.
- Cropley of Clerkenwell (cr. 7 May 1661), extinct with the death of the second baronet on 22 October 1713.
- Mauleverer of Allerton (cr. 4 August 1641), extinct with the death of the fifth baronet.

=== 1714 ===
- Denton of Hillersdon (cr. 12 May 1699), extinct with the grantee's death on 4 May 1714.
- Seymour of Langley (cr. 4 July 1681), extinct with the grantee's death.

== Reign of King George I ==
=== 1715 ===
- Carteret of St Owen (cr. 4. June 1670), extinct with the death of the third baronet.
- Golding of Colston Bassett (cr. 27 September 1642), extinct with the death of the third baronet.

=== 1716 ===
- Blakiston of Gibside (cr. 30 July 1642), extinct with the death of the third baronet.
- Gerard of Harrow on the Hill, Middlesex (cr. 12 April 1620), extinct with the death of the fifth baronets.
- Maddox of Wormley (cr. 11 March 1676), extinct with the grantee's death.
- Morland of Sulhamstead Banister (cr. 18 July 1660), extinct with the death of the second baronet
- Moyer of Petsey Hall (cr. 25 March 1701), extinct with the grantee's death.

=== 1717 ===
- Bendish of Steeple Bumpstead (cr. 29 June 1611), extinct with the death of the fourth baronet.
- Nicolls of Hardwick (cr. 28 July 1641), extinct with the death of the third baronet.

=== 1718 ===
- Germain of Westminster (cr. 25 March 1698), extinct with the grantee's death on 11 December 1718.
- Myddleton of Chirke (cr. 4 July 1660), extinct with the death of the fourth baronet.

=== 1719 ===
- Farington of Chichester (cr. December 1697), extinct with the grantee's death on 7 August 1719
- Felton of Playford (cr. 20 July 1620), extinct with the death of the fifth baronet.
- Gell of Hopton (cr. 29 January 1642), extinct with the death of the third baronet n 15 July 1719.

=== 1720 ===
- Cole of Brancepeth (cr. 4 March 1640), extinct with the death of the fourth baronet.
- Halford of Welham, Leicestershire (cr. 27 June 1706); extinct with the death of the 3rd baronet 1720.

=== 1721 ===
- Conway of Bodrythan (cr. 25 July 1660), extinct with the death of the second baronet.
- Dillington of Knighton (cr. 6 September 1628), extinct with the death of the fifth baronet on 7 July 1721.
- Powell of Broadway (cr. 19 July 1698), extinct with the death of the second baronet.
- Rayney of Wrotham (cr. 22 January 1642), extinct with the death of the fifth baronet.
- Smith of Edmondthorpe, Leics (cr. 20 March 1661), extinct with the death of the second baronet on 15 February 1721.

=== 1722 ===
- Chute of Hinxhill Place (cr. 17 September 1684), extinct with the grantee's death on 4 February 1722.
- Hodges of Middlesex (cr. 31 March 1697), extinct with the death of the second baronet.
- Petre of Cranham Hall (cr. ca. 1642), extinct with the death of the fifth baronet.

=== 1723 ===
- Culpeper of Preston Hall (cr. 17 May 1627), extinct with the death of the third baronet on 18 May 1723.
- Gawdy of West Harling (cr. 13 July 1663), extinct with the death of the third baronet.
- Kneller of Whitton (cr. 24 May 1715), extinct with the grantee's death on 19 October 1723.
- Massingberd of Braytoft Hall (cr. 22 August 1660), extinct with the death of the third baronet

=== 1724 ===
- Cunningham of Cunninghamhead (cr. 4 July 1627), extinct with the death of the third baronet.
- Fellows of Carshalton (cr. 20 January 1719), extinct with the grantee's death.
- Goring of Burton (cr. 14 May 1622), extinct with the death of the third baronet on 29 February 1724.
- Lane of Tulske, Roscommon (cr. 9 June 1661), extinct with the death of the third baronet.

=== 1725 ===
- Orby of Croyland (cr. 9 October 1658), extinct with the death of the third baronet.
- Shaen of Kilmore (cr. 7 February 1663), extinct with the death of the second baronet.
- Vernon of Hodnet, Salop. (cr. 23 July 1660), extinct with the death of the third baronet on 1 October 1725.

=== 1726 ===
- Aucher of Bishopsbourne (cr. 4 July 1666), extinct with the death of the third baronet.
- Dormer of Lee Grange (cr. 23 July 1661), extinct with the death of the second baronet.
- Fryer of the City of London (cr. 13 December 1714), extinct with the grantee's death on 11 September 1726.
- Hamilton of Barnton (cr. 1 March 1692), extinct with the grantee's death.
- Ingoldsby of Lethenborough (cr. 30 August 1661), extinct with the death of the third baronet.

== Reign of King George II ==
=== 1727 ===
- Falconer of Glenfarquhar (cr. 20 March 1670), extinct with the death of the second baronet on 17 March 1727.
- Delves of Dodington, Cheshire (cr. 8 May 1621), extinct with the death of the fourth baronet on 12 September 1727.
- Lennard of West Wickham (cr. 15 August 1642), extinct with the death of the third baronet on 8 October 1727.

=== 1728 ===
- Blackett of Newcastle upon Tyne (cr. 23 January 1685), extinct with the death of the second baronet on 25 September 1728.
- Blackham of London (cr. 13 April 1696), extinct with the death of the second baronet.
- Dutry of the City of London (cr. 19 June 1716), extinct with the grantee's death.
- Franklin of Moor Park (cr. 16 October 1660), extinct with the death of the third baronet.
- Garrard of Langford (cr. 16 August 1662), extinct with the death of the third baronet.
- Morgan of Llanternam (cr. 12 May 1642), extinct with the death of the fourth baronet.

=== 1729 ===
- Colby of Kensington, (cr. 21 June 1720), extinct with the grantee's death on 23 September 1729.
- Delaval of Seaton (cr. 29 June 1660), extinct with the death of the third baronet on 4 June 1729.
- Fortescue of Salden (cr. 17 February 1636), extinct with the death of the fourth baronet.
- Fraser of Durris (cr. 2 August 1673), extinct with the death of the second baronet.
- Holland of Quiddenham (cr. 16 June 1629), extinct with the death of the third baronet.
- Kennedy of Clowburn (cr. 8 June 1698), extinct with the death of the second baronet.

=== 1730 ===
- Allen of London (cr. 14 June 1660), extinct with the death of the second baronet.
- Chaplin of the Inner Temple (cr. 19 September 1715), extinct with the death of the second baronet.
- Cullen of East Sheen (cr. 17 June 1661), extinct with the death of the third baronet on 15 October 1730.
- Gerard of Fiskerton, Lincolnshire (cr. 17 November 1666), extinct with the death of the second baronet.
- Huband of Ipsley (cr. 2 February 1661), extinct with the death of the third baronet.
- Jackson of Hickleton (cr. 31 December 1660), extinct with the death of the third baronet.

=== 1731 ===
- D'Ewes of Stowlangtoft Hall (cr. 15 July 1641), extinct with the death of the fourth baronet.

=== 1732 ===
- Ashurst of Waterstock (cr. 21 July 1688), extinct with the death of the second baronet on 17 May 1732.
- Duke of Benhall (cr. 16 July 1661), extinct with the death of the third baronet on 25 August 1732.
- Palgrave of Norwood Barningham (cr. 24 June 1641), extinct with the death of the third baronet.
- Potts of Mannington (cr. 14 August 1641), extinct with the death of the fifth baronet.
- Smyth of Redcliff (cr. 10 May 1661), extinct with the death of the second baronet on 20 June 1732.

=== 1733 ===
- Ashe of Twickenham (cr. 19 September 1660), extinct with the death of the second baronet on 8 November 1733.
- Bromfield of Southwark (cr. 20 March 1661), extinct with the death of the third baronet.
- Drake of Ashe (cr. 31 August 1660), extinct with the death of the sixth baronet.

=== 1734 ===
- Hussey of Honington (cr. 29 June 1611), extinct with the death of the fifth baronet.

=== 1735 ===
- Furnese of Waldershare (cr. 27 June 1707), extinct with the death of the third baronet.
- Hawkesworth of Hawkesworth (cr. 6 December 1678), extinct with the death of the second baronet.
- Kemeys of Kevanmabley (cr. 13 May 1642), extinct with the death of the fourth baronet on 29 January 1735.
- St George of Carrickdrumrusk (cr. 5 September 1660), extinct with the death of the second baronet on 4 August 1735.

=== 1736 ===
- Fyche of Eltham (cr. 7 September 1688), extinct with the death of the third baronet.
- Gifford of Burstall (cr. 21 November 1660), extinct with the death of the second baronet.
- Howe of Cold Barwick (cr. 20 June 1660), extinct with the death of the second baronet on 19 January 1736.
- Leke of Sutton (cr. 22 May 1611), extinct with the death of the fourth baronet on 17 July 1736.

=== 1737 ===
- Armytage of Kirklees (cr. 15 December 1641), extinct with the death of the sixth baronet.
- Humphreys of London (cr. 30 November 1714), extinct with the death of the second baronet.
- Tench of Low Leyton (cr. 8 August 1715), extinct with the death of the second baronet.

=== 1738 ===
- Jason of Broad Somerford (cr. 5 September 1661), extinct with the death of the sixth baronet.
- Meredith of Stainsley (cr. 13 August 1622), extinct with the death of the fifth baronet on 31 December 1738.
- Thorold of Harmston (cr. 9 September 1709), extinct with the death of the second baronet.
- Wood of Bonnytown (cr. 11 May 1666), extinct with the death of the second baronet.
- Wright of Cranham Hall (cr. 15 February 1661), extinct with the death of the fourth baronet.

=== 1739 ===
- Alexander of Menstre (cr. 12 July 1625), extinct with the death of the fifth baronet.
- Browne of London (cr. 22 July 1660), extinct with the death of the third baronet.
- Coryton of Newton (cr. 27 February 1662), extinct with the death of the fourth baronet on 22 May 1739.
- Dereham of West Dereham (cr. 8 June 1661), extinct with the death of the fourth baronet.
- Fisher of Packington Magna (cr. 7 December 1622), extinct with the death of the fourth baronet.
- Jenkinson of Walton (cr. 17 December 1685), extinct with the death of the third baronet.

=== 1740 ===
- Bridgeman of Ridley (cr. 12 November 1673), extinct with the death of the third baronet.
- Crispe of Hammersmith (cr. 14 April 1665), extinct with the death of the fifth baronet on 9 July 1740.
- Culpeper of Wakehurst, Sussex (cr. 20 September 1628), extinct with the death of the fourth baronet.
- Henley of Henley (cr. 30 June 1660), extinct with the death of the fourth baronet.
- Herbert of Tintern (cr. 3 July 1660), extinct with the death of the sixth baronet.
- Juxon of Albourne (cr. 28 December 1660), extinct with the death of the second baronet.
- Kennedy of Girvan (cr. 4 August 1673), extinct with the death of the second baronet.
- Marwood of Little Busby (cr. 31 December 1660), extinct with the death of the fourth baronet.

=== 1741 ===
- Bunce of Otterden (cr. May 1660), extinct with the death of the sixth baronet.
- Dawes of Putney (cr. 1 June 1663), extinct with the death of the fifth baronet.
- James of Creshall (cr. 28 June 1682), extinct with the death of the second baronet.
- Parker of Arwaton (cr. 16 July 1661), extinct with the death of the third baronet on 20 January 1741.
- Wentworth of North Elmsal (cr. 28 July 1692), extinct with the death of the second baronet.

=== 1742 ===
- Austen of Derehams (cr. 16 November 1714), extinct with the grantee's death on 22 March 1742.
- Ellys of Wyham (cr. 30 June 1660), extinct with the death of the third baronet on 21 February 1742.
- Everard of Ballyboy (cr. 30 April 1622), extinct with the death of the fourth baronet on 13 April 1742.
- Leicester of Tabley (cr. 10 August 1660), extinct with the death of the third baronet on 5 August 1742.
- Norwich of Brampton (cr. 24 July 1641), extinct with the death of the fourth baronet.
- Powell of Ewhurst (cr. 10 May 1661), extinct with the death of the fourth baronet.

=== 1743 ===
- Cairnes of Monaghan (cr. 6 May 1708), extinct with the death of the second baronet on 16 June 1743.
- Dutton of Sherborne (cr. 22 June 1678), extinct with the death of the second baronet.
- Fettiplace of Childrey (cr. 30 March 1661), extinct with the death of the fifth baronet.
- Lloyd of Garth (cr. 10 May 1661), extinct with the death of the second baronet.
- Napier of Punknoll (cr. 25 February 1682), extinct with the death of the second baronet.
- Newton of Barrs Court (cr. 16 August 1660), extinct with the death of the fourth baronet on 6 April 1743.
- Robinson of Long Melford (cr. 26 January 1682), extinct with the death of the third baronet.

=== 1744 ===
- Ramsay of Whitehill (cr. 2 June 1665), extinct with the death of the fifth baronet.

=== 1745 ===
- Baird of Newbyth (cr. 4 February 1680), extinct with the death of the second baronet.
- Barniston of Ketton (cr. 7 April 1663), extinct with the death of the sixth baronet.
- Chudleigh of Ashton (cr. 1 August 1622), extinct with the death of the sixth baronet.
- Everard of Much Waltham (cr. 29 January 1629), extinct with the death of the sixth baronet.
- Gleane of Hardwick (cr. 6 March 1666), extinct with the death of the fourth baronet.
- Humble of London (cr. 21 June 1660), extinct with the death of the sixth baronet.
- Roberts of Glassenbury (cr.3 July 1620), extinct with the death of the sixth baronet.
- Williams of Edwinsford (cr. 30 July 1707), extinct with the grantee's death on 19 July 1745.

=== 1746 ===
- Constable of Everingham (cr. 20 July 1642), extinct with the death of the fourth baronet.
- Fetherston of Blakesware (cr. 4 December 1660), extinct with the death of the second baronet on 17 October 1746.
- Hanmer of Hanmer (cr. 8 July 1620), extinct with the death of the fourth baronet on 7 May 1746.
- Kinloch of Kinloch (cr. 5 September 1685), forfeited by the third baronet.

=== 1747 ===
- Lade of Warbleton (cr. 11 March 1731), extinct with the death of the second baronet.
- Newman of Fifehead-Magdalen (cr. 20 December 1699), extinct with the death of the second baronet.

=== 1748 ===
- Napier of Luton Hoo (cr. 24 September 1611), extinct with the death of the sixth baronet.

=== 1749 ===
- Hungate of Saxton (cr. 15 August 1642), extinct with the death of the sixth baronet.
- Pickering of Titchmarsh (cr. 5 June 1638), extinct with the death of the fourth baronet.

=== 1750 ===
- Burton of Stockerston (cr. 22 July 1622), extinct with the death of the fourth baronet.
- Corbet of Stoke upon Tern (cr. 19 September 1627), extinct with the death of the sixth baronet.
- Dixwell of Broome House (cr. 19 June 1660), extinct with the death of the second baronet.
- Lloyd of Milfield (cr. 1 April 1708), extinct with the death of the third baronet in January 1750.
- Mansel of Margam (cr. 22 May 1611), extinct with the death of the eighth baronet on 29 November 1750.
- Morice of Werrington (cr. 20 April 1661), extinct with the death of the third baronet on 24 January 1950.
- Parker of Ratton (cr. 22 May 1674), extinct with the death of the third baronet.

=== 1751 ===
- Aston of Tixall (cr. 22 May 1611), extinct with the death of the fifth baronet.
- Hay of Linplum (cr. 26 March 1667), extinct with the death of the second baronet.

=== 1752 ===
- Bickley of Attleborough (cr. 3 September 1661), extinct with the death of the fifth baronet on 17 August 1752.
- Campbell of Ardkinglass (cr. 23 March 1679), extinct with the death of the second baronet on 5 July 1752.
- Cotton of Connington (cr. 29 June 1611), extinct with the death of the sixth baronet.
- Shaw of Greenock (cr. 28 June 1687), extinct with the death of the third baronet.

=== 1753 ===
- Child of the City of London (cr. 4 February 1685), extinct with the death of the third baronet.
- Sloane of Chelsea (cr. 3 March 1716), extinct with the grantee's death on 11 January 1753.
- Williams of Llangibby (cr. 14 May 1642), extinct with the death of the fifth baronet.

=== 1754 ===
- Browne of Kiddington (cr. 1 July 1659), extinct with the death of the third baronet.
- Brownlow of Humby (cr. 27 July 1641), extinct with the death of the fifth baronet on 27 February 1754.
- Cole of Newland (cr. 1660), extinct with the death of the second baronet on 5 October 1754.

=== 1755 ===
- Chardin of the Inner Temple (cr. 28 May 1720), extinct with the grantee's death.
- Hamilton of Rosehall (cr. 10 April 1703), extinct with the death of the third baronet.
- Jenoure of Much Dunmow (cr. 30 July 1628), extinct with the death of the sixth baronet.
- Lowther of Whitehaven (cr. 11 June 1642), extinct with the death of the fourth baronet of 2 January 1755.

=== 1756 ===
- Atkins of Clapham (cr. 13 June 1660), extinct with the death of the sixth baronet.
- Bland of Kippax Park (cr. 30 August 1642), extinct with the death of the seventh baronet.
- Blundell of Edendeny (cr. 13 October 1620), extinct with the death of the fourth baronet on 19 August 1756.
- Lowther of Marske (cr. 15 June 1697), extinct with the death of the third baronet.
- Skipwith of Metheringham (cr. 27 July 1678), extinct with the death of the third baronet.
- Wyche of Chewton (cr. 20 December 1729), extinct with the grantee's death.

=== 1757 ===
- Blount of Tittenhanger (cr. 27 January 1680), extinct with the death of the third baronet.
- Dixwell of Coton House (cr. 11 June 1716), extinct with the grantee's death.
- Keate of The Hoo (cr. 12 June 1660), extinct with the death of the fourth baronet.

=== 1758 ===
- Cooke of Dublin (cr. 28 December 1741), extinct with the grantee's death.

=== 1759 ===
- Abdy of Albyns (cr. 9 June 1660), extinct with the death of the fourth baronet.
- Alleyn of Hatfield (cr. 24 June 1629), extinct with the death of the eighth baronet.
- Clerke of Launde Abbey (cr. 18 June 1661), extinct with the death of the sixth baronet.
- Drury of Overstone (cr. 16 February 1739), extinct with the grantee's death.
- Firebrace of London (cr. 28 July 1698), extinct with the death of the third baronet on 28 March 1759.
- Lucy of Broxbourn (cr. 11 March 1618), extinct with the death of the third baronet.
- Pepperell of Boston (cr. 15 November 1746), extinct with the grantee's death on 6 July 1759.

=== 1760 ===
- Prendergast of Gort (cr. 15 July 1699), extinct with the death of the second baronet on 23 September 1760.

== Reign of King George III ==
=== 1761 ===
- Cooper of Dublin (cr. 3 October 1758), extinct with the grantee's death.
- Pile of Compton (cr. 12 September 1628), extinct with the death of the sixth baronet.

=== 1762 ===
- Butler of Polestown (cr. 8 July 1645), extinct on the death of the fourth baronet.
- Carew of Beddington (cr. 11 January 1715), extinct with the death of the second baronet.
- Cobb of Adderbury (cr. 9 December 1662), extinct with the death of the third baronet on 29 March 1762.
- Crosse of Westminster (cr. 13 July 1713), extinct with the death of the second baronet on 12 March 1762.
- Hartopp of Freathby (cr. 3 December 1619), extinct with the death of the fourth baronet.
- L'Estrange of Hunstanton (cr. 1 June 1629), extinct with the death of the seventh baronet.
- Leman of Northaw (cr. 3 March 1665), extinct with the death of the fourth baronet.
- Wolstenholme of London (cr. 10 January 1665), extinct with the death of the seventh baronet.

=== 1763 ===
- Fleming of Brompton Park (cr. 22 April 1763), extinct with the grantee's death on 6 November 1763.
- Lowther of Swillington (cr. 6 January 1715), extinct with the death of the second baronet on 6 March 1763.
- Mackenzie of Tarbat (cr. 21 May 1628), extinct with the death of the fifth baronet.

=== 1764 ===
- Beck of the City of London (cr. 1 November 1714), extinct with the death of the third baronet on 12 January 1764.
- Downing of East Hatley, Cambridge (cr. 1 July 1663); extinct with the death of the fourth baronet.
- Dudley of Clapton (cr. 1 August 1660), extinct with the death of the third baronet.
- Edwards of York (cr. 7 December 1691), extinct with the death of the third baronet.
- Fleming of Farme (cr. 25 September 1661), extinct with the death of the seventh baronet.
- Freke of West Bilney (cr. 4 June 1713), extinct with the death of the third baronet on 13 April 1713.
- Hardres of Hardres Court (cr. 3 June 1642), extinct with the death of the fifth baronet.
- Hare of Stow Bardolph (cr. 23 July 1641), extinct with the death of the fifth baronet.
- Thorold of Harmston (cr. 14 March 1740), extinct with the grantee's death.

=== 1765 ===
- Assheton of Middleton (cr. 17 August 1660), extinct with the death of the third baronet.
- Cann of Compton Green (cr. 13 September 1662), extinct with the death of the sixth baronet.
- Cocks of Dumbleton (cr. 7 February 1662), extinct with the death of the fourth baronet.
- Curson of Water Perry (cr. 30 April 1661), extinct with the death of the fourth baronet.
- Dalston of Dalston (cr. 15 February 1641), extinct with the death of the fourth baronet.
- Napier of Middle Marsh (cr. 25 June 1641), extinct with the death of the sixth baronet.

=== 1766 ===
- Barker of Grimston Hall (cr. 17 March 1622), extinct with the death of the seventh baronet.
- Hoby of Bisham (cr. 12 July 1666), extinct with the death of the fifth baronet on 29 June 1766.

=== 1767 ===
- Bond of Peckham (cr. 9 October 1658), extinct with the death of the fourth baronet.
- Briggs of Haughton (cr. 12 August 1641), extinct with the death of the fifth baronet.
- Gardiner of Lamer (cr. 16 February 1622), extinct with the death of the sixth baronet.
- Morgan of Langattock (cr. 7 February 1661), extinct with the death of the fourth baronet.
- Stewart of Tillicoultry (cr. 24 April 1707), extinct with the death of the second baronet.

=== 1768 ===
- Pleydell of Coleshill (cr. 15 June 1732), extinct with the grantee's death.
- Simeon of Chilworth (cr. 18 October 1677), extinct with the death of the second baronet.

=== 1769 ===
- Chester of Chichely (cr. 23 March 1620), extinct with the death of the ninth baronet on 17 May 1769.
- Lloyd of Peterwell (cr. 26 January 1763), extinct with the grantee's death on 19 August 1769.

=== 1770 ===
- Adams of London (cr. 14 June 1660), extinct with the death of the sixth baronet in April 1770.
- Brookes of York (cr. 15 June 1676), extinct with the death of the third baronet.
- Cornish of Sharnbrook (cr. 1 February 1766), extinct with the grantee's death on 30 October 1770.
- Dryden of Canons Ashby (cr. 16 November 1619), extinct with the death of the seventh baronet.
- Wallace of Craigie, Ayr (cr. 8 March 1670), extinct with the death of the fourth baronet.

=== 1771 ===
- Lumley of Bradfield Magna (cr. 8 January 1641), extinct with the death of the fourth baronet.
- Mildmay of Moulsham (cr. 5 February 1765), extinct with the grantee's death.
- Peyton of Doddington (cr. 21 March 1667), extinct with the death of the third baronet.

=== 1772 ===
- Astley of Patshull (cr. 13 August 1662), extinct with the death of the second baronet on 29 December 1772.
- Austen of Bexley (cr. 10 July 1660), extinct with the death of the seventh baronet.
- Boteler of Barham Court (cr. 3 July 1641), extinct with the death of the fourth baronet.
- Ingilby of Ripley Castle (cr. 17 May 1642), extinct with the death of the fourth baronet.
- Knollys of Thame (cr. 1 April 1754), extinct with the grantee's death.
- Pettus Baronets of Rackheath Hall, Norfolk (cr. 23 September 1641), extinct with the death of the sixth baronet.

=== 1773 ===
- Anderson of Eyworth (cr. 13 July 1664), extinct with the death of the third baronet.
- Compton of Hartbury (cr. 6 May 1686), extinct with the death of the fifth baronet.
- D'Oyly of Chiselhampton (cr. 7 June 1666), extinct with the death of the fourth baronet.
- Fowler of Harnage Grange (cr. 1 November 1704), extinct with the death of the fifth baronet.
- Gray of Denne Hill (cr. 5 March 1707), extinct with the death of the third baronet on 14 February 1773.

=== 1774 ===
- Corbet of Leighton (cr. 20 June 1642), extinct with the death of the fourth baronet.
- Duncan of Marylebone (cr. 9 August 1764), extinct with the grantee's death.

=== 1775 ===
- Browne of Caversham (cr. 10 May 1665), extinct with the death of the fifth baronet.
- Page of Greenwich, Kent (cr. 3 December 1714), extinct with the death of the second baronet on 4 August 1775.

=== 1776 ===
- Chamberlayne of Wickham, Oxfordshire (cr. 4 February 1603), extinct with the death of the fifth baronet on 25 January 1776.
- Danvers of Culworth (cr. 21 March 1643), extinct with the death of the fifth baronet.
- Denham of Westshield (cr. 31 January 1693), extinct with the death of the sixth baronet on 24 June 1776.
- Masham of High Lever (cr. 20 December 1621), extinct with the death of the fifth baronet.

=== 1777 ===
- Sir Charles Douglas, 1st Baronet of Carr, Perthshire (cr. 23 January 1777), extinct with the death of the sixth baronet in 1940.
- Janssen of Wimbledon (cr. 11 March 1715), extinct with the death of the fourth baronet.
- Paterson of Bannockburn (cr. 16 March 1686), extinct with the death of the second baronet on 23 March 1777.

=== 1778 ===
- Denis of St Mary's (cr. 28 October 1767), extinct with the grantee's death on 11 June 1778.
- Fownes of Dublin (cr. 26 October 1724), extinct with the death of the second baronet.
- Elwill of Exeter (cr. 25 August 1709), extinct with the death of the fourth baronet on 1 March 1778.

=== 1779 ===
- Chernock of Holcot (cr. 21 May 1661), extinct with the death of the fifth baronet.
- Fust of Hill (cr. 21 August 1662), extinct with the death of the sixth baronet.
- Gardiner of Roche Court (cr. 24 December 1660), extinct with the death of the third baronet.
- Markham of Sedgebrooke (cr. 15 August 1642), extinct with the death of the fourth baronet.
- Moore of the Navy (cr. 4 March 1766), extinct with the grantee's death on 2 February 1779.
- Mosley of Rolleston (cr. 18 June 1720), extinct with the death of the third baronet.

=== 1780 ===
- Crofton of The Mote (cr. 1 July 1661), extinct with the death of the fifth baronet.
- Fleetwood of Caldwick (cr. 19 June 1611), extinct with the death of the sixth baronet.
- Halford of Wistow, Leicestershire (cr. 18 December 1641); extinct with the death of the seventh baronet 21 July 1780.
- Moore of Jamaica (cr. 28 July 1764), extinct with the death of the second baronet.
- Turner of Warham (cr. 27 April 1727), extinct with the death of the third baronet.

=== 1781 ===
- Ayloffe of Braxted Magna (cr. 25 November 1611), extinct with the death of the sixth baronet on 19 April 1781.
- Hickman of Gainsborough (cr. 16 November 1643), extinct with the death of the fifth baronet.

=== 1782 ===
- Buck of Hamby Grange (cr. 22 December 1660), extinct with the death of the fourth baronet.
- Foley of Thorpe Lee (cr. 1 July 1767), extinct with the grantee's death.
- Hamilton of Manor Cunningham (cr. 23 January 1775), extinct with the grantee's death.
- Holte of Aston (cr. 25 November 1611), extinct with the death of the sixth baronet on 13 March 1782.
- Paterson of Eccles (cr. 9 July 1687), extinct with the death of the third baronet on 14 January 1782
- Pringle of Pall Mall (cr. 5 June 1766), extinct with the grantee's death on 18 January 1782.

=== 1783 ===
- Guise of Elmore (cr. 10 July 1661), extinct with the death of the fifth baronet.
- Home of Lumdane (cr. 31 December 1697), extinct with the death of the third baronet.
- Pollock of Pollock (cr. 30 November 1703), extinct with the death of the second baronet.

=== 1784 ===
- Charlton of Ludford (cr. 12 May 1686), extinct with the death of the fourth baronet.
- Child of Wanstead (cr. 16 July 1678), extinct with the death of the fourth baronet.
- Keyt of Ebrington (cr. 22 December 1660), extinct with the death of the fifth baronet.
- Vandeput of Twickenham (cr. 7 November 1723), extinct with the death of the second baronet.
- Williams of Clapton (cr. 4 April 1747), extinct with the death of the third baronet.

=== 1785 ===
- Brooke of Colebrooke (cr. 3 January 1764), extinct with the grantee's death on 7 March 1785.
- Chapman of London (cr. 27 June 1720), extinct with the death of the third baronet.
- Coghill of Richings (cr. 24 March 1781), extinct on the grantee's death.
- Tynte of Halsewell (cr. 26 January 1674), extinct with the death of the fifth baronet on 25 August 1785.
- Tynte of Dunlaven (cr. 24 August 1778), extinct with the grantee's death on 10 November 1785.

=== 1786 ===
- Betenson of Wimbledon (cr. 7 February 1663), extinct with the death of the fourth baronet,
- Elliott of Peebles (cr. 25 July 1778), extinct with the grantee's death 7 November 1786.

=== 1787 ===
- Jebb of Trent Place (cr. 4 September 1778), extinct with the grantee's death on 4 July 1787.
- Mannock of Gifford's Hall (cr. 1 June 1627), extinct with the death of the ninth baronet.

=== 1788 ===
- Clerke of Duddlestone (cr. 26 October 1774), extinct with the death of the second baronet.
- Price of Jamaica (cr. 13 August 1768), extinct with the death of the second baronet.

=== 1789 ===
- Barker of Bushbridge (cr. 24 March 1781), extinct with the grantee's death on 14 September 1789.
- Bernard of Huntingdon (cr. 1 July 1662), extinct with the death of the fifth baronet.
- Brydges of Wilton (cr. 17 May 1627), extinct with the death of the sixth baronet on 29 September 1789.
- Drake of Prospect (cr. 28 May 1782), extinct with the grantee's death on 19 October 1789.
- Newcomen of Kenagh (cr. 30 December 1623), extinct with the death of the eighth baronet on 27 April 1789.

=== 1790 ===
- Hawley of Buckland (cr. 14 March 1644), extinct with the death of the fourth baronet.
- Meredith of Marston (cr. 2 January 1639), extinct with the death of the third baronet on 2 January 1790.
- Skipwith of Newbold Hall (cr. 25 October 1670), extinct with the death of the third baronet.

=== 1791 ===
- Alston of Odell (cr. 13 June 1642), extinct with the death of the sixth baronet.
- Jones of Ramsbury (cr. 27 May 1774), extinct with the grantee's death.
- Lyde of Ayot St Lawrence (cr. 13 October 1772), extinct with the grantee's death.
- Verney of Middle Claydon (cr. 16 March 1661), extinct with the death of the fourth baronet on 31 March 1791.

=== 1792 ===
- Gilmour of Craigmillar (cr. 1 February 1678), extinct with the death of the third baronet on 27 December 1792.
- James of Eltham (cr. 27 August 1778), extinct with the death of the second baronet.
- Wentworth of West Bretton (cr. 27 September 1664), extinct with the death of the fifth baronet.

=== 1794 ===
- Allin of Somerleyton (cr. 14 December 1699), extinct with the death of the fourth baronet.
- Drake of Buckland (cr. 2 August 1622), extinct with the death of the fifth baronet.
- Hope of Kerse (cr. 30 May 1672), extinct with the death of the fourth baronet.
- Mayne of Marston Mortaine (cr. 22 April 1763), extinct with the grantee's death on 28 May 1794.
- Wintringham of Dover Street (cr. 7 November 1774), extinct with the grantee's death.

=== 1796 ===
- Danvers of Swithland (cr. 4 July 1746), extinct with the death of the second baronet.
- Symons of The Mynde (cr. 23 March 1774), extinct with the grantee's death on 4 July 1796.

=== 1797 ===
- Hartstonge of Bruff (cr. 20 April 1681), extinct with the death of the third baronet.
- Mainwaring of Over-Peover (cr. 22 November 1660), extinct with the death of the fourth baronet.
- Smyth of Tinny Park (cr. 5 August 1776), extinct with the grantee's death.
- Stewart of Castlemilk (cr. 29 February 1668), extinct with the death of the fifth baronet.

=== 1798 ===
- Mansel of Trimsaran (cr. 22 February 1697), extinct with the death of the fourth baronet.
- Sanderson of the City of London (cr. 6 December 1794), extinct with the grantee's death on 21 June 1798.

=== 1799 ===
- Carew of Antony (cr. 9 August 1641), extinct with the death of the eighth baronet.
- Lindsay of Evelick (cr. 15 April 1666), extinct with the death of the fifth baronet.
- Nugent of Donore (cr. 18 July 1768), extinct with the death of the third baronet.
- Rich of London (cr. 24 January 1676), extinct with the death of the sixth baronet on 8 January 1799.

=== 1800 ===
- I'Anson Baronets of Bassetbury (cr. 6 May 1652), extinct with the death of the seventh baronet.

=== 1801 ===
- Blackwell of Sprowston (cr. 16 July 1718), extinct with the death of the third baronet.
- Gresham of Lympsfield (cr. 31 July 1660), extinct with the death of the sixth baronet.
- Heron of Chipchase (cr. 20 November 1662), extinct with the death of the fifth baronet.

=== 1802 ===
- André of Southampton (cr. 4 March 1781), extinct with the grantee's death.

=== 1803 ===
- Mackworth of Normanton (cr. 4 June 1619), extinct with the death of the seventh baronet.
- Rich of Sunning (cr. 20 March 1661), extinct with the death of the fifth baronet.

=== 1804 ===
- Andrews of Doddington (cr. 11 December 1641), extinct with the death of the fifth baronet.
- La Roche of Over (cr. 17 September 1776), extinct with the grantee's death.
- Russell of Chippenham (cr. 19 January 1629), extinct with the death of the tenth baronet.
- Williams of Elham (cr. 12 November 1674), extinct with the death of the fifth baronet.

=== 1805 ===
- Tylney-Long of Westminster (cr. 1 September 1662), extinct with the death of the eighth baronet.

=== 1806 ===
- Clarke of Snailwell (cr. 25 July 1698), extinct with the death of the sixth baronet.
- Hales of Coventry, Warwick (cr. 28 August 1660); extinct with the death of the 8th baronet 16 January 1806.
- Lawson of Isell (cr. 31 March 1688), extinct with the death of the tenth baronet.
- Newdigate of Arbury (cr. 24 July 1677), extinct with the death of the fifth baronet on 23 November 1806.

=== 1807 ===
- Lovett of Liscombe House (cr. 23 October 1781), extinct with the death of the second baronet.
- Moore of Fawley (cr. 21 July 1627), extinct with the death of the sixth baronet.
- Roche of Fermoy (cr. 30 November 1782), extinct with the grantee's death on 5 June 1807.

=== 1808 ===
- Cheere of St. Margaret's (cr. 19 July 1766), extinct with the death of the second baronet.
- D'Aeth of Knowlton (cr. 16 July 1716), extinct with the death of the third baronet on 6 April 1808.
- Delaval of Ford (cr. 1 July 1761), extinct with the grantee's death on 17 May 1808.
- Heyman of Somerfield (cr. 12 August 1641), extinct with the death of the fifth baronet.
- Stirling of Ardoch (cr. 2 May 1651), extinct with the death of the fifth baronet on 8 May 1808.

=== 1809 ===
- Bensley of Saint Marylebone (cr. 25 June 1801), extinct with the death of the grantee.
- Braithwaite of Poston (cr. 18 December 1802), extinct with the death of the second baronet.
- Douglas of Castle Douglas (cr. 17 July 1801), extinct with the grantee's death.
- Goodere of Burhope (cr. 5 December 1707), extinct with the death of the fifth baronet.
- Kaye of Woodesham (cr. 4 February 1642), extinct with the death of the sixth baronet on 25 December 1809.
- Stephens of Horsfold (cr. 13 March 1795), extinct with the grantee's death on 20 November 1809.

=== 1810 ===
- Castleton of St Edmundsbury (cr. 9 August 1641), extinct with the death of the twelfth baronet.
- Conyers of Horden (cr. 14 July 1628), extinct with the death of the ninth baronet.
- Harland of Sutton Hall (cr. 3 October 1808), extinct with the grantee's death.
- More of More Hall (cr. 22 November 1675), extinct with the death of the fifth baronet.
- Turner of Kirkleatham (cr. 8 May 1782), extinct with the death of the second baronet on 1 February 1810.

=== 1811 ===
- Myers baronets (cr. 3 July 1804), extinct with the death of the second baronet.
- Smyth of Isfield (cr. 2 December 1714), extinct with the death of the third baronet.

=== 1812 ===
- Hatton of Long Stanton (cr. 5 July 1641), extinct with the death of the tenth baronet.
- Molyneux of Teversall (cr. 29 June 1611), extinct with the death of the seventh baronet.
- Parsons of Langley (cr. 9 April 1661), extinct with the death of the fourth baronet.

=== 1813 ===
- Anderson of Mill Hill (cr. 14 May 1798), extinct with the grantee's death 21 May 1813.
- Close of Mysore (cr. 12 December 1812), extinct with the grantee's death on 12 April 1813.
- Sutton of Moulsey (cr. 5 March 1806), extinct with the grantee's death.

=== 1814 ===
- Hildyward of Patrington (cr. 25 June 1660), extinct with the death of the fourth baronet.
- Howe of Compton (cr. 20 June 1660), extinct with the death of the seventh baronet on 12 July 1814.
- Mann of Linton Hall (cr. 3 March 1755), extinct with the death of the second baronet on 2 April 1814.
- Monoux of Wootton (cr. 4 December 1660), extinct with the death of the seventh baronet.

=== 1815 ===
- Aston of Aston (cr. 25 July 1628), extinct with the death of the sixth baronet.
- Peyton of Isleham (cr. 22 May 1611), extinct with the death of the eighth baronet.
- Shirley of Oat Hall (cr. 27 June 1786), extinct with the death of the second baronet.
- Taylor of Lysson Hall (cr. 1 September 1778), extinct with the death of the second baronet.

=== 1816 ===
- Bayntun-Rolt of Spye Park (cr. 7 July 1762), extinct with the second baronet.
- Marshall baronets (cr. 21 May 1658), extinct with the death of the fourth baronet.
- Molyneux of Teversall, Nottinghamshire (cr. 29 June 1611), extinct with the death of the eighth baronet.
- Pepperell of Boston (cr. 9 November 1774), extinct with the grantee's death.

=== 1817 ===
- Mawbey of Botleys (cr. 30 July 1765), extinct with the death of the second baronet.

=== 1818 ===
- Barker of Bocking Hall (cr. 29 March 1676), extinct with the death of the fourth baronet.
- Calder of Southwick (cr. 22 August 1798), extinct with the grantee's death on 1 September 1818.
- Hamilton of Dunamana (cr. 1 February 1781), extinct with the death of the second baronet.
- Leslie of Tarbert (cr. 3 September 1787), extinct with the grantee's death.

=== 1819 ===
- Alston of Chelsea (cr. 20 January 1682), extinct with the death of the eighth baronet.
- Campbell of Inverneil (cr. 4 December 1818), extinct with the grantee's death on 5 June 1819.
- Etherington of Kingston-upon-Hull (cr. 22 November 1775), extinct with the grantee's death.
- Tempest of Tong, Yorkshire (cr. 25 May 1664), extinct with the death of the fourth baronet.

== Reign of King George IV ==
=== 1820 ===
- Banks of Revesby Abbey (cr. 24 March 1781), extinct with the grantee's on 19 June 1820.
- Paul of Rodborough (cr. 3 September 1762), extinct with the death of the second baronet on 16 December 1820.

=== 1821 ===
- Cope of Bruern (cr.1 March 1714), extinct with the death of the fourth baronet.
- Horton of Chadderton (cr. 22 January 1764), extinct with the death of the third baronet.
- Lumsden of Auchindour (cr. 9 August 1821), extinct with the grantee's death in December 1821.
- Macpherson of Calcutta (cr. 27 June 1786), extinct with the grantee's death 12 January 1821.
- Poole of Poole (cr. 25 October 1677), extinct with the death of the fifth baronet.
- Tollemache of Helmingham (cr. 28 May 1611), extinct with the death of the seventh baronet on 9 March 1821.

=== 1822 ===
- Andrews of Shaw Place (cr. 19 August 1766), extinct with the death of the second baronet.
- Englefield of Wootton Basset (cr. 25 November 1611), extinct with the death of the seventh baronet on 21 March 1822.
- Hewet of Headley Hall (cr. 11 October 1621), extinct with the death of the eighth baronet.
- Silvester of Yardley (cr. 20 May 1815), extinct with the grantee's death.
- Warren of Little Marlow (cr. 1 June 1775), extinct with the grantee's death on 27 February 1822.

=== 1823 ===
- Asgill of London (cr. 17 April 1761), extinct with the death of the second baronet on 23 July 1823.
- Bond of Coolamber (cr. 21 January 1794), extinct with the death of the second baronet.
- Corbet of Stoke upon Tern (cr. 27 June 1786), extinct with the grantee's death.
- Curtius of Sweden (cr. 2 April 1652), extinct with the death of the fourth baronet on 15 January 1823.
- Halton of Samford Parva (cr. 10 September 1642); extinct with the death of the 6th baronet 9 February 1823.

=== 1824 ===
- Buller of Trenant Park (cr. 3 October 1808), extinct with the grantee's death on 15 April 1824.
- Collier of the Navy (cr. 20 September 1814), extinct with the grantee's death on 24 March 1824.
- D'Oyly of Kandy (cr. 29 August 1821), extinct with the grantee's death on 25 May 1824.
- Dudley of Sloane Street and Kilscoran House (cr. 17 April 1813), extinct with the grantee's death on 1 February 1824.
- Falkiner of Abbotstown (cr. 2 December 1812), extinct with the grantee's death on 14 September 1824.
- Flood of Newton Ormond (cr. 3 June 1980), extinct with the grantee's death on 1 February 1824.
- Gideon of Belvedere (cr. 21 May 1759), extinct with the grantee's death on 25 December 1824.
- Hales of Beakesbourne, Kent (cr. 12 July 1660); extinct with the death of the 5th baronet 12 April 1824.

=== 1825 ===
- Ochterlony of Pitforthy (cr. 7 March 1816), extinct with the grantee's death on 15 July 1825.
- Riggs-Miller of Ballicasey (cr. 24 August 1778), extinct with the death of the second baronet.
- Worsley of Appuldurcombe (cr. 29 June 1611), extinct with the death of the ninth baronet.

=== 1826 ===
- Green of Marass (cr. 27 June 1786), extinct with the death of the second baronet.
- Vavasour of Haselwood (cr. 24 October 1628), extinct with the death of the seventh baronet.

=== 1827 ===
- Galbraith of Shanwally (cr. 3 November 1812), extinct with the grantee's death on 30 April 1827.

=== 1828 ===
- Brograve of Worstead (cr. 28 July 1791), extinct with the death of the second baronet on 1 June 1828.
- Cooper of Walcott (cr. 19 February 1828), extinct with the grantee's death.
- East of Hall Place (cr. 5 June 1766), extinct with the death of the second baronet.
- Woodford of Carleby (cr. 28 July 1791), extinct with the death of the second baronet on 17 May 1828.

=== 1829 ===
- Dalrymple of Hailes (cr. 8 May 1701), extinct with the death of the fifth baronet on 17 October 1829.
- Hales of Woodchurch and Tunstall, Kent (cr. 1 February 1626); extinct with the death of the 6th baronet 1829.
- Hawkins of Trewithen (cr. 28 July 1791), extinct with the grantee's death on 6 April 1829.
- Lippincott of Stoke Bishop (cr. 7 September 1778), extinct with the death of the second baronet.

=== 1830 ===
- Pakington of Ailesbury (cr. 22 June 1620), extinct with the death of the eight baronet on 6 January 1830

== Reign of King William IV ==
=== 1830 ===
- Pole of the Navy (cr. 12 September 1801), extinct with the grantee's death on 6 September 1830.

=== 1831 ===
- Green of Milnrow (cr. 5 December 1805), extinct with the grantee's death.
- Innes of Lochalsh (cr. 28 April 1819), extinct with the grantee's death.
- Montgomery of Magbie Hill (cr. 28 May 1774), extinct with the death of the second baronet.
- Mostyn of Mostyn (cr. 3 August 1660), extinct with the death of the sixth baronet on 17 April 1831.

=== 1832 ===
- Barrington of Barrington Hall (cr. 29 June 1611), extinct with the death of the tenth baronet.
- Bickerton of Upwood (cr. 29 May 1778), extinct with the death of the second baronet on 9 February 1832.
- Playters of Sotterley (cr. 13 August 1623), extinct with the death of the eight baronet.

=== 1833 ===
- Henderson of Fordell (cr. 15 July 1664), extinct with the death of the sixth baronet.
- Ormsby of Cloghans (cr. 29 August 1812), extinct with the death of the third baronet on 9 August 1833.

=== 1834 ===
- Clarges of St Martin's in the Fields (cr. 20 October 1674), extinct with the death of the fourth baronet.
- Lawrence of Brough Hall (cr. 6 July 1665), extinct with the death of the sixth baronet.
- May of Mayfield (cr. 30 June 1763), extinct with the death of the fourth baronet.

=== 1835 ===
- Colyear of Holland (cr. 20 February 1677), extinct with the death of the fifth baronet on 18 January 1835.
- Laforey of Whitby (cr. 2 December 1789), extinct with the death of the second baronet.
- Mill of Camois Court (cr. 31 December 1619), extinct with the death of the tenth baronet.

=== 1836 ===
- Erskine of Torrie (cr. 28 July 1791), extinct with the death of the fourth baronet.
- Greenhill-Russell of Chequers Court (cr. 15 September 1831), extinct with the grantee's death on 12 December 1836.

=== 1837 ===
- Elford of Bickham (cr. 26 November 1800), extinct with the grantee's death on 30 November 1837.
- Smith of Pickering, Canada (cr. 30 August 1821), extinct with the grantee's death on 9 May 1837.

== Reign of Queen Victoria ==
=== 1838 ===
- Arnot of Arnot (cr. 27 July 1629), extinct with the death of the ninth baronet.
- Hume of Wormleybury (cr. 4 April 1769), extinct with the death of the second baronet on 24 March 1838.
- Lade of Warbleton (cr. 17 March 1758), extinct with the death of the second baronet on 10 February 1838.
- Palmer of Wingham (cr. 29 June 1621), extinct with the death of the sixth baronet.
- Saxton of Circourt (cr. 26 July 1794), extinct with the death of the second baronet.

=== 1839 ===
- Clayton of Adlington (cr. 19 May 1774), extinct with the death of the second baronet.
- Coffin of the Magdalaine Islands (cr. 19 May 1804), extinct with the grantee's death on 23 July 1839.
- Goodricke of Ribston (cr. 14 August 1641), extinct with the death of the eighth baronet.
- Hardy of the Navy (cr.4 February 1806), extinct with the grantee's death on 20 September 1839.

=== 1840 ===
- Brabazon of Newpark (cr. 16 December 1797), extinct with the death of the second baronet on 24 October 1840.

=== 1841 ===
- Bruce of Dublin (cr. 23 December 1812), extinct with the grantee's death.
- Cromie of Stacombrie (cr. 3 August 1776), extinct with the death of the second baronet.
- Johnston of Gilford (cr. 27 July 1772), extinct with the death of the second baronet.
- Milnes of Gauley (cr. 21 March 1801), extinct with the death of the second baronet.

=== 1842 ===
- Apreece of Washingley (cr. 12 July 1782), extinct with the death of the second baronet.
- Rae of Esk Grove (cr. 27 June 1804), extinct with the death of the third baronet on 19 October 1842.
- Rowley of the Navy (cr. 2 November 1813), extinct with the grantee's death on 10 January 1842.

=== 1843 ===
- Hislop of Tothiill (cr. 2 November 1814), extinct with the grantee's death on 3 May 1843.
- Leigh of Whitley (cr. 22 May 1815), extinct with the grantee's death.
- Shaw of Kilmarnock (cr. 21 September 1809), extinct with the grantee's death on 22 October 1843.
- Stirling of Mansfield, Ayrshire C. (19 July 1792), extinct with the death of the second baronet on 13 February 1843.

=== 1844 ===
- Lloyd of Lancing (cr. 30 September 1831), extinct with the grantee's death on 24 October 1844.
- Wentworth of Parlut (cr. 16 May 1795), extinct with the death of the second baronet.

=== 1846 ===
- Davie of Creedy (cr. 9 September 1641), extinct with the death of the tenth baronet.
- Fetherstonhaugh of Fetherstonhaugh (cr. 3 January 1747), extinct with the death of the second baronet.

=== 1847 ===
- Chichester of Green Castle, (cr. 13 September 1821), extinct with the grantee's death.
- Scott of Abbotsford (cr. 22 April 1820), extinct with the death of the second baronet.

=== 1848 ===
- Evelyn of Wotton, Surrey (cr. 6 August 1713), extinct with the death of the fifth baronet on 28 August 1848.
- Harland of Sproughton (cr. 13 March 1771), extinct with the death of the second baronet.
- Kent of Fornham (cr. 16 August 1782), extinct with the death of the third baronet.
- Laurie of Mexwelton (cr. 27 March 1685), extinct with the death of the sixth baronet.
- Reynell of Laleham (cr. 27 July 1678), extinct with the death of the sixth baronet on 10 February 1848.

=== 1849 ===
- Crompton of Wood End (cr. 21 July 1838), extinct with the grantee's death on 27 December 1849.
- Tufton of Hothfield (cr. 29 June 1611), extinct with the death of the twelfth baronet on 12 June 1849.

=== 1850 ===
- Flower baronets (cr. 1 December 1809), extinct the death of the second baronet.
- Nagle of Jamestown (cr. 4 January 1813), extinct with the death of the second baronet.
- Talbot of Mickleham and Belfast (cr. 31 March 1790), extinct with the death of the third baronet.

=== 1851 ===
- Jackson of Fort Hill (cr. 21 April 1813), extinct with the grantee's death.
- Owen of Orielton (cr. 11 August 1641), extinct with the death of the eighth baronet.

=== 1852 ===
- Cornwallis of Brome (cr. 1627), extinct with the death of the ninth baronet.
- Pennyman of Ormesby (cr. 22 February 1664), extinct with the death of the seventh baronet.
- Smyth of Upton (cr. 30 March 1665), extinct with the death of the sixth baronet.

=== 1853 ===
- Home of Well Manor (cr. 2 January 1813), extinct with the death of the second baronet.
- Lamb of Brocket Hall (cr. 17 January 1755), extinct with the death of the fourth baronet on 29 January 1853.
- Micklethwait of Iridge Place (cr. 27 July 1838), extinct with the grantee's death.

=== 1854 ===
- Amcotts of Kettlethorp (cr. 11 May 1796), extinct with the death of the second baronet.
- Heron of Newark upon Trent (cr. 25 August 1778), extinct with the death of the second baronet on 29 May 1854.
- Hillary of Danbury Place (cr. 8 November 1805), extinct with the death of the second baronet.
- Ingilby of Ripley Castle (cr. 8 June 1781), extinct with the death of the second baronet.
- Martin of Long Melford, Suffolk (cr. March 1667); extinct with the death of the 5th baronet 15 December 1854.
- Turton of Starborough Castle, Surrey (cr.13 May 1796), extinct with the death of the second baronet.
- Wylie of St Petersburg (cr. 2 July 1814), extinct with the grantee's death on 2 March 1854.

=== 1855 ===
- Chad of Thursford (cr. 28 July 1791), extinct with the death of the second baronet.
- Cullum of Hastede (cr. 18 June 1660), extinct with the death of the eighth baronet on 26 January 1855.
- Inglis of Milton Bryan, Beds (cr. 6 June 1801), extinct with the death of the second baronet on 5 May 1855.

=== 1856 ===
- Aubrey of Llantrithyd (cr. 23 July 1660), extinct with the death of the seventh baronet.
- George of Park Place and St Stephen's Green (cr. 18 September 1809), extinct with the death of the second baronet.
- Hunloke of Wingerworth (cr. 28 February 1643), extinct with the death of the seventh baronet.

=== 1857 ===
- Price of Foxley (cr. 12 February 1828), extinct with the death of the second baronet on 6 February 1857.

=== 1858 ===
- Ainslie baronets (cr. 19 November 1804), extinct with the death of the second baronet.
- Caldwell of Wellsborough, Fermanagh (cr. 23 June 1683), extinct with the death of the seventh baronet.
- Dukinfield of Dukinfield (cr. 16 June 1665), extinct with the death of the seventh baronet.

=== 1859 ===
- Farnaby of Keppington (cr. 21 July 1726), extinct with the death of the fifth baronet.
- Newport of Newpark (cr. 25 August 1789), extinct with the death of the second baronet.
- Staunton of Cargins (cr. 31 October 1785), extinct with the death of the second baronet on 10 August 1859.
- Vaughan of Nannau (cr. 28 July 1791), extinct with the death of the third baronet.

=== 1860 ===
- Blake of Twizell Castle (cr. 25 May 1774), extinct with the death of the third baronet on 10 September 1860.
- Ferguson of The Farm (cr. 7 October 1802), extinct with the death of the second baronet on 13 March 1860.
- Hopkins of Athboy (cr. 25 July 1795), extinct with the death of the second baronet on 11 May 1860.
- Middleton of Crowfield (cr. 12 May 1804), extinct with the death of the second baronet.

=== 1861 ===
- Anderson of Fermoy (cr. 22 March 1813), extinct with the grantee's death on 4 April 1861.

=== 1862 ===
- Brenton of London (cr.24 December 1812), extinct with the death of the second baronet.

=== 1863 ===
- Brydges of Denton Court (cr. 27 May 1815), extinct with the death of the second baronet.
- Cameron of Fassiefern (cr. 8 March 1817), extinct with the death of the second baronet.
- Cotton of Landwade (cr. 14 July 1611), extinct with the death of the sixth baronet.

=== 1864 ===
- Dalling of Burwood (cr. 11 March 1783), extinct with the death of the second baronet.
- Loftus of Mount Loftus (cr. 16 July 1768), extinct with the third baronet.
- Yea of Pyrland (cr. 18 June 1759), extinct with the death of the third baronet.

=== 1865 ===
- Easthope of Fir Grove (cr. 24 August 1841), extinct with the grantee's death on 11 December 1865.
- Nelthorpe of Grays Inn (cr. 10 May 1666), extinct with the death of the eighth baronet.

=== 1866 ===
- Dalrymple of High Mark (cr. 6 March 1815), extinct with the death of the second baronet on 3 March 1866.
- Irving of Woodhouse and Robgill Tower (cr. 10 September 1809), extinct with the death of the third baronet.

=== 1867 ===
- Hall of Llanover Court, Monmouth (cr. 16 August 1838); extinct with the grantee's death 1867.
- Hippisley of Warfield (cr. 10 May 1796), extinct with the death of the second baronet.
- Lafontaine of the City of Montreal (cr. 28 August 1854), extinct with the death of the second baronet.

=== 1868 ===
- Abdy of Felix Hall (cr. 14 July 1641), extinct with the death of the seventh baronet on 16 April 1868.
- Dundas of Richmond (cr. 22 May 1815), extinct with the death of the fourth baronet.
- Head of The Hermitage (cr. 16 June 1676), extinct with the death of the eighth baronet on 28 January 1868.
- Lemon of Carclew (cr. 24 May 1774), extinct with the death of the second baronet. on 13 February 1868.
- Palliser of The Vache (cr. 6 August 1773), extinct with the death of the third baronet.
- Salusbury of Llanwern (cr. 4 May 1795), extinct with the death of the third baronet.
- Shaw of Kilmarnock (cr. 14 January 1813), extinct with the death of the second baronet.
- Thompson of Virkees (cr. 23 June 1797), extinct with the death of the third baronet on 1 July 1868.

=== 1869 ===
- Clifton of Clifton, Nottinghamshire (cr. 22 May 1611), extinct with the death of the ninth baronet on 30 May 1869.
- Parker of Bassingbourn (cr. 13 January 1783), extinct with the death of the fifth baronet on 13 March 1869.
- Rich of Sunning, Berkshire (cr, 22 January 1863), extinct with the grantee's death on 5 November 1869.

=== 1870 ===
- Bateson-Harvey of Killoquin (cr. 26 August 1789), extinct with the death of the second baronet.
- Bishopp of Parham (cr. 24 July 1620), extinct with the death of the twelfth baronet on 27 January 1870.
- Burrard of Lymington (cr. 12 November 1807), extinct with the death of the second baronet.
- Massey of Donass (cr. 9 March 1782), extinct with the death of the third baronet.
- Shee of Dunmore (cr. 22 January 1794), extinct with the death of the second baronet on 25 January 1870.

=== 1871 ===
- Burgoyne of the Army (cr. 18 April 1856), extinct with the grantee's death on 7 October 1871.
- Hawkey-Whitshead of Killincarrick (cr. 16 May 1834), extinct with the death of the third baronet.

=== 1872 ===
- Baxter of Kilmaron (cr. 24 January 1863), extinct with the grantee's death on 13 October 1872.
- Rokewode-Gage of Hengrave (cr. 15 July 1662), extinct with the death of the ninth baronet.

=== 1873 ===
- Cox of Dunmanway (cr. 21 November 1706), extinct with the death of the twelfth baronet.
- De Burgo of Castle Conel (cr. 16 June 1785), extinct with the death of the fourth baronet.

=== 1874 ===
- Ball of Blofield (cr. 24 June 1801), extinct with the death of the second baronet.
- Chatterton of Castle Mahon (cr. 3 August 1801), extinct with the death of the third baronet on 5 January 1874.
- Glynne of Bisseter (cr. 20 May 1661), extinct with the death of the ninth baronet on 17 June 1874.
- Oglander of Nunwell (cr. 12 December 1665), extinct with the death of the seventh baronet.

=== 1875 ===
- Boswell of Auchinleck (cr. 16 August 1821), extinct with the death of the second baronet.
- Lyell of Kinnordy (cr. 22 August 1864), extinct with the grantee's death on 22 February 1875.
- Macdonnell of Kilsharvan (cr. 20 January 1872), extinct with the grantee's death on 21 January 1875.
- Musgrave of Hayton Castle (cr. 20 October 1638), extinct with the death of the tenth baronet.

=== 1876 ===
- Emerson Tennent of Tempo Manor (cr. 14 February 1867), extinct with the death of the second baronet.
- Fletcher of Carrow (cr. 14 December 1812), extinct with the death of the second baronet.
- Foulis of Ingleby (cr. 6 February 1620), extinct with the death of the ninth baronet.
- Gibbons of Sittingbourne (cr. 22 March 1872), extinct with the grantee's death.
- Hamilton of Woodbrook (cr. 21 December 1814), extinct with the death of the second baronet.
- Peacocke of Grange and Barntinck (cr. 24 December 1802), extinct with the death of the third baronet.
- Taylor of Hollycombe (cr. 21 January 1828), extinct with the death of the second baronet.

=== 1877 ===
- Griffies-Williams of Llwyny Wormwood (cr. 22 May 1815), extinct with the death of the third baronet.
- Tyrell of Boreham House (cr. 28 September 1809), extinct with the death of the second baronet on 19 September 1877.

=== 1878 ===
- East of Calcutta (cr. 25 April 1823), extinct with the death of the second baronet.

=== 1879 ===
- Borough of Coolock Park (cr. 13 November 1813), extinct with the death of the second baronet.
- Campbell of Dunstaffnage (cr. 11 March 1836), extinct with the death of the third baronet.

=== 1880 ===
- Birch of Hasles (cr. 30 September 1831), extinct with the death of the second baronet on 3 March 1880.

=== 1881 ===
- Chichester of Arlington Court (cr. 7 September 1840), extinct with second baronet on 25 January 1881.

=== 1882 ===
- Gilpin of Hockliffe Grange (cr. 19 February 1876), extinct with the grantee's death on 8 April 1882.

=== 1883 ===
- Bernard of Nettleham (cr. 5 April 1769), extinct with the death of the sixth baronet on 8 May 1883.
- Bourne of Hackinsall Hall and Heathfield (cr.10 May 1880), extinct with the death of the second baronet.
- Copley of Sprotbrough, Yorks (cr. 28 August 1778), extinct with the death of the fourth baronet on 4 January 1883.
- Corrigan of Cappagh, Inniscorrig and Marrion Square (cr. 5 February 1866), extinct with the death of the second baronet.
- Mackenzie of Kilcoy (cr. 15 March 1836), extinct with the death of the second baronet.
- Philips of Weston (cr. 21 February 1828), extinct with the death of the second baronet on 22 February 1883.
- Robinson of Rokeby Park (cr. 10 March 1731), extinct with the death of the eighth baronet on 25 May 1883.
- Williams of Kars (cr. 18 July 1856), extinct with the grantee's death on 26 July 1883.

=== 1884 ===
- Ennis of Ballinahown Court (cr. 27 July 1866), extinct with the death of the second baronet on 28 May 1884.

=== 1885 ===
- Knighton of Carlston (cr. 1 January 1813), extinct with the death of the second baronet.
- Montefiore of East Cliff Lodge (cr. 23 July 1846), extinct with the grantee's death on 28 July 1885.
- Reid of Barra (cr. 30 November 1703), extinct with the death of the seventh baronet.

=== 1886 ===
- Crampton of Merrion Square (cr. 14 March 1839), extinct the death of the second baronet.
- Kerrison of Hoxne Hall (cr. 8 August 1821), extinct with the death of second baronet on 11 July 1886.
- Paulet of West Hill Lodge (cr. 18 March 1836), extinct with the grantee's death.

=== 1887 ===
- Briggs of Briggs-Dayrell (cr. 27 November 1871), extinct with the grantee's death.
- Broke of Broke Hall (cr. 2 November 1813), extinct with the death of the third baronet.
- Calder of Muirtone (cr. 5 November 1686), extinct with the death of the sixth baronet.
- Duckworth of Topsham (cr. 2 November 1813), extinct with the death of the second baronet.
- Lyons of Christchurch (cr. 29 July 1840), extinct with the death of the second baronet on 5 December 1887.
- Whitworth of The Firs (cr. 7 October 1869), extinct with the grantee's death on 22 January 1887.

=== 1888 ===
- Buxton of Shadwell Lodge (cr. 25 November 1800), extinct with the death of the third baronet.
- Harnage of Belswardyne (cr. 28 July 1821), extinct with the death of the third baronet.
- Marjoribanks of Lees (cr. 6 May 1818), extinct with the death of the fourth baronet.

=== 1889 ===
- Boyd of Danson (cr. 2 June 1775), extinct with the death of the sixth baronet.
- O'Donnell of Newport House (cr. 22 December 1780), extinct with the death of the fifth baronet.
- Ouseley of Claremont (cr. 3 October 1808), extinct with the death of the second baronet on 6 April 1889.

=== 1890 ===
- Browne of Palmerston (cr. 8 December 1797), extinct with the death of the third baronet.
- Drummond-Stewart of Blair and Balcaskie (cr. 2 June 1683), extinct with the death of the eighth baronet.
- Knox-Gore of Belleek Manor (cr. 5 December 1868), extinct with the death of the second baronet.
- Wallace of Hertford House, London (cr. 24 November 1871), extinct with the grantee's death on 20 July 1890.

=== 1891 ===
- Anderson of Broughton (cr. 11 December 1660), extinct with the death of the ninth baronet.
- Gabriel of Edgecombe Hall (cr. 3 August 1867), extinct with the grantee's death on 23 February 1891.
- Hewett of Chesterfield Street (cr. 6 August 1883), extinct with the death of the third baronet.
- Jones-Brydges of Boultibrook (cr. 9 October 1807), extinct with the death of the second baronet.
- St Paul of Ewart Park (cr. 17 November 1813), extinct with the death of the second baronet.

=== 1892 ===
- Evans of Allestree Hall (cr. 18 July 1887), extinct with the grantee's death.
- O'Malley of Rosehill (cr. 2 July 1804), extinct with the death of the second baronet.

=== 1893 ===
- Clavering of Axwell (cr. 5 June 1616), extinct with the death of the tenth baronet.
- Errington of Hooton (cr. 17 June 1661), extinct with the death of the eleventh baronet.
- Lewis of Brighton (cr. 6 April 1887), extinct the grantee's death on 10 February 1893.
- McClure of Belmont (cr. 20 March 1874), extinct with the grantee's death on 21 January 1893.

=== 1894 ===
- Tempest of Heaton (cr. 30 July 1866), extinct with the grantee's death on 1 August 1894.

=== 1895 ===
- Clifford of the Navy (cr. 4 August 1838), extinct with the death of the fourth baronet on 22 November 1895.
- Graham of Kirkstall (cr. 3 October 1808), extinct with the death of the fourth baronet.
- Harland of Ormiston and Brompton (cr. 25 July 1885), extinct with the grantee's death on 24 December 1895.

=== 1896 ===
- Booth of Portland Place (cr. 27 March 1835), extinct with the death of the third baronet.
- Brodie of Idvies (cr. 28 March 1892), extinct with the grantee's death.
- Davis of Hollywood (cr. 18 July 1845), extinct with the death of the second baronet.
- Gilstrap of Fornham St Genevieve and of the High Beeches (cr. 28 July 1887), extinct with the grantee's death.
- Goldsmid of St John's Lodge (cr. 15 October 1841), extinct with the death of the third baronet on 7 January 1896.
- Hayes of Westminster (cr. 6 February 1797), extinct with the death of the third baronet.
- Puleston of Emral (cr. 2 November 1813), extinct with the death of the fourth baronet.
- Reynolds of Grosvenor Street (cr. 1 January 1895), extinct with the grantee's death on 29 May 1896.

=== 1897 ===
- Halford of Wistow, Leicestershire (cr. 27 September 1809), extinct with the death of the 5th baronet 7 April 1897.
- Lawrence of Westbourne Terrace (cr. 16 December 1869), extinct with the grantee's death on 21 May 1897.
- Morgan of Green Street and Lincoln's Inn (cr. 13 October 1892), extinct with the grantee's death on 25 August 1897.

=== 1898 ===
- Clarke of Salford Shirland (cr.1 May 1617), extinct with the death of the eleventh baronet.
- Quain of Harley Street and Carrigoon (cr. 1891), extinct with the grantee's death.

=== 1899 ===
- Larpent of Roehampton (cr. 13 October 1841), extinct with the death of the third baronet.

=== 1900 ===
- Barron of Bellevue (cr. 12 October 1841), extinct with the death of the second baronet.
- Brooks of Manchester (cr. 4 March 1886), extinct the grantee's death on 9 June 1900.
- Campbell of Carrick Buoy (cr. 30 September 1831), extinct with the death of the fourth baronet.
- Conroy of Llanbrynmair (cr. 7 July 1837), extinct with the death of the third baronet.
- Cowan of Beeslack (cr. 12 May 1894), extinct with the grantee's death.
- Edwardes of Shrewsbury (cr. 22 April 1678), extinct with the death of the tenth baronet.
- Jephson of Spring Vale (cr. 1 June 1815), extinct with the death of the fourth baronet.
- Meux of Theobald's Park (cr. 30 September 1831), extinct with the death of the third baronet.

== Reign of King Edward VII ==
=== 1901 ===
- Martin of Cappagh (cr. 2 June 1885), extinct with the grantee's death on 18 October 1901.
- Smyth of Ashton Court (cr. 25 April 1859), extinct with the grantee's death on 27 September 1901.

=== 1902 ===
- Abel of Whitehall Court (cr. 25 May 1893) extinct with the death of the 1st baronet on 6 September 1902.
- Burton of Pollacton (cr. 2 October 1758), extinct with the death of the fifth baronet.
- Carmichael of Nutwood (cr. 25 August 1821), extinct with the death of the third baronet on 31 May 1902.
- Duckett of Hartham House (cr. 21 June 1791), extinct with the death of the third baronet on 13 May 1902
- Fowler of Gastard House (cr. 1 August 1885), extinct with the death of the second baronet.
- Scott of Ancrum (cr. 27 October 1671), extinct with the death of the seventh baronet.

=== 1903 ===
- Bramwell of Hyde Park Gate (cr. 25 January 1889), extinct with the grantee's death on 30 November 1903.
- Call of Whiteford (cr. 28 July 1791), extinct with the death of the fourth baronet.
- Parker of Harburn (cr. 24 July 1797), extinct with the death of the sixth baronet.
- Reid of Ewell Grove (cr. 10 November 1823), extinct with the death of the fourth baronet.

=== 1904 ===
- Forster of Coolderry (cr. 15 January 1794), extinct with the death of the fourth baronet.
- Halkett of Pitfirrane, Fife, (cr. 31 December 1697), extinct or possibly dormant with the death of the 8th baronet on 8 March 1904.
- Hunt of Cromwell Road (cr. 13 October 1892), extinct with the grantee's death on 21 January 1904.
- Musgrave of Drumglass (cr. 4 March 1897), extinct with the grantee's death.
- Steel of Murieston (cr. 6 July 1903), extinct with the grantee's death.
- Watson of Fulmer (cr. 22 March 1760), extinct with the death of the fourth baronet.

=== 1905 ===
- Burdon Sanderson of Banbury Road (cr.10 August 1899), extinct with the grantee's death on 23 November 1905.
- Carbutt of Nanhurst (cr. 1 October 1892), extinct with the grantee's death on 8 October 1905.
- Cowper of Rattingcourt (cr. 4 March 1642), extinct with the death of the ninth baronet on 18 July 1905.
- Morshead of Trenant Park (cr. 22 January 1784), extinct with the death of the third baronet.

=== 1906 ===
- Wells of Upper Grosvenor Street (cr. 11 May 1883), extinct with the death of the second baronet.

=== 1907 ===
- Birkbeck of Horstead Hall (cr. 9 March 1886), extinct with the grantee's death on 2 September 1907.
- Pearce of Cardell (cr. 21 July 1887), extinct with the death of the second baronet on 2 November 1907.
- Riddell of Ardnamurchan (cr. 2 September 1778), extinct with the death of the fourth baronet.
- Wilson of Archer House (cr. 26 August 1897), extinct with the grantee's death.

=== 1908 ===
- Brooke of Armitage Bridge (cr. 4 August 1899), extinct with the grantee's death.
- Campbell of Blythswood (cr. 4 May 1880), extinct with the grantee's death on 8 July 1908.
- FitzGerald of Newmarket on Fergus (cr. 5 January 1822), extinct with the death of the fifth baronet.

=== 1909 ===
- Burke of Glinsk (cr. 2 August 1628), extinct with the death of the thirteenth baronet on 4 April 1909.
- Pottinger of Richmond (cr. 27 April 1840), extinct with the death of the third baronet.

=== 1910 ===
- Palmer of Reading (cr. 25 August 1904), extinct with the grantee's death on 16 April 1910.

== Reign of King George V ==
=== 1911 ===
- Elliot of Penshaw (cr. 15 May 1874), extinct with the death of the fourth baronet.
- Honyman of Armadale (cr. 19 May 1804), extinct with the death of the fifth baronet.
- Lewis of Harpton Court (cr. 11 July 1846), extinct with the death of the fourth baronet.
- Northcote of Exeter (cr. 23 November 1887), extinct with the grantee's death on 29 September 1911.
- Peel of Tyersall Hall (cr. 2 September 1897), extinct with the grantee's death.
- Powell of Horton Old Hall (cr. 15 June 1892), extinct with the grantee's death on 24 December 1911.
- Scotter of Surbiton (cr. 16 July 1907), extinct with the death of the second baronet.

=== 1912 ===
- Ellis of Byfleet and Hertford Street (cr. 6 June 1882), extinct with the grantee's death on 20 September 1912.
- Gibson of Regent Terrace (cr. 23 November 1909), extinct with the grantee's death.
- Hayes of Drumboe Castle (cr. 27 August 1789), extinct with the death of the fifth baronet on 27 January 1912.
- Otway of Brighthelmstone (cr. 30 September 1831), extinct with the death of the third baronet on 8 June 1912.
- Ritchie of Lees House (cr. 15 December 1903), extinct with the grantee's death.
- Scott of Connaught Place (cr. 23 February 1899), extinct with the grantee's death.
- Vavasour of Spalington (cr. 20 March 1801), extinct with the death of the third baronet.

=== 1913 ===
- Dalgliesh of Erroll Park, Mayfield, Woodburne and Baltilly and Coulin (cr. 25 July 1896), extinct with the grantee's death on 21 December 1913.
- Farmer of Mount Pleasant (cr. 19 January 1780), extinct with the death of the fifth baronet.
- Lindsay of West Ville (cr. 4 September 1821), extinct with the death of the second baronet on 7 May 1913.

=== 1914 ===
- Barker of Bishop's Stortford (cr. 1 December 1908), extinct with the grantee's death on 16 December 1914.
- Roberts of the Army (cr. 15 June 1881), extinct with the grantee's death on 14 November 1914.
- Watkin of Northenden (cr. 12 May 1880), extinct with the death of the second baronet.

=== 1915 ===
- Burrell of West Grinstead Park (cr. 5 July 1766), extinct with the death of the sixth baronet on 14 February 1915.
- Farrar of Chicheley Hall (cr. 2 February 1911), extinct with the grantee's death on 20 May 1915.
- Hoste of the Navy (cr, 21 September 1814), extinct with the death of the fourth baronet.
- Russell of Charlton Park (cr. 9 April 1832), extinct with the death of the third baronet.
- Stuart of Oxford (cr. 5 May 1841), extinct with the death of the fourth baronet.
- Webster of Alverstone (cr. 25 January 1900), extinct with the grantee's death on 15 December 1915.

=== 1916 ===
- Ashman baronets of Thirlmere (cr. 23 November 1907), extinct with the death of the second baronet.
- Blane of Blanefield (cr. 26 December 1812), extinct with the death of the fourth baronet.
- Butlin of Harley Street (cr. 28 June 1911), extinct with the death of the second baronet.
- Caird of Belmont Castle (cr. 8 February 1913), extinct with the grantee's death on 6 March 1916.
- Filmer of East Sutton (cr. 26 December 1674), extinct with the death of the tenth baronet.
- Fuller-Elliott-Drake of Nutwell Court and Yarcombe (cr. 22 August 1821), extinct with the death of the second baronet.
- Lowther of Belgrave Square (cr. 19 January 1914), extinct with the grantee's death on 5 April 1916.
- Martin of Overbury Court (cr. 12 December 1905), extinct with the grantee's death on 23 August 1916.
- Morgan of Whitehall Court (cr. 28 July 1906), extinct with the grantee's death on 12 November 1916.
- Stokes of Lensfield Cottage (cr. 6 July 1889), extinct with the death of the second baronet.

=== 1917 ===
- Burrows of London (cr. 19 Mar 1864); extinct with the death of third baronet.
- Holcroft of The Shubbery (cr. 28 July 1905), extinct with the grantee's death.
- Pennington of Muncaster (cr. 1676), extinct with the death of the ninth baronet.
- Western of Rivenhall (cr. 20 August 1864), extinct with the death of the third baronet on 1 February 1917.

=== 1918 ===
- Avery of Oakley Court (cr. 6 December 1905), extinct with the death of the second baronet.
- Dallas of Harley Street (cr. 31 July 1798), extinct with the death of the third baronet.
- Hingley of Hattherton Lodge (cr. 8 August 1893), extinct with the death of the second baronet.
- Lucas-Tooth of Queen's Gate (cr. 26 July 1906), extinct with the death of the second baronet on 12 July 1918.
- Miller of Manderston (cr. 24 March 1874), extinct with the death of the third baronet on 16 February 1918.
- Willoughby of Baldon House (cr. 8 December 1794), extinct with the death of the fifth baronet.

=== 1919 ===
- Buckley of Mawddwy (cr. 1868), extinct with the death of the second baronet, in August 1919.
- Chapman of Killua Castle (cr. 11 March 1782), extinct with the death of the seventh baronet on 8 April 1919.
- Henry of Parkwood (cr. 7 February 1911), extinct with the grantee's death on 27 December 1919.
- Lockhart of Lee (cr. 24 May 1806), extinct with the death of the fifth baronet.
- Macdonald of East Sheen (cr. 27 November 1813), extinct with the death of the fourth baronet.

=== 1920 ===
- Bagot of Levens Hall (cr. 19 April 1913), extinct with the grantee's death on 11 January 1920.
- Coote of Donnybrooke (cr. 18 May 1774), extinct with the death of the fourth baronet.
- Dixon of Warford (cr. 7 February 1918), extinct with the grantee's death.
- Errington of Lackham Manor (cr. 18 July 1885), extinct with the grantee's death.
- McIver of Sarisbury (cr. 23 July 1896), extinct with the grantee's death on 9 August 1920.
- Perring of Membland (cr. 3 October 1808), extinct with the death of the fourth baronet.
- Russell of Olney (cr. 20 June 1917), extinct with the grantee's death on 2 May 1920.
- Verdin of the Brocklehurst and Wimboldsley (cr. 24 July 1896), extinct with the grantee's death.

=== 1921 ===
- Anderson of Mullaghmore House (cr. 22 June 1911), extinct with the grantee's death on 16 July 1921.
- Burgoyne of Sutton (cr. 15 July 1641), extinct with the death of the tenth baronet.
- Claughton of The Priory (cr. 16 August 1912), extinct with the grantee's death on 27 June 1921.
- King of Corrard (cr. 6 November 1821), extinct with the death of the third baronet.
- Pocock of Hart and Twickenham (cr. 18 August 1821), extinct with the death of the fourth baronet.
- Savory of Buckhurst Park, Berks (cr. September 1891), extinct with the grantee's death on 1 October 1921.
- Scourfield of the Mote and Williamston (cr. 18 February 1876), extinct with the death of the second baronet.
- Stephen of Montreal (cr. 3 March 1886), extinct with the grantee's death on 29 November 1921.
- Wilson of Delhi (cr. 8 January 1858), extinct with the death of the third baronet on 25 May 1921

=== 1922 ===
- Adam of Blair Adam (cr. 20 May 1882); extinct with the death of the first and only baronet.
- Beale of Drumlamford (cr. 3 July 1912), extinct with the grantee's death on 13 April 1922.
- Broadhurst of North Rode (cr. 4 February 1918), extinct with the grantee's death on 2 February 1922.
- Cooper of Berrydown Court (cr. 19 October 1920), extinct with the grantee's death.
- Cox of Old Windsor (cr. 11 March 1921), extinct with the grantee's death on 27 March 1922.
- Fludyer of London (cr. 14 November 1759), extinct with the death of the fifth baronet.
- Harmsworth of Elmswood (cr. 23 August 1904), extinct with the grantee's death on 14 August 1922.
- Macmaster of Glengarry (cr. 3 March 1921), extinct with the grantee's death on 3 March 1922.
- Murphy of Altadore (cr. 9 October 1903). extinct with the grantee's death.
- Perrott of Plumstead, Kent (cr. 1 July 1716 but not registered and cr. 21 June 1911); extinct with the death of the fifth and first baronet.
- Wilson of Currygrane (cr. 3 October 1919), extinct with the grantee's death on 22 June 1922.

=== 1923 ===
- Farquhar of White Lodge (cr. 25 October 1892), extinct with the grantee's death on 30 August 1923.
- Fetherston of Ardagh (cr. 4 August 1776), extinct with the death of the sixth baronet on 11 February 1923.
- Kelk of Bentley Priory (cr. 16 May 1874), extinct with the death of the second baronet.
- Lyle of Greenock (cr. 26 June 1915), extinct with the grantee's death.
- Meredyth of Carlandstown (cr. 6 July 1795), extinct with the death of the fifth baronet on 30 September 1923
- Treloar of Grange Mount (cr. 17 July 1907), extinct with the grantee's death.
- Webster of Copthall (cr. 21 May 1703), extinct with the death of the eighth baronet.

=== 1924 ===
- Bell of Framewood (cr. 18 July 1908), extinct with the grantee's death.
- Bradstreet of Castilla (cr. 14 July 1759), extinct with the death of the seventh baronet.
- Drummond of Lasswade (cr. 27 June 1922), extinct with the grantee's death.
- Townsend-Farquhar of Mauritius (cr. 21 August 1821), extinct with the death of the sixth baronet.
- Fletcher of Ashe Ingen Court (cr. 17 May 1919), extinct with the grantee's death on 20 May 1924.
- Harpur Crewe of Calke Abbey (cr. 8 September 1626), extinct with the death of the tenth baronet.
- Hunter of London (cr. 11 December 1812), extinct with the death of the third baronet on 24 June 1924.
- Lonsdale of Prince's Gardens and The Pavilion (cr. 7 July 1911), extinct with the grantee's death on 8 June 1924.
- Oxenden of Dene (cr. 6 May 1678), extinct with the death of the tenth baronet.
- Simpson of Strathavon and the City of Edinburgh (cr. 3 February 1866), extinct with the death of the third baronet.

=== 1925 ===
- Bowen-Jones of St. Mary's Court (cr. 4 July 1911), extinct with the grantee's death.
- Hulton of Downside (cr. 25 June 1921), extinct with the grantee's death on 23 May 1925.
- Walrond of Bradfield (cr. 24 February 1876), extinct with the death of the second baronet on 17 May 1925.
- Wilson-Todd of Halnaby Hall and Tranby Park (cr. 31 August 1903), extinct with the death of the second baronet.

=== 1926 ===
- Baxter of Invereighty (cr. 21 June 1918), extinct with the grantee's death.
- Burne-Jones of Rottingdean and of The Grange (cr. 4 May 1894), extinct with the death of the second baronet.
- Channing of Maiden Newton (cr. 3 December 1906), extinct with the grantee's death on 20 February 1926.
- Clarke of Crosses Green (cr. 28 June 1804), extinct with the death of the fourth baronet.
- Houston of West Toxteth (cr. 17 January 1922), extinct with the grantee's death on 14 April 1926.
- McMahon of Dublin (cr. 6 May 1815), extinct with the death of the fourth baronet.
- Moore of Rosscarbery (cr. 29 June 1681), extinct with the death of the eleventh baronet.
- Morris of Cavendish Square (cr. 24 July 1909), extinct with the grantee's death on 14 June 1926.
- Samuel of Chelwood Vetchery (cr. 8 July 1912), extinct with the grantee's death on 13 May 1926.
- Stevenson of Walton Heath (cr. 21 February 1917), extinct with the grantee's death on 10 June 1926.
- White-Todd of Eaton Place (cr. 20 June 1913), extinct with the grantee's death.
- Williams of the City of London (cr. 30 October 1894), extinct with the grantee's death on 24 May 1926.

=== 1927 ===
- Barber of Culham Court (cr. 29 February 1924), extinct with the grantee's death on 2 July 1927.
- Brady of Hazlebrook (cr. 19 January 1869), extinct with the death of the fourth baronet.
- Edwards of Knighton (cr. 25 July 1907), extinct with the grantee's death on 10 May 1927.
- Grogan of Moyvore (cr. 23 April 1859), extinct with the death of the second baronet on 11 July 1927.
- Hibbert of Chorley (cr. 27 June 1919), extinct with the grantee's death on 15 November 1927.
- Wheler of Otterden (cr. 29 June 1925), extinct with the grantee's death.

=== 1928 ===
- Boehm of Wetherby Gardens (cr. 13 July 1889), extinct with the death of the second baronet.
- Dalziel of Grosvenor Place (cr. 14 May 1919), extinct with the grantee's death on 18 April 1928.
- Ewart of White House (cr. 14 June 1910), extinct with the grantee's death.
- Forrest of Comiston (cr. 7 August 1838), extinct with the death of the fifth baronet.
- Hamilton of Cadogan Square (cr. 21 November 1892), extinct with the grantee's death on 15 November 1928.
- Huntington of Clock House (cr. 20 July 1906), extinct with the death of the third baronet.
- Knowles of Westwood (cr. 14 December 1903), extinct with the grantee's death on 7 October 1928.
- Naesmyth of Posso (cr. 31 July 1706), extinct with the death of the eighth baronet.
- Yule of Hugli River (cr. 30 January 1922), extinct with the grantee's death on 3 July 1928.

=== 1929 ===
- Balfour of Albury Lodge (cr. 3 February 1911), extinct with the grantee's death.
- Sprot of Garnkirk, Lanarkshire (cr. 1918), extinct with the grantee's death on 8 February 1929.
- Meredith of Montreal (cr. 14 November 1916), extinct with the grantee's death on 24 February 1929.
- Nugent of Cloncoskoran (cr. 30 September 1831), extinct with the death of the third baronet.
- Turton of Upsall (cr. 2 February 1926), extinct with the grantee's death on 8 May 1929.

=== 1930 ===
- Curre of Ilton (cr. 3 February 1928), extinct with the grantee's death on 26 January 1930.
- Dewar of Homestall Manor, (cr. 7 August 1917), extinct with the grantee's death on 11 April 1930.
- Forster of Lysways Hall (cr. 17 March 1874), extinct with the death of the third baronet.
- Forster of The Grange (cr. 2 February 1912), extinct with the grantee's death on 17 April 1930.
- Laking of Kensington (cr. 28 July 1902), extinct with the death of the third baronet.
- O'Brien of Ardtona, (cr. 1916), extinct with the grantee's death on 10 September 1930.
- Seton-Steuart of Allanton (cr. 22 May 1815), extinct with the death of the fifth baronet.

=== 1931 ===
- Cust of Leasowe Castle (cr. 26 February 1876), extinct with the death of the third baronet.
- Harvey of Langley Park (cr. 28 November 1868), extinct with the death of the second baronet.
- Henry of Campden House Court (cr. 6 November 1918), extinct with the grantee's death on 19 February 1931.
- Wilmot of Osmaston (cr. 10 October 1772), extinct with the death of the sixth baronet.

=== 1932 ===
- Dale of West Lodge (cr. 13 July 1895), extinct with the death of the second baronet.
- de Bunsen of Abbey Lodge (cr. 27 March 1919), extinct with the grantee's death on 21 February 1932.
- Grant of Househill (cr. 30 July 1926), extinct with the grantee's death on 29 July 1932.
- Graves-Sawle of Penrice and Barley (cr. 22 March 1836), extinct with the death of the fourth baronet.
- Key of Thornbury and Denmark Hill (cr. 17 August 1831), extinct with the death of the fourth baronet.
- Parker of Carlton House Terrace (cr. 21 June 1915), extinct with the grantee's death on 6 September 1932.
- Rutherford of Beardwood, Lancs (cr. 27 January 1916), extinct with the grantee's death on 26 February 1932.
- Speyer of Grosvenor Street (cr. 14 July 1906) extinct with the grantee's death on 16 February 1932.
- Thomas-Stanford of Brighton (cr. 8 May 1929), extinct with the grantee's death on 7 March 1932.

=== 1933 ===
- Craig of Alsager (cr. 1 July 1927), extinct with the grantee's death on 9 April 1933.
- Dancer of Modreeny (cr. 12 August 1662), extinct with the death of the seventh baronet.
- Duncombe of Highfield (cr. 16 May 1919), extinct with the grantee's death.
- Fowler of Braemore (cr. 17 April 1890), extinct on 1 April 1933 with the death of fourth Baronet.
- Frere of Wimbledon (cr. 24 May 1876), extinct with the death of the second baronet.
- Herbert of Llanarth, Monmouth (cr. 19 July 1907), extinct 18 October 1933 with the grantee's death.
- Johnston of London (cr. 22 January 1916), extinct with the grantee's death on 10 April 1933.
- King of Cornwall Gardens (cr. 21 June 1932), extinct with the grantee's death on 14 November 1933.
- Lloyd of Bronwydd, (cr. 21 January 1863), extinct with the death of the second baronet on 4 April 1933.
- Robinson of Rosmead (cr. 6 February 1891), extinct with the death of the second baronet.
- Stern of Chertsey (cr. 16 June 1922), extinct with the grantee's death.
- Waldie-Griffiths of Munster Grillagh and Pencraig (cr. 20 April 1858), extinct with the death of the third baronet.

=== 1934 ===
- Ellis-Griffith of Llanindan (cr. 26 January 1918), extinct with the death of the second baronet.
- Forestier-Walker of Rhiwderin (cr. 9 June 1929), extinct with the grantee's death on 13 May 1934.
- Harrison of Le Court (cr. 12 July 1917), extinct with the grantee's death.
- Mainwaring of Over-Peover (cr. 26 May 1804), extinct with the death of the fifth baronet.
- Riddell of Walton Heath (cr. 31 January 1918), extinct with the grantee's death on 5 December 1934.
- Stirling of Faskine, Lanarkshire (cr. 15 December 1800), extinct with the death of the third baronet on 7 June 1934.
- Sutton of Beckenham (cr. 24 June 1922), extinct with the grantee's death.
- Wheeler-Cuffe of Leyrath (cr. 30 December 1800), extinct with the death of the death of the third baronet.

=== 1935 ===
- Bradford of Mawddwy (cr. 26 January 1931), extinct with the grantee's death on 7 April 1935.
- Buchanan of Lavington (cr. 6 February 1920), extinct with the grantee's death on 9 August 1935.
- Butcher of Danesfort (cr. 28 June 1918), extinct with the grantee's death on 30 June 1935.
- Dalziel of Brooklands (cr. 25 January 1918), extinct with the grantee's death on 15 July 1935.
- Duke of London (cr. 5 December 1848), extinct with the death of the second baronet on 3 July 1935.
- Jerningham of Cossey (cr. 16 August 1621), extinct with the death of the eleventh baronet.
- Marjoribanks of Guisachan (cr, 25 July 1866), extinct with the death of the third baronet.
- Montefiore of Worth Park (cr. 16 February 1886), extinct with the grantee's death.
- Noble of West Denton Hall (cr. 24 June 1921), extinct with the grantee's death on 11 September 1935.

== Reign of King Edward VIII ==
=== 1936 ===
- Dickson-Poynder of Hardingham Hall (cr. 21 September 1802), extinct with the death of the sixth baronet on 6 December 1936.
- Goulding of Wargrave Hall (cr. 27 July 1915), extinct with the grantee's death on 17 July 1936
- Kemp of Gissing (cr. 14 March 1642), extinct with the death of the twelfth baronet on 22 April 1936.
- Paget of Sutton Bonington (cr. 25 September 1897), extinct with the death of the second baronet on 9 December 1936.

== Reign of King George VI ==
=== 1936 ===
- Bland-Sutton of Middlesex Hospital (cr. 26 June 1925), extinct with the death of the first baronet.
- Crosbie of Maryborough in Queen's County (cr. 24 April 1630), extinct with the death of the eighth baronet.

=== 1937 ===
- Dunbar of Boath (cr. 19 September 1814), extinct with the death of the fifth baronet.
- Jackson of Wandsworth (cr. 4 July 1935), extinct with the grantee's death on 23 February 1937.
- Sullivan of Garryduff (cr. 29 December 1881), extinct with the death of the third baronet.
- Twysden of Bradbourne (cr. 13 June 1666), extinct with the death of the twelfth baronet.
- Warde of Barham Court (cr. 11 September 1919), extinct with the grantee's death on 12 April 1937.
- Worley of Ockshott (cr. 23 January 1928), extinct with the grantee's death.

=== 1938 ===
- Colleton of London (cr. 18 February 1661), extinct with the death of the ninth baronet.
- Crosfield of Highgate (cr. 27 July 1915), extinct with the grantee's death on 22 September 1938.
- Knightley of Fawsley (cr. 2 February 1798), extinct with the death of the sixth baronet.
- Milne of Inveresk (cr. 1 November 1876), extinct with the death of the second baronet in July 1938.
- Peel of Eyworth (cr. 14 July 1936), extinct with the grantee's death on 19 December 1938.
- Williams of Park (cr. 29 June 1928), extinct with the grantee's death.

=== 1939 ===
- Affleck of Dalham Hall (cr. 10 July 1782), extinct with the death of the eighth baronet.
- Allen of Marlow (cr. 23 January 1933), extinct with the death of the second baronet.
- Borrowes of Grangemellon (cr. 14 February 1646), extinct with the death of the eleventh baronet.
- Butler of Edgbaston (cr. 29 January 1926), extinct with the grantee's death.
- Colebrooke of Gatton (cr. 12 October 1759), extinct with the death of the fifth baronet on 28 February 1939.
- Goff of Goffs Oak (cr. 3 March 1936), extinct with the grantee's death on 14 April 1939.
- Harty of Prospect House (cr. 30 September 1831), extinct with the death of the fourth baronet.
- Herbert of Boyton (cr. 18 July 1936), extinct with the grantee's death on 22 March 1939.
- Montgomery of The Hall (cr. 3 October 1808), extinct with the death of the fifth baronet.
- Reid of Rademon (cr. 8 February 1936), extinct with the grantee's death on 23 March 1939.
- Sassoon of Kensington Gore (cr. 22 March 1890), extinct with the grantee's death on 3 June 1939.

=== 1940 ===
- Courtauld of Bocking (cr. 5 July 1939), extinct with the grantee's death on 13 May 1940.
- Douglas of Carr, Perth (cr. 17 March 1789), extinct 5 November 1940 with sixth baronet's death.
- Hadfield baronets, of Sheffield, Yorks. (cr. 26 June 1917), extinct 30 September 1940 with the grantee's death.
- Longman of Lavershot Hall (cr. 23 July 1909), extinct with the grantee's death.
- Molyneux of Castle Dillon (cr. 4 July 1730), extinct with the death of the tenth baronet.
- Muntz of Dunsmore (cr. 7 August 1902), extinct with the death of the third baronet.
- Ogle of Worthy (cr. 12 March 1816), extinct with the death of the eighth baronet.
- Parsons of Winton Lodge (cr. 24 June 1918), extinct with the grantee's death.
- Vernon of Hanbury Hall (cr. 23 July 1885), extinct with the death of the second baronet.
- Wallace of Terreglestown, Kirkcudbright (cr. 25 January 1922), extinct with the grantee's death.
- Webb of Llwynarthen (cr. 28 January 1916), extinct with the grantee's death on 29 October 1940.
- Yate of Madeley Hall (cr. 31 January 1921), extinct with the grantee's death on 29 February 1940.

=== 1941 ===
- Congreve of Congreve (cr. 30 June 1927), extinct with the grantee's death.
- Cooper of Singleton (cr. I July 1941), extinct with the grantee's death.
- Cory of Llantarnam Abbey (cr. 27 November 1907), extinct with the grantee's death on 3 February 1941.
- de Bathe of Knightstown (cr. 7 July 1801), extinct with the death of the sixth baronet.
- de Sausmarez of Jerburg (cr. 26 June 1928), extinct with the grantee's death.
- Faudel-Philips of Grosvenor Gardens (cr. 27 August 1897), extinct with the death of the third baronet.
- Freeling of the General Post Office and of Ford and Hutchings (cr. 11 March 1828), extinct with the death of the ninth baronet.
- Hare of Stow Hall (cr. 21 December 1905), extinct with the grantee's death.
- Holt of Liverpool (cr. 30 Jan 1935), extinct with the grantee's death on 22 March 1941.
- MacRobert of Douneside (cr. 5 April 1922), extinct with the death of the fourth baronet.
- Neeld of Grittleton (cr. 20 April 1859), extinct with the death of the third baronet.
- Priestman of Monkwearmouth (cr. 1 June 1934), extinct with the grantee's death.
- Thursby of Ormerod House and Holmhurst (cr. 26 July 1887), extinct with the death of the third baronet.
- Tubbs of Wotton-under-Edge (cr. 1929), extinct with the grantee's death.

=== 1942 ===
- Anderson of Ardtaraig (cr.7 May 1919), extinct with the grantee's death.
- Black of Louth Park (cr. 2 February 1918), extinct with the grantee's death.
- Carlile of Ponsbourne Park (cr. 27 June 1917), extinct with the grantee's death.
- Herbert of Wilton (cr. 1 March 1937), extinct with the grantee's death.
- Lockhart-Ross of Carstairs (cr.28 February 1672), extinct with the death of the ninth baronet on 29 June 1942.
- Rutherford of Liverpool (cr. 24 July 1923), extinct with the death of the second baronet on 28 December 1942.
- Shaw of Wolverhampton (cr. 30 November 1908), extinct with the grantee's death on 17 April 1942.

=== 1943 ===
- Bell of Marlborough Terrace (cr. 29 August 1895), extinct with the death of the second baronet.
- Hirst of Witton (cr. 2 July 1925), extinct with the grantee's death on 22 January 1943.

=== 1944 ===
- Armstrong of Ashburn Place (cr. 19 October 1892), extinct with the death of the third baronet.
- Collet of St. Clere, Kent (cr. 12 June 1888), extinct with the death of the second baronet on 24 September 1944.
- Des Voeux of Indiaville, Queen's Co. (cr. 1 September 1787), extinct September 1944 with the ninth baronet's death.
- Geary of Oxenheath (cr. 17 August 1782), extinct with the death of the fifth baronet.
- Hill of Green Place (cr. 6 September 1919), extinct with the death of the second baronets.
- Reckitt of Swanland Manor (17 July 1894), extinct with the death of the third baronet.
- Robinson of Batts House (cr. 11 November 1823), extinct with the death of the sixth baronet.
- Stevenson of Cleveden (cr. 22 July 1914), extinct with the grantee's death on 11 July 1944.
- Thompson of Wimpole Street (cr. 20 February 1899), extinct with the death of the second baronet on 26 May 1944.
- Wallace of Studham, Bedfordshire (cr. 8 June 1937), extinct with the grantee's death on 24 May 1944.

=== 1945 ===
- Bingham of West Lea (cr. 12 December 1903), extinct with the death of the second baronet.
- Goschen of Durrington House (cr. 27 June 1927), extinct with the grantee's death.
- Lewis of Portland Place and The Danish Pavilion (cr. 1 August 1902), extinct with the death of the third baronet.
- Nairne of Kirkcudbright (cr. 7 August 1917), extinct with the grantee's death on 7 February 1945.
- Palk of Haldon House (cr. 19 June 1782), extinct with the death of the ninth baronet.
- Scott of Dunninald (cr. 13 December 1806), extinct with the death of the fifth baronet.

=== 1946 ===
- Cope of St Mellons (cr. 1928), extinct with the grantee's death on 15 July 1946.
- Coxen of Seal (cr. 29 January 1941), extinct with the grantee's death on 7 April 1946.
- Craven (cr. 21 January 1942), extinct with the death of the second baronet.
- Hopkins of St Pancras (cr. 3 July 1929), extinct with the grantee's death on 16 February 1946.
- Isherwood of Ruggleswood (cr. 20 June 1921), extinct with the death of the second baronet.
- Wood of The Hermitage (cr. 23 September 1897), extinct with the death of the third baronet.

=== 1947 ===
- Churchman of Melton (cr. 29 June 1938), extinct with the grantee's death on 25 November 1947.
- Cuyler of St. John's Lodge (cr. 29 October 1814), extinct with the death of the fifth baronet.
- Devitt of Pangbourne (cr. 25 June 1931), extinct with the grantee's death.
- Foster of Glyde Court (cr. 30 September 1831), extinct with the death of the fourth baronet.
- Grant of Forres (cr. 25 June 1924), extinct with the death of the second baronet on 26 January 1947.
- Jervis-White-Jervis of Bally Ellis (cr. 6 December 1797), extinct with the death of the sixth baronet.
- Lever of Allerton (cr. 3 February 1920), extinct with the grantee's death on 1 July 1947.
- Sutton of Castle House (cr. 30 May 1919), extinct with the grantee's death.
- Willshire of the East Indies (cr. 22 May 1841), extinct with the death of the third baronet.

=== 1948 ===
- Falle of Plaisance (cr. 7 July 1916), extinct with the grantee's death on 1 November 1948.
- MacTaggart-Stewart of Southwick and Blairderry (cr. 7 October 1892), extinct with the death of the second baronet.

=== 1949 ===
- Campbell of New Brunswick (cr. 30 September 1831), extinct with the death of the fifth baronet.
- Churchman of Abbey Oaks (cr. 3 July 1917), extinct with the grantee's death on 3 February 1949.
- Cochrane of Woodbrook (cr. 10 February 1915), extinct with the grantee's death.
- Hudson-Kinahan of Glenville, Wyckham and Merrion Square North (cr. 26 September 1887), extinct with the death of the third baronet.
- Knott of Close House (cr. 4 July 1917), extinct with the death of the third baronet.
- Lamont of Knockdaw (cr. 16 July 1910), extinct with the death of the second baronet on 3 September 1949.
- Louis of Chelston (cr. 1 April 1806), extinct with the death of the fifth baronet.
- Milbanke of Halnaby (cr. 7 August 1661), extinct with the death of the twelfth baronet.
- Seymour of the Army (cr. 28 October 1869), extinct with the death of the second baronet.
- Shepperson of Upwood (cr. 20 June 1945), extinct with the grantee's death on 22 August 1949.

=== 1950 ===
- Carlile of Gayhurst (cr. 1928), extinct with the grantee's death.
- Herschel of Slough (cr. 17 July 1838), extinct with the death of the third baronet on 15 June 1950.
- Holland of Broughton (cr. 18 July 1907), extinct with the death of the second baronet on 24 January 1950.
- Roberts of Martholme (cr. 29 January 1931), extinct with the grantee's death.
- Sykes of Cheadle (cr. 17 July 1917), extinct with the grantee's death on 21 May 1950.
- Tyrwhitt of Stanley Hall (cr. 3 October 1808), extinct with the death of the fifth baronet on 19 April 1950.
- Wright of Swansea (cr. 27 January 1920), extinct with the death of the second baronet.

=== 1951 ===
- Andrews of Comber (cr. 6 July 1942), extinct with the grantee's death on 18 February 1951.
- Freake of Cromwell House and Fulwell Park (cr. 23 May 1882), extinct with the death of the fourth baronet.
- Hughes-Hunter of Plas Goch (cr. 4 December 1906), extinct with the death of the second baronet.
- Joseph of Stoke-on-Trent (cr. 8 July 1942), extinct with the grantee's death.
- Stewart of South Kensington (cr. 11 June 1881), extinct with the death of the third baronet.

== Reign of Queen Elizabeth II ==
=== 1952 ===
- Duff of Hatton, Aberdeen (cr. 3 July 1952), extinct 6 September 1952 with the grantee's death.
- Gregory of Bristol (cr. 3 February 1931), extinct with the grantee's death on 15 September 1952.

=== 1953 ===
- Johnson-Walsh of Ballykilcavan (cr. 24 February 1775), extinct with the death of the fifth baronet.
- Thomson of Monken Hadley (cr. 15 February 1938), extinct with the grantee's death on 8 February 1953.

=== 1954 ===
- Caird of Glenfarquhar (cr. 26 January 1928), extinct with the grantee's death on 27 September 1954.
- Campbell of Airds (cr. 3 July 1939), extinct the death of the second baronet on 16 January 1954.
- Curtis of Gatcombe (cr. 10 September 1794), extinct with the death of the fourth baronet.
- Glen-Coats of Ferguslie Park (cr. 25 June 1894), extinct with the second baronet on 7 March 1954
- Jenner of Harley Street (cr. 25 February 1868), extinct with the death of the third baronet.
- Laurie of Sevenoakes (cr. 30 November 1942), extinct with the grantee's death.
- Ripley of Acacia (cr. 4 September 1897), extinct with the death of the third baronet.

=== 1955 ===
- Bell of Mynthurst (cr. 25 November 1909), extinct with the death of the second baronet.
- Craik of Kennoway (cr. 27 January 1926), extinct with the death of the third baronet.
- Hills of Hills Court (cr. 18 February 1939), extinct with the grantee's death.
- Newnes of Wildcroft, Hollerday Hill and Hesketh House (cr. 15 February 1895), extinct with the death of second baronet on 10 July 1955.
- Ramsden of Birkensaw (cr. 1 July 1938), extinct with the grantee's death on 9 August 1955.
- Scarisbrick of Greaves Hall (cr. 17 July 1909), extinct with the death of the second baronet.

=== 1956 ===
- Boot of Nottingham (cr. 11 January 1917), extinct with the death of the second baronet.
- Chute of The Vyne (cr. 4 July 1952), extinct with the grantee's death.
- Cowan of the Baltic and Bilton (cr. 28 January 1921), extinct with the grantee's death on 14 February 1956.
- Ellis of Threshfield (cr. 24 June 1932), extinct with the grantee's death on 28 July 1956.
- Hudson of North Hackney, Middlesex (cr. 9 July 1942), extinct with the grantee's death.
- Leith of Newcastle upon Tyne (cr. 12 September 1919), extinct with the grantee's death on 9 November 1956.
- Morrison-Bell of Harpford (cr. 18 July 1923), extinct with the grantee's death on 16 April 1956.
- Ward of Blyth (cr. 29 June 1929), extinct with the grantee's death on 21 October 1956.

=== 1957 ===
- Chubb of Stonehenge (cr. 17 September 1919), extinct with the death of the second baronet.
- Gammans of Hornsey (cr. 24 January 1956), extinct with the grantee's death on 8 February 1957.
- Stockenström of Maas Ström (cr. 29 April 1840), extinct with the death of the fourth baronet.

=== 1958 ===
- Braithwaite of Burnham (cr. 28 January 1954), extinct with the grantee's death on 25 June 1958.
- Child of Newfield (cr. 7 December 1868), extinct with the death of the second baronet.
- Hughes of Denford (cr. 10 July 1942), extinct with the grantee's death.
- Ross of Dunmoyle (cr. 15 April 1919), extinct with the death of the second baronet on 31 January 1958.
- Worsley-Taylor of Moreton Hall (cr. 19 February 1917), extinct with the death of the fourth baronet.

=== 1959 ===
- Benyon of Englefield (cr. 8 July 1958), extinct with the grantee's death.
- Flannery of Wethersfield Manor (cr. 13 December 1904), extinct with the death of the second baronet.
- Fox of Liverpool (cr. 30 January 1924), extinct with the death of the second baronet on 11 February 1959.
- Green of Belsize Park (cr. 19 December 1901), extinct with the death of the fourth baronet.
- Hoare of Sidestrand Hall (cr. 7 August 1899), extinct with the death of the second baronet on 7 May 1959.
- Lawson of Brayton (cr. 30 September 1831), extinct with the death of the fourth baronet on 12 January 1959.
- Poë-Domvile of Heywood (cr. 2 July 1912), extinct with the death of the second baronet on 28 July 1959.
- Prescott of Theobald's Park (cr. 9 December 1794), extinct with the death of the seventh baronet.
- Watson of Newport (cr. 13 February 1918), extinct with the death of the third baronet.
- Williams of Glynwr (cr. 10 July 1935), extinct with the grantee's death.

=== 1960 ===
- Denys of Stratford Place (cr. 23 November 1813), extinct with the death of the fourth baronet.
- Foster of Norwich (cr. 3 August 1838), extinct with the death of the second baronet.
- Fry of Oare (cr. 29 July 1929), extinct with the grantee's death.
- Glyn of Farnborough (cr. 21 January 1934), extinct with the grantee's death on 1 May 1960.
- Magnay of Postford House (cr. 8 November 1844), extinct with the death of the third baronet on 4 September 1960.
- Rankin of Broughton Tower (cr. 5 March 1937), extinct with the grantee's death on 11 October 1960.
- Samman of Routh (cr. 19 January 1921), extinct with the death of the second baronet.

=== 1961 ===
- Cooper of Hursley (cr. 26 July 1905), extinct with the death of the second baronet.
- Loraine of Kirk Harle (cr. 26 September 1664), extinct with the death of the twelfth baronet on 23 May 1961.
- Paul of Paulville (cr. 20 January 1794), extinct with the death of the sixth baronet.
- Sassoon of Bombay (cr. 9 February 1909), extinct with the third baronet on 13 August 1961.
- Savory of The Woodlands, Bucks (cr. 24 March 1890), extinct with the death of the third baronet.
- Scott of Lytchet Minster (cr. 8 September 1821), extinct with the death of the seventh baronet.
- Smith of Kidderminster C. (30 June 1920), extinct with the death of the second baronet.

=== 1962 ===
- Blair of Harrow Weald (cr. 19 June 1945), extinct with the grantee's death on 18 September 1962.
- Cornwall of Holcombe Burnell (cr. 26 June 1918), extinct with the death of the second baronet.
- Madge of St Margaret's Bay (cr. 26 May 1919), extinct with the death of the second baronet.
- Mallaby-Deeley of Mitcham Court (cr. 28 June 1922), extinct with the death of the third baronet.
- Nugent of Portaferry (cr. 4 July 1961), extinct with the grantee's death on 18 August 1962.
- Peyton of Doddington (cr. 18 September 1776), extinct with the death of the seventh baronet.
- Philipps of Picton (cr. 23 July 1887), extinct with the death of the fourth baronet.
- Pollock of Edinburgh (cr. 2 February 1939), extinct with the grantee's death.
- Pryse of Gogardden (cr. 28 July 1866), extinct with the death of the fifth baronet.

=== 1963 ===
- Anderson of Harrold Priory (cr. 15 June 1920), extinct with the grantee's death on 11 April 1963.
- Cross of Marchbank Wood (cr. 5 July 1912), extinct with the death of the third baronet.
- Cunningham of Hyndhope (cr. 7 July 1942), extinct with the grantee's death on 12 June 1963.
- Hindley of Meads (cr. 18 February 1927), extinct with the grantee's death on 5 January 1963.
- Hollins of Greyfriars (cr. 29 November 1907), extinct with the death of the third baronet.
- Morris of Nuffield (cr. 27 March 1929), extinct with the grantee's death on 22 August 1963.
- Murphy of Wyckham (cr. 3 February 1912), extinct with the death of the second baronet.
- Price of Ardingly (cr. 2 July 1953), extinct with the grantee's death.
- Pryce-Jones of Dolerw (cr. 4 July 1918), extinct with the death of the second baronet.

=== 1964 ===
- David of Bombay (cr. 12 December 1911), extinct with the death of the second baronet.
- Duncan of Horsforth Hall (cr. 9 December 1905), extinct with the death of the third baronet.
- Lett of Walmer (cr. 31 January 1941), extinct with the grantee's death on 19 July 1964.
- Octerlony of Ochterlony (cr. 8 December 1823), extinct with the death of the fifth baronet.

=== 1965 ===
- Burrard of Walhampton (cr. 3 April 1769), extinct with the death of the eighth baronet.
- Jardine of Nottingham (cr. 22 May 1919), extinct with the death of the second baronet.
- Jarvis of Hascombe Court (cr. 24 January 1922), extinct with the death of the second baronet.
- Locock of Speldhurst and Hertford Street (cr. 8 May 1857), extinct with the death of the third baronet.
- Steel-Maitland later Ramsay-Steel-Maitland, (cr. 30 March 1935), extinct with the death of the third baronet.

=== 1966 ===
- Boynton of Barmston (cr. 15 May 1618), extinct with the death of the thirteenth baronet.
- Butcher of Holland (cr. 22 July 1960), extinct with the grantee's death on 11 May 1966.
- Colman of Reigate (cr. 29 January 1952), extinct with the grantee's death on 7 March 1966.
- Greene of Nether Hall (cr. 21 June 1900) extinct with the death of the third baronet.
- Wells of Hove (cr. 30 November 1948), extinct with the grantee's death.

=== 1967 ===
- Aylwen baronets of St Bartholomew's (cr. 25 November 1949), extinct with the grantee's death.
- Lee of Lukyns (cr. 30 January 1941), extinct with the grantee's death.

=== 1968 ===
- Cameron of Balclutha (cr. 27 August 1893), extinct with the death of the second baronet.
- Cohen of Highfield (cr. 19 December 1905), extinct with the death of the second baronet.
- Cross of Bolton-le-Moors (cr. 15 August 1941), extinct with the grantee's death on 3 June 1968.
- de Capell Brooke of Oakley (cr. 20 June 1803), extinct with the death of the sixth baronet.
- Layland-Barratt of the Manor House and of Tregarne Lodge (cr. 23 July 1908), extinct with the death of the second baronet.
- Mowat of Cleckheaton (cr. 25 June 1932), extinct with the death of the second baronet.
- Poynter of Albert Gate (cr. 2 August 1902), extinct with the death of the third baronet.

=== 1969 ===
- Cain of Wargrave (cr. 29 January 1920), extinct with the death of the second baronet.
- Douglas of Maxwell (cr. 17 June 1786), extinct with the death of the sixth baronet on 16 July 1969.
- Hampson of Taplow (cr. 3 June 1642), extinct with the death of the twelfth baronet.
- Monson of Thatched House Lodge (cr. 23 February 1905), extinct with the death of the fourth baronet.
- Tangye of Glendorgal (cr. 10 July 1912), extinct with the death of the second baronet.

=== 1970 ===
- Alison of Possil House (cr. 25 June 1852), extinct with the death of the fifth baronet.
- Bilsland of Park Circus (cr. 25 November 1907), extinct with the death of the second baronet on 10 December 1970.
- Dundas of Arniston (cr. 18 June 1898), extinct with the death of the seventh baronet.
- Evans of Tubbendens (cr. 26 July 1902), extinct with the death of the third baronet.
- Hart of Kilmoriarty (cr. 17 July 1893), extinct with the death of the third baronet.
- Rees of Aylwards Chase (cr. 8 May 1919), extinct with the death second baronet on 24 July 1970.
- Rowland of Taunton (cr. 20 November 1950), extinct with the death of the second baronet.
- Sturdee of the Falkland Islands (cr. 19 January 1916), extinct with the death of the second baronet.
- Twysden of Roydon (cr. 29 June 1611), extinct with the death of the twelfth baronet on 17 February 1970.

=== 1971 ===
- Dalrymple of New Hailes (cr. 19 July 1887), extinct with the death of the third baronet on 29 June 1971.
- Caine Baronet (cr. 1937), extinct with the grantee's death on 2 December 1971.
- Godfrey of Bushfield (cr. 17 June 1785), extinct with the death of the seventh baronet.
- Hornby of Brookhouse (cr. 21 February 1899), extinct with the death of the second baronet.
- Middlebrook of Oakwell (cr. 4 February 1930), extinct with the death of the second baronet.
- Moore of Kyleburn (cr. 20 September 1956), extinct with the grantee's death on 9 April 1971.
- Nussey of Rushwood Hall (cr. 22 July 1909), extinct with the death of the second baronet.
- Worthington-Evans of Colchester (cr. 15 November 1916), extinct with the death of the second baronet.

=== 1972 ===
- Cope of Hanwell (cr. 29 June 1611), extinct with the death of the sixteenth baronet.
- Hutchison of Hardiston (cr. 23 July 1923), extinct with the death of the second baronet.
- Lane of Cavendish Square (cr. 19 June 1913), extinct with the death of the second baronet.
- Molyneux of Sefton (cr. 22 May 1611), extinct with the death of the fifteenth baronet.
- Paul of Rodborough (cr. 3 September 1821), extinct with the death of the sixth baronet.
- Taylor of Cawthorne (cr. 26 January 1963), extinct with the grantee's death on 26 July 1972.
- Thomas of Yapton (cr. 6 September 1766), extinct with the death of the seventh baronet on 23 July 1972.

=== 1973 ===
- Ellerman of Connaught Square (cr. 11 December 1905), extinct with the death of the second baronet.
- Lawson of Knavesmire Lodge (cr. 26 December 1905), extinct with the death of the second baronet.
- Norie-Miller of Cleeve (cr. 7 February 1936), extinct with the death of the second baronet.
- Selby-Bigge of King's Sutton (cr. 14 February 1919), extinct with the death of the second baronet.
- Ward of Wilbraham Place (cr. 20 January 1914), extinct with the death of the third baronet.
- Wernher of Luton Hoo (cr. 2 August 1905), extinct with the death of the third baronet on 30 June 1973.

=== 1974 ===
- Dawson of Appleton Roebuck (cr. 2 July 1929), extinct with the death of the second baronet.
- Duncan of Jordanstone (cr. 14 June 1957), extinct with the grantee's death on 30 September 1974.
- Goldney of Beechfield and Bradenstoke Abbey (cr. 11 May 1880), extinct with the death of the fourth baronet on 26 February 1974.
- McCullagh of Lismarra (cr. 1 July 1935), extinct with the death of the second baronet.
- Porter of Frimley (cr. 27 June 1889), extinct with the death of the third baronet.
- Spears of Warfield (cr. 30 June 1953), extinct with the grantee's death on 27 January 1974.
- Wood of Hengrave (cr. 14 February 1918), extinct with the death of the second baronet.

=== 1975 ===
- Blake of Langham (cr. 8 October 1772), extinct with the death of the sixth baronet.
- Charles of The Abbey Grange and Manchester Square (cr. 20 March 1928), extinct with the death of the third baronet.
- Dering of Surrenden Dering, Kent (cr. 1 February 1626), extinct with the death of the twelfth baronet on 16 March 1975.
- Hawkey of Woodford (cr. 5 July 1945), extinct with the death of the second baronet.
- Mappin of Thornbury (cr. 27 August 1886), extinct with the death of the sixth baronet.
- Verner of Verner's Bridge (cr. 22 July 1846), extinct with the death of the sixth baronet on 27 March 1975.

=== 1976 ===
- Beauchamp of Grosvenor Place (cr. 27 June 1911), extinct with the death of second baronet on 25 August 1976.
- Byass of Port Talbot (cr. 30 January 1926), extinct with the death of the second baronet.
- Dunn of Bathurst (cr. 13 January 1921), extinct with the death of the second baronet.
- Gresley of Drakelow (cr. 29 June 1611), extinct with the death of the thirteenth baronet.
- Cunningham of Crookedstone (cr. 22 November 1963), extinct with the grantee's death on 29 July 1976.
- Lyle of Westbourne (cr. 22 June 1932), extinct with the death of the second baronet.
- Rose of Leith (cr. 2 July 1935), extinct with the death of the second baronet.
- Wilson-Drummond of Hawthornden (cr. 27 February 1828), extinct with the death of the sixth baronet.

=== 1978 ===
- Dimsdale of Goldsmiths and Lancaster Street (cr. 23 July 1902), extinct with the death of the third baronet.
- Harvey of Threadneedle Street (cr. 19 January 1933), extinct with the third baronet.
- Lewis of Essendon Place (cr. 11 February 1918), extinct with the death of the second baronet on 18 July 1978.
- Wingate of Dunbar and Port Sudan (cr. 6 July 1920), extinct with the death of the second baronet on 31 August 1978.

=== 1979 ===
- Barwick baronets of Ashbrooke Grange (cr. 1 February 1912), extinct with the death of the third baronet.
- Church of Woodside, Bellshill and Harley Street (cr. 28 June 1901), extinct with the death of the second baronet.
- Clark of Cavendish Square (cr. 9 August 1883), extinct the death of the third baronet.
- Findlay of Aberlour (cr. 25 June 1925), extinct with the death of the third baronet.
- Fraser of Ledeclune (cr. 27 November 1806), extinct with the death of the sixth baronet.
- Metcalfe of Chilton (cr. 21 December 1802), extinct with the death of the eighth baronet.
- Perks of Wykham Park (cr. 24 July 1908), extinct with the death of the second baronet.
- Stewart of Fingask (cr. 10 December 1920), extinct with the death of the second baronet.

=== 1980 ===
- Carmichael-Anstruther of Anstruther (cr. 18 May 1798), extinct with the death of the eighth baronet.
- Chamberlain of London (cr. 22 February 1828), extinct with the death of the fifth baronet on 24 December 1980.
- Champneys of Littlemeads (cr. 13 July 1910), extinct with the death of the second baronet.
- Duff of Vaynol Park, Carnarvon (cr. 1 August 1911), extinct 3 March 1980 with third baronet.
- Gunter of Wetherby Grange (cr. 18 April 1901), extinct with the death of the third baronet.
- Harmsworth of Moray Lodge (cr. 1 July 1918), extinct with the death of the third baronet.
- Hume-Williams of Ewhurst (cr. 28 November 1922), extinct with the death of the second baronet.
- Lennard of Wickham Court (cr. 6 May 1880), extinct with the death of the third baronet.
- Orr-Lewis of Whitewebbs Park (cr. 12 February 1920), extinct with the death of the second baronet.

=== 1981 ===
- Brocklehurst of Swythamley Park (cr. 27 August 1903), extinct with the death of the third baronet.
- Dundas of Beechwood (cr. 24 August 1821), extinct with the death of the sixth baronet.
- Richardson of Weybridge (cr. 26 July 1929), extinct with the death of the third baronet.
- Shore of Healthcote (cr. 27 October 1792), extinct with the death of the seventh baronet.
- Simpson of Bradley Hall (cr. 1 February 1935), extinct with the death of the third baronet.

=== 1982 ===
- Bolton of West Plean (cr. 25 Jan 1927), extinct the death of the second baronet.
- Pearson of St Dunstan's (cr. 12 July 1916), extinct with the death of the second baronet on 6 November 1982.

=== 1983 ===
- Beauchamp of Woodborough (cr. 4 October 1918), extinct with the death of the second baronet.
- Evans of Rottingdean (cr. 21 November 1963), extinct with the grantee's death.
- Macpherson-Grant of Ballindalloch (cr. 25 July 1838), extinct with the death of the sixth baronet.
- Mitchell of Tulliallan and Luscar (cr. 6 September 1945), extinct with the grantee's death on 8 April 1983.
- Watson of Sulhamstead (cr. 11 July 1912), extinct with the death of the second baronet.

=== 1984 ===
- Campbell of Milltown (cr. 10 January 1917), extinct with the death of the fourth baronet.
- Pechell of Paglesham (cr. 1 March 1797), extinct with the death of the ninth baronet.
- Stern of Strawberry Hill (cr. 31 July 1905), extinct with the death of the second baronet.

=== 1985 ===
- Flavelle of Toronto (cr. 18 July 1917), extinct with the death of the third baronet.
- Langman of Eaton Square (cr. 21 July 1906), extinct with the death of the third baronet.
- Waechter of Ramsnest (cr. 13 February 1911), extinct with the death of the second baronet.

=== 1986 ===
- Douglas of Glenbervie (cr. 30 September 1831), extinct with the death of the fifth baronet on 9 June 1986.
- Hoare of Fleet Street (cr. 6 December 1962), extinct with the grantee's death.
- Lambert of Beau Parc (cr. 3 July 1911), extinct with the death of the third baronet.
- Nicholson of Luddenham (cr. 8 April 1859), extinct with the death of the third baronet.
- Ramsay of Bamff (cr. 3 December 1666), extinct with the death of the twelfth baronet.

=== 1987 ===
- D'Avigdor Goldsmid of Somerhill (cr. 22 January 1934), extinct with the death of the third baronet on 6 September 1987.
- Fraser of Dineiddwg (cr. 16 January 1961), extinct with the death of the second baronet on 5 May 1987.
- Fry of Woodburn (cr. 6 February 1894), extinct with the death of the fifth baronet.
- Hooper of Tenterden (cr. 11 July 1962), extinct with the death of the second baronet.
- Middlemore of Selly Oak (cr. 27 May 1919), extinct with the death of the second baronet.
- Stephen of De Vere Gardens (cr. 29 June 1891), extinct with the death of the fourth baronet.

=== 1988 ===
- Adair of Flixton Hall, Suffolk (cr. 2 August 1838), extinct with the death of sixth baronet on 4 August 1988.
- Readhead of Westoe (cr. 20 January 1922), extinct with the death of the third baronet.

=== 1990 ===
- Harmood-Banner of Liverpool (cr. 26 February 1924), extinct with the death of the third baronet.
- Houldsworth of Heckmondwike (cr. 25 January 1956), extinct with the death of the second baronet.
- Mellor of Culmhead (cr. 24 January 1924), extinct with the death of the third baronet.

=== 1991 ===
- Blades of Cobham (cr. 14 January 1922), extinct with the death of the second baronet.
- Mathias of Vaendre Hall (cr. 28 June 1917), extinct with the death of the second baronet.
- Nicholson of Winterbourne Roy (cr. 21 March 1958), extinct with the grantee's death on 14 July 1991.
- Ritchie of Highlands (cr. 23 January 1918), extinct with the death of the second baronet.

=== 1992 ===
- Benn of Rollesby (cr. 17 June 1920), extinct with the death of the second baronet.
- Fraser of Cromarty and Vale Avenue (cr. 29 June 1921), extinct with the death of the second baronet.
- Hamilton of Ilford (cr. 10 June 1937), extinct with the death of the second baronet.
- Moore of Colchester (cr. 25 October 1923), extinct with the death of the second baronet.
- Younger of Fountainbridge (cr. February 1964), extinct with the death of the grantee.

=== 1993 ===
- Christison of Moray Place (cr. 28 November 1871), extinct with the death of the fourth baronet on 21 December 1993.
- Hope of Kinnettles (cr. 13 January 1932), extinct with the death of the third baronet.
- Hulton of Hulton Park (cr. 23 December 1905), extinct with the death of the fourth baronet.
- Summers of Shotton (cr. 2 February 1952), extinct with the death of the second baronet.

=== 1994 ===
- Astley of Everley (cr. 15 August 1821), extinct with the death of the sixth baronet.
- Llewellyn of Baglan (cr. 20 January 1959), extinct with the death of the second baronet.
- Neville of Sloley (cr. 2 July 1927), extinct with the death of the third baronet.
- Nugent of Dunsfold (cr. 27 January 1960), extinct with the grantee's death on 16 March 1994.
- Winn of Nostel (cr. 3 December 1660), extinct with the death of the thirteenth baronet.

=== 1995 ===
- Erskine of Rerrick (cr. 5 July 1961), extinct with the death of the second baronet.
- Wallace of Braywick Lodge (cr. 30 May 1815), extinct with the death of the seventh baronet on 22 January 1995.

=== 1996 ===
- Corbet of Moreton Corbet (cr. 3 October 1828), extinct with the death of the seventh baronet.
- Hanson of Bryanston Square (cr. 6 June 1887), extinct with the death of the fourth baronet.
- Harris of Cheeping Wycombe (cr. 24 January 1953), extinct with the death of the second baronet.
- Kitson of Gledhow (cr. 28 August 1886), extinct with the death of the fourth baronet.
- Levy of Humberstone Hall (cr. 4 February 1913), extinct with the death of the second baronet.
- Schuster of Collingham Road (cr. 24 July 1906), extinct with the death of the third baronet.

=== 1997 ===
- Bethune of Scotscraig (cr. 21 July 1683), extinct with the death of the tenth baronet.
- Gibson of Great Warley (cr. 1 February 1926), extinct with the death of the fourth baronet.
- Gough of Edgbaston (cr. 6 April 1728), extinct with the death of the eleventh baronet.
- Holland of Westwell Manor (cr. 17 February 1917), extinct with the death of the third baronet.

=== 1998 ===
- Roll of The Chestnuts (cr. 4 November 1921), extinct with the death of the fourth baronet.

=== 1999 ===
- Butt of Westminster (cr. 25 July 1929), extinct with the death of the second baronet.
- Cayzer of Roffey Park (cr. 7 January 1921), extinct the death of the second baronet.
- Edwards of Treforis (cr. 30 June 1921), extinct with the death of the second baronet.
- Hermon-Hodge of Wyfold Court (cr. 24 July 1902), extinct with the death of the third baronet.
- Kennard of Fernhill (cr. 11 February 1891), extinct with the death of the third baronet.
- Makins of Rotherfield Court (cr. 9 January 1903), extinct with the death of the fourth baronet.
- Middleton of Belsay Castle, Northumberland (cr. 24 October 1662), extinct with the death of the tenth baronet.
- Stewart of Stewartby (cr. 4 March 1937), extinct with the death of the second baronet.

=== 2002 ===
- Meysey-Thompson of Kirby Hall (cr. 26 March 1874), extinct with the death of the fourth baronet.
- Nepean of Bothenhampton (cr. 16 July 1802), extinct with the death of the sixth baronet.
- Owen of Orielton (cr. 12 January 1813), extinct with the death of the fifth baronet.

=== 2003 ===
- Abercromby of Birkenbog (cr. 20 February 1636), extinct with the death of the tenth baronet.
- Bowman of Holmbury St Mary (cr. 23 January 1884), extinct with the death of the fifth baronet.
- Greenwood of Onslow Gardens (cr. 8 February 1915), extinct with the death of the third baronet.

=== 2004 ===
- Blount of Sodington (cr. 5 October 1642), extinct with the death of the twelfth baronet.
- Colyer-Fergusson of Spitalhaugh (cr. 23 January 1866), extinct with the death of the fourth baronet.
- Larcom baronets (cr. 24 December 1868), extinct with the death of the fifth baronet.
- Lewthwaite of Broadgate (cr. 26 January 1927), extinct with the death of the fifth baronet.
- Richardson of Eccleshall (cr. 20 November 1963), extinct with the grantee's death on 15 August 2004.

=== 2005 ===
- Ganzoni of Ipswich (cr. 22 March 1929), extinct with the death of the second baronet on 3 December 2005.

=== 2006 ===
- Bateson of Belvoir Park (cr. 18 December 1818), extinct with the death of the seventh baronet on 20 August 2006.
- Brickwood of Portsmouth (cr. 29 June 1927), extinct with the death of the third baronet.

=== 2007 ===
- Echlin of Clonagh (cr. 17 October 1721), extinct with the death of the tenth baronet.
- Prince-Smith of Hillbrook (cr. 11 February 1911), extinct with the death of the fourth baronet.

=== 2008 ===
- Frankland-Payne-Gallwey (cr. 8 December 1812), extinct with the death of the sixth baronet.
- Hamilton of Marlborough House (cr. 26 January 1819), extinct with the death of the fifth baronet.
- Hamilton of Trebinshun House (cr. 26 August 1776), extinct with the death of the seventh baronet.
- Wakeman of Perdiswell (cr. 20 February 1828), extinct with the death of the sixth baronet on 25 November 2008.

=== 2009 ===
- Lawes of Rothamsted (cr. 19 May 1882), extinct with the death of the fifth baronet.
- Thomas of Garreglwyd (cr. 5 July 1918), extinct with the death of the third baronet.

=== 2010 ===
- Wolfson of St Marylebone (cr. 19 February 1962), extinct with the death of the second baronet on 20 May 2010.

=== 2011 ===
- Perceval, of Kanturk (cr. 9 September 1661), extinct with the death of the sixteenth baronet.
- Quin, of Adare (cr. 24 March 1781), extinct with the death of the seventh baronet.

=== 2012 ===
- Reade of Barton (cr. 4 March 1661), extinct with the death of the thirteenth baronet.
- Reid of Springburn and Kilmaurs (cr. 26 January 1922), extinct with the death of the third baronet.
- Williams of Castell Deudraeth and Borthwen (cr. 28 July 1909), extinct with the death of the second baronet.

=== 2013 ===
- Dupree of Craneswater (cr. 24 January 1921), extinct with the death of the sixth baronet.
- Staples of Lissan (cr. 18 July 1628), extinct with the death of the seventeenth baronet.

=== 2015 ===
- Dodds of West Chiltington (cr. 10 February 1964), extinct with the death of the second baronet on 24 May 2015.
- Hawley of Leybourne Grange (cr. 14 March 1795), extinct with the death of the 8th baronet.
- White of Boulge Hall (cr. 14 June 1937), extinct with the death of the third baronet.

=== 2016 ===
- Watson of Earnock (cr. 15 July 1895), extinct with the death of the seventh baronet on 3 May 2016.

=== 2017 ===
- Campbell of Succoth (cr. 17 September 1808), extinct with the death of the seventh baronet on 2 January 2017.
- De la Bere of Crowborough (cr. 18 November 1953), extinct with the death of the third baronet on 10 February 2017
- Evans of Wightwick (cr. 31 January 1920), extinct with the death of the second baronet on 30 August 2017.
- Fayrer of Devonshire Street (cr. 11 February 1896), extinct with the death of the fourth baronet on 9 March 2017.
- Hardy of Dunstall Hall (cr. 23 February 1876), extinct with the death of the fifth baronet on 10 November 2017.
- Lyell of Kinnordy (cr. 27 January 1894), extinct with the death of the third baronet on 10 January 2017.

=== 2018 ===
- Mond of Hartford Hill (cr. 8 July 1910), extinct with the death of the fourth baronet on 31 August 2018.
- Williams of Bodelwyddan (cr. 24 July 1798), extinct with the death of the ninth baronet on 19 April 2018.

=== 2019 ===
- Forwood of The Priory (cr. 5 September 1895), extinct with the death of the fourth baronet on 12 September 2019.
- Walsham of Knill Court (cr. 30 September 1831), extinct with the death of the sixth baronet.

=== 2020 ===
- Graham of Dromore (cr. 23 January 1964), extinct with the death of the second baronet on 2 November 2020.
- Hay of Park (cr. 25 August 1663), extinct with the death of the eleventh baronet on 9 June 2020.
- Pigott-Brown of Broome Hall (cr. 5 January 1903), extinct with the death of the third baronet on 1 June 2020.
- Oppenheimer of Stoke Poges (cr. 18 January 1921), extinct with the death of the third baronet on 17 April 2020.

=== 2021 ===
- Black of Midgham (cr. 19 June 1922), extinct with the death of the third baronet on 22 May 2021.
- Lever of Hans Crescent (cr. 6 July 1911), extinct with the death of the third baronet on 28 October 2021.
- Medlycott of Ven House (cr. 3 October 1808), extinct with the death of the ninth baronet on 22 June 2021.

=== 2022 ===
- Latham of Crow Clump (cr. 24 May 1919), extinct with the death of the third baronet on 26 June 2022.
- Stewart of Strathgarry (cr. 17 August 1960), extinct with the death of the third baronet on 13 February 2022.

== Reign of King Charles III ==
=== 2022 ===
- Mowbray of Warennes Wood (cr. 3 May 1880), extinct with the death of the sixth baronet on 15 September 2022.

=== 2023 ===
- Gough of Synone and Drangan (cr. 23 December 1842), extinct with the death of the fifth baronet on 14 April 2023.
- Lawrence of the Army (cr. 16 August 1858), extinct with the death of the fifth baronet on 14 August 2023.

=== 2025 ===
- Dunning of Beedinglee (cr. 4 June 1930), extinct with the death of the third baronet on 28 January 2025.
- Craig of Craigavon (cr. 5 February 1918), extinct with the death of the third baronet on 31 March 2025.
- Clifford of Flaxbourne (cr. 16 July 1887), extinct with the death of the seventh baronet on 31 March 2025.
- Carden of Molesey (cr. 14 June 1887), extinct with the death of the fifth baronet on 5 December 2025.

=== 2026 ===
- Ohlson of Scarborough (cr. 24 January 1920), extinct with the death of the fourth baronet on 17 January 2026.
- Phillips of Tylney Hal (cr. 10 February 1912), extinct with the death of the third baronet on 10 February 2026.
- Craufurd of Kilbirney (cr. 8 June 1781), extinct with the death of ninth baronet on 8 October 2026.
