= List of baronetcies in the Baronetage of England =

Peerages and baronetcies of Britain and Ireland
Extant	All
Dukes	Dukedoms
Marquesses	Marquessates
Earls	Earldoms
Viscounts	Viscountcies
Barons	Baronies
Baronets	Baronetcies
En, Ire, NS, GB, UK (extinct)

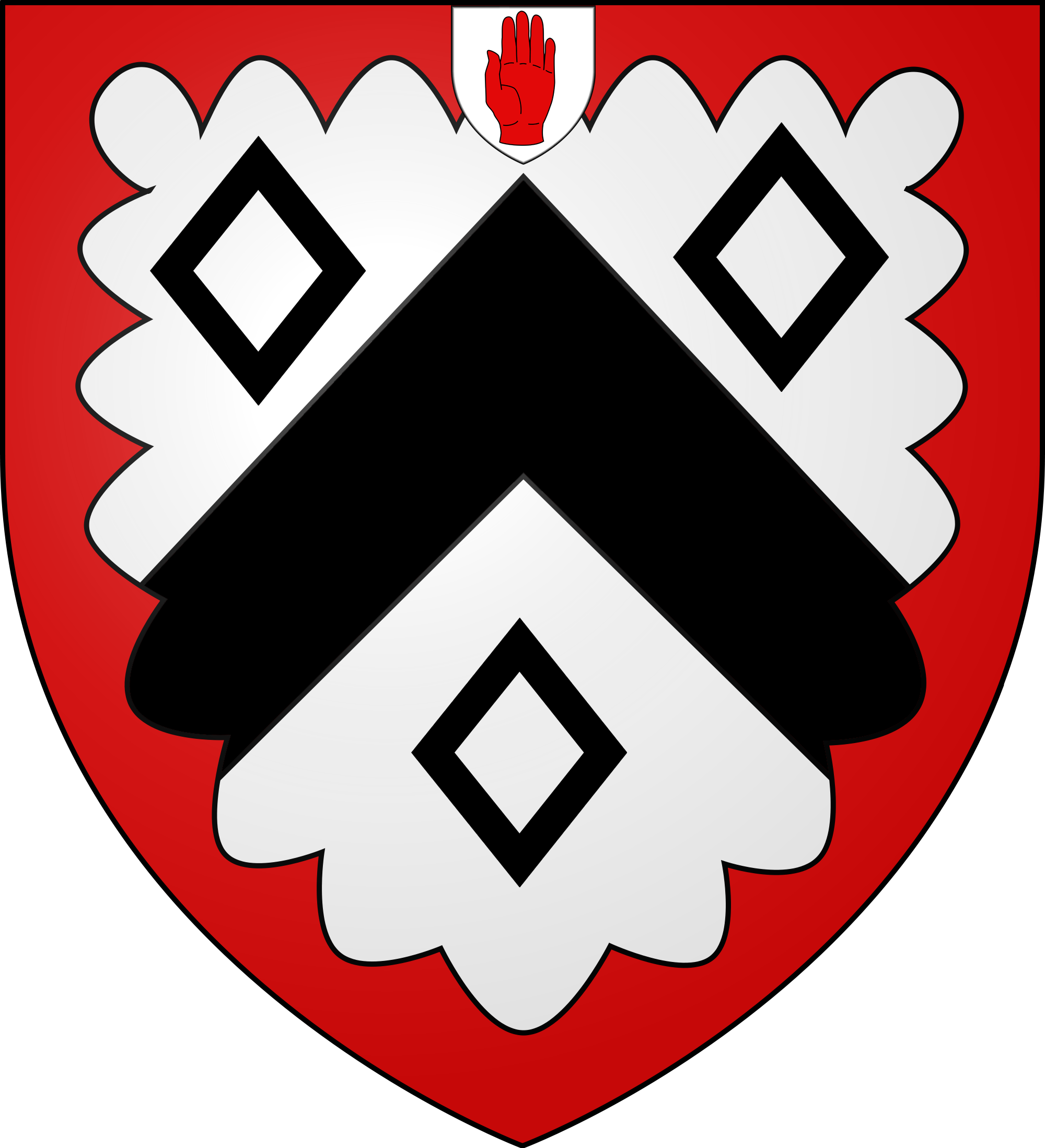
Coat of Arms of the Martin baronets of Long Melford (1667) with the badge of a Baronet of England.

This is a list of baronetcies in the Baronetage of England. The first Baronetage was created in 1611. The Baronetage of England was replaced by the Baronetage of Great Britain in 1707.

This list is not currently complete. For a more complete list, click here.

== A ==
Title	Date of creation	Surname	Current status	Notes
Abdy of Albyns	1660	Abdy	extinct 1759	
Abdy of Felix Hall	1641	Abdy	extinct 1868	
Abdy of Moores	1660	Abdy	extinct 1662	
Acland of Columb John	1678	Acland, Dyke-Acland	extant	precedence of 1644
Acton of Aldenham	1644	Acton	extant	created Baron Acton (1869) in the Peerage of the United Kingdom.
Acton of London	1629	Acton	extinct 1651	
Adams of London	1660	Adams	extinct 1770	
Agnew of Lochnaw Castle	1629	Agnew	extant	
Airmine of Osgodby	1619	Airmine	extinct 1668	
Allen of London	1660	Allen	extinct 1730	
Alleyn of Hatfield	1629	Alleyn	extinct 1759	
Allin of Blundeston	1673	Allin	extinct 1696	
Allin of Somerlytown	1699	Allin	extinct 1794	
Alston of Chelsea	1682	Alston	extinct 1819	
Alston of Odell	1642	Alston	extinct 1791	
Anderson of Broughton	1660	Anderson	extinct 1891	
Anderson of Eyworth	1664	Anderson	extinct 1773	
Anderson of Penley	1643	Anderson	extinct 1699	
Anderson of St Ives	1629	Anderson	extinct 1630	
Anderton of Lostock	1677	Anderton	extinct 1760	
Andrews of Doddington	1641	Andrews	extinct 1804	
Andrews of Lathbury	1661	Andrews	extinct 1696	
Appleton of South Bemfleet	1611	Appleton	extinct 1708	
Armytage of Kirklees	1641	Armytage	extinct 1737	
Ashburnham of Bromham	1661	Ashburnham	extant	
Ashby of Harefield	1622	Ashby	extinct 1623	
Ashe of Twickenham	1660	Ashe	extinct 1733	
Ashfield of Netherhall	1626	Ashfield	extinct 1714	
Ashley of Wimbourne	1622	Ashley	extinct 1628	
Ashurst of Waterstock	1688	Ashurst	extinct 1732	
Assheton of Lever	1620	Assheton	extinct 1696	
Assheton of Middleton	1660	Assheton	extinct 1765	
Astley of Hill Morton	1660	Astley	extant	sixth Baronet succeeded as Baron Hastings in 1841.
Astley of Melton Constable	1642	Astley	extinct 1659	
Astley of Pateshull	1662	Astley	extinct 1772	
Aston of Aston	1628	Aston	extinct 1815	
Aston of Tixhall	1611	Aston	extinct 1751	
Aston of Tixhall	1611	Aston	extinct 1751	created Lord Aston of Forfar (1627) in the Peerage of Scotland.
Atkins of Clapham	1660	Atkins	extinct 1756	
Aubrey of Llantrithead	1660	Aubrey	extinct 1856	
Aucher of Bishopsbourne	1666	Aucher	extinct 1726	
Austen of Bexley	1660	Austen	extinct 1772	
Aylesbury of London	1627	Aylesbury	extinct 1657	
Ayloffe of Braxted Manor	1611	Ayloffe	extinct 1781	
Ayshcombe of Lyford	1696	Ayshcombe	extinct 1727	

== B ==
Title	Date of creation	Surname	Current status	Notes
Backhouse of London	1660	Backhouse	extinct 1669	
Bacon of Gillingham	1662	Bacon	extinct 1685	
Bacon of Mildenhall	1627	Bacon	extant	merged with Baronet Bacon of Redgrave in 1755.
Bacon of Redgrave	1611	Bacon	extant	also Baronet Bacon of Mildenhall in the Baronetage of England. Premier Baronet of England.
Badd of Cames Oysells	1643	Badd	extinct 1683	
Bagot of Blithfield	1627	Bagot	extant	sixth Baronet created Baron Bagot in 1780; baronetcy unproven as of 30 June 2006 (14th Baronet died 2001) – under review
Baker of Sisinghurst	1611	Baker	extinct 1661	
Bale of Carleton Curlieu	1643	Bale	extinct 1654	
Ball of Blofield	1672	Ball	extinct 1680	
Bamburgh of Howsham	1619	Bamburgh	extinct 1631	
Bampfylde of Poltimore	1641	Bampfylde	extant	created Baron Poltimore (1823) in the Peerage of the United Kingdom.
Banks of London	1661	Banks	extinct 1699	
Bard of Staines	1643	Bard	extinct 1660	created Viscount Bellomont (1645) in the Peerage of England.
Barker of Bocking Hall	1676	Barker	extinct 1818	
Barker of Grimston Hall	1622	Barker	extinct 1766	
Barker of Hambleton	1665	Barker	extinct 1707	
Barkham of South Acre	1623	Barkham	extinct 1695	
Barkham of Wainflete	1661	Barkham	extinct 1771	
Barlow of Slebetch	1677	Barlow	extinct 1756	
Barnardiston of Brightwell	1663	Barnardiston	extinct 1712	
Barnardiston of Ketton	1663	Barnardiston	extinct 1745	
Barnham of Broughton Monchelsey	1663	Barnham	extinct 1685	
Barrington of Barrington Hall	1611	Barrington	extinct 1832	
Bateman of How Hall	1664	Bateman	extinct 1685	
Bathurst of Lechlade	1643	Bathurst	dormant 1780	
Bayning of Bentley Parva	1611	Bayning	extinct 1638	created Baron Bayning of Horkesley (1628) and Viscount Bayning of Sudbury (1628) in England.
Beale of Maidstone	1660	Beale	extinct 1684	
Beaumont of Cole Orton	1619	Beaumont	extinct 1702	created Viscount Beaumont (1622) in Ireland.
Beaumont of Grace Dieu	1627	Beaumont	extinct 1686	
Beaumont of Stoughton Grange	1661	Beaumont	extinct 2011	
Beaumont of Whitley	1628	Beaumont	extinct 1631	
Beckwith of Aldborough	1681	Beckwith	dormant 1811	
Bedell of Hamerton	1622	Bedell	extinct 1643	
Bedingfeld of Oxburgh	1661	Bedingfeld, from 16 April 1830 Paston-Bedingfeld	extant	
Belasyse of Newborough	1611	Belasyse	extinct 1815	created Baron Fauconberg (1627) in England.
Bellingham of Hilsington	1620	Bellingham	extinct 1650	
Bellot of Moreton	1663	Bellot	extinct 1714	
Bendish of Steeple Bumpstead	1611	Bendish	extinct 1717	
Bennet of Babraham	1660	Bennet	extinct 1701	
Bennet of Bechampton	1627	Bennet	extinct 1631	
Berkeley of Bruton	1660	Berkeley	extinct 1690	merged with Viscount Fitzhardinge in 1668.
Berkeley of Wymondham	1611	Berkeley	extinct 1630	
Bernard of Huntingdon	1662	Bernard	extinct 1789	
Berney of Parkhall	1620	Berney	extant	
Betenson of Wimbledon	1663	Betenson	extinct 1786	
Bickley of Attleborough	1661	Bickley	extinct 1752	
Biddulph of Westcombe	1664	Biddulph	extant	
Biggs of Lenchwick	1620	Biggs	extinct 1621	
Bindlosse of Barwick	1641	Bindlosse	extinct 1688	
Bishopp of Parham	1620	Bishopp	extinct 1870	
Blackett of Matfen Hall	1673	Blackett	extant	
Blackett of Newcastle	1685	Blackett	extinct 1728	
Blackham of London	1696	Blackham	extinct 1728	
Blakiston of Blakiston	1615	Blakiston	extinct 1630	
Blakiston of Gibside	1642	Blakiston	extinct 1713	
Bland of Kippax Park	1642	Bland	extinct 1756	
Blois of Grundisburgh	1686	Blois	extant	
Blount of Sodington	1642	Blount	extant	
Blount of Tittenhanger	1680	Blount	extinct 1757	
Bolles of Scampton	1628	Bolles	extinct 1714	
Booth	1611	Booth	extinct 1797	created Baron Delamere (1661) and Earl of Warrington (1690) in England; titles extinct 1770 and 1758, respectively.
Boothby of Chingford	1660	Boothby	extinct 1699	
Boothby of Clater Cote	1644	Boothby	extant	new creation in 1660.
Boreel of Amsterdam	1645	Boreel	extant	
Borlase of Bockmer	1642	Borlase	extinct 1689	
Boteler of Bramfield	1643	Boteler	extinct 1657	
Boteler of Hatfield Woodhall	1620	Boteler	extinct 1647	created Baron Boteler (1628) in England.
Boteler of Teston	1641	Boteler	extinct 1772	
Boughton of Lawford	1641	Boughton, Rouse-Boughton	extinct 1963	also Baronet Boughton of Rouse Lench (1791).
Bovey of Hillfields	1660	Bovey	extinct 1679	
Bowyer-Smyth of Hill Hall	1661	Smith, Smyth, Bowyer-Smith, Bowyer-Smyth	extant	
Bowyer of Denham Court	1660	Bowyer	extant	also Bowyer of Denham Court (GB) (1794–1950); merged with Baron Denham in 1950.
Bowyer of Knipersley	1660	Bowyer	extinct 1702	
Bowyer of Leighthorne	1627	Bowyer	extinct 1680	
Boynton of Barmston	1618	Boynton	extinct 1966	
Bradshaigh of Haigh	1679	Bradshaigh	extinct 1779	
Braham of New Windsor	1662	Braham	extinct 1676	
Brereton of Hanford	1627	Brereton	extinct 1674	
Bridgeman of Great Lever	1660	Bridgeman	extant	created Baron Bradford (1794) in the Peerage of Great Britain and Earl of Bradford (1815) in the Peerage of the United Kingdom.
Bridgeman of Ridley	1673	Bridgeman	extinct 1740	
Brigges of Haughton	1641	Brigges	extinct 1767	
Bright of Badsworth	1660	Bright	extinct 1688	
Brograve of Hamells	1663	Brograve	extinct 1707	
Brograve of Worstead	1791	Brograve	extinct 1828	
Broke of Nacton	1661	Broke	extinct 1694	
Bromfield of Southwark	1661	Bromfield	dormant 1733	
Brooke of Norton	1662	Brooke	extant	
Brookes of York	1676	Brookes	extinct 1770	
Broughton of Broughton	1661	Broughton	dormant	baronetcy dormant as of 30 June 2006 (12th Baronet died 1993)
Brown of London	1699	Brown	extinct c.1760	
Browne of Bettesworth Castle	1627	Browne	extinct 1690	
Browne of Caversham	1665	Browne	extinct 1775	
Browne of Deptford	1649	Browne	extinct 1683	
Browne of Kiddington	1659	Browne	extinct 1754	
Browne of London	1660	Browne	extinct 1739	either extinct or dormant.
Browne of Walcot	1621	Browne	extinct 1662	
Brownlow of Belton	1641	Brownlow	extinct 1679	
Brownlow of Humby	1641	Brownlow	extinct 1754	created Viscount Tyrconnel (1718) in the Peerage of Ireland.
Brudenell of Deen	1611	Brudenell, Bruce	extant	created Baron Brudenell (1628) in the Peerage of England; merged with the Marquessate of Ailesbury.
Brydges of Wilton	1627	Brydges	extinct 1789	created Baron Chandos (1676) in the Peerage of England; merged with the Dukedom of Chandos.
Buck of Hamby	1660	Buck	extinct 1782	
Buckworth of Sheen	1697	Buckworth, Buckhurst-Herne, Buckworth-Herne-Soame	extant	
Bunbury of Bunbury	1681	Bunbury	extant	
Bunce of Otterden	1660	Bunce	extinct 1741	
Burdett of Bramcote	1619	Burdett	dormant 1951	
Burdett of Burthwaite	1665	Burdett	extant	
Burgoyne of Sutton	1641	Burgoyne	extinct 1921	
Burton of Stockerston	1622	Burton	extinct 1750	
Buswell of Clipston	1660	Buswell	extinct 1668	
Button of Alton	1622	Button	extinct 1712	

== C ==
Title	Date of creation	Surname	Current status	Notes
Cambell of Clay Hall	1664	Cambell	extinct 1699	
Cambell of Woodford	1661	Cambell	extinct 1662	
Cann of Compton Green	1662	Cann	extinct 1765	
Carew of Anthony	1641	Carew	extinct 1799	
Carew of Haccombe	1661	Carew	extant	
Carleton of Holcombe	1627	Carleton	extinct 1650	
Carpentier of France	1658	Carpentier	extinct	Elder branch created counts in the nobility of France in 1856 and Belgium in 1892.
Carr of Sleaford	1611	Carr	extinct 1695	
Carteret of Metesches	1645	Carteret	extinct 1776	created Baron Carteret (1681) in England.
Carteret of St Owen	1670	Carteret	extinct 1715	
Castleton of St Edmundsbury	1641	Castleton	extinct 1810	
Cave-Browne-Cave of Stanford	1641	Cave, Cave-Browne, Cave-Browne-Cave	extant	
Cayley of Brompton	1661	Cayley	extant	
Chaloner of Guisborough	1620	Chaloner	extinct 1641	
Chamberlayne of Wickham	1643	Chamberlayne	extinct 1776	
Charlton of Hesleyside	1646	Charlton	extinct 1674	
Charlton of Ludford	1686	Charlton	extinct 1784	
Chaytor of Croft Hall	1671	Chaytor	extinct 1721	
Chernock of Hullcot	1661	Chernock	extinct 1779	
Chester of Chicheley	1620	Chester	extinct 1769	
Chetwode of Oakley	1700	Chetwode	extant	created Baron Chetwode (1945) in the United Kingdom.
Chichester of Raleigh	1641	Chichester	extant	
Child of Wanstead	1678	Child	extinct 1784	created Viscount Castlemaine (1718) and Earl Tylney (1731) in Ireland.
Child of Surat	1685	Child	extinct 1753	
Cholmeley of Whitby	1641	Cholmeley	extinct 1689	
Cholmondeley of Cholmondeley	1611	Cholmondeley	extinct 1659	created Viscount Cholmondeley (1628) and Earl of Leinster (1645) in Ireland.
Chudleigh of Ashton	1622	Chudleigh	extinct 1745	
Chute of Hinxhill Place	1684	Chute	extinct 1722	
Clarges of St Martins in the Fields	1674	Clarges	extinct 1834	
Clarke of Salford Shirland	1617	Clarke	extinct 1898	
Clarke of Snailwell	1698	Clarke	extinct 1806	
Clavering of Axwell	1661	Clavering	extinct 1893	
Clere of Ormesby	1621	Clere	extinct 1622	
Clerke of Hitcham	1660	Clerke	extant	
Clerke of Launde Abbey	1661	Clerke	extinct 1759	
Clifton of Clifton	1611	Clifton	extinct 1869	
Clifton of Clifton	1661	Clifton	extinct 1694	
Cobb of Adderbury	1662	Cobb	extinct 1762	
Cocks of Dumbleton	1662	Cocks	extinct 1765	
Cokayne of Ashbourne Hall	1642	Cokayne	extinct 1684	
Coke of Longford	1641	Coke	extinct 1727	
Colbrand of Boreham	1621	Colbrand	extinct 1709	
Cole of Brancepeth	1641	Cole	extinct 1720	
Colleton of London	1661	Colleton	extinct 1938	
Colt of Westminster	1694	Colt	extant	
Colyear of Holland	1677	Colyear	extinct 1835	created Lord Portmore (1699) and Earl of Portmore (1703) in Scotland.
Compton of Hartbury	1686	Compton	extinct 1773	
Constable of Everingham	1642	Constable	extinct 1746	
Constable of Flamborough	1611	Constable	extinct 1655	
Conway of Bodrythan	1660	Conway	extinct 1721	
Conyers of Horden	1628	Conyers	extinct 1810	
Cook of Brome Hall	1663	Cook	extinct 1708	
Cooke of Wheatley	1661	Cooke	extant	
Cookes of Norgrove	1664	Cookes	extinct 1701	
Cooper of Rockbourne	1622	Cooper, Ashley-Cooper	extant	created Baron Ashley (1661) and Earl of Shaftesbury (1672) in the Peerage of England.
Cope of Bramshill	1611	Cope	extinct 1972	
Copley of Sprotborough	1661	Copley	extinct 1709	
Corbet of Moreton Corbet	1642	Corbet	extinct 1688	
Corbet of Sprowston	1623	Corbet	extinct 1661	
Corbet of Stoke	1627	Corbet	extinct 1750	
Corbet of Leighton	1642	Corbet	extinct 1774	
Cordell of Long Melford	1660	Cordell	extinct 1704	
Cornwallis of Brome	1627	Cornwallis	extinct 1852	created Baron Cornwallis (1661) in the Peerage of England; created the Earl Cornwallis (1753) and Marquess Cornwallis (1792) in the Peerage of Great Britain.
Coryton of Newton	1662	Coryton	extinct 1739	
Cottington of Hanworth	1623	Cottington	extinct 1652	created Baron Cottington (1631) in the Peerage of England.
Cotton of Combermere	1677	Cotton, Stapleton-Cotton	extant	created Baron Combermere (1814) and Viscount Combermere (1827) in the United Kingdom.
Cotton of Connington	1611	Cotton	extinct 1752	
Cotton of Landwade	1641	Cotton	extinct 1863	
Courten of Aldington	1622	Courten	extinct 1624	
Courtenay	1644	Courtenay	extant	merged with the Earl of Devon
Covert of Slaugham	1660	Covert	extinct 1679	
Cowper of Ratlingcourt	1642	Cowper	extinct 1905	created Baron Cowper (1706) in the Peerage of England and Earl Cowper (1718) in the Peerage of Great Britain.
Crane of Chilton	1627	Crane	extinct 1643	
Crane of Woodrising	1643	Crane	extinct 1645	
Craven of Spersholt	1661	Crane	extinct 1713	
Crispe of Hammersmith	1665	Crisp	extinct 1740	
Croft of Croft Castle	1671	Croft	extant	
Crofts of Stow	1661	Crofts	extinct 1664	
Croke of Chilton	1642	Croke	extinct 1728	
Cropley of Clerkenwell	1661	Cropley	extinct 1713	
Crowe of Llanherne	1627	Crowe	extinct 1706	
Cullen of East Sheen	1661	Cullen	extinct 1730	
Cullum of Hastede	1660	Cullum	extinct 1855	
Culpeper of Preston Hall	1627	Culpeper	extinct 1723	
Culpeper of Wakehurst	1628	Colpeper	extinct 1740	
Curll of Soberton	1678	Curll	extinct 1679	
Curson of Water Perry	1661	Curson	extinct 1765	
Curtius of Sweden	1652	Curtius	extinct 1823	
Curwen of Warkington	1627	Curwen	extinct 1664	
Curzon of Kedleston	1641	Curzon	extant	created Baron Scarsdale (1761) in Great Britain; created Viscount Scarsdale (1911) in the United Kingdom. Also Curzon of Kedleston in Nova Scotia.
Cust of Stamford	1677	Cust	extant	created Baron Brownlow (1776) in Great Britain.
Cutler of London	1660	Cutler	extinct 1693	
Cutts of Childerley	1660	Cutts	extinct 1670	

== D ==
Title	Date of creation	Surname	Current status	Notes
D'Ewes of Stowlangtoft	1641	D'Ewes	extinct 1731	
D'Oyly of Chislehampton	1666	D'Oyly	extinct 1773	
D'Oyly of Shottisham	1663	D'Oyly	extant	
Dalison of Luoghton	1624	Dalison	extinct 1645	
Dallison of Greetwell	1644	Dallison	extinct 1720	
Dalston of Dalston	1641	Dalston	extinct 1765	
Danvers of Culworth	1643	Danvers	extinct 1776	
Darcy of St Osiths	1660	Darcy	extinct 1698	
Darell of West Woodhey	1622	Darell	extinct 1657	
Darnell of Heyling	1621	Darnell	extinct 1638	
Dashwood of Kirtlington	1684	Dashwood	extant	
Davers of Rougham	1682	Davers	dormant 1806	
Davie of Creedy	1641	Davie	extinct 1846	
Davies of London	1686	Davies	extinct 1705	
Dawes of Putney	1663	Dawes	extinct 1741	
Dawnay of Cowick	1642	Dawnay	extinct 1644	
De Raedt of the Hague	1660	De Raedt	dormant	surname may have changed to Rhett
De Vic of Guernesy	1649	De Vic	extinct 1688	
Delaval of Seaton	1660	Delaval	dormant 1729	
Delves of Dodington	1621	Delves	extinct 1727	
Denny of Castle More	1642	Denny	extinct 1676	
Denton of Hillersdon	1699	Denton	extinct 1714	
Dereham of West Dereham	1661	Dereham	extinct 1739	
Dering of Surrenden Dering	1627	Dering	extinct 1975	
Devereux of Castle Bromwich	1611	Devereux	extant	merged with the Viscountcy of Hereford in 1646.
Diggs of Chilham Castle	1666	Diggs	extinct 1672	
Dillington of Knighton	1628	Dillington	extinct 1721	
Dixie of Bosworth	1660	Dixie	extinct 1975	
Dixwell of Broomehouse	1660	Dixwell	extinct 1750	
Dixwell of Tirlingham	1628	Dixwell	extinct 1642	
Dolben of Findon	1704	Dolben	extinct 1837	
Dormer of Wing	1615	Dormer	extant	created Baron Dormer (1615) in the Peerage of England.
Downing of East Hatley	1663	Downing	extinct 1764	
Drake of Ashe	1660	Drake	extinct 1733	
Drake of Buckland	1622	Drake	extinct 1810	
Drake of Shardeloes	1641	Drake	extinct 1669	
Draper of Sunninghill	1660	Draper	extinct 1703	
Drury of Riddlesworth	1627	Drury	extinct 1712	
Dryden of Canons Ashby	1619	Dryden	extinct 1770	
Ducie of London	1629	Ducie	extinct 1703	
Duck of Haswell-on-the-Hill	1687	Duck	extinct 1691	
Duddlestone of Bristol	1692	Duddlestone	extinct 1750	
Dudley of Clapton	1660	Dudley	extinct 1764	
Duke of Benhall	1661	Duke	extinct 1732	
Dukinfield of Dukinfield	1665	Dukinfield	extinct 1858	
Duncombe of Tangley Park	1662	Duncombe	extinct 1706	
Dutton of Sherborne	1678	Dutton	extinct 1743	
Dycer of Uphall	1661	Dycer	extinct 1676	
Dyer of Staughton	1627	Dyer	extinct 1669	
Dyer of Tottenham	1678	Dyer, Swinnerton-Dyer	extant	
Dyke of Horeham	1677	Dyke	extant	

== E ==
Title	Date of creation	Surname	Current status	Notes
Earle of Stragglethorpe	1629	Earle	extinct 1697	
Eden of West Auckland	1672	Eden	extant	also Baronet Eden of Maryland in Great Britain from 1844 onwards.
Edwardes of Shrewsbury	1645	Edwardes	extinct 1900	new creation in 1678.
Edwards of York	1691	Edwards	extinct 1764	
Eldred of Saxham Magna	1642	Eldred	extinct 1653	
Ellys of Wyham	1660	Ellys	extinct 1742	
Elwes of Stoke	1660	Elwes	extinct 1787	
Englefield of Wotton Basset	1611	Englefield	extinct 1822	
Enyon of Flowrie	1642	Enyon	extinct 1642	
Ernle of Etchilhampton	1660	Ernle	extinct 1734	
Essex of Bewcot	1611	Essex	extinct 1645	
Estcourt of Newton	1627	Estcourt	extinct 1684	
Evelyn of Godstone	1660	Evelyn	extinct 1671	
Evelyn of Long Ditton	1683	Evelyn	extinct 1692	
Everard of Much Waltham	1629	Everard	extinct 1745	
Every of Eggington	1641	Every	extant	

== F ==
Title	Date of creation	Surname	Current status	Notes
Fagge of Wiston	1660	Fagg, Fagge	extant	
Fanshawe of Donamore	1650	Fanshawe	extinct 1694	
Farington of Chichester	1697	Farington	extinct 1719	
Felton of Playford	1620	Felton	extinct 1719	
Fenwick of Fenwick	1628	Fenwick	extinct 1697	
Fermor of Easton Neston	1641	Fermor	extinct 1867	
Ferrers of Skellingthorpe	1628	Ferrers	extinct 1675	
Fetherston of Blakesware	1660	Fetherston	extinct 1746	
Fettiplace of Childrey	1661	Fettiplace	extinct 1743	
Filmer of East Sutton	1674	Filmer	extinct 1916	
Finch of Eastwell	1611	Finch	extant	merged with the earldom of Winchilsea in 1634.
Finch of Raunston	1660	Finch	extant	created Earl of Nottingham (1681) in the Peerage of England.
Firebrace of London	1698	Firebrace	extinct 1759	
Fisher of Packington	1622	Fisher	extinct 1739	
Fisher of St Giles	1627	Fisher	extinct 1707	
Fitton of Gawsworth	1617	Fitton	extinct 1643	
Fleetwood of Caldwick	1611	Fleetwood	extinct 1780	
Fleming of Rydal Hall	1705	Fleming, le Fleming	extant	
Fletcher of Hutton le Forest	1641	Fletcher	extinct 1712	
Foljambe of Walton	1622	Foljambe	extinct 1640	
Foote of London	1660	Foote	extinct 1688	
Forster of Aldermaston	1620	Forster	extinct 1711	
Forster of Bamborough	1620	Forster	extinct 1623	
Forster of East Greenwich	1661	Forster	extinct 1705	
Forster of Stokesby	1649	Forster	extinct 1710	
Fortescue of Fallapit	1664	Fortescue	dormant 1729	
Fortescue of Woodleigh	1667	Fortescue	extinct 1685	
Foulis of Ingelby	1620	Foulis	extinct 1876	
Fowell of Fowellscombe	1661	Fowell	extinct 1692	
Fowler of Harnage Grange	1704	Fowler	extinct 1771	
Fowler of Islington	1628	Fowler	extinct 1656	
Frankland of Thirkelby	1660	Frankland	extant	merged with Baron Zouche in 1965.
Franklin of Moor Park	1660	Franklin	extinct 1728	
Frere of Water Eaton	1620	Frere	extinct 1629	
Fuller of Inner Temple	1687	Fuller	extinct 1709	
Fust of Hill	1662	Fust	extinct 1779	
Fytche of Eltham	1688	Fytche	extinct 1736	

== G ==
Title	Date of creation	Surname	Current status	Notes
Gage of Firle Place	1622	Gage	extant	merged with the Viscountcy of Gage in 1744.
Gage, later Rokewode-Gage of Hengrave	1662	Gage	extinct 1872	
Gamull of Chester	1644	Gamull	extinct 1654	
Gans of the Netherlands	1682	Gans	extinct 1700	
Gardiner of Roche Court	1660	Gardiner	extinct 1779	
Garrard of Lamer	1622	Garrard	extinct 1767	
Garrard of Longford	1662	Garrard	extinct 1728	
Gawdy of Crows Hall	1661	Gawdy	extinct 1720	
Gawdy of West Harling	1663	Gawdy	extinct 1724	
Gell of Hopton	1642	Gell	extinct 1719	
Gerard of Bryn	1611	Gerard	extant	created Baron Gerard (1876) in the Peerage of the United Kingdom.
Gerard of Fiskerton	1666	Gerard, Cosin-Gerard	extinct 1730	
Gerard of Harrow-on-the-Hill	1620	Gerard	extinct 1716	
Germain of Westminster	1698	Germain	extinct 1718	
Gifford of Burstall	1660	Gifford	extinct 1739	
Gleane of Hardwick	1666	Gleane	extinct 1745	
Glynne of Bisseter	1661	Glynne	extinct 1874	
Godolphin of Godolphin	1661	Godolphin	extinct 1710	
Golding of Colston Bassett	1642	Golding	extinct 1715	
Goodricke of Ribstan	1641	Goodricke	extinct 1839	
Gorges of Langford	1611	Gorges	extinct 1712	created Baron Gorges of Dundalk (1620) in the Peerage of Ireland.
Goring of Burton	1622	Goring	extinct 1724	
Goring of Leighthorne	1678	Bowyer, Goring	extant	
Gostwick of Willington	1611	Gostwick	dormant 1766	
Gould of London	1660	Gould	extinct 1664	
Gower of Sittersham	1620	Gower, Leveson-Gower	extant	created Baron Gower (1703) in the Peerage of England; Earl Gower (1746) and Marquess of Stafford (1786) in the Peerage of Great Britain; Duke of Sutherland (1833) in the Peerage of the United Kingdom.
Graham of Esk	1629	Graham	dormant	third Baronet created Viscount Preston in 1648, which title became extinct in 1739; baronetcy dormant as of 30 June 2006 (12th Baronet died 1975)
Graham of Norton Conyers	1662	Graham	extant	
Greaves of St Leonard's Forest	1645	Greaves	extinct 1680	
Green of Stampford	1660	Green	extinct 1676	
Greene of Mitcham	1664	Greene	extinct 1671	
Grenville of Kilkhampton	1630	Grenville	extinct 1659	
Gresham of Lympsfield	1660	Gresham	extinct 1801	
Gresley of Drakelowe	1611	Gresley	extinct 1976	
Grey Egerton of Egerton and Oulton	1617	Egerton, Grey-Egerton	extant	seventh Baronet created Earl of Wilton in 1801, which title separated from the baronetcy in 1814
Grey of Chillingham	1619	Grey	extinct 1706	created Baron Grey (1624) in England.
Griffith of Burton Agnes	1627	Griffith	extinct 1656	
Grimston of Bradfield	1611	Grimston	extinct 1700	
Grimston of Little Waltham	1629	Grimston	extant	created Earl of Verulam in the Peerage of the United Kingdom.
Grosvenor of Eaton	1622	Grosvenor	extant	created Baron Grosvenor (1761) in the Peerage of Great Britain; merged with the dukedom of Westminster.
Guise of Elmore	1661	Guise	extinct 1783	
Guldeford of Hempsted Place	1686	Guldeford	extinct 1740	
Gurney of London	1641	Gurney	extinct 1647	

== H ==
Title	Date of creation	Surname	Current status	Notes
Haggerston, later Constable Maxwell-Scott of Haggerston Castle	1642	Haggerston, Constable Maxwell-Scott	extant	
Hales of Beakesbourne	1660	Hales	extinct 1824	
Hales of Coventry	1660	Hales	extinct 1806	
Hales of Woodchurch	1611	Hales	extinct 1829	
Halford of Welham	1706	Halford	extinct 1720	The baronetcy did not appear in Burke's Extinct Baronetcies 1841
Halford of Wistow	1641	Halford	extinct 1780	the last baronet Sir Charles Halford left his estate, after a lifetime interest to his widow, to his kinsman Henry Vaughan, later Sir Henry Halford
Halton of Samford Parva	1642	Halton	extinct 1823	
Hamilton of London	1642	Hamilton	extinct 1670	
Hampson of Taplow	1642	Hampson	extinct 1969	
Hanham of Deans Court	1667	Hanham	extant	
Hanmer of Hamner	1620	Hanmer	extinct 1746	
Harby of Aldenham	1660	Harby	extinct 1674	
Hardres of Hardres Court	1642	Hardres	extinct 1764	
Hare of Stow Bardolph	1641	Hare	extinct 1764	
Harington of Ridlington	1611	Harington	extant	forfeit (1661–1680).
Harpur-Crewe of Calke Abbey	1626	Harpur, Harpur-Crewe	extinct 1924	
Harries of Tong Castle	1623	Harries	extinct 1649	
Harris of Boreatton	1622	Harris	extinct 1693	
Harris of Stowford	1673	Harris	extinct 1686	
Hartopp of Freathby	1619	Hartopp	extinct 1762	
Hastings of Redlinch	1667	Hastings	extinct 1668	
Hatton of Long Stanton	1641	Hatton	extinct 1812	
Hawkesworth of Hawkesworth	1678	Hawkesworth	extinct 1735	
Hawley of Buckland	1644	Hawley	extinct 1790	created Baron Hawley (1646) in Ireland.
Hazlerigg of Noseley Hall	1622	Hasilrigg, Hesilrige, Hazlerigg	extant	thirteenth Baronet created Baron Hazlerigg in 1945; baronetcy unproven (14th Baronet died 2002) – under review
Head of Hermitage	1676	Head	extinct 1868	
Hele of Fleet	1627	Hele	extinct 1677	
Hendley of Cuckfield	1661	Hendley	extinct 1675	
Hene of Winkfield	1642	Hene, Henn	extinct 1710	
Henley of Henley	1660	Henley	extinct 1740	
Herbert of Bromfield	1660	Herbert	extinct 1668	
Herbert of Red Castle	1622	Herbert	extinct 1748	merged with Baron Powis in 1656, created Marquess of Powis (1687) in England.
Herbert of Tintern	1660	Herbert	extinct 1740	
Heron of Clipchase	1662	Heron, Myddleton	extinct 1801	
Hervey of Kidbrooke	1619	Hervey	extinct 1642	created Baron Hervey (1620) in England.
Hewet of Headley Hall	1621	Hewet	extinct 1822	
Hewett of Pishiobury	1660	Hewett	extinct 1689	created Viscount Hewett (1689) in the Peerage of England.
Heyman of Somerfield	1641	Heyman	extinct 1808	
Hickman of Gainsborough	1643	Hickman	extinct 1781	
Hicks-Beach of Beverston	1619	Hicks, Hicks-Beach	extant	created Earl St Aldwyn (1915) in the United Kingdom.
Hicks of Campden	1620	Hicks	extinct 1629	created Viscount Campden (1628) in the Peerage of England.
Hildyard of Pattrington	1660	Hildyard	extinct 1814	
Hobart of Intwood	1611	Hobart	extant	created Earl of Buckinghamshire (1746) in Great Britain.
Hoby of Bisham	1666	Hoby	extinct 1766	
Hodges of Middlesex	1697	Hodges	extinct 1722	
De Hoghton of Hoghton Tower	1611	De Hoghton	extant	
Holland of Quiddenham	1629	Holland	extinct 1729	
Holles of Winterbourne	1660	Holles	extinct 1694	merged with Baron Holles in 1680.
Holman of Banbury	1663	Holman	extinct 1700	
Holte of Aston	1611	Holte	extinct 1782	
Honywood of Evington	1660	Honywood	extant	
Hooke of Flanchford	1662	Hooke	extinct 1712	
Hoskyns of Harewood	1676	Hoskyns	extant	
Hotham of Scorborough	1622	Hotham, Hotham-Thompson	extant	created Baron Hotham (1797) in Ireland.
Howe of Cold Barwick	1660	Howe	extinct 1736	
Howe of Compton	1660	Howe	extinct 1814	merged with Viscount Howe in 1730.
Huband of Ipsley	1661	Huband	extinct 1730	
Hudson of Melton Mowbray	1660	Hudson	extinct 1781	
Humble of Kensington	1687	Humble	extinct 1709	
Humble of London	1660	Humble	extinct 1745	
Hungate of Saxton	1642	Hungate	extinct 1749	
Hunloke of Wingerworth	1643	Hunloke	extinct 1856	
Hussey of Caythorpe	1661	Hussey	extinct 1734	merged with Baronet Hussey of Honington in 1706.
Hussey of Honington	1611	Hussey	extinct 1734	merged with Baronet Hussey of Caythorpe in 1706.
Hyde of Albury	1621	Hyde	extinct 1665	

== I ==
Title	Date of creation	Surname	Current status	Notes
I'Anson	1652	I'Anson	extinct 1800	
Ingleby of Ripley	1642	Ingleby	extinct 1772	
Ingoldsby of Lethenborough	1661	Ingoldsby	extinct 1726	
Irby of Boston	1704	Irby	extant	created Baron Boston (1761) in Great Britain.
Isham of Lamport	1627	Isham	extant	

== J ==
Title	Date of creation	Surname	Current status	Notes
Jackson of Hickleton	1660	Jackson	extinct 1730	
Jacob of Bromley	1665	Jacob	extinct 1790	
Jacques of Middlesex	1628	Jacques	extinct 1661	
James of Creshall	1682	James	extinct 1741	
Jason of Broad Somerford	1661	James	extinct 1738	
Jeffreys of Bulstrode	1681	Jeffreys	extinct 1702	created Baron Jeffreys (1685).
Jenkinson of Walcot and Hawkesbury	1661	Jenkinson	extant	Earl of Liverpool from 1796 to 1851
Jenkinson of Walton	1685	Jenkinson	extinct 1739	
Jenoure of Much Dunmow	1628	Jenoure	extinct 1755	
Jermy	1663	Jermy		status unknown
Jerningham of Cossey	1621	Jerningham, Stafford-Jerningham	extinct 1935	associated with Baron Stafford (1809–1913).
Jocelyn of Hyde Hall	1665	Jocelyn	extant	merged with Earl of Roden in 1778.
Jones of Albemarlis	1643	Jones	extinct 1644	
Juxon of Albourne	1660	Juxon	extinct 1740	

== K ==
Title	Date of creation	Surname	Current status	Notes
Kaye of Woodesham	1642	Kaye	extinct 1809	
Keate of the Hoo	1660	Keate	extinct 1757	
Kemeys of Kevanmabley	1642	Kemeys	extinct 1735	
Kemp of Gissing	1642	Kemp	extinct 1936	
Kempe of Pentlow	1627	Kempe	extinct 1627	
Kenrick of Whitley	1679	Kenrick	extinct 1699	
Keyt of Ebrington	1660	Keyt	extinct 1784	
Killigrew of Arwennick	1660	Killigrew	extinct 1705	
Knatchbull of Mersham Hatch	1641	Knatchbull, Knatchbull-Wyndham	extant	merged with Baron Brabourne in 1917.
Knightley of Offchurch	1660	Knightley	extinct 1689	
Kniveton of Mercaston	1611	Kniveton	extinct 1706	
Knollys of Grove Place	1642	Knollys	extinct 1648	
Knyvett of Buckenham	1611	Knyvett	extinct 1699	
Kyrle of Much Marcle	1627	Kyrle	extinct 1680	

== L ==
Title	Date of creation	Surname	Current status	Notes
L'Estrange of Hunstanton	1629	L'Estrange	extinct 1762	
Langham of Cottesbrooke	1660	Langham	extant	
Langhorne of Inner Temple	1668	Langhorne	extinct 1715	
Langley of Higham Gobion	1641	Langley	extinct 1790	
Lawday of Exeter	1642	Lawday	extinct 1648	
Lawley of Spoonhill	1641	Lawley	extinct 1932	merged with Baron Wenlock in 1851.
Lawrence of Iver	1628	Lawrence	extinct 1714	
Lawson of Brough	1665	Lawson	extinct 1834	
Lawson of Isell	1688	Lawson	extinct 1806	
Lear of Lindridge	1683	Lear	extinct 1736	
Lear of London	1660	Lear	extinct 1683	
Lee of Hartwell	1660	Lee	extinct 1827	
Lee of Langley	1620	Lee	extinct 1660	
Lee of Quarendon	1611	Lee	extinct 1776	created Earl of Lichfield (1674) in England.
Legard of Ganton	1660	Legard	extant	
Leicester of Nether Tabley	1671	Byrne, Warren, Leicester	extinct 1968	associated with Baron de Tabley (1770–1895).
Leicester of Tabley	1660	Leicester	extinct 1742	
Leigh of Newnham	1618	Leigh	extinct 1653	created Earl of Chichester (1644) in England.
Leigh of Stoneleigh	1611	Leigh	extinct 1786	created Baron Leigh (1643) in England.
Leighton of Watlesborough	1693	Leighton	extant	
Leke of Newark-upon-Trent	1663	Leke	extinct 1681	
Leke of Sutton	1611	Leke	extinct 1736	created Earl of Scarsdale (1645) in England.
Leman of Northaw	1665	Leman	extinct 1762	
Lennard of West Wickham	1642	Lennard	extinct 1727	
Leventhorpe of Shingey Hall	1622	Leventhorpe	extinct 1680	
Lewis of Ledstone	1660	Lewis	extinct 1671	
Lewis of Llangorse	1628	Lewis	extinct 1677	
Ley of Westbury	1619	Ley	extinct 1679	created Earl of Marlborough (1626) in England.
Liddell of Ravensworth Castle	1642	Liddell	extant	created Baron Ravensworth (1821) in the United Kingdom.
Littleton of Pillaton Hall	1627	Littleton	extinct 1812	
Littleton of Stoke Milburgh	1642	Littleton	extinct 1709	
Livesey of East Church	1627	Livesey	attainted 1660	
Lloyd of Garth	1661	Lloyd	extinct 1743	
Lloyd of Woking	1662	Lloyd	extinct 1674	
Lloyd of Yale	1647	Lloyd	extinct 1700	
Long of Westminster	1662	Long, Tylney-Long	extinct 1805	
Long of Whaddon	1661	Long	extinct 1710	
Loraine of Kirke Harle	1664	Loraine	extinct 1961	
Lort of Stackpoole Court	1662	Lort	extinct 1698	
Lowther of Marske	1697	Lowther	extinct 1753	
Lowther of Whitehaven	1642	Lowther	extinct 1755	
Lucas of Fenton	1644	Lucas	extinct 1667	
Luckyn of Little Waltham	1629	Luckyn, Grimston	extant	created Earl of Verulam (1815) in the United Kingdom.
Luckyn of Waltham	1661	Luckyn	extinct 1700	
Lucy of Broxbourn	1618	Lucy	extinct 1759	
Lumley of Bradfield Magna	1641	Lumley	extinct 1771	
Lyttelton of Frankley	1618	Lyttelton	extant	merged with Viscount Cobham.

== M ==
Title	Date of creation	Surname	Current status	Notes
Mackworth of Normanton	1619	Mackworth	extinct 1803	
Maddox of Wormley	1676	Maddox	extinct 1716	
Mainwaring of Over Peover	1660	Mainwaring	extinct 1797	
Mannock of Giffords Hall	1627	Mannock	extinct 1787	
Mansel of Margam	1611	Mansel	extinct 1750	Created Baron Mansel (1712) in Great Britain.
Mansel of Muddlescombe	1622	Mansel	extant	
Mansel of Trimsaran	1697	Mansel	extinct 1798	
Maples of Stow	1627	Maples	extinct 1655	
Markham of Sedgebroke	1642	Markham	extinct 1779	
Marow of Berkswell	1679	Marow	extinct 1690	
Marsham of Cuckston	1663	Marsham	extant	created Baron Romney (1716) in the Peerage of Great Britain and Earl of Romney (1801) in the Peerage of the United Kingdom.
Martin of Long Melford	1667	Martin	extinct 1854	
Marwood of Little Bushby	1660	Marwood	extinct 1740	
Masham of High Lever	1621	Masham	extinct 1776	merged with Baron Masham in 1723.
Massingberd of Braytoft Hall	1660	Massingberd	extinct 1723	
Matthews of Gobions	1662	Matthews	extinct 1708	
Mauleverer of Allerton	1641	Mauleverer	extinct 1713	
Maynard of Eaton Parva	1611	Maynard	extinct 1775	created Baron Maynard (1620) in the Peerage of Ireland.
Maynard of Walthamstow	1682	Maynard	extinct 1865	merged with Viscount Maynard in 1775.
Mayney of Linton	1641	Mayney	extinct 1706	
Merces of France	1660	de Merces		status unknown
Meredith of Stainsley	1622	Meredith	extinct 1738	
Meux of Kingston	1641	Meux	extinct 1706	
Middleton of Belsay Castle	1662	Middleton	extinct 1999	
Middleton of Hackney	1681	Middleton	extinct 1702	
Middleton of Leighton Hall	1642	Middleton	extinct 1673	
Middleton of Ruthyn	1622	Middleton	extinct 1757	
Milbanke of Halnaby	1661	Milbanke, Noel, Huskisson	extinct 1949	
Mildmay of Moulsham	1611	Mildmay	extinct 1626	
Mill of Camois Court	1619	Mill	extinct 1835	
Miller of Chichester	1705	Miller	extant	
Miller of Oxenhoath	1660	Miller	extinct 1714	
Modyford of Lincoln's Inn	1664	Modyford	extinct 1702	
Modyford of London	1661	Modyford	extinct 1678	
Mohun of Boconnoc	1611	Mohun	extinct 1712	Merged with the barony of Mohun of Okehampton in 1639.
Molesworth-St Aubyn of Pencarrow	1689	Molesworth, Molesworth-St Aubyn	extant	
Molyneux of Sefton	1611	Molyneux	extinct 1972	created Viscount Molyneux (1628) in the Peerage of England and Earl of Sefton (1771) in the Peerage of Great Britain.
Molyneux of Teversall	1611	Molyneux	extinct 1812	
Monins of Waldershare	1611	Monins	extinct 1678	
Monoux of Wotton	1660	Monoux	extinct 1814	
Monson of Carleton	1611	Monson	extant	created Baron Monson (1728) in the Peerage of Great Britain.
Moody of Garesdon	1622	Moody	extinct 1661	
Moore of Fawley	1627	Moore	extinct 1807	
Moore of Mayds Morton	1665	Moore	extinct 1678	
Mordaunt of Massingham Parva	1611	Mordaunt	extant	
Morden of Wricklemarsh	1688	Morden	extinct 1708	
More of Loseley	1642	More	extinct 1684	
More of More Hall	1675	More	extinct 1810	
Morgan of Langattock	1661	Morgan	extinct 1767	
Morgan of Llanternam	1642	Morgan	extinct 1728	
Morland of Sulhamstead	1660	Morland	extinct 1716	
Morrice of Werrington	1661	Morrice	extinct 1750	
Morrison of Cashiobury	1611	Morrison	extinct 1628	
Morton of Milbourne St Andrew	1619	Morton	extinct 1699	
Mosley of Rolleston	1640	Mosley	extinct 1665	
Mostyn of Mostyn	1660	Mostyn	extinct 1831	
Mostyn of Talacre	1670	Mostyn	extant	
Mottet of Liege	1660	Mottet		status unknown
Moyer of Petsey Hall	1701	Moyer	extinct 1716	
Musgrave of Edenhall	1611	Musgrave	extant	
Myddelton of Chirke	1660	Myddelton	extinct 1718	

== N ==
Title	Date of creation	Surname	Current status	Notes
Napier of Luton Hoo	1611	Napier	extinct 1748	
Napier of Middle Marsh	1641	Napier	extinct 1765	
Napier of Punknoll	1682	Napier	extinct 1743	status uncertain
Narborough of Knowlton	1688	Narborough	extinct 1707	
Neale of Wollaston	1646	Neale	extinct 1691	
Nelthorpe of Grays Inn	1666	Nelthorpe	extinct 1865	
Nevill of Grove	1675	Nevill	extinct 1685	
Nevill of Holt	1661	Nevill	extinct 1712	
Newdigate of Arbury	1677	Newdigate	extinct 1806	
Newman of Fifehead-Magdalen	1699	Newman	extinct 1747	
Newton of Barrs Court	1660	Newton	extinct 1743	
Newton of London	1661	Newton	extinct 1670	
Nicolls of Hardwick	1641	Nicolls	extinct 1717	
Nightingale of Newport Pond	1628	Nightingale	extant	
Noel of Brook	1611	Noel	extinct 1629	merged with Viscount Campden in 1629.
Noel of Kirkby Mallery	1660	Noel	extinct 1815	merged with Baron Wentworth in 1745, created Viscount Wentworth (1762) in Great Britain.
Norris of Speke	1698	Norris	extinct 1702	
North of Mildenhall	1660	North	extinct 1695	
Northcote of Hayne	1641	Northcote	extant	created Earl of Iddesleigh (1885) in the United Kingdom.
Norton of Coventry	1661	Norton	extinct 1691	
Norton of Rotherfield	1622	Norton	extinct 1687	
Norwich of Brampton	1641	Norwich	extinct 1742	

== O ==
Title	Date of creation	Surname	Current status	Notes
Oglander of Nunwell	1665	Oglander	extinct 1874	
Oldfield of Spalding	1660	Oldfield	extinct 1705	
Onslow of West Clandon	1674	Onslow	extant	created Baron Onslow (1716) in the Peerage of Great Britain; Earl Onslow (1801) in the Peerage of the United Kingdom.
Orby of Croyland	1658	Orby	extinct 1725	
Osbaldeston of Chadlington	1664	Osbaldeston	extinct 1749	
Osborn of Chicksands	1662	Osborn	extant	
Osborne of Kiveton	1620	Osborne	extinct 1964	created Duke of Leeds (1694) in the Peerage of England.
Owen of Orielton	1641	Owen, Owen-Barlow	extinct 1851	
Oxenden of Dene	1678	Oxenden, Dixwell-Oxenden	extinct 1924	

== P ==
Title	Date of creation	Surname	Current status	Notes
Pakington of Ailesbury	1620	Pakington	extinct 1830	
Palgrave of Norwood Barningham	1641	Palgrave	extinct 1732	
Palmer of Carlton	1660	Palmer	extant	
Palmer of Wingham	1621	Palmer	extinct 1838	
Parker of Arwaton	1661	Parker	extinct 1741	
Parker of Melford Hall	1681	Parker	extant	
Parker of Ratton	1674	Parker	extinct 1750	
Parkyns of Bunney	1681	Parkyns	extinct or dormant 1926	baronetcy dormant (7th Baronet died 1926)
Parsons of Langley	1661	Parsons	extinct 1812	
Paston of Oxnead	1641	Paston	extinct 1732	created Viscount Yarmouth (1673) in England.
Pate of Sysonby	1643	Pate	extinct 1659	
Paylor of Thoralby	1642	Paylor	extinct 1705	
Pelham of Laughton	1611	Pelham	extant	created Earl of Chichester (1801) in the United Kingdom.
Pennington of Muncaster	1676	Pennington	extinct 1917	merged with Baron Muncaster in 1676.
Pennyman of Marske	1628	Pennyman	extinct 1643	
Pennyman of Ormsby	1664	Pennyman, Pennyman-Warton	extinct 1852	
Penyston of Leigh	1611	Penyston	extinct 1705	
Smithson, later Percy of Stanwick	1660	Smithson, Percy	extant	Duke of Northumberland in the Peerage of Great Britain
Peshall of Horsley	1611	Peshall	extinct 1712	
Petre of Cranham Hall	1642	Petre	extinct 1722	
Pettus of Rackheath	1641	Pettus	extinct 1772	
Peyton of Doddington	1660	Peyton	extinct 1661	
Peyton of Doddington	1667	Peyton	extinct 1771	
Peyton of Isleham	1611	Peyton	extinct 1815	
Peyton of Knowlton	1611	Peyton	extinct 1684	
Phelipps of Barrington	1620	Phelipps	extinct 1690	
Philipps of Picton Castle	1621	Philipps	extant	created Viscount St Davids (1918) in the Peerage of the United Kingdom.
Pickering of Whaddon	1661	Pickering	extinct 1705	
Pile of Compton	1628	Pile	extinct 1761	
Pindar of Idinshaw	1662	Pindar	extinct 1705	
Playters of Sotterley	1623	Playters	extinct 1832	
Plomer of Inner Temple	1661	Plomer	extinct 1697	
Pole of Shute	1628	Pole	extant	
Pollard of Kings Nympton	1627	Pollard	extinct 1701	
Poole of Poole	1677	Poole	extinct 1821	
Pope of Wilcote	1611	Pope	extinct 1668	Created Earl of Downe (1628) in Ireland.
Portman of Orchard	1611	Portman	extinct 1690	
Potts of Mannington	1641	Potts	extinct 1732	
Powell of Birkenhead	1629	Powell	extinct 1700	
Powell of Broadway	1698	Powell	extinct 1721	
Powell of Ewhurst	1661	Powell	extinct 1742	
Powell of Pengethly	1622	Powell	extinct 1653	
Powell of Pengethly	1661	Powell	extinct 1680	
Pratt of Coleshill	1641	Pratt	extinct 1674	
Preston of Furness	1644	Preston	extinct 1709	
Prestwich of Hulme	1644	Prestwich	extinct 1676	
Prideaux of Netherton	1622	Prideaux	extinct 1875	
Proby of Elton	1662	Proby	extinct 1689	
Pryce of Newton	1628	Pryce	extinct 1791	
Pryse of Gogarthen	1641	Pryse	extinct 1694	
Puckering of Charlton	1620	Newton, Puckering	extinct 1700	
Puckering of Weston	1611	Puckering	extinct 1636	
Purefoy of Wadley	1662	Purefoy	extinct 1686	
Putt of Combe	1666	Putt	extinct 1721	
Pye of Hone	1665	Pye	extinct 1734	
Pye of Lekhampstead	1641	Pye	extinct 1673	
Pym of Brymore	1663	Pym	extinct 1688	
Pynsent of Erthfont	1687	Pynsent	extinct 1765	

== R ==
Title	Date of creation	Surname	Current status	Notes
Radclyffe of Derwentwater	1620	Radclyffe	attainted 1716	created Earl of Derwentwater (1688) in England.
Ramsden of Byrom	1689	Ramsden, Pennington-Ramsden	extant	
Rawdon of Moira	1665	Rawdon	extinct 1868	created Earl of Moira (1762) in Great Britain.
Rayney of Wrotham	1642	Rayney	extinct 1721	
Reade of Brocket Hall	1642	Reade	extinct 1712	
Reade of Shipton Court	1661	Reade	extant	
Reeve of Thwaite	1663	Reeve	extinct 1688	
Reresby of Thribergh	1642	Reresby	extinct 1748	
Rich of London	1676	Rich	extinct 1799	
Rich of Sunning	1661	Rich	extinct 1803	
Richards of Brambletye	1684	Richards	dormant 1741	
Ridgeway of Torrington	1611	Ridgeway	extinct 1714	created Earl of Londonderry (1622) in Ireland.
Rivers of Chafford	1621	Rivers	extinct 1870	
Robartes of Truro	1621	Robartes	extinct 1757	created Baron Robartes (1625) in England.
Roberts of Bow	1681	Roberts	extinct 1692	
Roberts of Glassenbury	1620	Roberts	extinct 1745	
Roberts of Willesdon	1661	Roberts	extinct 1698	
Robinson of London	1660	Robinson	extant	
Robinson of Long Melford	1682	Robinson	extinct 1743	
Robinson of Newby	1660	Robinson	extinct 1689	
Robinson of Newby	1690	Robinson	extinct 1923	merged with Baron Grantham in 1792; created Viscount Goderich (1827), Earl of Ripon (1833), and Marquess of Ripon (1871) in the United Kingdom.
Rodes of Barlborough	1641	Rodes	extinct 1743	
Rogers of Wisdome	1699	Rogers	extinct 1895	associated with Baron Blachford (1851–1889).
Rokeby of Skiers	1661	Rokeby	extinct 1678	
Rothwell of Ewerby	1661	Rothwell	extinct 1694	
Rous of Henham	1660	Rous	extant	created Earl of Stradbroke (1821) in the United Kingdom.
Rouse of Rouse Lench	1641	Rouse	extinct 1721	
Rudd of Aberglassney	1628	Rudd	extinct 1739	
Rudston of Hayton	1642	Rudston	extinct 1700	
Rushout of Milnst	1661	Rushout	extinct 1887	created Baron Northwick (1797) in Great Britain.
Russell of Chippenham	1629	Russell	extinct 1804	
Russell of Langherne	1660	Russell	extinct 1714	
Russell of Wytley	1627	Russell	extinct 1705	

== S ==
Title	Date of creation	Surname	Current status	Notes
Sabine of Ion House	1671	Sabine	extinct 1704	
Sadlier of Temple Dinsley	1661	Sadlier	extinct 1719	
Salusbury of Llewenny	1619	Salusbury	extinct 1684	
Sambrooke of London	1701	Sambrooke	extinct 1754	
Samwell of Upton	1675	Samwell	extinct 1789	
Sandford of Howgill	1661	Sandford	extinct 1723	
Sandys of Northborne	1684	Sandys	extinct 1726	
Sandys of Wilberton	1611	Sandys	extinct 1654	
Sas van Bosch of Holland	1680	Sas van Bosch	extinct 1720	
Saunderson of Saxby	1611	Saunderson	extinct 1723	created Viscount Castleton (1627) in the Peerage of England.
Savage of Rocksavage	1611	Savage	extinct 1735	created Viscount Savage (1626) in the Peerage of England.
Savile of Copley	1662	Savile	extinct 1689	
Savile of Methley	1611	Savile	extinct 1632	
Savile of Thornhill	1611	Savile	extinct 1784	
Sclater of Cambridge	1660	Sclater	extinct 1684	
Scott of Kew Green	1653	Scott	extinct 1775	
Scrope of Cockerington	1667	Scrope	extinct 1680	
Scudamore of Ballingham	1644	Scudamore	extinct 1720	
Sebright of Besford	1626	Sebright	dormant	(14th Baronet died 1985)
Sedley of Ailesford	1611	Sedley	extinct 1701	
Selby of Whitehouse	1664	Selby	extinct 1668	
Seylyiard of Delaware	1661	Sylyiard, Seylyiard	extinct 1701	
Seymour of Berry Pomeroy	1611	Seymour	extant	merged with the dukedom of Somerset in 1750
Seymour of Langley	1681	Seymour	extinct 1714	
Best-Shaw of Eltham	1665	Shaw, Best-Shaw	extant	
Shelley of Michelgrove	1611	Shelley	extant	
Sherard of Lopthorp	1673	Sherard	extinct 1748	
Sherburne of Stonyhurst	1686	Sherburne	extinct 1717	
Shiers of Slyfield	1684	Shiers	extinct 1685	
Shirley of Preston	1666	Shirley	extinct 1705	
Shirley of Staunton	1611	Shirley	extant	created Earl Ferrers (1711) in the Peerage of Great Britain.
Shuckburgh of Shuckburgh	1660	Shuckburgh	extant	
Simeon of Chilworth	1677	Simeon	extinct 1768	
Skeffington of Fisherwick	1627	Skeffington	extinct 1816	merged with the Viscountcy of Massereene in 1665.
Skipwith of Metheringham	1678	Skipwith	extinct 1756	
Skipwith of Newbold Hall	1670	Skipwith	extinct 1790	
Skipwith of Prestwould	1622	Skipwith	extant	
Slanning of Maristow	1663	Slanning	extinct 1700	
Slingsby of Bifrons	1657	Slingsby	extinct after 1677	
Slingsby of Newcells	1661	Slingsby	extinct 1661	
Slingsby of Scriven	1628	Slingsby	extinct 1630	
Smith of Crantock	1642	Smith	extinct 1661	
Smith of Edmonthorpe	1661	Smith	extinct 1721	
Smith of Hatherton	1660	Smith	extinct 1706	
Smith of Isleworth	1694	Smith	extinct 1760	
Smith of Long Ashton	1661	Smith	extinct 1741	
Smithson of Stanwick	1660	Smithson, Percy	extant	merged with Earl of Northumberland in 1750, created Duke of Northumberland (1766) in Great Britain.
Smyth of Redcliff	1661	Smyth	extinct 1732	
Smyth of Upton	1665	Smyth	extinct 1852	
Smythe of Eske Hall	1661	Smith, Smythe	extinct 1942	
Snow of Salesbury	1679	Snow	extinct 1702	
Soame of Thurlow	1685	Soame	extinct 1798	
Southcote of Blighborough	1662	Southcote	extinct 1680	
Speelman of the Netherlands	1686	Speelman	extant	
Speke of Hamilbury	1660	Speke	extinct 1683	
Spencer of Offley	1627	Spencer	extinct 1633	
Spencer of Offley	1642	Spencer	extinct 1712	
Spencer of Yarnton	1611	Spencer	extinct 1771	
Sprignell of Coppenthorp	1641	Sprignell	extinct 1691	
Spring of Pakenham	1641	Spring	dormant 1769	6th Baronet died 1769
Springet of Broyle Place	1661	Springet	extinct 1662	
St Aubyen of Clowance	1671	St Aubyn	extinct 1839	
St Barbe of Broadlands	1662	St Barbe	extinct 1723	
St John of Lydiard Tregoze	1611	St John	dormant	fourth Baronet created Viscount St John in 1716; (10th Baronet died 1974)
St John of Woodford	1660	St John	extant	merged with the barony of St John in 1711.
St Paul of Snarford	1611	St Paul	extinct 1613	
St Quintin of Harpham	1642	St Quintin	extinct 1795	
Standish of Duxbury	1677	Standish	extinct 1812	
Stanley of Alderley	1660	Stanley	extant	merged with Baron Stanley of Alderley in 1839, also Baron Sheffield in Ireland.
Stanley of Bickerstaff	1627	Stanley	extant	merged with the Earl of Derby in 1736.
Stanley of Grange Gorman	1699	Stanley	extinct 1744	
Stanley of Hooton	1661	Stanley, Errington	extinct 1893	
Stapleton of Leeward Islands	1679	Stapleton	extinct 1995	
Stapley of Patcham	1660	Stapley	extinct 1701	
Stapylton of Carlton	1662	Stapylton	extinct 1707	
Stapylton of Myton	1660	Stapylton	extinct 1817	
Stepney of Prendergast	1621	Stepney	extinct 1825	
Stewkley of Hinton	1627	Stewkley	extinct 1719	
Stonhouse of Amberden Hall	1641	Stonhouse	extinct 1695	
Stonhouse of Radley	1628	Stonhouse	extant	Also Baronet Stonhouse of Radley (1670).
Stonhouse of Radley	1670	Stonhouse	extant	merged with Stonehouse of Radley (1628) in 1740.
Stoughton of Stoughton	1661	Stoughton	extinct 1692	
Stradling of St Donats	1611	Stradling	extinct 1738	
Strickland of Boynton	1641	Strickland, Strickland-Constable	extant	
Strutt of Little Warley Hall	1642	Strutt	extinct 1661	
Stuart of Hartley Mauduit	1660	Stuart	dormant	(7th Baronet died 1939)
Stych of Newbury	1687	Stych	extinct 1725	
Stydolph of Norbury	1660	Stydolph	extinct 1677	
Style of Beckenham	1627	Style	extinct 1659	
Style of Wateringbury	1627	Style	extant	
Sudbury of Eldon	1685	Sudbury	extinct 1691	
Swale of Swale Hall	1660	Swale	extinct 1741	
Swan of Southfleet	1666	Swan	extinct 1712	
Swinburne of Capheaton	1660	Swinburne	extinct 1967	
Sydenham of Brimpton	1641	Sydenham	extinct 1793	

== T ==
Title	Date of creation	Surname	Current status	Notes
Tancred of Borough Bridge	1662	Tancred, Lawson-Tancred	extant	
Taylor of Park House	1665	Taylor	extinct 1720	
Tempest of Stella	1622	Tempest	extinct 1742	
Tempest of Tong	1664	Tempest	extinct 1819	
Temple of Sheen	1666	Temple	extinct 1699	
Temple of Stowe	1611	Temple	dormant 1786	associated with Viscount Cobham (1675–1749)
Thomas of Folkington	1660	Thomas	extinct 1706	
Thomas of Michaelstown	1642	Thomas	extinct 1684	
Thomas of Wenvoe	1694	Thomas	extant	
Thompson of Haversham	1673	Thompson	extinct 1745	created Baron Haversham (1696) in the Peerage of England.
Thornhill of Barbados	1682	Thornhill	extinct 1693	
Thornhurst of Agnes Court	1622	Thornhurst	extinct 1627	
Thornycroft of Milcomb	1701	Thornycroft	extinct 1734	
Thorold of Hawley	1644	Thorold	extinct 1706	
Thorold of Marston	1642	Thorold	extant	baronetcy unproven; (15th Baronet died 1999)
Throckmorton of Coughton	1642	Throckmorton	extinct 1994	
Throckmorton of Tortworth	1611	Throckmorton	extinct 1682	
Thynne of Cause Castle	1641	Thynne	extant	created Viscount Weymouth (1682) in the Peerage of England and Marquess of Bath (1789) in the Peerage of Great Britain.
Tichborne of Beaulieu	1697	Tichborne	extinct 1731	created Baron Ferrard (1715) in the Peerage of Ireland.
Tichborne of Tichborne	1621	Tichborne, Doughty-Tichborne	extinct 1968	
Tipping of Wheatfield	1698	Tipping	extinct 1725	
Tollemache of Helmingham	1611	Tollemache	extinct 1821	merged with the Earldom of Dysart in 1698.
Tooker of Maddington	1664	Tooker	extinct 1676	
Topp of Tormarton	1668	Topp	extinct 1733	
Townshend of Rainham	1617	Townshend	extant	created Baron Townshend (1661) and Viscount Townshend (1681) in the Peerage of England; created Marquess Townshend (1787) in the Peerage of Great Britain.
Tracy of Stanway	1611	Tracy	extinct 1678	
Trelawny of Trelawny	1628	Trelawny, Salusbury-Trelawny	extant	
Tresham of Rushton	1611	Tresham	extinct 1642	
Trevelyan of Nettlecomb	1662	Trevelyan	dormant	(9th Baronet died 1976)
Trevor of Enfield	1641	Trevor	extinct 1676	
Trollope of Casewick	1642	Trollope	extant	
Trott of Leverstoke	1660	Trott	extinct 1672	
Tryon of Layer Marney	1620	Tryon	extinct 1724	
Tufton of Hothfield	1611	Tufton	extinct 1849	created Earl of Thanet (1628) in the Peerage of England.
Tufton of the Mote	1641	Tufton	extinct 1685	
Tuke of Cressing Temple	1664	Tuke	extinct 1690	
Tulp of Amsterdam	1675	Tulp	extinct or dormant 1690	
Twisden of Bradbourn	1666	Twisden	extinct 1937	
Twistleton of Barley	1629	Twistleton	extinct 1635	
Twysden of Roydon Hall	1611	Twysden	extinct 1970	
Tynte of Halsewell	1674	Tynte	extinct 1785	
Tyrrell of Hanslape	1665	Tyrrell	extinct 1714	
Tyrrell of Lynn	1686	Tyrrell	extinct 1691	
Tyrrell of Springfield	1666	Tyrrell	extinct 1766	
Tyrrell of Thornton	1628	Tyrrell	extinct 1749	
Tyrwhitt of Stainfield	1611	Tyrwhitt	extinct 1760	

== V ==
Title	Date of creation	Surname	Current status	Notes
Valckenburg of Middleing	1642	Valckenburg	extinct 1679	
Van Colster of Amsterdam	1645	Van Colster	extinct 1665	
Van Freisendorf of Hirdech	1661	Van Freisendorf	status unknown	
Van Lore of Tylehurst	1628	Van Lore	extinct 1645	
Van Tromp of Holland	1675	Van Tromp	extinct 1691	
Vanderbrande of Cleverskirke	1699	Vanderbrande	extinct after 1713	
Vavasour of Copmanthorpe	1643	Vavasour	extinct 1659	
Vavasour of Haselwood	1628	Vavasour	extinct 1826	
Vavasour of Killingthorpe	1631	Vavasour	extinct 1644	
Verney of Middle Claydon	1661	Verney	extinct 1791	created Viscount Fermanagh (1703) and Earl Verney (1742) in the Peerage of Ireland.
Vernon of Hodnet	1660	Vernon	extinct 1725	
Villiers of Brooksby	1619	Villiers	extinct 1712	
Vincent of Stoke d'Abernon	1620	Vincent	extinct 1941	merged with Viscount D'Abernon in 1936.
Viner of London	1666	Viner	extinct 1688	
Vitus of Limerick	1677	Vitus	forfeit 1691	
von Friesendorff of Hirdech, Sweden	1622	Skipwith	extant	
Vyner of London	1661	Vyner	extinct 1683	
Vyvyan of Trelowarren	1645	Vyvyan	dormant	(12th Baronet died 1995)

== W ==
Title	Date of creation	Surname	Current status	Notes
Wake of Clevedon	1621	Wake, Wake-Jones	extant	
Wakeman of Beckford	1661	Wakeman	extinct 1690	patent never sealed
Waldegrave of Hever Castle	1643	Waldegrave	extant	created Baron Waldegrave (1686) in the Peerage of England and Earl Waldegrave (1729) in the Peerage of Great Britain.
Walker of Bushey Hall	1680	Walker	extinct 1703	
Walter of Saresden	1641	Walter	extinct 1731	
Wandesford of Kirklington	1662	Wandesford	extinct 1784	created Viscount Castlecomer (1706) in the Peerage of Ireland.
Warburton of Arley	1660	Warburton	extinct 1813	
Ward of Bexley	1660	Ward	extinct 1770	
Warner of Parham	1660	Warner	extinct 1705	
Warre of Hestercombe	1673	Warre	extinct 1718	
Wasteneys of Headon	1622	Wasteneys	extinct 1742	
Watson of Rockingham Castle	1621	Watson	extinct 1782	created Baron Rockingham (1645) in the Peerage of England and the Marquess of Rockingham (1746) in the Peerage of Great Britain.
Webb of Oldstock	1644	Webb	extinct 1874	
Webster of Copthall	1703	Webster	extinct 1923	
Wenman of Caswell	1662	Wenman	extinct 1800	succeeded Viscount Wenman in 1686.
Wentworth of Gosfield	1611	Wentworth	extinct 1631	
Wentworth of North Elmsal	1692	Wentworth	extinct 1741	
Wentworth of Wentworth Woodhouse	1611	Wentworth	extinct 1799	created Earl of Strafford (1711) in the Peerage of Great Britain.
Wentworth of West Bretton	1664	Wentworth	extinct 1792	
Werden of Cholmeaton	1672	Werden	extinct 1758	
Westcombe of Cadiz	1700	Westcombe	extinct 1752	
Wharton of Kirby Kendall	1677	Wharton	extinct by 1741	
Wheate of Glympton	1667	Wheate	extinct 1816	
Wheate of Glympton	1696	Wheate	extinct 1816	
Wheler of Westminster	1660	Wheler	extant	
Whichcote of Inner Temple	1660	Whichcote	extinct 1949	
Whitmore of Apley	1641	Whitmore	extinct 1699	
Widdrington of Cartington	1642	Widdrington	extinct 1671	
Widdrington of Widdrington	1642	Widdrington	attainted 1716	created Baron Widdrington (1643) in England.
Wilbraham of Woodhey	1621	Wilbraham	extinct 1692	
Wilde of London	1660	Wilde	extinct 1721	
Wilkinson of Ashbourne	1630	Wilkinson	exant	No male heirs. Title is set to die;
Williams-Wynn of Grays Inn	1688	Williams, Williams-Wynn	extant	
Williams of Eltham	1674	Williams	extinct 1804	
Williams of Guernevet	1644	Williams	extinct 1695	
Williams of Llangibby	1642	Williams	extinct 1753	
Williams of Marnhull	1642	Williams	extinct 1680	
Williams of Minster	1642	Williams	extinct 1669	
Williams of Penrhyn	1661	Williams, Williams-Bulkeley	extant	
Williams of Vaynol	1622	Williams	extinct 1696	
Williamson of East Markham	1642	Williamson	extinct 2000	
Willoughby of Risley	1611	Willoughby	extinct 1649	
Willoughby of Willoughby	1660	Willoughby	extinct 1671	
Willoughby of Wollaton	1677	Willoughby	extant	created Baron Middleton (1712) in Great Britain.
Willys of Fen Ditton	1641	Willys	extinct 1732	
Willys of Fen Ditton	1646	Willys	extinct 1701	
Wilson of Eastbourne	1661	Wilson, Maryon-Wilson	extinct 1978	
Winch of Hawnes	1660	Winch	extinct 1703	
Winchcombe of Bucklebury	1661	Winchcombe	extinct 1703	
Windebank of Haines Hill	1645	Windebanke	extinct 1719	
Winford of Glashampton	1702	Winford	extinct 1744	
Wingfield of Goodwins	1627	Wingfield	extinct after 1727	
Winn of Nostel	1660	Wynne, Winn, Allanson-Winn	extinct 1994	Merged with the barony of Headley in 1833.
Wintour of Hodington	1642	Wintour	extinct 1658	
Wiseman of Canfield Hall	1628	Wiseman	extant	
Wiseman of Rivenhall	1660	Wiseman	extinct 1688	
Wiseman of Thundersley	1628	Wiseman	extinct 1658	
Wishart of Clifton Hall	1706	Wishart	dormant 1821	
Wittewrong of Stantonbury	1662	Wittewrong	extinct 1771	
Wodehouse of Wilberhall	1611	Wodehouse	extant	created Baron Wodehouse (1797) in the Peerage of Great Britain; created Earl of Kimberley (1866) in the Peerage of the United Kingdom.
Wolryche of Dudmaston	1641	Wolryche	extinct 1723	
Wolseley of Morton	1628	Wolseley	extant	
Wolstenholme of London	1665	Wolstenholme	extinct 1762	
Wood of Bonnytown	1666	Wood	extinct 1738	
Wood	1657	Wood	extinct 1671	
Worsley of Appuldurcombe	1611	Worsley	extinct 1825	
Wortley of Wortley	1611	Wortley	extinct 1665	
Wray of Ashby	1660	Wray	extinct 1687	
Wray of Glentworth	1611	Wray	extinct 1809	
Wrey of Trebitch	1628	Wrey	extant	
Wright of Cranham Hall	1661	Wright	extinct 1738	
Wright of Dagenham	1660	Wright	extinct 1681	
Wright of Dennington	1646	Wright	extinct 1670	
Wroth of Blenden Hall	1660	Wroth	extinct 1721	
Wrottesley of Wrottesley	1642	Wrottesley	extant	created Baron Wrottesley (1838) in the Peerage of the United Kingdom.
Wyndham of Orchard	1661	Wyndham	extinct 1845	merged with the earldom of Egremont in 1750.
Wyndham of Pilsden Court	1641	Wyndham	extinct 1663	
Wyndham of Trent	1673	Wyndham	extinct 1719	
Wynn of Gwydir	1611	Wynn	extinct 1719	
Wytham of Goldsborough	1683	Wytham	extinct 1689	
Wyvill of Constable Burton	1611	Wyvill	dormant 1774	

== Y ==
Title	Date of creation	Surname	Current status	Notes
Yate of Buckland	1622	Yate	extinct 1690	
Yeamans of Bristol	1665	Yeamans	extinct 1788	
Yeamans of Redland	1666	Yeamans	extinct 1687	
Yelverton of Easton Mauduit	1641	Yelverton	extinct 1799	merged with Baron Grey de Ruthyn.
Yelverton of Rougham	1620	Yelverton	extinct 1649	
Yonge of Culliton	1661	Yonge	extinct 1812	
Young of London	1629	Young	extinct 1651	

== See also ==
- List of extant Baronetcies
- List of baronetcies in the Baronetage of Ireland
- List of baronetcies in the Baronetage of Nova Scotia
- List of baronetcies in the Baronetage of the United Kingdom
- List of baronetcies in the Baronetage of Great Britain
