= George Jason =

George Jason may refer to:

- George Jason (magician), Magicians Guild of America
- George Jason of the Jason Baronets

== See also ==
- Jason George, American actor and model
