= Plomer =

Plomer is a surname. Notable people with the surname include:

- Plomer baronets
- John Plomer (c. 1410 – c. 1483), English composer
- Michèle Plomer (born 1965), Canadian writer and translator
- William Plomer (1903–1973), South African and British writer

== See also ==
- Ploner
- Plumer (disambiguation)
