= Robert Jason =

Robert Jason may refer to:

- Robert Jason, see TRANSform Me
- Robert Jason of the Jason Baronets
