= Colbrand =

Colbrand is a surname. Notable people with the surname include:

- Colbrand (giant), a giant from English mythology, killed by Guy of Warwick
- Colbrand baronets
- James Colbrand (before 1544–1600), English politician
