= Mottet =

Mottet is a surname. It may refer to:

- Benoît Mottet de La Fontaine (1745–1820), French navy officer and officer of colonies ministry
- Charly Mottet (born 1962), French cyclist
- Kacey Mottet Klein (born 1998), Swiss actress
- Killian Mottet (born 1991), Swiss ice hockey player
- Marvin Mottet (1930–2016), Roman Catholic priest in the Diocese of Davenport in Iowa
- Maxime Mottet (born 1991), Belgian trap shooter

== See also ==
- Mottet baronets, or Mottet Baronetcy of Liège, title in the Baronetage of England
