= Osbaldiston =

Osbaldiston is a surname. Notable people with the surname include:

- John Osbaldiston Field (1913–1985), British colonial administrator
- Paul Osbaldiston (born 1964), English-born Canadian footballer

== See also ==
- Osbaldeston
- Osbaldeston (surname)
- Osbaldistone (disambiguation)
