= Carpentier family =

Extinct baronetcy in the Baronetage of England

- Current region: Kingdom of Belgium
- Origin: Decize, County of Nevers, Kingdom of France
- Titles: Count (Belgium; current); Count (French Empire); Baronet (England; extinct); Seigneur (Kingdom of France; extinct)
- Distinctions: Order of Saint Louis
- Estates: Machy, Marigny, Ratilly, Changy, les Pavillons, Vanzé, Beaudéduit.
- Cadet branches: de Changy de Marigny

The Carpentier family is a family of French origins. One of its branches moved to the kingdoms of England and Scotland in the 15th century. Another branch, the Carpentier de Changy family, has been part of the Belgian nobility since 1892.

== Branches ==
- Carpentier de Changy
- Carpentier de Marigny

== Origins ==
This family descends from Colinet Carpentier, notary, attorney and manufacturer in Decize. He married Jehanneton de Savigny there on 28 February 1442

== Notable members ==
- Jehan Carpentier, merchant, master of forges, and councillor of Nevers from 1564.
- Jacques Carpentier de Marigny [fr] (1615-1673), satirical poet and prose writer, prior of Cessy, chamberlain of Queen Christina of Sweden, in the court of the prince of Condé then of the cardinal of Retz, advisor and butler of the King.
- Francois Carpentier (1623-1676), King's Musketeer, volunteer in the company of the gendarmes of the duke of Orleans.
- Sir Arthur Marigni Carpentier, 1st Baronnet Carpentier, of France.
- François Carpentier de Changy (1714-1797), King's Musketeer, participated in the battles of Fontenoy, Rocoux, and Lauffeld and in the siege of Bergen op Zoom where he was injured.
- François Ignace Carpentier, Count de Changy [fr] (1753-1812), French royalist officer.
- Count Eugène Carpentier de Changy (1879-1936), Head of Protocol at the Belgian Ministry of Foreign Affairs.
- Alain Carpentier de Changy (1922-1994), Belgian racing driver.

== Baronetcy ==
The Carpentier Baronetcy, of France, was a title in the Baronetage of England. It was created under the reign of Richard Cromwell on 9 October 1658 for Arthur Marigni Carpentier, a gentleman of French origin. Nothing further is known of him or the title. The Baronetcy is now extinct.

=== Carpentier baronets, of France (1658) ===
- Sir Arthur Marigni Carpentier, 1st Baronet

== Heraldry ==
Azure, a mullet or between three crescents argent.

== See also ==
- List of baronetcies in the Baronetage of England
