= Berkeley baronets =

Extinct baronetcies of England

There have been two baronetcies created for persons with the surname Berkeley, both in the Baronetage of England.

The Berkeley Baronetcy, of Wymondham in the County of Leicester, was created in the Baronetage of England on 29 June 1611 for Henry Berkeley of Wymondham, Leicestershire, a descendant of Thomas Berkeley, younger son of Thomas de Berkeley, 1st Baron Berkeley. It became extinct at his death in about 1630.

The Berkeley Baronetcy, of Bruton in the County of Somerset, was created in the Baronetage of England on 2 July 1660 for Maurice Berkeley, eldest son of Sir Charles Berkeley, of Bruton in Somerset (who was descended from Maurice de Berkeley, 2nd Baron Berkeley). He succeeded his father as 3rd Viscount Fitzhardinge in 1668, and died 13 June 1690, when the baronetcy became extinct and the viscountcy passed to his younger brother, John Berkeley, 4th Viscount Fitzhardinge.

== Berkeley baronets, of Wymondham (1611) ==
- Sir Henry Berkeley, 1st Baronet (1566–1630)

== Berkeley baronets, of Bruton (1660) ==
- Sir Maurice Berkeley, 1st Baronet (1628–1690) (succeeded as 3rd Viscount Fitzhardinge in 1668)

== See also ==
- Baron Berkeley
- Viscount Fitzhardinge

Baronetage of England
Preceded by Barrington baronets	Berkeley baronets 29 June 1611	Succeeded by Wentworth baronets
