= Osbaldeston (surname) =

Osbaldeston is a surname. Notable people with the surname include:

- Edward Osbaldeston, (c. 1560–1594), Catholic martyr
- George Osbaldeston, (1786–1866), cricketer
- Gordon Osbaldeston, (born 1930), Canadian civil servant
- Lambert Osbaldeston, (1594–1659), headmaster of Westminster School
- Nancy Osbaldeston (born 1989), English ballet dancer
- Richard Osbaldeston (Attorney General) (c. 1585–1640), Anglo-Irish lawyer
- Richard Osbaldeston (1691–1764), Bishop of London
- Herbert Osbaldeston Duncan (1862–1945), English racing bicyclist, journalist, and pioneer of the British automobile industry
- William Osbaldeston (died 1707) (1631–1707), English politician

== See also ==
- Osbaldeston baronets
