= Sir Edward Tyrrell, 1st Baronet, of Lynn =

Anglo-Irish landowner and Jacobite

Sir Edward Tyrrell, 1st Baronet (died 6 February 1691) was an Anglo-Irish landowner and Jacobite.

== Biography ==
Tyrrell was High Sheriff of Westmeath in 1677 and Justice of the Peace for the county in 1681. On 20 May 1686 he was created a baronet, of Lynn in the Baronetage of England, with special remainder to his nephew Edward and his heirs male. A supporter of James II following the Glorious Revolution, Tyrrell was a Member of Parliament for Belturbet in the Irish House of Commons during the Patriot Parliament of 1689. James also appointed him as Supervisor of County Cork and County Waterford.

In April 1690 he was given a commission in Luttrell's Dragoons during the Williamite War in Ireland. Tyrrell was taken prisoner by Williamite forces at Cork later that year and was indicted of High Treason against William III, to whom, however, he had never sworn allegiance. Tyrrell died in February 1691 while awaiting trial as a prisoner, and was posthumously attainted of his title and estates. As such, his baronetcy is considered to have become extinct upon his death.

He had married Eleanor, daughter of Sir Dudly Loftus of Rathfarnham as her third husband, and had by her one daughter, Katherine, who married Robert Edgworth. A portion of Tyrrell's property at Longwood, County Meath was restored to his daughter by special Act of Parliament in 1702.

Parliament of Ireland
Preceded by Francis Butler; Thomas Warsopp	Member of Parliament for Belturbet; 1689; With: Philip Tuite	Succeeded by Francis Butler; John Warburton
Baronetage of England
New creation	Baronet (of Lynn); 1686–1691	Attainted; Extinct
