= Seyliard baronets =

Extinct baronetcy in the Baronetage of England

The Sylyard, later Seylyiard, later Seyliard Baronetcy, of Delaware in Brasted, County of Kent), was a title in the Baronetage of England. It was created on 18 June 1661 for John Sylyard. The second and third Baronets used the spelling Seylyiard. The fourth Baronet used the spelling Seyliard. The title became extinct on his death in 1701 at the age of one.

The Seyliards had been settled in Hever, Kent since the twelfth century. Delaware was acquired the Seyliard family by marriage in the fifteenth century.

== Sylyard, later Seylyiard, later Seyliard baronets, of Delaware (1661) ==
Escutcheon of the Sylyard baronets

- Sir John Sylyard, 1st Baronet (c. 1613 – 1667)

He married Mary Glover.

- Sir Thomas Seylyiard, 2nd Baronet (c. 1648 – 1692)

He married 1) Frances, daughter of Sir Francis Wyatt of Bexley, Kent and in 1687 2) Margaret(d. 1690), widow of Major Dunch (d. 1679) of Pusey, Oxfordshire and daughter of Philip Wharton, 4th Baron Wharton.

- Sir Thomas Seylyiard, 3rd Baronet (c. 1673 – 1701)

He married Elizabeth, daughter and heiress of Sir Sandys Fortescue of Fallapit, East Allington, Devon.

- Sir John Seyliard, 4th Baronet (1700–1701)
