= Yelverton baronets =

Extinct baronetcy in the Baronetage of England

Escutcheon of the Yelverton baronets

There have been two baronetcies created for persons with the surname Yelverton, both in the Baronetage of England.

The Yelverton Baronetcy, of Rougham in the County of Norfolk, was created in the Baronetage of England on 31 May 1630 for William Yelverton. The title became extinct in 1649.

The Yelverton Baronetcy, of Easton Mauduit in the County of Northampton, was created in the Baronetage of England on 30 June 1641 for Christopher Yelverton, Member of Parliament for Newport and Bossiney, grandson of the Speaker of Parliament Christopher Yelverton, and a cousin of the Yelverton baronets of Rougham. Sir Christopher's son, the second baronet, was MP for Northampton, and his elder son, Sir Charles, succeeded as 14th Baron Grey de Ruthyn, but died without issue. Lord Grey de Ruthyn's younger brother, Henry, succeeded to the barony and baronetcy, and was created Viscount Longueville. Lord Longueville's son, Talbot Yelverton, was raised further in the peerage, being created Earl of Sussex in 1717. The baronetcy, along with the earldom of Sussex and the viscountcy of Longueville, became extinct on the death of the 3rd Earl of Sussex (the seventh baronet) in 1799.

== Yelverton baronets, of Rougham (1620) ==
- Sir William Yelverton, 1st Baronet (c. 1558–1631)
- Sir William Yelverton, 2nd Baronet (c. 1590–1648)
- Sir William Yelverton, 3rd Baronet (died 1649)

== Yelverton baronets, of Easton Mauduit (1641) ==
- Sir Christopher Yelverton, 1st Baronet (died 1654)
- Sir Henry Yelverton, 2nd Baronet (1633–1670)
- Sir Charles Yelverton, 3rd Baronet (1657–1679) (succeeded as 14th Baron Grey de Ruthyn in 1676)
- Henry Yelverton, 15th Baron Grey de Ruthyn, 1st Viscount Longueville (c. 1664–1704) (created Viscount Longueville in 1690) married Barbara Talbot
- Talbot Yelverton, 2nd Viscount Longueville, 1st Earl of Sussex (1690–1731) (created Earl of Sussex in 1717)

For the remaining Yelverton baronets, see Earl of Sussex.

== See also ==
- Baron Grey de Ruthyn
- Viscount Longueville
- Earl of Sussex
