= Osbaldistone =

Osbaldistone may refer to:

- Frank Osbaldistone, a character in the book and television series Rob Roy
- Jane Osbaldistone de Trevor de Boulogne, a character in the book and television series Bill the Minder

== See also ==
- Osbaldiston
