= Ploner =

Ploner is a surname. Notable people with the surname include:

- Alexander Ploner (born 1978), Italian alpine skier
- Giuseppe Ploner (born 1959), Italian cross country skier

== See also ==
- Plomer
