= Tracy baronets =

Extinct baronetcy in the Baronetage of England

- Escutcheon of the Tracy baronets of Stanway
- Creation date: 1611
- Status: extinct
- Extinction date: 1677
- Seat(s): Stanway House

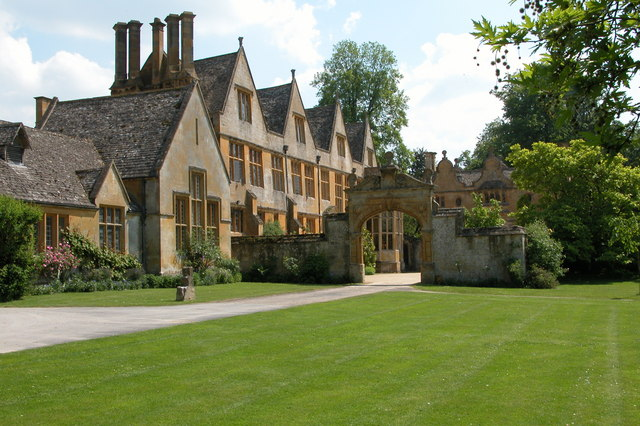
Stanway House, the seat of the Tracy baronets

The Tracy Baronetcy, of Stanway in the County of Gloucester, was a title in the Baronetage of England. It was created on 29 June 1611 for Paul Tracy. He was the eldest son of the lay Protestant reformer Richard Tracy. The title became extinct on the death of the fifth Baronet in 1678. The seat of the Tracy family was Stanway House, Stanway, Gloucestershire.

== Tracy baronets, of Stanway (1611) ==
- Sir Paul Tracy, 1st Baronet (c. 1550–1626)
- Sir Richard Tracy, 2nd Baronet (c. 1581–1637)
- Sir Humphrey Tracy, 3rd Baronet (c. 1611–1658)
- Sir Richard Tracy, 4th Baronet (died 1666)
- Sir John Tracy, 5th Baronet (died 1678)

Lt. Thomas Tracy of Norwich, Connecticut, American Colonies b. 1610 d. Nov. 7, 1685, the 9th son of Sir Paul Tracy, should have inherited the title after the death of his brother Sir John Tracy in 1678. All of the other brothers died sine prole.

Baronetage of England
Preceded by Gresley baronets	Tracy baronets 29 June 1611	Succeeded by Wentworth baronets
