= Gans baronets =

Extinct baronetcy in the Baronetage of England

The Gans Baronetcy, of The Netherlands, was a title in the Baronetage of England. It was created on 29 June 1682 for Cornelius Gans, with remainder to a Stephen Groulart. However, nothing further is known of the baronetcy.

== Gans baronets, of The Netherlands (1682) ==
- Sir Cornelius Gans, 1st Baronet (died c. 1700)
