= Werden baronets =

Extinct baronetcy in the Baronetage of England

- Escutcheon of the Werden baronets of Cholmeaton
- Creation date: 1672
- Status: extinct
- Extinction date: 1758

The Werden Baronetcy, of Cholmeaton in the County of Chester, was a title in the Baronetage of England. It was created on 28 November 1672 for John Werden, subsequently member of parliament for Reigate. The title became extinct on the death of the second Baronet in 1758. The latter's daughter, Lucy Werden, married Charles Beauclerk, 2nd Duke of St Albans, grandson of Charles II.

== Werden baronets, of Cholmeaton (1672) ==
- Sir John Werden, 1st Baronet (1640–1716)
- Sir John Werden, 2nd Baronet (1683–1758)
