= Sudbury baronets =

Extinct baronetcy in the Baronetage of England

The Sudbury Baronetcy, of Eldon in the County of Durham, was a title in the Baronetage of England. It was created on 25 June 1685 for John Sudbury. The title became extinct on his death in 1691.

== Sudbury baronets, of Eldon (1685) ==
- Sir John Sudbury, 1st Baronet (died 1691)
