= Sherard baronets =

Extinct baronetcy in the Baronetage of England

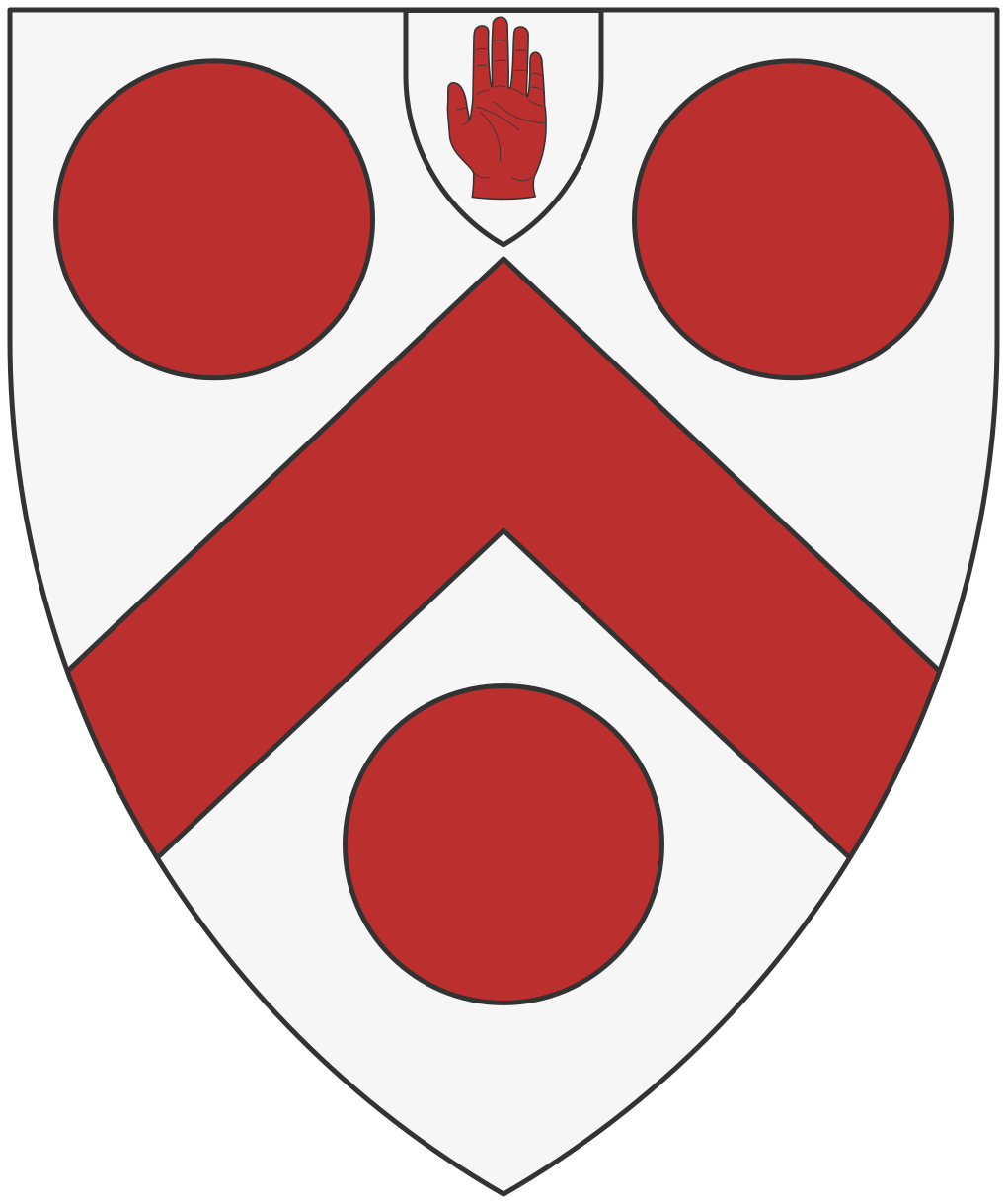
The coat of arms of the Sherards of Lopthorp

The Sherard Baronetcy, of Lopthorp in the County of Lincoln, was a title in the Baronetage of England.

== History ==
It was created on 25 May 1674 for John Sherard, with remainder to his brothers and the male issue of their bodies. He died unmarried and was succeeded according to the special remainder by his younger brother, the second Baronet. The latter was also unmarried and was succeeded by another brother, the third Baronet. The title became extinct on the death of the third Baronet's son, the fourth Baronet, in 1748.

== Sherard baronets, of Lopthorp (1674) ==
- Sir John Sherard, 1st Baronet (c. 1662–1725)
- Sir Richard Sherard, 2nd Baronet (c. 1666–1730)
- Sir Brownlow Sherard, 3rd Baronet (1668–1736)
- Sir Brownlow Sherard, 4th Baronet (c. 1702–1748)

== See also ==
- Baron Sherard
- Earl of Harborough
