= Duddlestone baronets =

Extinct baronetcy in the Baronetage of England

The Duddlestone Baronetcy, of Bristol in the County of Gloucester, was a title in the Baronetage of England. It was created on 11 January 1692 for Sir John Duddlestone, a Bristol merchant. The title became extinct on the death of his grandson, the second Baronet, in c. 1750.

== Duddlestone baronets, of Bristol (1692) ==
- Sir John Duddlestone, 1st Baronet (died c. 1716)
- Sir John Duddlestone, 2nd Baronet (died c. 1750)
