= Rudston baronets =

Extinct baronetcy in the Baronetage of England

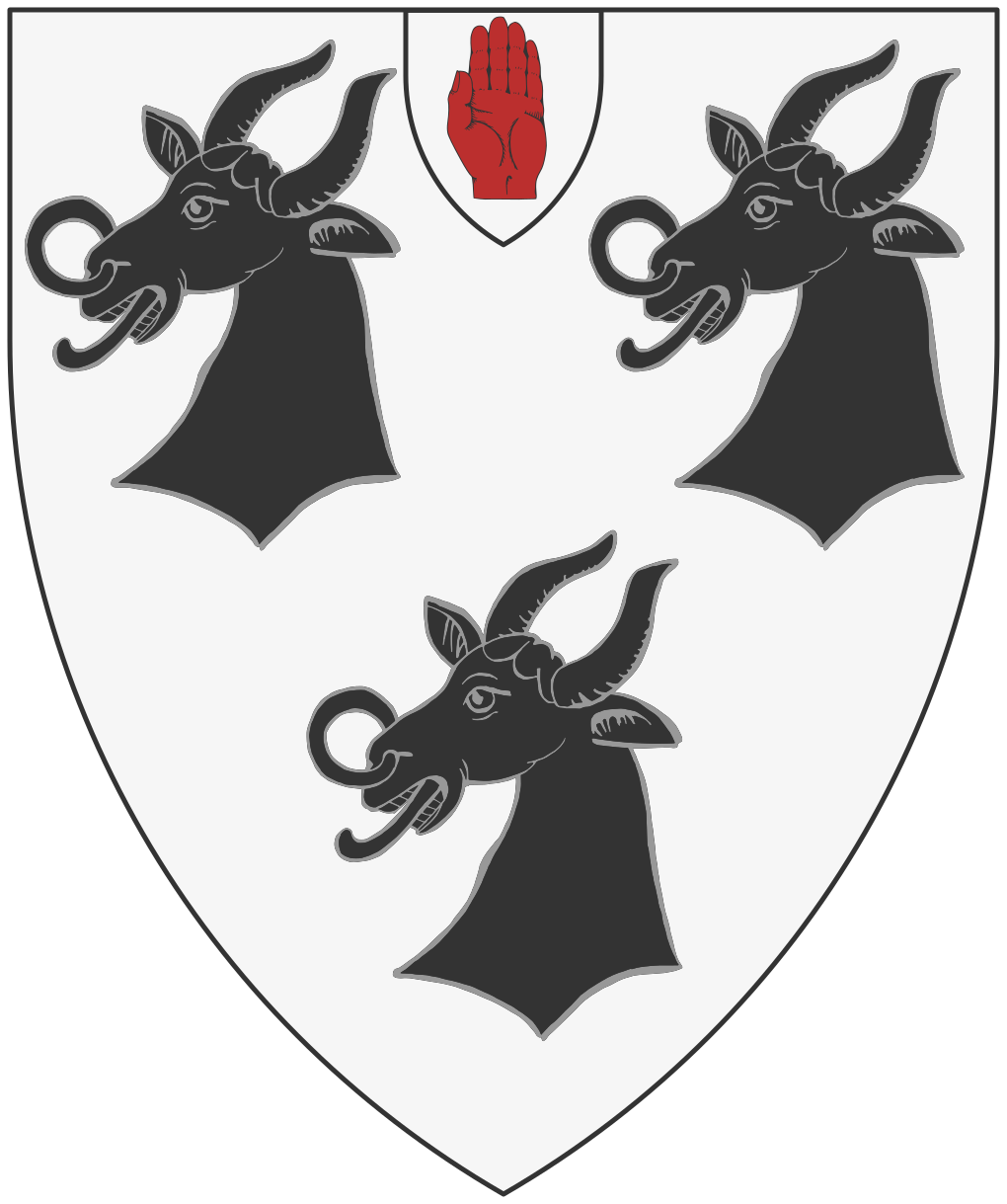
The coat of arms of the Rudston baronets.

The Rudston Baronetcy, of Hayton in the County of York, was a title in the Baronetage of England. It was created on 29 August 1642 for Walter Rudston, at whose manor house in Hayton. King Charles I had stayed for a few days on his way from York to Hull in April of that year. The title became extinct with the death of the third Baronet in 1709.

== Rudston baronets, of Hayton (1642) ==
- Sir Walter Rudston, 1st Baronet (c. 1597 – 29 December 1650)
- Sir Thomas Rudston, 2nd Baronet (8 August 1639 – 24 October 1707)
- Sir Thomas Rudston, 3rd Baronet (7 April 1681 – 1 December 1709)

(Contributor note : dates supplied from Hayton Parish Register)
