= Sadlier baronets =

Title in the Baronetage of England

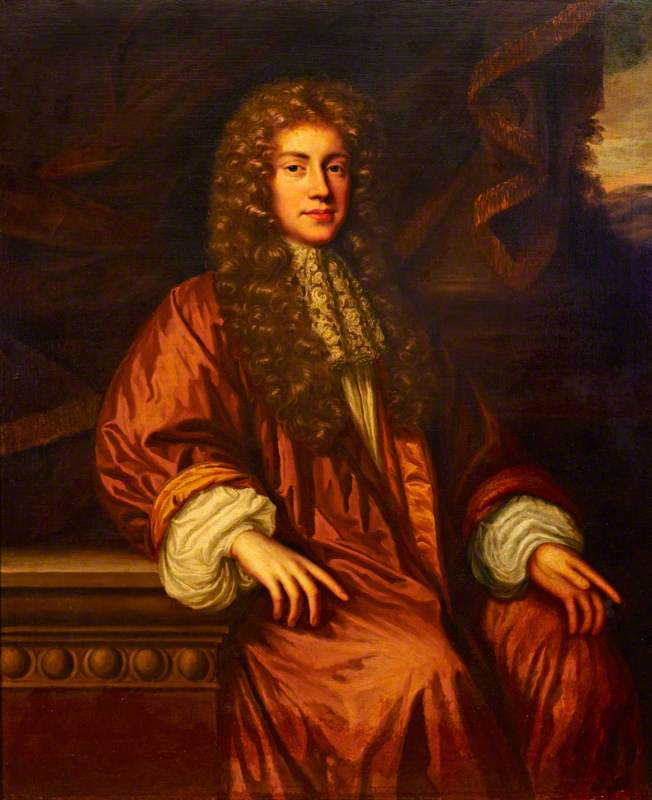
Sir Edwin Sadlier, 2nd Baronet

The Sadlier Baronetcy, of Temple Dinsey in the County of Hertford, was a title in the Baronetage of England. It was created on 3 December 1661 for Edwyn Sadlier. The title became extinct on the death of the second Baronet in 1719.

== Sadlier baronets, of Temple Dinsey (1661) ==
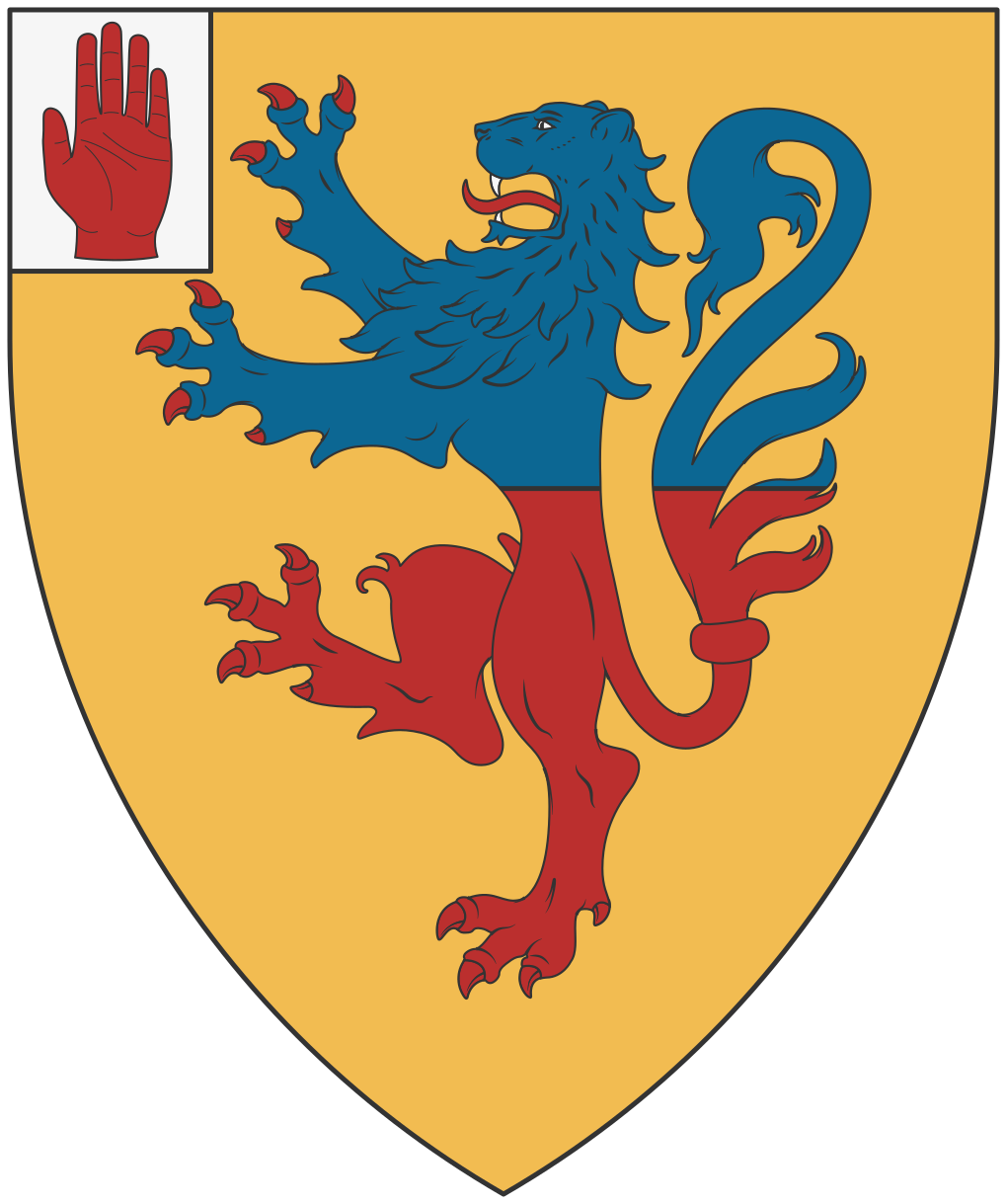
The coat of arms of the Sadlier baronets of Temple Dinsey

- Sir Edwyn Sadlier, 1st Baronet (c. 1620 – 1672)
- Sir Edwin Sadlier, 2nd Baronet (c. 1656 – 1719)
