= Vitus baronets =

Extinct baronetcy in the Baronetage of England

The Vitus Baronetcy, of Limerick, was a title in the Baronetage of England. It was created on 29 June 1677 for Ignatius Vitus, subsequently Ambassador to the United Provinces, with remainder to his nephew Ignatius Maximilian Vitus, who was created Marquis D'Abbeville by James II. The title was forfeited in 1691. Vitus died in 1694.

== Vitus baronets, of Limerick (1677) ==
- Sir Ignatius Vitus, 1st Baronet (c. 1626–1694)
