= Darcy baronets =

Extinct baronetcy in the Baronetage of England

The Darcy Baronetcy, of St Osith's in the County of Essex, was a title in the Baronetage of England. It was created on 19 June 1660 for Thomas Darcy, subsequently Member of Parliament for Maldon. The title became extinct on the early death of his son, the second Baronet, in 1698.

The Earls Rivers of the second creation were members of another branch of the Darcy family.

== Darcy baronets, of St Osith's (1660) ==
- Sir Thomas Darcy, 1st Baronet (1632–1693)
- Sir George Darcy, 2nd Baronet (c. 1677–1698)
