= Paylor baronets =

Extinct baronetcy in the Baronetage of England

The Paylor Baronetcy, of Thoralby in the County of York, was a title in the Baronetage of England. It was created on 28 June 1642 for Edward Paylor. The second Baronet sat as member of parliament for Malton. The title became extinct on his death in 1705.

Escutcheon of the Paylor baronets

== Paylor baronets, of Thoralby (1642) ==
- Sir Edward Paylor, 1st Baronet (died c. 1642)
- Sir Watkinson Paylor, 2nd Baronet (c. 1634–1705)
