= Rudd baronets =

Extinct baronetcy in the Baronetage of England

- Escutcheon of the Rudd baronets of Aberglassney
- Creation date: 1628
- Status: extinct
- Extinction date: 1739

The Rudd Baronetcy, of Aberglassney in the County of Carmarthen, was a title in the Baronetage of England. It was created on 8 December 1628 for Richard Rudd. He was the son of Anthony Rudd, Bishop of St David's. The second baronet sat as member of parliament for Higham Ferrers and Carmarthenshire. The title became extinct on the death of the fourth Baronet in 1739.

== Rudd baronets, of Aberglassney (1628) ==
- Sir Richard Rudd, 1st Baronet (died 1664)
- Sir Rice Rudd, 2nd Baronet (c. 1643–1701)
- Sir Anthony Rudd, 3rd Baronet (died 1725)
- Sir John Rudd, 4th Baronet (died 1739)
