= De Raedt baronets =

Extinct baronetcy in the Baronetage of England

The de Raedt Baronetcy, of The Hague, was a title in the Baronetage of England. It was created on 30 May 1660 for Gualter de Raedt. Nothing further is known of him or the title.

== de Raedt baronets, of The Hague (1660) ==
- Sir Gualter de Raedt, 1st Baronet
