= Tyrrell baronets =

Extinct baronetcy in the Baronetage of England

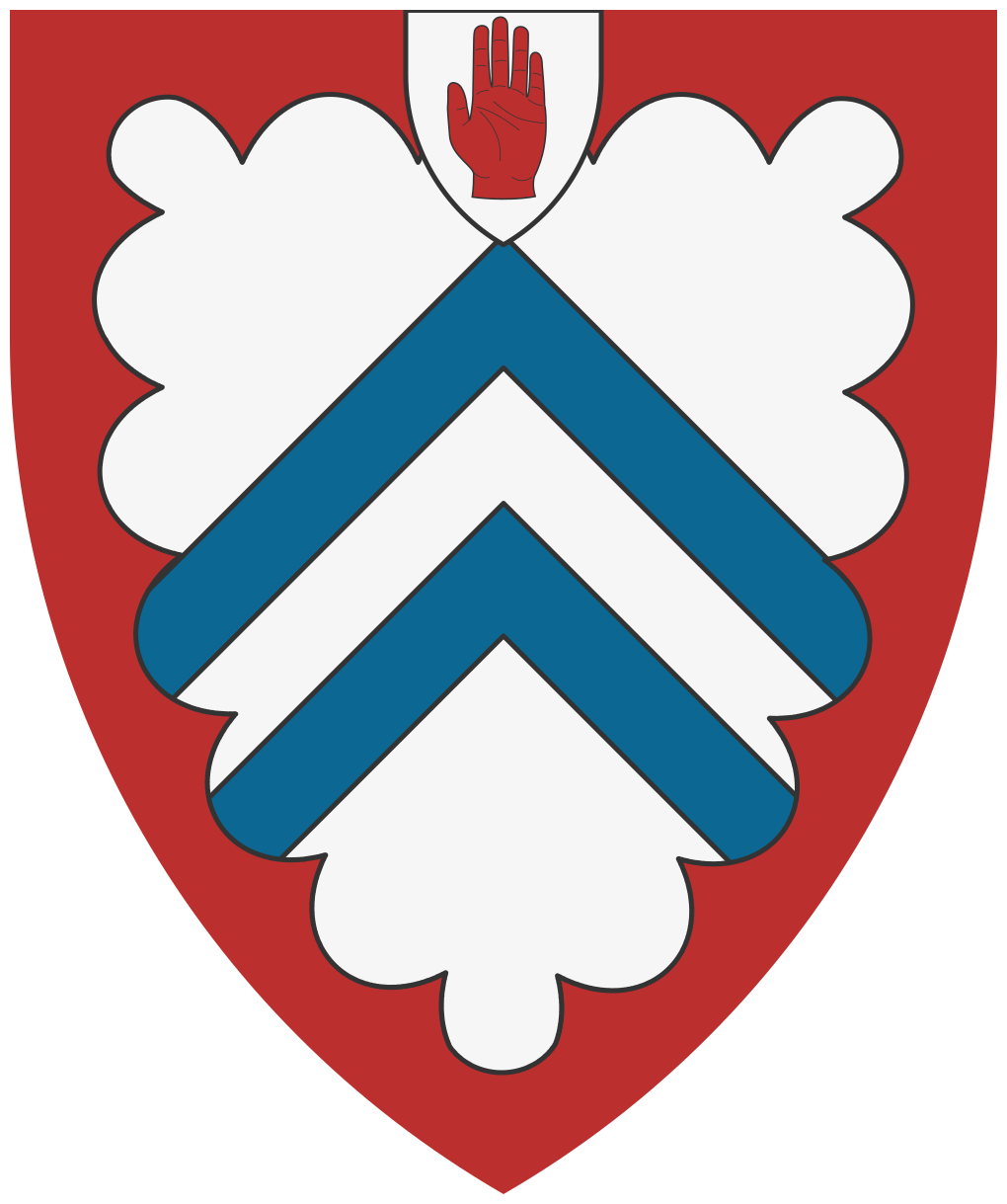
Arms of the Tyrrell baronets.

There have been five baronetcies created for persons with the surname Tyrrell, all in the Baronetage of England. All five creations are extinct, as is the Tyrell baronetcy. The six creations all claim a descent from Walter Tirell, the reputed accidental killer of King William II.

The Tyrrell Baronetcy, of Thornton in the County of Buckingham, was created in the Baronetage of England on 31 October 1627 for Edward Tyrrell. On 19 February 1638 he surrendered the title to the Crown and obtained a second patent with remainder to his second son Toby (barring his eldest son Robert from succeeding), with the precedence of the earlier creation. However, the House of Lords decided that this was unlawful. There were consequently two creations of the baronetcy. The eldest son Robert succeeded in the 1627 creation while his younger brother Toby succeeded in the 1638 creation. Sir Robert died unmarried and was succeeded by his brother, Toby. The titles became extinct on the death of the seventh Baronet in 1749.

The Tyrrell Baronetcy, of Hanslape in the County of Buckingham, was created in the Baronetage of England on 20 July 1665 for Peter Tyrrell. He was the younger son of Sir Thomas Tyrrell, a judge of the Court of Common Pleas. The title became extinct on the death of the second Baronet in 1714.

The Tirell, later Tyrrell Baronetcy, of Springfield in the County of Essex, was created in the Baronetage of England on 22 October 1666 for John Tirell. They were members of the same family as the Tyrrell Baronets of Thornton. The second and subsequent baronets used the surname Tyrrell. The title became extinct on the death of the fifth Baronet in 1766.

The Tyrrell Baronetcy, of Lynn in the County of Westmeath, was created in the Baronetage of England on 20 May 1686 for Edward Tyrrell. The title became extinct on his death in 1691.

== Tyrrell baronets, of Thornton (1627) ==
- Sir Edward Tyrrell, 1st Baronet (died 1656)
- Sir Robert Tyrrell, 2nd Baronet
- Sir Toby Tyrrell, 3rd Baronet (died 1671)
- Sir Thomas Tyrrell, 4th Baronet (died 1705)
- Sir Harry Tyrrell, 5th Baronet (c. 1670–1708)
- Sir Thomas Tyrrell, 6th Baronet (c. 1693–1718)
- Sir Harry Tyrrell, 7th Baronet (c. 1695–1720)
- Sir Charles Tyrrell, 8th Baronet (1708–1749)

== Tyrrell baronets, of Thornton (1638) ==
- Sir Edward Tyrrell, 1st Baronet (died 1656)
- Sir Toby Tyrrell, 2nd Baronet (died 1671)
- Sir Thomas Tyrrell, 3rd Baronet (died 1705)
- Sir Harry Tyrrell, 4th Baronet (c. 1670–1708)
- Sir Thomas Tyrrell, 5th Baronet (c. 1693–1718)
- Sir Harry Tyrrell, 6th Baronet (c. 1695–1720)
- Sir Charles Tyrrell, 7th Baronet (1708–1749)

== Tyrrell baronets, of Hanslape (1665) ==
- Sir Peter Tyrrell, 1st Baronet (died 1711)
- Sir Thomas Tyrrell, 2nd Baronet (c. 1670–1714)

== Tyrrell baronets, of Springfield (1666) ==
- Sir John Tirell, 1st Baronet (c. 1636–1673)
- Sir Charles Tyrrell, 2nd Baronet (c. 1660–1715)
- Sir John Tyrrell, 3rd Baronet (c. 1685–1729)
- Sir Charles Tyrrell, 4th Baronet (c. 1725–1735)
- Sir John Tyrrell, 5th Baronet (c. 1728–1766)

== Tyrrell baronets, of Lynn (1686) ==
- Sir Edward Tyrrell, 1st Baronet (died 1691)

== See also ==
- Tyrell Baronets
