= Viscount Wentworth =

Viscount Wentworth was a title used by:

- Thomas Wentworth, 1st Earl of Strafford (1593–1641), English statesman and a major figure in the period leading up to the English Civil War
- Baron Wentworth
  - Edward Noel, 1st Viscount Wentworth (1715–1774)
  - Thomas Noel, 2nd Viscount Wentworth (1745–1815), British politician
