= Compton baronets =

Extinct baronetcy in the Baronetage of England

The Compton Baronetcy, of Hartbury in the County of Gloucester, was a title in the Baronetage of England. It was created on 6 May 1686 for William Compton. The title became extinct on the death of the fifth Baronet in 1773.

== Compton baronets, of Hartbury (1686) ==
- Sir William Compton, 1st Baronet (died c. 1698)
- Sir William Compton, 2nd Baronet (died 1731)
- Sir William Compton, 3rd Baronet (died 1758)
- Sir William Compton, 4th Baronet (died 1760)
- Sir Walter Abingdon Compton, 5th Baronet (died 1773)
