= Ashby baronets =

Extinct baronetcy in the Baronetage of England

Ashby baronets of Harefield
- Escutcheon of the Ashby baronets of Harefield
- Creation date: 1622
- Status: extinct
- Extinction date: 1623

The Ashby Baronetcy, of Harefield in the County of Middlesex, was a title in the Baronetage of England. It was created on 18 June 1622 for Sir Francis Ashby, a descendant of the family which had held Breakspears, Harefield, Middlesex, since the 15th century.

Sir Francis Ashby (1595-1623) was the son of Sir Robert Ashby of Harefield and Dorothy, daughter of Francis Haydon of Watford. He matriculated at Gray's Inn in 1607 and was knighted in 1617.

Sir Francis was the subject of a complaint to the Earl Marshal by Sir Michael Longueville, that Ashby had insulted and defamed him.

The title became extinct on his death, without heirs, on 23 December 1623. His widow Joane died in 1635.

== Ashby baronets, of Harefield (1622) ==
- Sir Francis Ashby, 1st Baronet (1595–1623)
