= Lawday baronets =

Extinct baronetcy in the Baronetage of England

The Lawday Baronetcy, of Exeter in the County of Devon, was a title in the Baronetage of England. It was created on 9 November 1642 for Richard Lawday. The title became extinct on his death in 1648 while fighting for the Royalist cause in the Civil War. The title was claimed in the 19th century by a Mr Charles Lawday, of Bath, Somerset.

== Lawday baronets, of Exeter (1642) ==
- Sir Richard Lawday, 1st Baronet (died 1643)
