= Shiers baronets =

Extinct baronetcy in the Baronetage of England

- Escutcheon of the Shiers baronets of Slyfield
- Creation date: 1684
- Status: extinct
- Extinction date: 1685

The Shiers Baronetcy, of Slyfield in the County of Surrey, was a title in the Baronetage of England. It was created on 16 October 1684 for George Shiers. He was the grandson of George Shiers, who had purchased Slyfield House in 1614. The title became extinct on Shiers's early death in 1685.

== Shiers baronets, of Slyfield (1684) ==
- Sir George Shiers, 1st Baronet (c. 1660–1685)
