= Yeamans baronets =

Extinct baronetcy in the Baronetage of England

There have been two baronetcies created for persons with the surname Yemans, both in the Baronetage of England. Both creations are extinct.

The Yeamans Baronetcy, of Bristol in the County of Gloyucester, was created in the Baronetage of England on 12 January 1665 for John Yeamans. The title became extinct on the death of the sixth Baronet in 1788.

The Yeamans Baronetcy, of Redland in the County of Gloucester, was created in the Baronetage of England on 31 December 1666. The title became extinct on his death in 1687.

Escutcheon of the Yeamans baronets

== Yeamans baronets, of Bristol (1665) ==
- Sir John Yeamans, 1st Baronet (died c. 1680)
- Sir William Yeamans, 2nd Baronet (died c. 1685)
- Sir John Yeamans, 3rd Baronet (died c. 1690)
- Sir John Yeamans, 4th Baronet (c. 1689–c. 1730)
- Sir John Yeamans, 5th Baronet (c. 1720–c. 1780)
- Sir Robert Yeamans, 6th Baronet (c. 1742–1788)

== Yeamans baronets, of Redland (1666) ==
- Sir Robert Yeamans, 1st Baronet (died 1687)
