= Snowe baronets =

Extinct baronetcy in the Baronetage of England

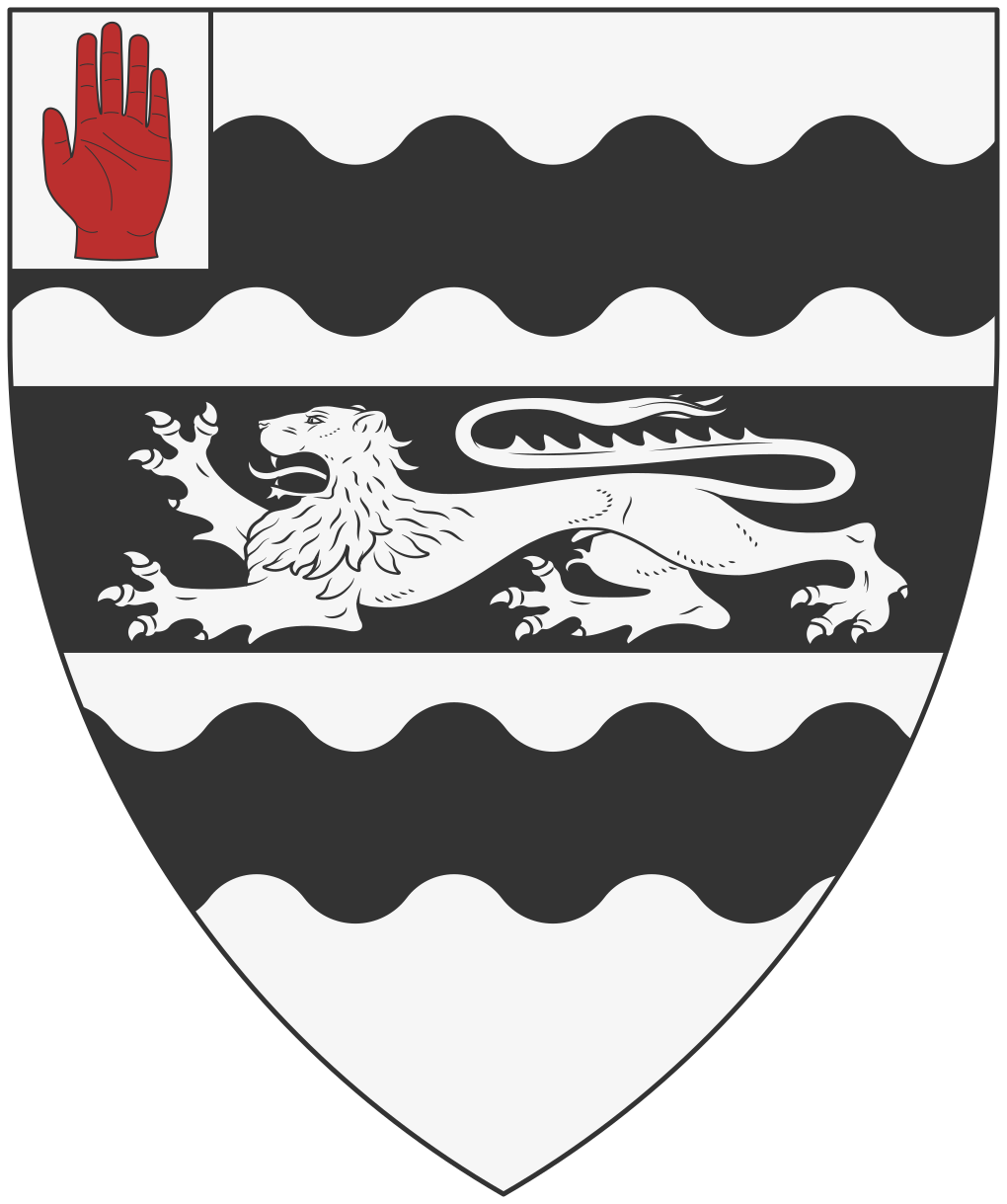
The coat of arms of Sir Jeremy Snowe, Bt, of Salesbury

The Snowe Baronetcy, of Salesbury in the County of Southampton, was a title in the Baronetage of England. It was created on 25 June 1679 for Jeremy Snowe. He was childless and the title became extinct on his death in 1702.

== Snowe baronets, of Salesbury (1679) ==
- Sir Jeremy Snowe, 1st Baronet (c. 1629–1702)
