= Valckenburg baronets =

Extinct baronetcy in the Baronetage of England

The Valckenburg Baronetcy, of Middleing in the County of York, was a title in the Baronetage of England. It was created on 20 July 1642 for Matthew Valckenburg. The title became extinct upon the death of the second Baronet in 1679.

== Valckenburg baronets, of Middleing (1642) ==
- Sir Matthew Valckenburg, 1st Baronet (died 1644)
- Sir John Anthony van Valckenburg, 2nd Baronet (died 1679)
