= Wilde baronets =

Extinct baronetcy in the Baronetage of England

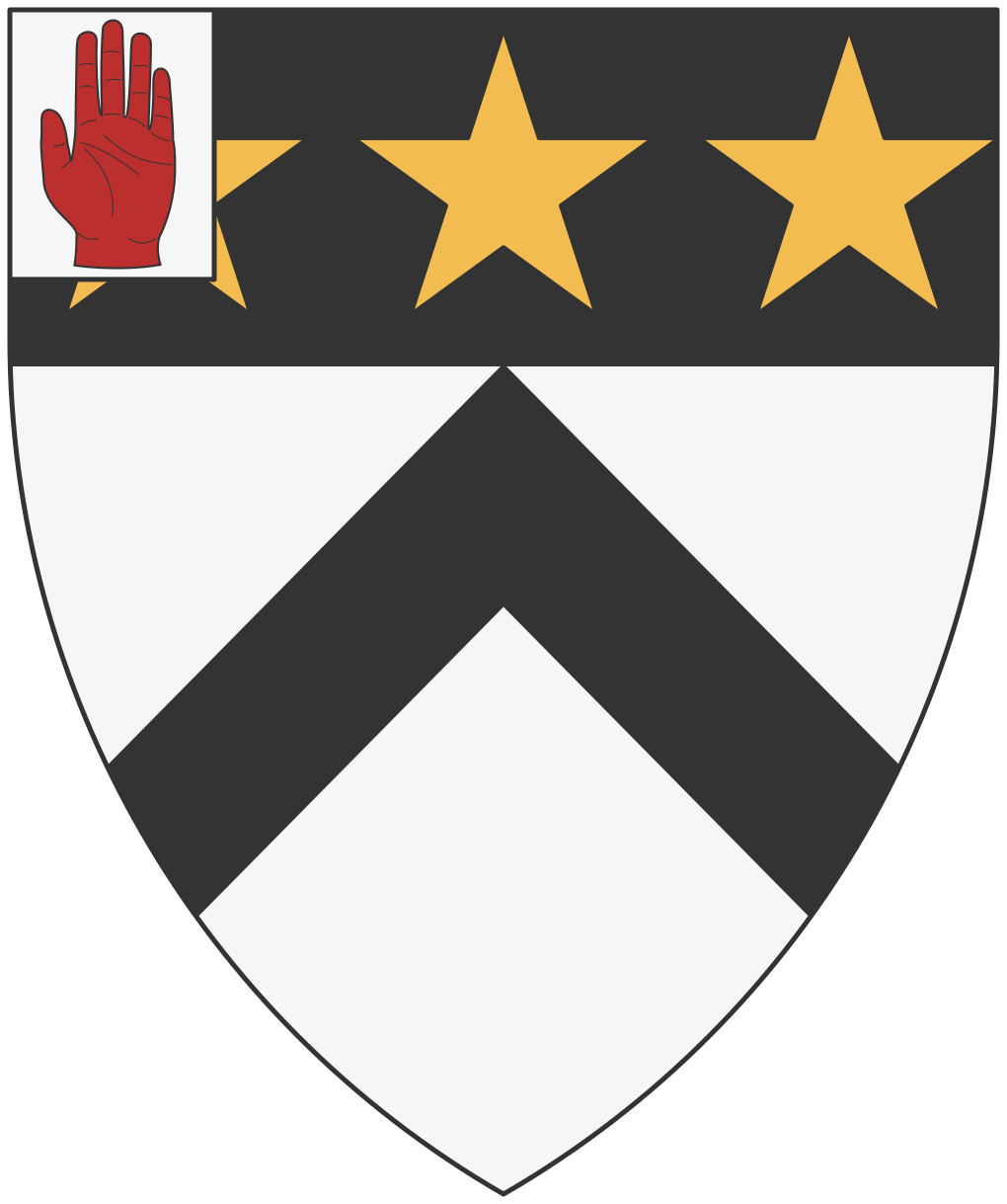
Arms of Wilde of London

The Wilde Baronetcy, of London, was a title in the Baronetage of England. It was created on 13 September 1660 for William Wilde, Member of Parliament for the City of London. The title became extinct on the death of the second Baronet in 1721.

== Wilde baronets, of London (1660) ==
- Sir William Wilde, 1st Baronet (c. 1611–1679
- Sir Felix Wilde, 2nd Baronet (c. 1654–1721)
