= Enyon baronets =

Extinct baronetcy in the Baronetage of England

The Enyon Baronetcy, of Flowrie in the County of Northampton, was a title in the Baronetage of England. It was created on 9 April 1642 for James Enyon, a Royalist soldier. He was killed in a duel with Sir Nicholas Crispe, Bt, at Royalist army headquarters in Gloucestershire already the same year. Enyon had no sons and the title died with him.

== Enyon baronets, of Flowrie (1642) ==
- Sir James Enyon, 1st Baronet (c. 1587–1642)
