= Stoughton baronets =

Extinct baronetcy in the Baronetage of England

The Stoughton Baronetcy, of Stoughton in the County of Surrey, was a title in the Baronetage of England. It was created on 29 January 1661 for Nicholas Stoughton. The title became extinct on the death of the second Baronet in 1692.

In January 1696, the House of Commons was asked to approve the sale of the Stoughton estates, to pay off debts and provide for the late Sir Nicholas Stoughton's daughters.

== Stoughton baronets, of Stoughton (1661) ==
Escutcheon of the Stoughton baronets

- Sir Nicholas Stoughton, 1st Baronet (1635–1686)
- Sir Laurence Stoughton, 2nd Baronet (1668–1692)
