= Neale baronets =

Extinct baronetcy in the Baronetage of England

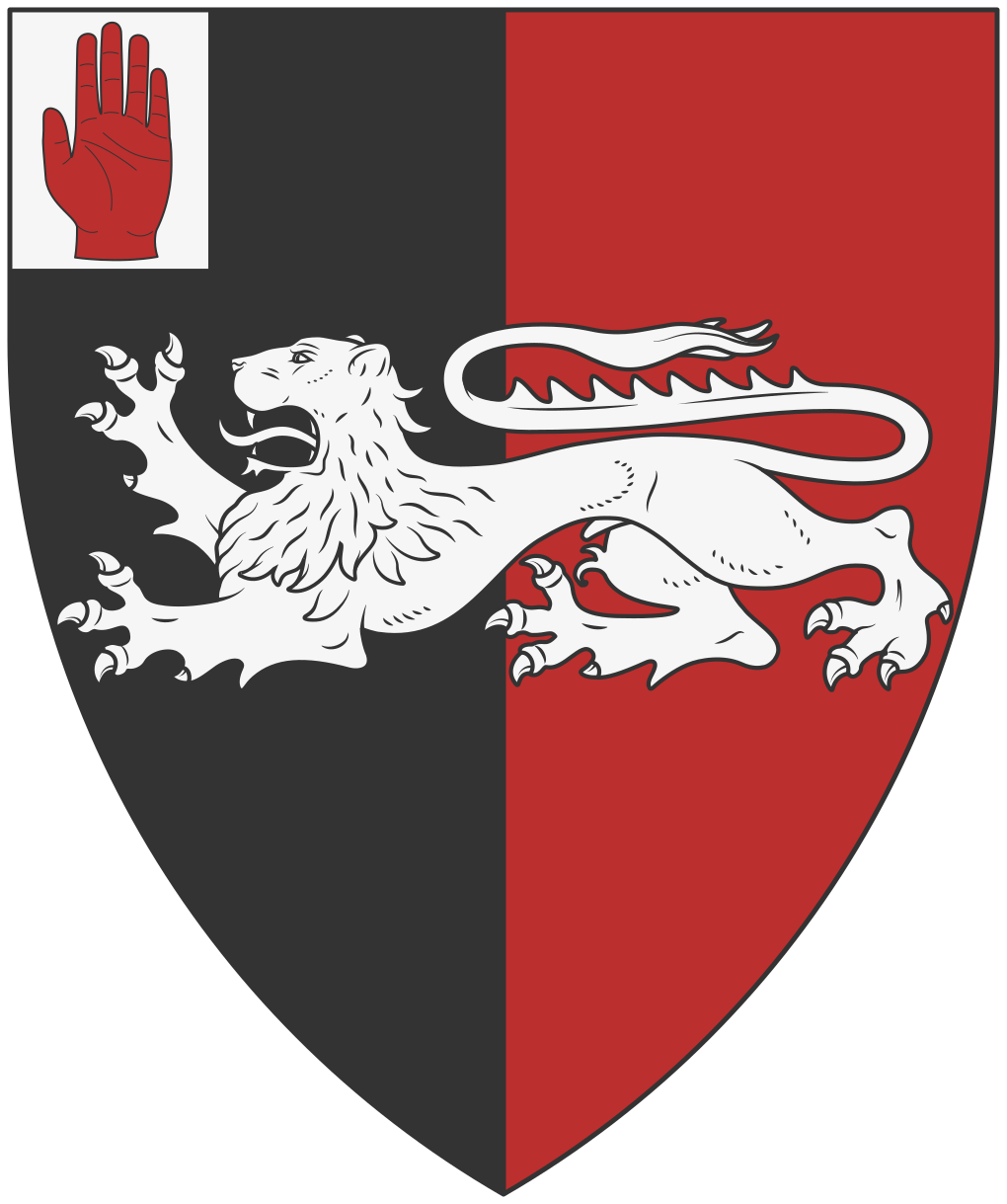
The coat of arms of Neale of Wollaston, Baronets.

The Neale Baronetcy, of Wollaston in the County of Northampton, was a title in the Baronetage of England. It was created on 26 February 1646 for William Neale, a Royalist soldier. The title became extinct on his death in 1691.

== Neale baronets, of Wollaston (1646) ==
- Sir William Neale, 1st Baronet (died 1691)
