= Cambell baronets =

Extinct baronetcy in the Baronetage of England

There have been two baronetcies created for members of the Cambell family, both in the Baronetage of England. Both creations are extinct.

The Cambell Baronetcy, of Woodford in the County of Essex, was created in the Baronetage of England on 9 April 1661 for John Cambell. The title became extinct on his death in 1661.

The Cambell Baronetcy, of Clay Hall in the County of Essex, was created in the Baronetage of England on 12 February 1664 for Thomas Cambell. He was the uncle of the first Baronet of the 1661 creation and the grandson of Sir Thomas Cambell, Lord Mayor of London from 1609 to 1610. The title became extinct on the death of his younger son, the third Baronet, in 1699.

== Cambell baronets, of Woodford (1661) ==
- Sir John Cambell, 1st Baronet (died 1662)

== Cambell baronets, of Clay Hall (1664) ==
- Sir Thomas Cambell, 1st Baronet (c. 1620–1665)
- Sir Thomas Cambell, 2nd Baronet (c. 1662–1668)
- Sir Henry Cambell, 3rd Baronet (1663–1699)
