= Stych baronets =

Extinct baronetcy in the Baronetage of England

The Stych Baronetcy, of Newbury in the County of Essex, was a title in the Baronetage of England. It was created on 8 October 1687 for William Stych. The title became extinct on the death of the second Baronet in 1725.

== Stych baronets, of Newbury (1687) ==
Escutcheon of the Stych baronets of Newbury

- Sir William Stych, 1st Baronet (died 1697)
- Sir Richard Stych, 2nd Baronet (died 1725)
