= Fortescue baronets =

Extinct baronetcy in the Baronetage of England

There have been three baronetcies created for persons with the surname Fortescue, one in the Baronetage of Nova Scotia and two in the Baronetage of England. Two of the creations are extinct while the other is dormant.

The Fortescue Baronetcy, of Salden in the County of Buckingham, was created in the Baronetage of Nova Scotia on 17 February 1636 for John Fortescue. The title became dormant on the death of the fourth Baronet in 1729.

The Fortescue Baronetcy, of Fallapit (alias Fallopit/Vallopit) in the County of Devon, in the parish of East Allington, was created in the Baronetage of England on 31 March 1664 for Edmund Fortescue, subsequently Member of Parliament for Plympton Erle. The title became extinct on the death of his son the second Baronet in 1683.

The Fortescue Baronetcy, of Woodleigh in the County of Devon, was created in the Baronetage of England on 29 January 1667 for Peter Fortescue (1620-1685) of Wood in the parish of Woodleigh, 3rd son of Francis Fortescue (d.circa 1649) of Preston, Devon, descended from John Fortescue (d.1479) of Wympstone in the parish of Modbury, Devon, MP for Totnes, Tavistock and Plympton. The title became extinct on his death in 1685.

== Fortescue baronets, of Salden (1636) ==
Escutcheon of the Fortescue baronets of Salden

- Sir John Fortescue, 1st Baronet (1592–1656)
- Sir John Fortescue, 2nd Baronet (1614–1683)
- Sir John Fortescue, 3rd Baronet (1644–1717)
- Sir Francis Fortescue, 4th Baronet (c. 1662–1729)

== Fortescue baronets, of Fallapit (1664) ==
Escutcheon of the Fortescue baronets of Fallapit

- Sir Edmund Fortescue, 1st Baronet (1642–1666)
- Sir Sandys Fortescue, 2nd Baronet (1661–1683)

== Fortescue baronets, of Woodleigh (1667) ==
- Sir Peter Fortescue, 1st Baronet (c. 1620–1685)
