= Osbaldeston baronets =

Title in the Baronetage of England

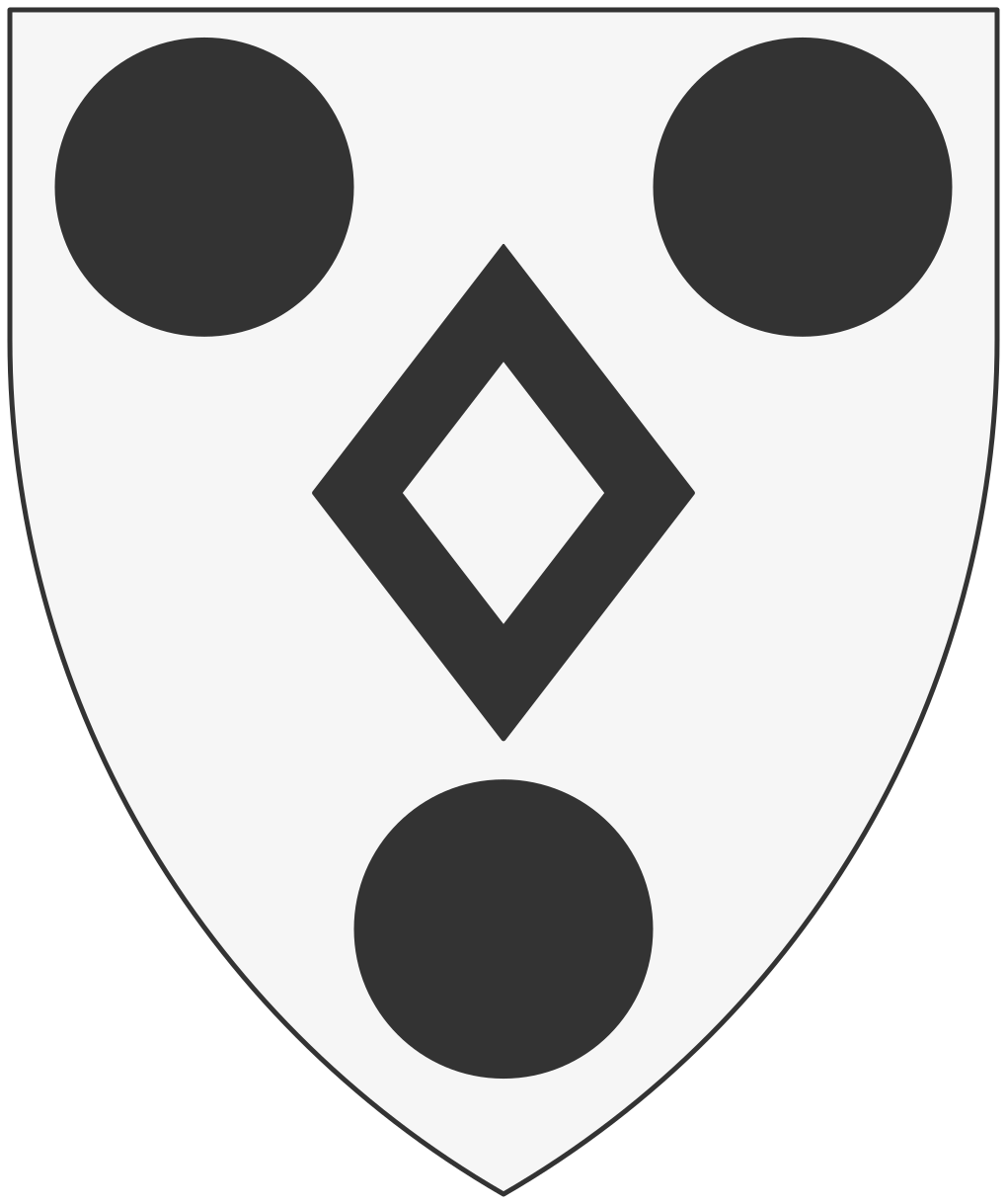
Arms of Osbaldeston of Chadlington

The Osbaldeston Baronetcy, of Chadlington in the County of Oxford, was a title in the Baronetage of England. It was created on 25 June 1664 for Littleton Osbaldeston, subsequently member of parliament for Woodstock. The title became extinct on the death of the fifth Baronet in 1749.

== Osbaldeston baronets, of Chadlington (1664) ==
- Sir Littleton Osbaldeston, 1st Baronet (died 1691)
- Sir Lacy Osbaldeston, 2nd Baronet (c. 1659–c. 1699)
- Sir Richard Osbaldeston, 3rd Baronet (1684–c. 1701)
- Sir William Osbaldeston, 4th Baronet (c. 1687–c. 1739)
- Sir Charles Osbaldeston, 5th Baronet (c. 1690–1749)
