= Colbrand baronets =

Extinct baronetcy in the Baronetage of England

The Colbrand Baronetcy, of Boreham in the County of Sussex, was a title in the Baronetage of England. It was created on 21 December 1621 for John Colbrand. The title became extinct on the death of the fifth Baronet in 1709.

== Colbrand baronets, of Boreham (1621) ==
- Sir John Colbrand, 1st Baronet (died 1627)
- Sir James Colbrand, 2nd Baronet (died c. 1640)
- Sir Richard Colbrand, 3rd Baronet (died 1664)
- Sir Charles Colbrand, 4th Baronet (died 1667)
- Sir Robert Colbrand, 5th Baronet (died 1709)
