= Plomer baronets =

Extinct baronetcy in the Baronetage of England

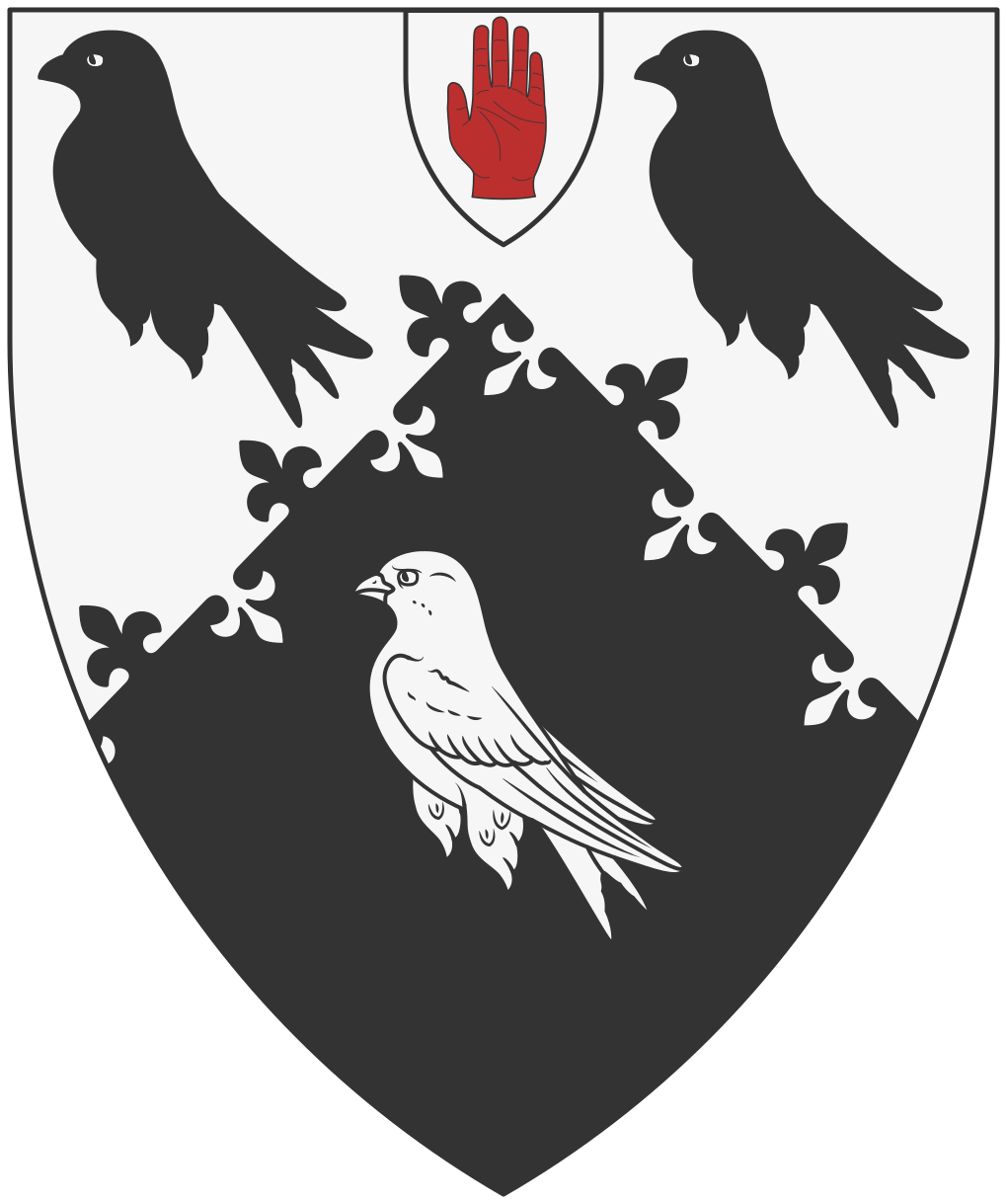
The coat of arms of the Plomer baronets.

The Plomer Baronetcy, of the Inner Temple, was a title in the Baronetage of England. It was created on 4 January 1661 for Walter Plomer. The title became extinct on his death in 1697. John Plomer, uncle of the first Baronet, was the ancestor of Walter Plumer and Richard Plumer, both MPs, and of their brother William Plumer and the latter's son William Plumer, both MPs for Hertfordshire.

== Plomer baronets, of the Inner Temple (1661) ==
- Sir Walter Plomer, 1st Baronet (c. 1621–1697)
