= Mottet baronets =

Extinct baronetcy in the Baronetage of England

The Mottet Baronetcy, of Liège, was a title in the Baronetage of England. It was created on 16 November 1660 for Giles Mottet, of Liège in Flanders. However, nothing further is known of him or any possible descendants.

== Mottet baronets, of Liège (1660) ==
- Sir Giles Mottet, 1st Baronet
