= Jason baronets =

Extinct baronetcy in the Baronetage of England

The Jason Baronetcy, of Broad Somerford in the County of Wiltshire, was a title in the Baronetage of England. It was created on 5 September 1661 for Robert Jason. The title became extinct on the death of the sixth Baronet in 1738.

== Jason baronets, of Broad Somerford (1661) ==
Escutcheon of the Jason baronets of Broad Somerford

- Sir Robert Jason, 1st Baronet (died c. 1675)
- Sir Robert Jason, 2nd Baronet (1640 – c. 1687)
- Sir George Jason, 3rd Baronet (died c. 1697)
- Sir Robert Jason, 4th Baronet (died c. 1723)
- Sir Warren Jason, 5th Baronet (c. 1705 – 1728)
- Sir Robert Jason, 6th Baronet (c. 1708 – 1738)
