= Wentworth baronets =

Set index for Wentworth baronets

There have been five baronetcies created for persons with the surname Wentworth, four in the Baronetage of England and one in the Baronetage of Great Britain. All creations are extinct.

- Wentworth baronets of Wentworth Woodhouse (1611): see Earl of Strafford
- Wentworth baronets of Gosfield (1611): see Sir John Wentworth, 1st Baronet, of Gosfield (c. 1583–1631)
- Wentworth baronets of West Bretton (1664)
- Wentworth baronets of North Elmsal (1692)
- Wentworth baronets of Parlut (1795)
