= List of baronetcies conferred upon British expatriates and non-British nationals =

This is a list of baronetcies conferred upon British expatriates and non-British nationals.

== America ==
All three baronetcies were conferred upon expatriates:

- Sir William Johnson, 1st Baronet, of New York in North America (1755), extant
- Sir Egerton Leigh, 1st Baronet, of the Province of South Carolina, America (1773), dormant
- Sir Robert Eden, 1st Baronet, of the Province of Maryland, America (1776), extant

== Australia ==
All were created before Australian federation in 1901. The Clarke baronetcy is the sole baronetcy in Australia conferred upon an Australian-born (Tasmanian-born) individual.

South Australia

- Sir Samuel Way, 1st Baronet, of Montefiore, in South Australia (1899), extinct 1916

Victoria

- Sir William Clarke, 1st Baronet, of Rupertswood, in the Colony of Victoria (1882), extant

New South Wales

- Sir Daniel Cooper, 1st Baronet, of Woollahra, in New South Wales (1863), extant
- Sir Charles Nicholson, 1st Baronet, of Luddenham, in New South Wales (1859), extinct 1986

== The Bahamas ==
- Sir Harry Oakes, 1st Baronet, of Nassau, in the Bahama Islands (1939), extant. Harry Oakes was an American who became a British subject.

== Barbados ==
- Sir John Alleyne, 1st Baronet, of Four Hills, in Barbados (1769), extant. Born in Barbados.

== Canada ==
- Sir Thomas Temple, 1st Baronet, of Nova Scotia, in the Colony of Nova Scotia (1662), extinct 1674
- Sir George Arthur, 1st Baronet, of Upper Canada, in the United Province of Canada (1841), extant
- Sir John Beverley Robinson, 1st Baronet, of Toronto, in the United Province of Canada (1854), dormant
- Sir Allan Napier MacNab, 1st Baronet, of Dundurn Castle, in the United Province of Canada (1858), extinct 1862
- Sir Samuel Cunard, 1st Baronet, of Bush Hill, Nova Scotia, in the United Province of Canada (1859), extinct 1989
- Sir John Rose, 1st Baronet, of Montreal, in the Dominion of Canada (1872), extant
- Sir Charles Tupper, 1st Baronet, of Armdale, Nova Scotia, in the Dominion of Canada (1888), extant
- Sir Edward Seaborne Clouston, 1st Baronet, of Montreal, in the Dominion of Canada (1908), extinct 1912
- Sir Joseph Wesley Flavelle, 1st Baronet, of Toronto, in the Dominion of Canada (1917), extinct 1985
- Sir James Hamet Dunn, 1st Baronet, of Bathurst, New Brunswick, in the Dominion of Canada (1921), extinct 1976

== India ==
- Sir Jamsetjee Jejeebhoy, 1st Baronet, of Bombay (1857), extant
- Sir Dinshaw Maneckji Petit, 1st Baronet, of Petit Hall, on the Island of Bombay (1890), extant
- Sir Jehangir Cowasji Jehangir Readymoney, 1st Baronet, of Bombay (1908), extant
- Sir Currimbhoy Ebrahim, 1st Baronet, of Pabaney Villa, of Bombay (1910), extant
- Sir Sassoon Jacob Hai David, 1st Baronet, of Bombay (1911), extinct 1964
- Sir Chinubhai Madhowlal Ranchhodlal, 1st Baronet, of Shahpur, in Ahmedabad (1913), extant
- Sir Albert Abdullah David Sassoon, 1st Baronet, of Kensington Gore (1890), extinct 1939
- Sir Jacob Sassoon, 1st Baronet, of Bombay (1909), extinct 1961

== Netherlands ==
- Sir Willem Boreel, 1st Baronet, of Amsterdam (1645) - the 8th baronet also became Jonkheer in the Dutch nobility, extant
- Sir Joseph van Colster, 1st Baronet, of Amsterdam (1645), extinct 1665
- Sir Walter de Raedt, 1st Baronet, of The Hague (1660), extinct
- Sir Cornelis Tromp, 1st Baronet, Lieutenant-Admiral of Holland (1675) - also created Ridder in the Dutch nobility, extinct 1691
- Sir Richard Tulp, 1st Baronet, of Amsterdam (1675), extinct 1690
- Sir Gelebrand Sas van Bosch, 1st Baronet, of Rotterdam (1680), extinct 1720
- Sir Cornelis Speelman, 1st Baronet, of Brabant (1686) - Sir Cornelis Jacob Speelman, 3rd Baronet also became Jonkheer in the Dutch nobility, extinct 2005
- Sir John Peter van den Brande, 1st Baronet, of Cleverskerke (1699), extinct 1750

== New Zealand ==
The Porritt baronetcy is the sole baronetcy in New Zealand conferred upon a New Zealand-born individual.

- Sir Charles Clifford, 1st Baronet, of Flaxbourne, in New Zealand (1887), extinct 2025
- Sir Joseph Ward, 1st Baronet, of Wellington, in New Zealand (1911), extant
- Sir Arthur Porritt, 1st Baronet, of Hampstead in the County of London (1963), extant (further made a life peer in 1973 as Baron Porritt, of Wanganui in New Zealand and of Hampstead in Greater London.

== South Africa ==
Cape Colony

- Sir Andries Stockenström, 1st Baronet, of Cape of Good Hope (1840), extinct 1957
- Sir Julius Wernher, 1st Baronet, of Luton Hoo Park, in the Parish of Luton and County of Bedford (1905), extinct 1973
- Sir Frederic Samuel Philipson-Stow, 1st Baronet, of Cape Town, in the Colony of the Cape of Good Hope, and of Blackdown House, in the parish of Lodsworth, in the county of Sussex (1907), extant
- Sir Joseph Robinson, 1st Baronet, of Hawthornden, in the Cape Province, and Dudley House, in Westminster (1908), extant

Union of South Africa

- Sir David Graaff, 1st Baronet, of Cape Town, in the Cape of Good Hope Province, of the Union of South Africa (1911), extant
- Sir Leander Starr Jameson, 1st Baronet, of Down Street, in London (1911), extinct 1917
- Sir George Albu, 1st Baronet, of Johannesburg (1912), extant
- Sir Lionel Phillips, 1st Baronet, of Tylney Hall (1912), extinct 2026
- Sir Sothern Holland, 1st Baronet, of Westwell Manor, in the County of Oxford (1917), extinct 1997.
- Sir Abe Bailey, 1st Baronet, of South Africa (1919), extant
- Sir Bernard Oppenheimer, 1st Baronet, of Stoke Poges, in the County of Buckingham (1921), extinct 2020
- Sir Otto Beit, 1st Baronet, of Tewin Water (1924), extinct 1994
- Sir Lewis Richardson, 1st Baronet, of Yellow Woods, in the Cape of Good Hope Province, in South Africa (1924), extant

== Sweden ==
- Sir John Frederick von Friesendorf, 1st Baronet, of Hirdech (1661) - also created Reichsfreiherr in the German nobility, his sons created Friherrar in the nobility of Sweden, extant
- Sir Erik Ohlson, 1st Baronet, of Scarborough, in the North Riding of the County of York (1920), extinct 2026.

== See also ==
- Lists of baronetcies
- British Honours System
