= Bertil =

- Gender: male

Bertil is a first name of Germanic origin most commonly found among Swedish men. The oldest recorded use is from the year 1396, but the name did not come into widespread use until the 19th century.

People called Bertil include:

- Carl Bertil Agnestig (1924–2019), Swedish music teacher and composer
- Bertil Ahlin (1927–2008), Swedish bantamweight boxer
- Bertil Albertsson (1921–2008), Swedish runner
- Bertil Almgren (1918–2011), Swedish archaeologist
- Bertil Almqvist (1902–1972), nicknamed Bertila and Trallgöken, Swedish author and illustrator
- Bertil Anderberg (1913–1991), Swedish film actor
- Bertil Andersson FAA FIC, third President of Nanyang Technological University (NTU)
- Bertil Antonsson (1921–2006), Swedish heavyweight wrestler
- Bertil Arvidson (1921–2004), Swedish diplomat
- Bertil Bäckvall (1923–2012), Swedish footballer and football manager
- Bertil W. Benson (1843–1907), Norwegian-born American politician
- Bertil Berg (1910–1989), Swedish water polo player who competed in the 1936 Summer Olympics
- Bertil Berthelsson (1902–1977), Swedish Navy vice admiral
- Bertil H. van Boer, American musicologist
- Bertil Boo (1914–1996), Swedish singer
- Bertil Bothén (1892–1966), Swedish sailor who competed in the 1912 Summer Olympics
- Bertil Carlsson (skier) (1903–1953), Swedish ski jumper
- Bertil Carlsson (weightlifter) (1901–1959), Swedish weightlifter
- Bertil R. Carlsson (1901–1959), Swedish weightlifter
- Bertil Elmstedt (born 1937), Swedish footballer
- Bertil Envall (1909–2011), Swedish Lutheran missionary, bishop emeritus of the Evangelical Lutheran Church in Malaysia
- Bertil Fastén (1900–1928), Swedish athlete
- Bertil Fiskesjö (1928–2019), Swedish politician, member of the Centre Party
- Bertil Fox (born 1951), British former IFBB professional bodybuilder and convicted murderer
- Bertil von Friesen (1901–1990), Swedish physician
- Bertil Gärtner (1924–2009), Swedish Lutheran bishop, and professor at Princeton Theological Seminary, United States
- Bertil Göransson (1919–2004), Swedish rowing coxswain who competed in the 1956 Summer Olympics
- Bertil Martinus Grov (born 1974), retired archer from Norway
- Bertil Gustafsson (born 1939), Swedish applied mathematician and numerical analyst
- Bertil Haase (1923–2014), Swedish pentathlete who competed at both Winter and Summer Olympics
- Prince Bertil, Duke of Halland (1912–1997), third son of King Gustaf VI Adolf and his first wife
- Bertil Hallin (born 1931), Swedish church musician and music teacher
- Bertil Hille (born 1940), professor in the Department of Physiology and Biophysics at the University of Washington
- Bertil Holmlund (1947–2025), Swedish economist, Professor of Economics at Uppsala University
- Bertil Hult (born 1941), Swedish businessman, founded the educational and language school company, EF Education First
- Bertil Jansson (1898–1981), Swedish athlete
- Bertil Palmar Johansen Johansen (born 1954), Norwegian contemporary composer and violinist
- Bertil Johansson (1935–2021), Swedish football striker and football manager
- Bertil Johansson (politician) (1930–2018), Swedish politician
- Bertil Johnsson (1915–2010), leading Swedish long and triple jumper
- Bertil Jonasson (1918–2011), Swedish politician
- Bertil Karlsson (1919–2012), Swedish athlete who competed at the 1952 Summer Olympics in Helsinki
- Bertil Kjellberg (born 1953), Swedish politician of the Moderate Party
- Bertil Larsson (born 1954), Swedish sport sailor
- Bertil Lindblad (1895–1965), Swedish astronomer
- Bertil Linde (1907–1990), Swedish ice hockey player who won a silver medal at the 1928 Winter Olympics
- Bertil Lintner (born 1953), Swedish journalist, author and strategic consultant and writer about Asia
- Bertil Lundman (1899–1993), Swedish anthropologist
- Bertil Malmberg (1889–1958), Swedish author, poet, and actor
- Bertil Mårtensson (1945–2018), Swedish author of science fiction, crime fiction and fantasy and also an academic philosopher
- Bertil Näslund (1933–2016), Swedish economist and emeritus professor
- Bertil Nilsson (born 1936), Swedish footballer
- Bertil Nordahl (1917–1998), Swedish football player and manager
- Bertil Nordenskjöld (1891–1975), Swedish Olympic footballer
- Bertil Nordenstam (born 1936), Swedish botanist and professor
- Bertil Nordqvist, Swedish ski-orienteering competitor
- Bertil Norman (born 1929), Swedish orienteering competitor
- Bertil Norström (1923–2012), Swedish actor
- Bertil Nyström (born 1935), Swedish Greco-Roman wrestler
- Bertil Ohlin (1899–1979), Swedish economist and politician
- Bertil Ohlson (1899–1970), Swedish decathlete
- Bertil Persson (alpine skier) (1914–1978), Swedish alpine skier
- Bertil Persson (bishop) (born 1941), professor in religion and church arts, former Presiding Bishop of the Apostolic Episcopal Church
- Bertil Persson (potter) (born 1940), Swedish Hagi ware potter based in Japan
- Bertil Rönnmark (1905–1967), Swedish rifle sports shooter who competed in the 1932 Summer Olympics and in the 1936 Summer Olympics
- Bertil Roos (1943–2016), Swedish racing driver from Gothenburg
- Bertil Sandström (1887–1964), Swedish military officer and horse rider
- Bertil Schmüll (born 1946), Dutch engraver
- Bertil Söderberg (born 1947), Swedish handball player who competed in the 1972 Summer Olympics
- Bertil Stålhane, (1902–1992), Swedish chemist, technical researcher and author
- Bertil Stjernfelt (1917–2017), Swedish officer and military historian
- Bertil Ströberg (1932–2012), Swedish Air Force officer convicted of spying for Poland during the Cold War
- Bertil Sundberg (1907–1979), Sweden chess player
- Bertil Svensson, Swedish footballer
- Bertil Tallberg (1883–1963), Finnish sailor who competed in the 1912 Summer Olympics
- Bertil Tunje, Vice-Chairman of the World Scout Committee
- Bertil Uggla (1890–1945), Swedish track and field athlete, modern pentathlete and fencer
- Bertil af Ugglas (1934–1977), Party Secretary of the Swedish Moderate Party, member of the Swedish Riksdag
- Bertil von Wachenfeldt (1909–1995), Swedish sprinter who specialized in the 400 m distance
- Bertil Wedin (born 1940), Swedish secret service agent
- Bertil Werkström (1928–2010), Archbishop of Uppsala
- Bertil Zachrisson (1926–2023), Swedish politician

== See also ==
- Bert Hill
- Berti
- Bertiella (disambiguation)
- Bertillon
