= Friesen (surname) =

Friesen is a surname. Notable people with the surname include:

- Albert D. Friesen (born 1947), Canadian biotechnologist
- Alex Friesen (born 1991), Canadian ice hockey player
- Benno Friesen (1929–2021), Canadian administrator, professor and politician
- Bertil von Friesen (1901–1990), Swedish physician
- Brandon Friesen, American music producer, audio engineer, mixer and television producer
- Cameron Friesen, Canadian politician
- Curt Friesen (born 1955), American politician
- Curwin Friesen, Canadian businessman
- David Friesen (born 1942), American jazz bassist
- Dawna Friesen (born 1964), Canadian television journalist
- Don Friesen, American stand-up comedian
- Dustin Friesen (born 1983), Canadian-German ice hockey player
- Eira Friesen (1917–2008), Welsh-born Canadian community activist
- Eugene Friesen (born 1952), American cellist and composer
- Gayle Friesen (born 1960), Canadian author
- Gil Friesen (1937–2012), American music and film executive
- Gordon Friesen (1909–1996), American folk musician
- Henry Friesen (1934–2025), Canadian endocrinologist
- Jackie Friesen (born 1983), American ice hockey player
- Jean Friesen (born 1943), Canadian politician
- Jeff Friesen (born 1976), Canadian ice hockey player
- Jerry Friesen (born 1955), Canadian football linebacker
- Karl Friesen (born 1958), Canadian ice hockey player
- Kayla Friesen (born 1998), Canadian-American ice hockey player
- Marcia Friesen, Canadian engineering educator
- Marine Friesen (born 1988), Brazilian singer and songwriter
- Norm Friesen (born 1966), Canadian professor
- Otto von Friesen (1870–1942), Swedish linguist and runologist
- Patrick Friesen (born 1946), Canadian author
- Pete Friesen (born 1965), Canadian guitarist
- Richard von Friesen (1808–1884), German statesman
- Sten von Friesen (1907–1996), Swedish physicist
- Steve Friesen (born 1977), American golfer
- Stewart Friesen (born 1983), Canadian stock car racing driver

== See also ==
- von Friesen, German noble family
- Von Friesendorff, Swedish noble family
- Von Friesendorff baronets, English noble title
