= Poland–Sweden relations =

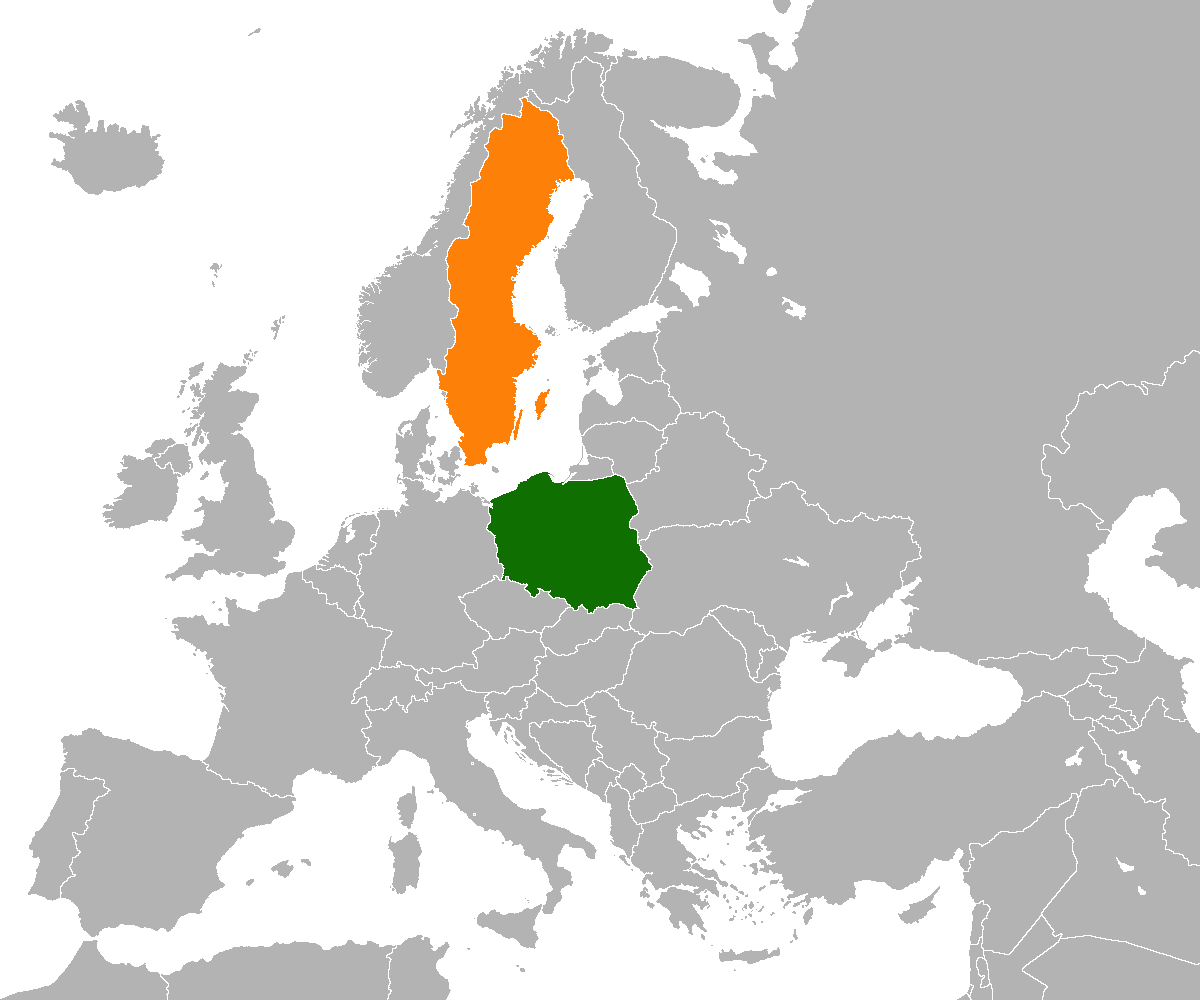
- Poland: Sweden

Diplomatic mission
- Embassy of Poland, Stockholm: Embassy of Sweden, Warsaw

Poland and Sweden maintain historical and bilateral relations. The countries are separated by the Baltic Sea and have had a very long historical contact and extensive history marked by periods of alliance and cooperation, as well as several conflicts.

Initially often allies since the Middle Ages, relations turned into an intense rivalry for dominance in the Baltic Sea region and Northern and Central Europe with a series of wars in the early modern period, with rather sporadic rapprochements between wars. After losing their positions as great powers, there was a more permanent rapprochement between the countries, and at the beginning of the 20th century, Poland and Sweden enjoyed a close relationship, which was interrupted by the Soviet and German invasion of Poland, which started World War II, however, cooperation continued despite the occupation of Poland and formal neutrality of Sweden. After the war, both re-established relations and Sweden has become the largest economic contributor for Poland among the Nordic countries.

Both Poland and Sweden are members of the EU, NATO, OECD, OSCE, Council of the Baltic Sea States, HELCOM, Council of Europe and the World Trade Organization. There are over 90,000 Poles in Sweden and resident from both countries visit each other frequently. Poland fully supported Sweden's application to join NATO, which resulted in membership on 7 March 2024.

== History ==
=== Early history ===
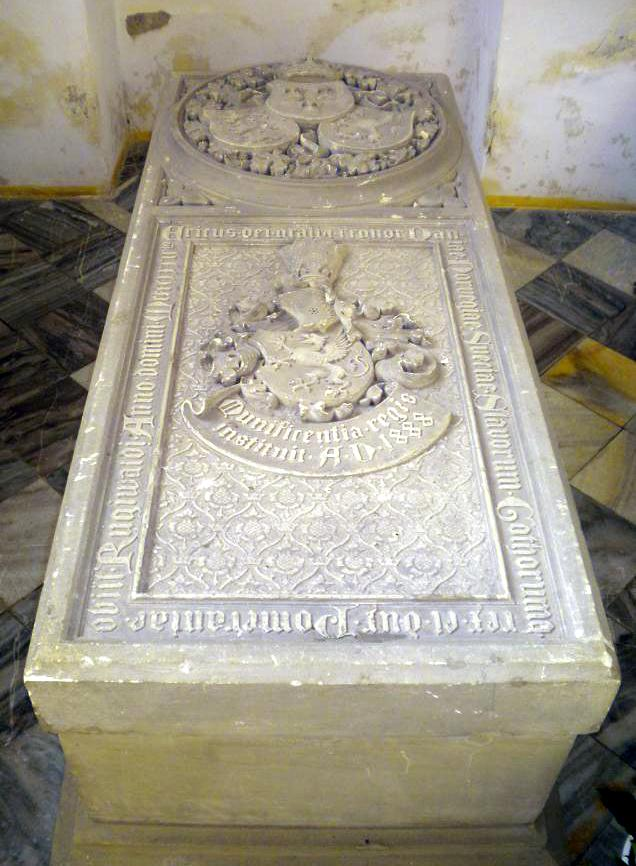
Tomb of King Eric XIII of Sweden in Darłowo, Poland

Both countries were founded in the 10th century with first historically attested rulers in the second half of the 10th century. Relations between the nations were soon established. After 1000, the local tradition of making earthenware in southern Sweden was discontinued, and was taken over by Slavic immigrants from Pomerania in Poland.

In the medieval period, Poland and Sweden entered into alliances several times, incl. in c. 985, 1315, 1419 and 1454. From 1396 to 1439, Eric of Pomerania of the House of Griffin was King of Sweden as Eric XIII, and his tomb is located in his birth town of Darłowo in Poland. In 1457, deposed King Charles VIII of Sweden was given refuge by Polish King Casimir IV Jagiellon, before he reclaimed the Swedish throne after his rival Christian I of Denmark was deposed from it in 1464.

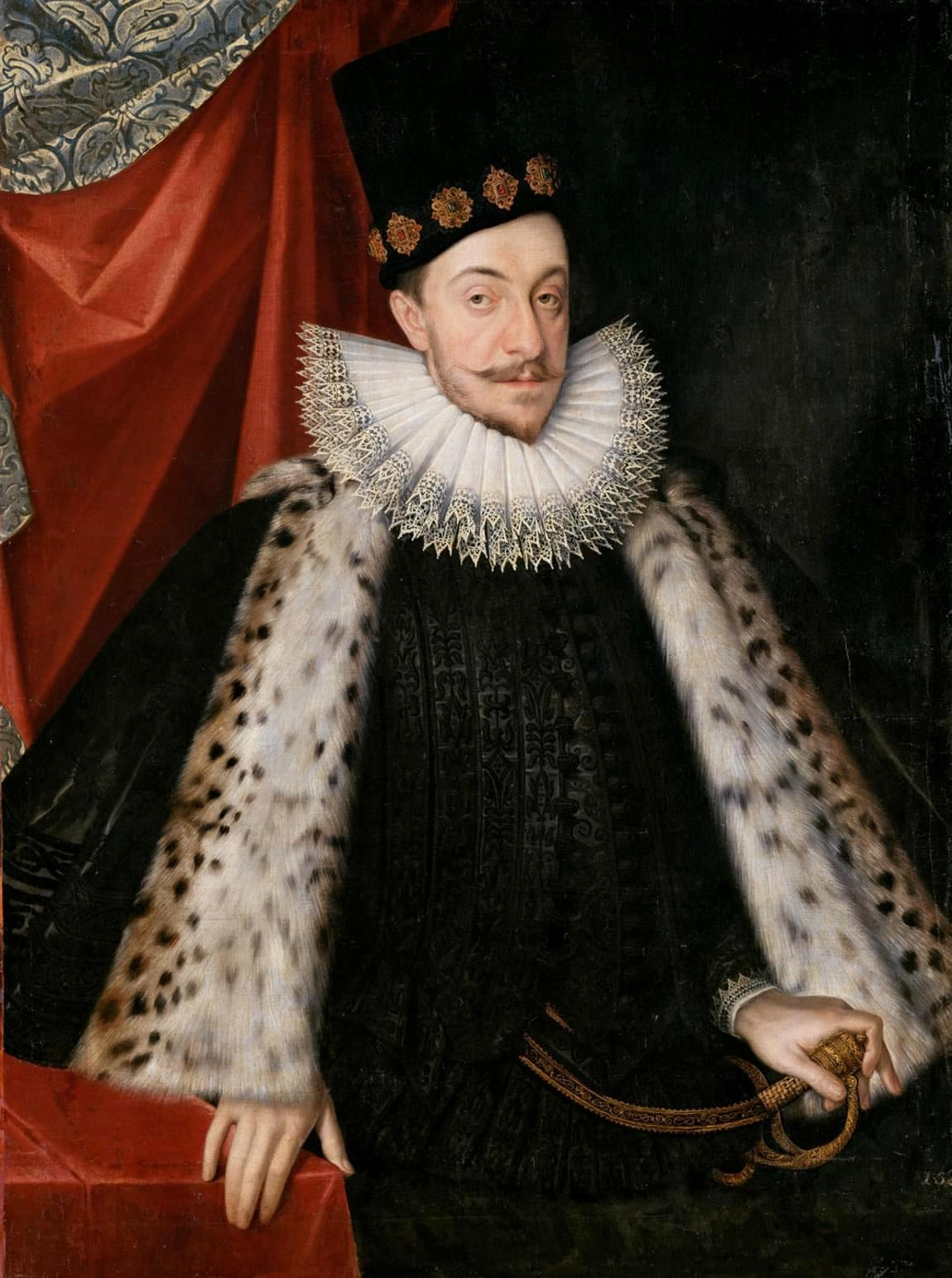
Poland and Sweden formed a personal union under the rule of King Sigismund III Vasa in 1592–1599

The Jagiellonian dynasty which ruled Poland from 1386 to 1596 was thought to have some Swedish ancestry and played a significant role in developing Poland into a major European power in the medieval days of Europe. One of Poland's most significant rulers, Sigismund III Vasa, was also partly Swedish through his father King John III of Sweden. Sigismund's mother was Polish Princess Catherine Jagiellon. Under the rule of Sigismund III both countries formed the Polish–Swedish union, which encompassed most of the Baltic region, and from 1561 to 1722, the two countries shared a common border in Livonia.

Poland and Sweden were enemies in the Northern Seven Years' War since 1563, however, following a rapprochement a Polish-Swedish alliance was formed in 1568. Poland helped conclude the peace between Denmark and Sweden at Szczecin ending the war in 1570.

In the 1570s, Poland and Sweden were in talks to form an alliance against expansionist Russia, however, the Swedish-controlled Duchy of Estonia (modern northern Estonia) with the city of Tallinn was also disputed by Poland, as a territory incorporated to Lithuania, thus the Polish–Lithuanian union, per the Treaty of Vilnius in 1561. Sweden refused to cede Tallinn to Poland, which offered financial compensation, and did not recognize the region's incorporation into Lithuania in 1561. The Swedes tried to persuade the cities of Polish Livonia, especially Riga, to break ties with Poland and recognize Swedish sovereignty, promising defense against a potential Russian attack, and even sparked an ultimately unsuccessful pro-Swedish revolt in Riga. Faced with failure, Sweden abandoned its plots against Poland and fought alongside Poland against Russia in the Livonian War, and relations worsened only in 1581.

=== 17th and 18th centuries ===
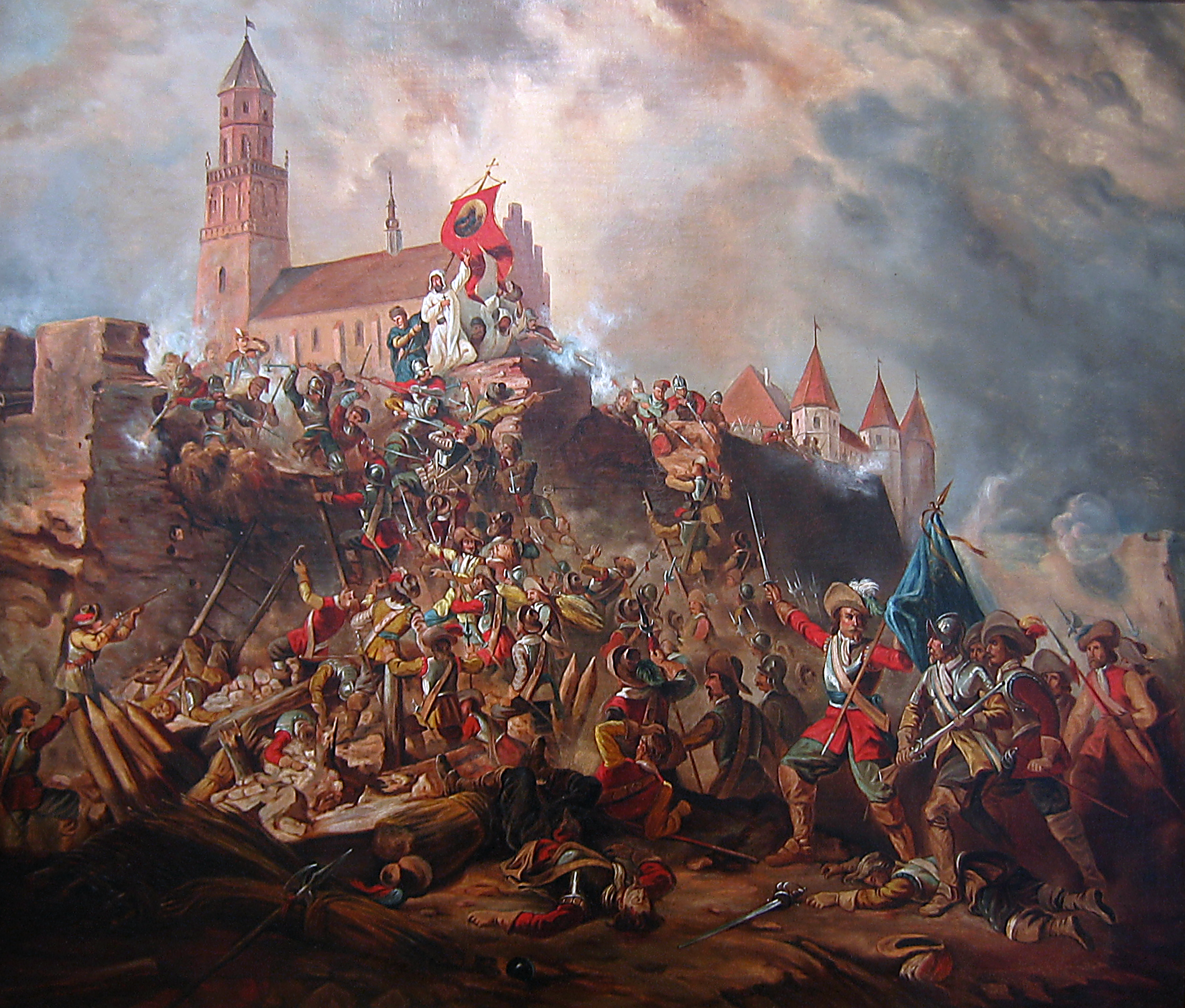
Siege of Jasna Góra (1655)

At the same time, both Poland, as part of the Polish–Lithuanian Commonwealth, and Imperial Sweden had ambitious plans to expand territorial gains and consolidate power, which led to many major conflicts between the two nations, challenging the power of each. Sweden invaded Poland several times, incl. in 1617, 1621, 1626, 1655 and 1701. The Swedish occupation of 1655–1660, known as the Swedish Deluge, had razed much of Poland after serious destructions by the Swedish invaders. It was one of the two most destructive invasions and occupations in Polish history (alongside the German-Soviet invasion and occupation in World War II). The population of Poland decreased by up to 40%, several hundred castles and villages were destroyed. Swedish troops plundered countless heritage sights and art collections, and many Polish works of art and culture are still housed in Swedish museums and institutions today, as is the library of astronomer Nicolaus Copernicus, robbed from Poland during the earlier Swedish invasions. The weakening of Poland had been contributed by the brutal Swedish invasion. The successful Polish defense of Jasna Góra against several times more numerous Swedish forces grew to become a symbol of resistance in Poland. During the celebrations of the 350th anniversary of the battle in 2005, Ambassador of Sweden in Poland Tomas Bertelman apologized "for the suffering and destruction that the Swedish-led forces had caused in Poland". The return of military commander Stefan Czarniecki from Denmark to Poland to repel the Swedish occupiers is mentioned in the national anthem of Poland.

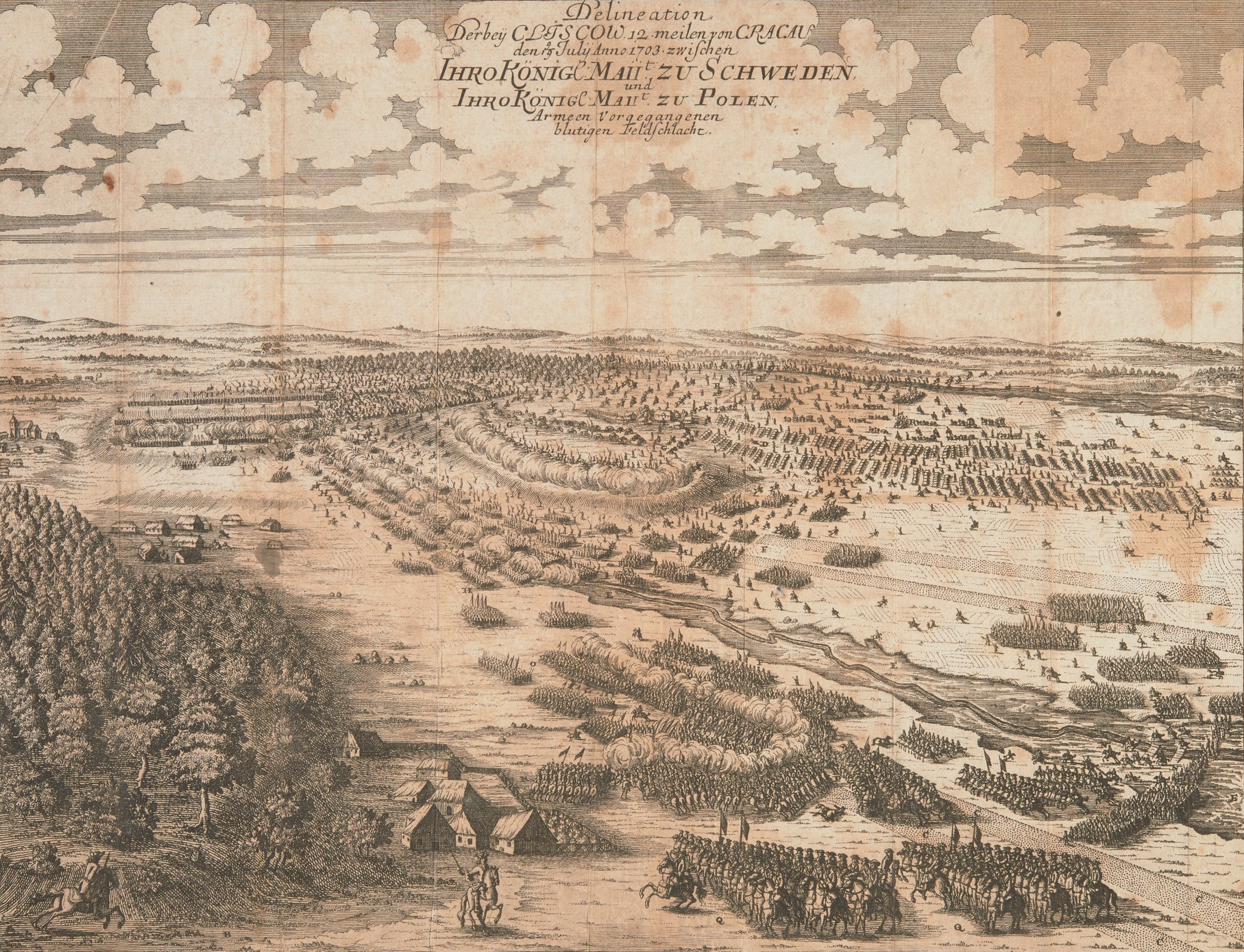
Battle of Kliszów (1702)

The rapprochement between the countries took place in the 1660s. Sweden saw Poland as a natural ally and tried to break its international isolation with Poland's help, but the developed distrust hindered the formation of a large Franco-Polish-Swedish alliance. In the 1670s, the Swedes again attempted to forge such a large alliance against Brandenburg, and a Polish-Swedish alliance treaty was signed in Gdańsk in 1677.

In the 18th century, the partitions of Poland awoke Swedish fear of suffering a similar fate at the hands of Russia, but after the Russo-Swedish war ended in 1790, successful Swedish diplomatic missions prevented such an outcome, however, Sweden, similarly to Poland, lost large territories in the east to Russia in 1721 and 1809.

Sweden was the main destination for many immigrants from partitioned Poland. In 1797, Polish national hero Tadeusz Kościuszko stayed in Stockholm and Gothenburg.

=== 19th century ===
During the Polish January Uprising of 1863–1864, various Swedish newspapers sympathized with the Poles, with some stating that Russia was a common enemy of Sweden and Poland. On March 2, 1863, a pro-Polish rally was organized in Stockholm, attended by a number of Swedish parliamentarians, and funds were collected for arms for the Polish insurgents. Over 30 committees of support for Poland were formed throughout Sweden. In February and March 1863 the Polish case was discussed in the Swedish Parliament, with many voices of support for the Poles but also some sceptical voices. No significant decisions were made. The Swedish government took a restrained stance, suggesting that Sweden could become more involved in helping Poland only alongside Western European powers such as Britain or France, therefore awaiting their decisions, whereas Swedish King Charles XV strongly supported Swedish involvement in the fight on the Polish side. In March 1863 meetings between Polish envoys and Swedish parliamentarians took place in Sweden, but despite a very ceremonial reception, the Poles did not gain stronger support from the Swedish authorities. In the spring of 1863, armed Polish volunteers from Western Europe assisted by foreigners of various nationalities attempted to reach partitioned Poland by sea via Sweden. This Lapinski expedition stopped on the island of Öland and in Malmö, where it was met with sympathy of the local Swedes. The Swedish authorities, fearing Russia, were forced to put the Poles under arrest, so the Poles departed in May 1863 to attempt a naval landing near Klaipėda. In the following months the Swedes continued to collect money to help the Polish insurgents.

A notable advocate of close Polish-Swedish cooperation and alliance was Wawrzyniec Benzelstjerna Engeström, Polish poet and activist of partial Swedish ancestry.

=== 20th century ===
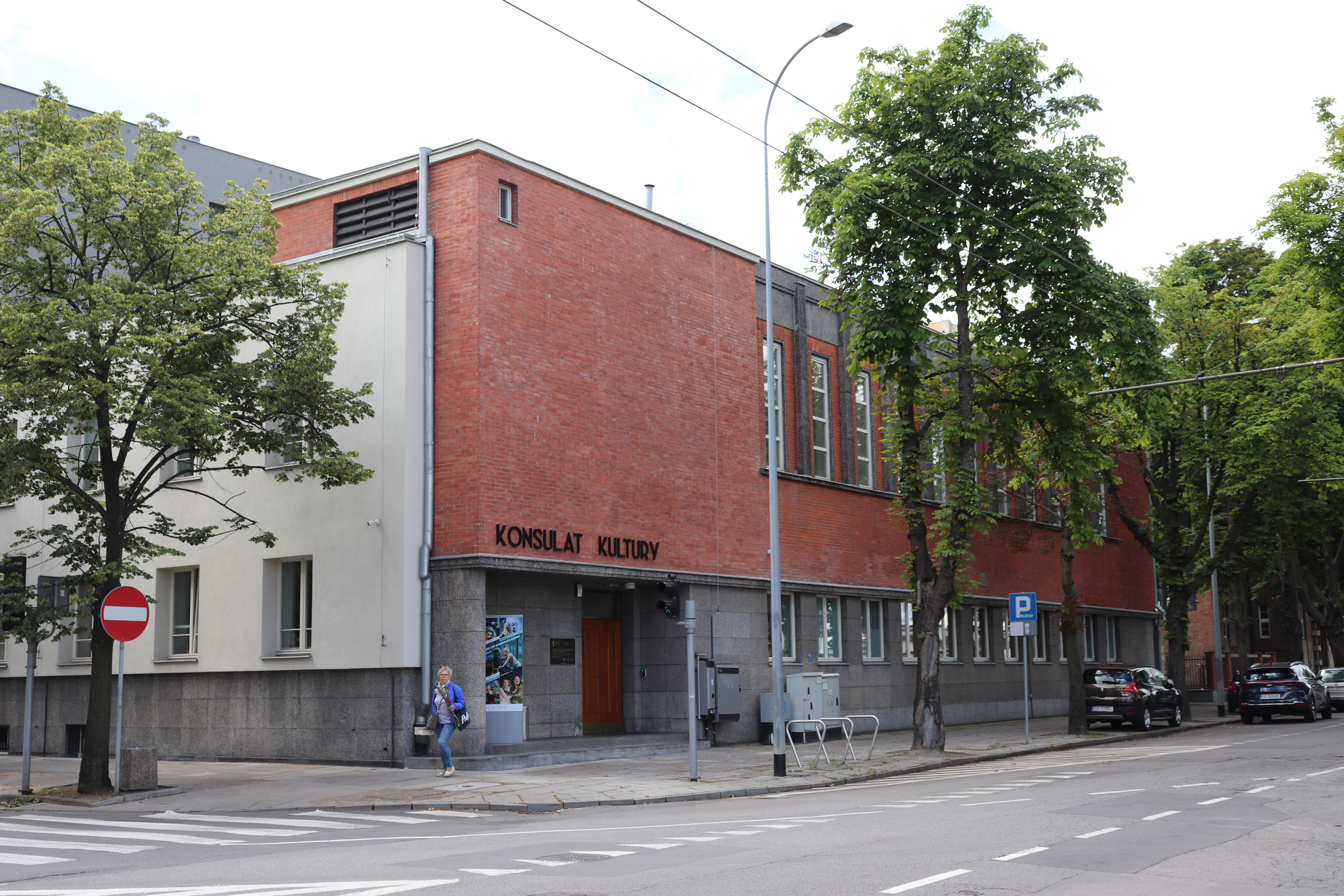
Former Swedish Sailor's House in Gdynia, focal point of Polish-Swedish cooperation during World War II

During both World War I and World War II, the Polish community in Sweden were very supportive of independent Poland without being controlled by both the Germans and the Russians. After Poland regained independence following World War I, a ferry connection between Gdynia and Trelleborg was established and trade between Poland and Sweden was intense. Poland imported ore, while Sweden imported coal. In 1936, the Swedish Sailor's House was opened in Gdynia, with a hotel for Swedish sailors, a Swedish consulate and chapel.

During World War II, Sweden refused the idea of forming a Polish air squadron on its territory to assist Finland against the Soviet invasion for fear of a German and Soviet reaction, and claiming Swedish neutrality. Several members of Home Army used Sweden to facilitate and fund the Polish resistance. The Polish resistance movement, in cooperation with Polish outposts in Sweden, organized escapes of Poles from German-occupied Poland to Sweden by sea. The Polish and Swedish intelligence services cooperated with each other, as well as the Polish resistance and the Consulate of Sweden in Gdynia. The Polish resistance also facilitated escapes to Sweden by Jews rescued from the Holocaust and British, French and Russian prisoners of war escaping from German POW camps and forced labour camps. Swedish sailors generally helped in escapes, but there were occasional exceptions to this rule. In addition, secret correspondence between the Polish resistance in the occupied country and the Polish government-in-exile was smuggled through Sweden, and a portion of the Polish gold reserve, the part held in Lithuanian-annexed Wilno, was secretly evacuated to Sweden by the Poles with the help of the Japanese (see Japan–Poland relations).

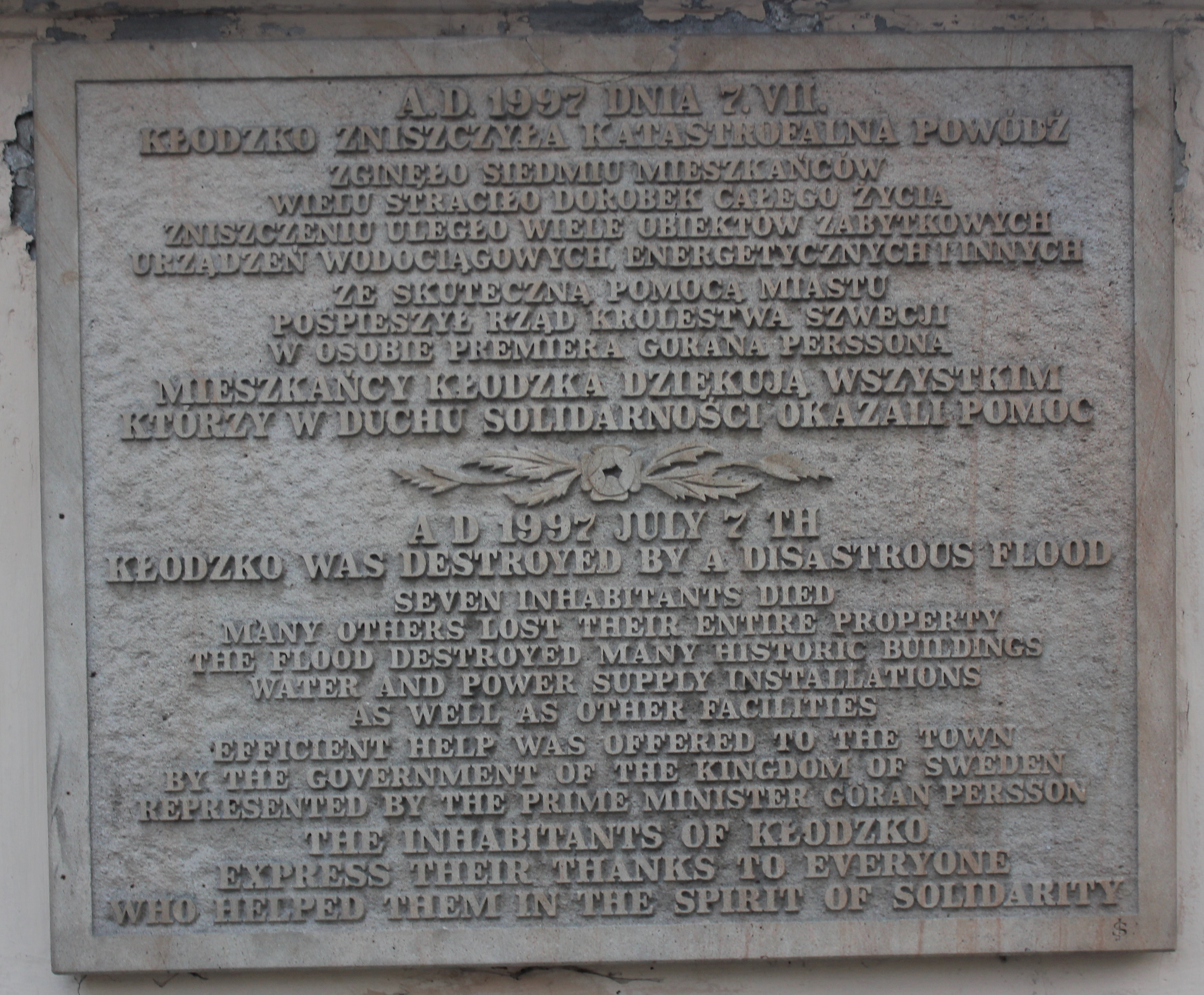
Plaque commemorating Swedish aid following the 1997 flood in Kłodzko

In 1948, the Polish Veterans Association in Gothenburg was established by former Polish prisoners of Nazi German concentration camps, and in 1962 it was transformed into the Polish Cultural Association in Gothenburg. In 1973, the Polish Institute in Stockholm was founded. In 1975, a memorial to the victims of the Katyn massacre was unveiled in Stockholm by the local Polish community.

=== 21st century ===
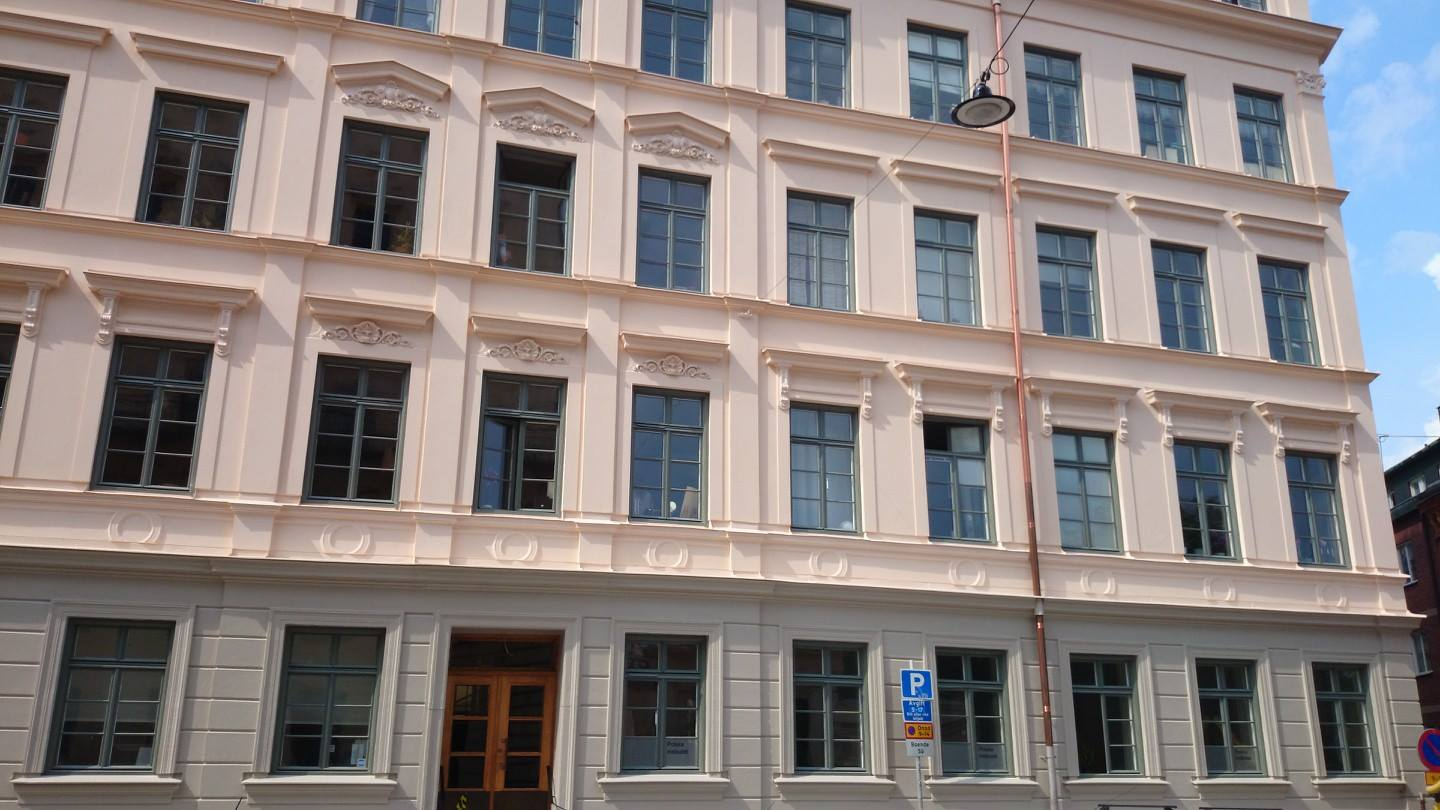
Seat of the Polish Institute in Stockholm

In 2008, Eastern Partnership, a joint initiative of the European Union governing the EU's relationship with the post-Soviet states was initiated by Poland in co-operation with Sweden. It was presented by the foreign ministers of Poland and Sweden at the EU's General Affairs and External Relations Council in Brussels on 26 May 2008 and inaugurated by the EU in Prague, Czech Republic on 7 May 2009.

In July 2018, Poland sent 139 firefighters and 44 vehicles to Sweden, the largest such group from a foreign country to help extinguish the 2018 Sweden wildfires. The Polish firefighters were warmly welcomed by the Swedish population en route to the fires, and during the operation, they even saved the village of Kårböle from the fire.

In July 2022, Poland fully approved Sweden's application for NATO membership.

== Cooperation ==
Poland and Sweden have hosted the 2023 World Men's Handball Championship.

== European Union ==
Sweden joined the European Union in 1995. Poland joined the EU in 2004.

== NATO ==
While Poland became a member of NATO in 1999, Sweden had only become a member of NATO in March 2024. On 22 July 2022, Polish President Andrzej Duda signed and approved the proposals for Finland and Sweden to apply to join NATO.

== Resident diplomatic missions ==
- Poland has an embassy in Stockholm.
- Sweden has an embassy in Warsaw.
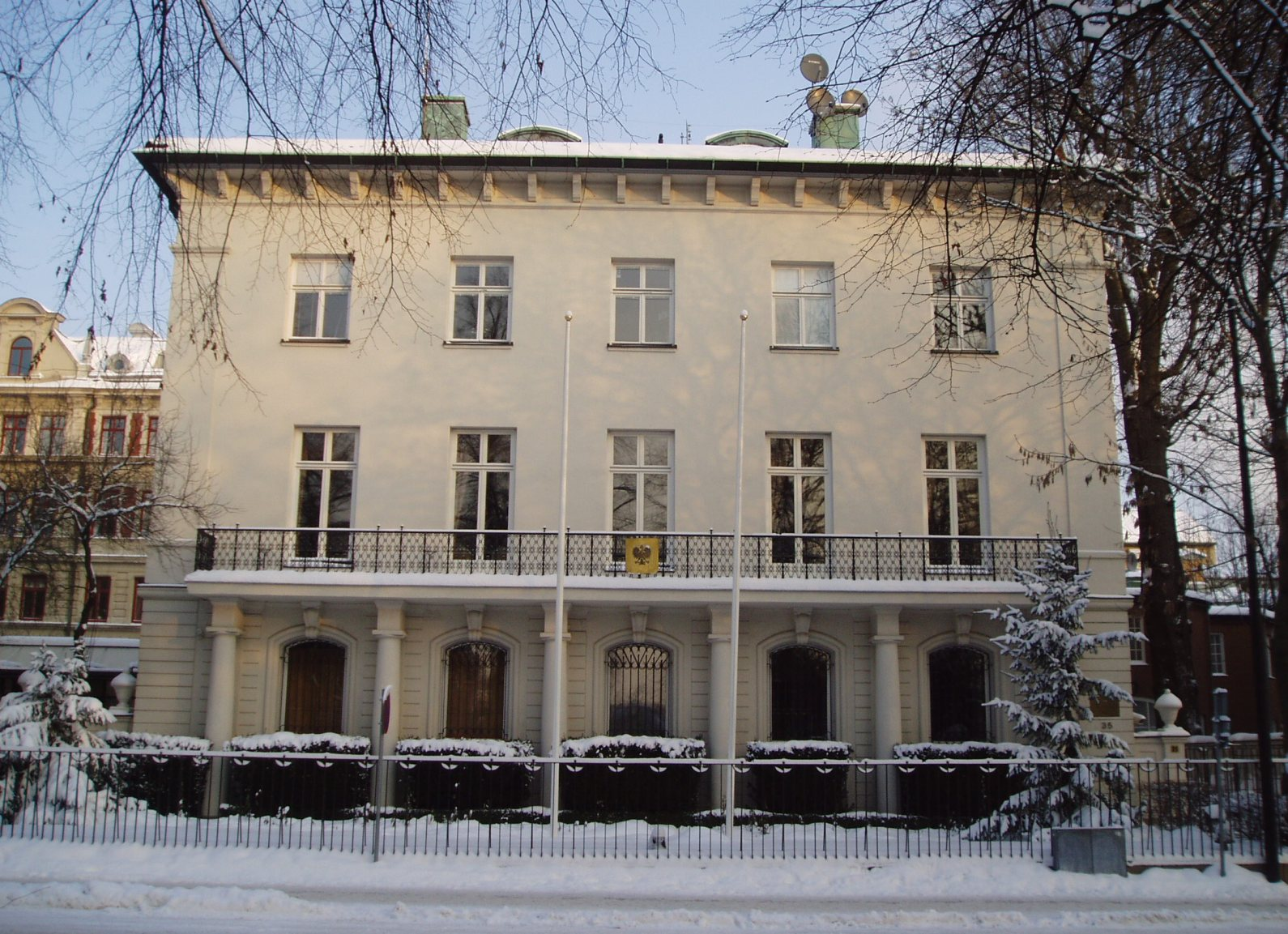
Embassy of Poland in Stockholm

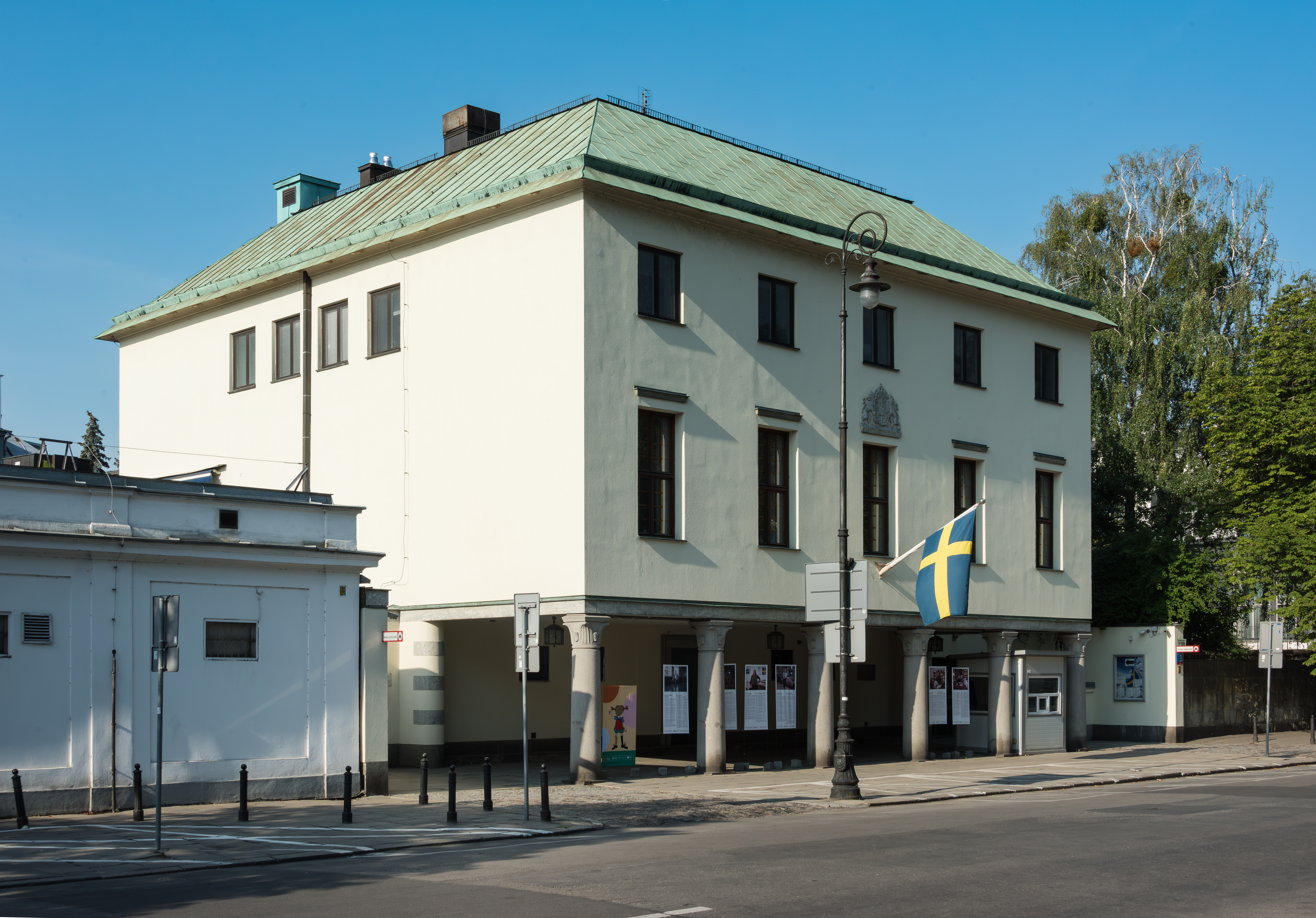
Embassy of Sweden in Warsaw

== Honorary consulates ==
There are honorary consulates of Sweden in Kraków, Gdańsk, Katowice, Szczecin and Wrocław, and an honorary consulate of Poland in Gothenburg.

== See also ==
- Foreign relations of Poland
- Foreign relations of Sweden
- Embassy of Poland, Stockholm
- Poles in Sweden
- Swedes in Poland

== Bibliography ==
- Nowodworski, Witold (1911a). "Stosunki Rzeczypospolitej ze Szwecyą i Danią za Batorego". Przegląd Historyczny (in Polish). 12 (1).
- Nowodworski, Witold (1911b). "Stosunki Rzeczypospolitej ze Szwecyą i Danią za Batorego (Ciąg dalszy)". Przegląd Historyczny (in Polish). 12 (2).
- Kowalska-Postén, Leokadia (1977). "Stosunek sejmu, prasy i opinii politycznej w Szwecji do sprawy polskiej w 1863 r.". Przegląd Historyczny (in Polish). No. 68–4.
