= Holmlund =

Holmlund is a Swedish-language surname. Notable people with the surname include:

- Anna Holmlund, Swedish ski cross athlete
- Anne Holmlund, Finnish politician
- Bertil Holmlund (1947–2025), Swedish economist
- Jan Holmlund (1957–2026), Swedish ski jumper
- Richard Holmlund, Swedish football manager
