= Bertil Carlsson =

Bertil Carlsson or Bertil Karlsson may refer to

- Bertil Carlsson (skier) (1903–1953), Swedish Olympic ski jumper
- Bertil Carlsson (weightlifter) (1901–1975), Swedish Olympic weightlifter
- Bertil R. Carlsson (1901–1959), Swedish Olympic weightlifter
- Bertil Karlsson (1919–2012), Swedish Olympic runner
