= World Chess News =

- Also known as: ChessTV
- Genre: News, Chess
- Country of origin: Sweden
- Original languages: English, Swedish
- No. of episodes: 391

Production
- Running time: 28 min.

Original release
- Release: 2 August 2004 – 3 June 2013

ChessTV or Mitt i Schack (the original Swedish title) is a TV show in Sweden regarding chess. The show aired between 2 August 2004 and 3 June 2013, running for 391 episodes.

The show was aired on the following channels:

Channel
* Öppna Kanalen Stockholm	August 2004 - June 2013
* Öppna Kanalen Skövde	Throughout
* Öppna Kanalen Malmö	Throughout
* Öppna Kanalen Göteborg	Throughout
* Öppna Kanalen Växjö	Throughout
* Öppna Kanalen Örebro	Throughout
* Öppna Kanalen Kumla	Throughout
* Öppna Kanalen Hallsberg	Throughout
* Dream TV Systems	August 2007 - May 2008
* Öppna Kanalen Uddevalla	Throughout
* Öppna Kanalen Jönköping	August 2008 - 2012

== The show ==
The idea behind WCN was to spread chess news all over the world, to show chess players that the effort they put into chess is noticed, and to show non‐chess players that chess inspires and engages all kinds of people: chess is so much more than just an ancient board game. WCN was started as a protest to the negligence of chess by the Swedish media, and was run by a non‐profit organization, dependent on donations. The show was produced by Adriana, Antonia and Amelia Krzymowska, and Alfred and Albert Krzymowski, who together created the idea and concept.

== Cast ==
- Adriana Krzymowska
- Antonia Krzymowska
- Amelia Krzymowska
- Alfred Krzymowski
- Albert Krzymowski
- Arne Johansson
- Bo Kyhle
