= Teofil Lapinski =

Polish military commander (1827–1886)

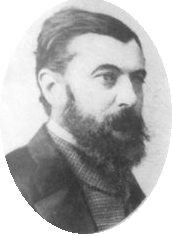
- Born: December 19, 1827; Galicia, Austria
- Died: April 24, 1886 (aged 58) Lemberg, Austria-Hungary
- Allegiance: Austria; Principality of Abkhazia; Hungary; Ottoman Empire; Circassia; Caucasian Imamate
- Conflicts: Russo-Circassian War; Crimean War; Hungarian Revolution of 1848; January Uprising

Teofil Lapinski (Polish: Teofil Łapiński; Adyghe: Тэуфик-Бий, romanized: Təwfik-Biy; 1827–1886) was a Polish military commander, writer.

== Life ==
In 1862 Lapinski published a book, Mountain people of Caucasus and their struggle for freedom against Russia (originally in German, Die Bergvölker des Kaukasus und ihr Freiheitskampf), which is considered one of the early sources on ethnography of peoples of the Northern Caucasus and also contains considerable information on Russia-Georgian relations. At the time of publication, the book was one of the few sources on contemporary Georgia available in Western Europe.

Lapinski was born in Austria-held Galicia and got involved in the Polish struggle for independence. He participated in the Hungarian Revolution of 1848 and then he was fighting in Crimean War as a colonel in the Polish cavalry division of the Turkish army under command of Władysław Stanisław Zamoyski.

== See also ==
- Lapinski expedition
