= Bertil Ströberg =

Swedish Air Force officer

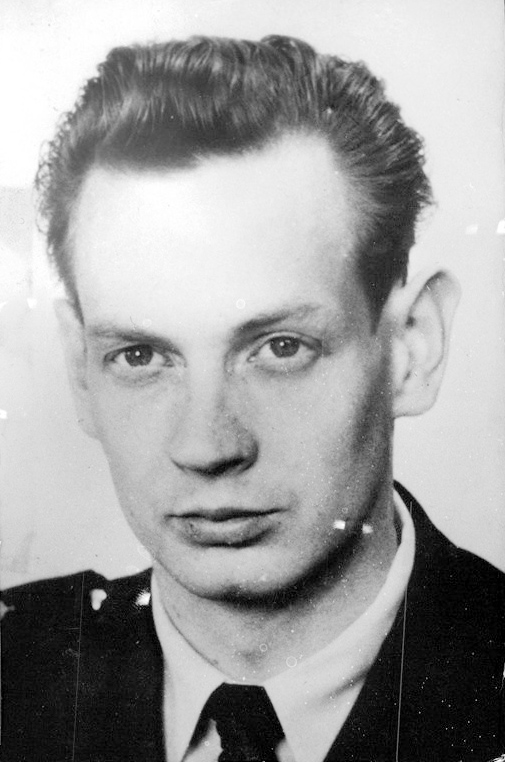
- Ströberg in the 1950s.
- Born: Bertil Johan Olof Ströberg; 30 March 1932; Hulevik, Alvesta Municipality, Sweden
- Died: 25 March 2012 (aged 79); Sweden
- Military career
- Allegiance: Sweden
- Branch: Swedish Air Force
- Service years: 1949–1983
- Rank: Lieutenant colonel
- Commands: Air Staff's Signal Communications Department

Bertil Johan Olof Ströberg (30 March 1932 – 25 March 2012) was a Swedish Air Force officer convicted of spying for Poland during the Cold War. In 1983 he was sentenced to six years in prison for aggravated espionage by the Stockholm District Court. Ströberg insisted on his innocence for nearly 30 years.

== Career ==
Ströberg grew up in Hulevik, Västra Torsås Parish between Småland and Blekinge. After six years of folkskola (people's school), the 17-year-old Ströberg enlisted in 1949 and became a signaller. He was posted at Blekinge Wing (F 17) and became a non-commissioned officer. He graduated from the Swedish Armed Forces School for Secondary Education in Uppsala and became an officer. Ströberg started his career at the Air Staff. He married Marianne Bäcklund (born 1935) and they had two children. They lived in a small house on Lidingö. At the time of his arrest Ströberg was a lieutenant colonel and head of Air Staff's Signal Communications Department, and had access to information on all of the military communication systems.

== Arrest ==
Ströberg was arrested on 20 May 1983 at the Central Post Office on Vasagatan in Stockholm by the Swedish Security Service after he tried to collect a poste restante letter addressed to "Sven-Roland Larsson". A few weeks earlier the Polish Embassy in Stockholm received a letter signed "Sven-Roland Larsson" with a series of classified military information and a request for SEK 25,000 ($3,400) in exchange for further information. The money would then be sent to "Sven-Roland Larsson". Suspected they were being set up, the Polish Embassy contacted the Ministry for Foreign Affairs who handed the letter over to the Swedish Security Service who set up a trap for Ströberg. He was then arrested.

Ströberg claimed he met Larsson in connection with that he had been assaulted by unknown men at Djurgården in Stockholm. Ströberg claimed he averted the beatings and the unknown men fled. Then Ströberg gave his business card to Larsson in case there would be a legal aftermath. Ströberg further claimed that after some time he received a letter from Larsson (who Ströberg said had a "foreign appearance and spoke broken Swedish") because Larsson needed help to collect a letter at the Central Post Office in Stockholm.

== Trial ==
The courts dismissed Ströberg's statement as unreasonable, stating that he made up the story with "Sven-Roland Larsson" as a cover story. Handwriting experts could not link the letter to Ströberg. Ströberg was sentenced in 1983, less than two months after he was arrested, to six years imprisonment for aggravated espionage. The Stockholm District Court disagreed in its verdict and when the case was dealt with by the Svea Court of Appeal three months later, the conviction was upheld, but also here the court was in disagreement. Two members of the court were divergent and considered the overall evidence was not of sufficient strength and that, even if it was unreasonable, could not be ruled out that Ströberg's story was truthful. In addition, there was great emphasis on other military officers description of Ströberg.

Ströberg was released on parole from Kumla Prison in May 1986 after serving three years. Ströberg maintained his innocence and in the summer of 1988 Ströberg was granted a trial de novo by the Supreme Court. The application was granted when extraordinary reasons for retrial was considered to exist. The case was heard in the Svea Court of Appeal for a new trial in which the facts were considered compatible with both that Ströberg was the perpetrator and the victim of a conspiracy. Ströberg's unreasonable information about his contacts with "Sven-Roland Larsson" meant, however, that the only plausible explanation was that Ströberg was the perpetrator and the District Court's verdict was upheld.

== Disputed allegations ==
The case attracted attention in 2009 in the television program Kalla fakta on TV4. The program revealed that a Swedish spy, Lennart Savemark, who infiltrated the Soviet Embassy on behalf of the Swedish Security Service, had been subjected to "Sven-Roland Larsson" already in 1957. He stated that a copy of a report he wrote to his clients at the Security Service detailing his work at the Soviet Embassy suddenly showed up in the mail at his workplace at the embassy - with a handwritten note in which the signatory called themselves "Sven-Roland Larsson" and requested money for additional information.

Savemark had after seeing a television feature about the case in 1985 contacted the Security Police and told that he very well knew the name "Sven-Roland Larsson". According to the television program Kalla fakta there was nothing that suggested that Ströberg could have been linked to this letter and Ströberg's lawyer applied for trial de novo at the Supreme Court, which in turn sent the case to the Prosecutor-General of Sweden. Among other things, new information from the Security Service's archive was invoked which was not raised in the preliminary investigation.

In February 2010, the Prosecutor-General decided to reopen the investigation against Ströberg. The decision was an important principle importance, as the basis for such action is based on the assessment that the new information was of such importance that they could be crucial to the case. On 14 October 2011, the Supreme Court denied the trial de novo on the grounds that it was doubtful that these information did not exist in the original preliminary investigation, but that the new evidence was nevertheless not such that the Court of Appeal's conclusions could be disrupted and that the evidence therefore neither individually or together, would likely lead to an acquittal of the alleged in the Court of Appeal. The Supreme Court also stated that "given that it is almost 30 years since the incident took place, the prerequisites to now meaningfully implement a new trial and to take it further is also very limited".

== Later life and death ==
Ströberg had ever since he was arrested claimed that he was the unwitting victim of a conspiracy. After serving his sentence Ströberg worked as a broker before his retirement. He died 79 years old on 25 March 2012 following a yearlong battle against cancer.
