= Poles in Sweden =

Citizens and residents of Sweden who emigrated from Poland

Poles in Sweden Svenskpolacker Szwedzcy Polacy
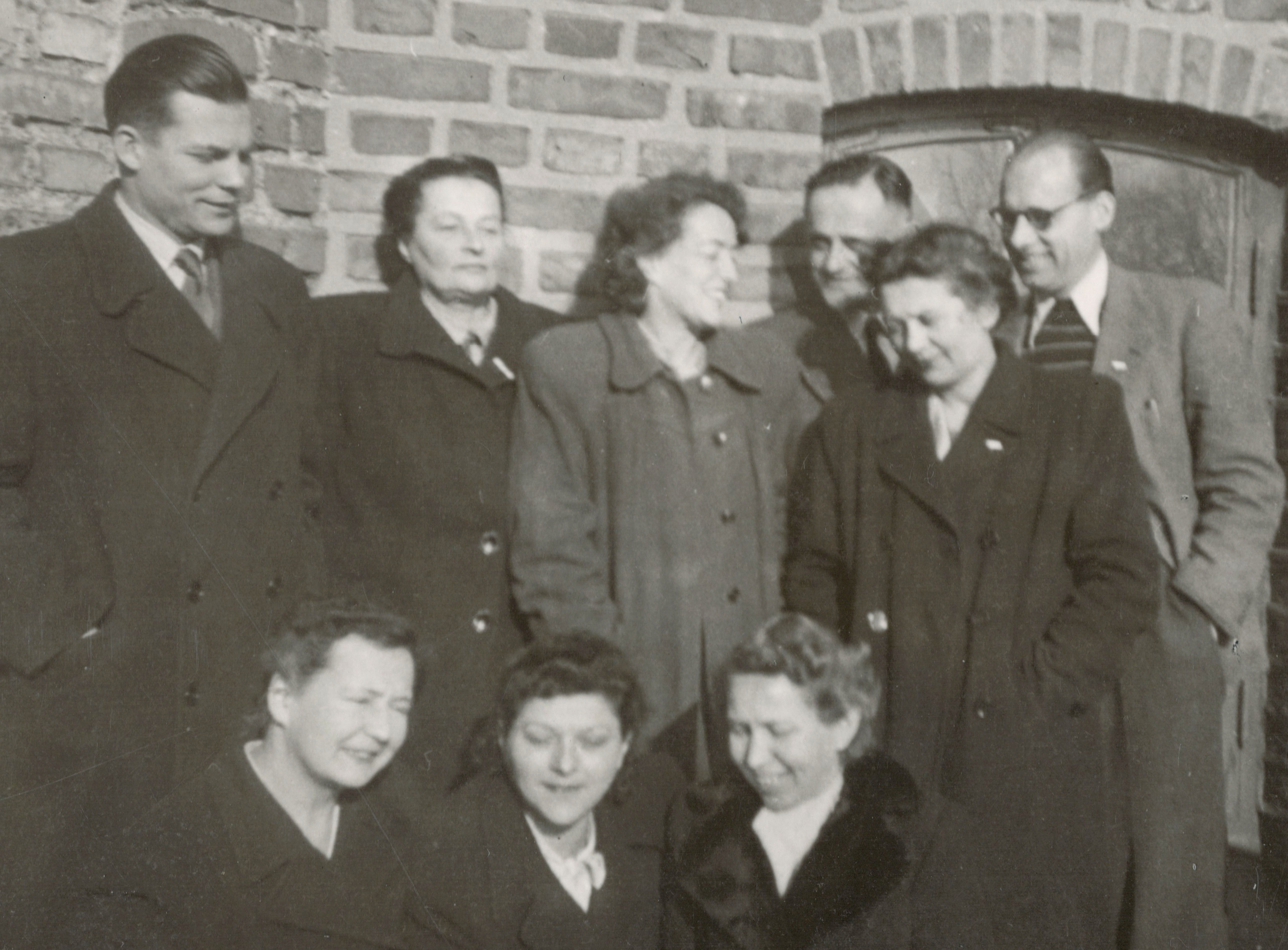
- Poles in Sweden, 1946

Total population
- 118,060 (Note: Containing the numbers of persons who are born in Poland and persons who are born in Sweden with two parents born in Poland.) (2024)

Regions with significant populations
- Stockholm, Malmö

Languages
- Polish, Yiddish, Swedish

Religion
- Predominantly Christianity (Roman Catholicism, Protestantism) and minority: Judaism, Irreligious

Related ethnic groups
- Poles, Ashkenazi Jews

Poles in Sweden (Swedish: Svenskpolacker) are citizens and residents of Sweden who emigrated from Poland.

== Demographics ==
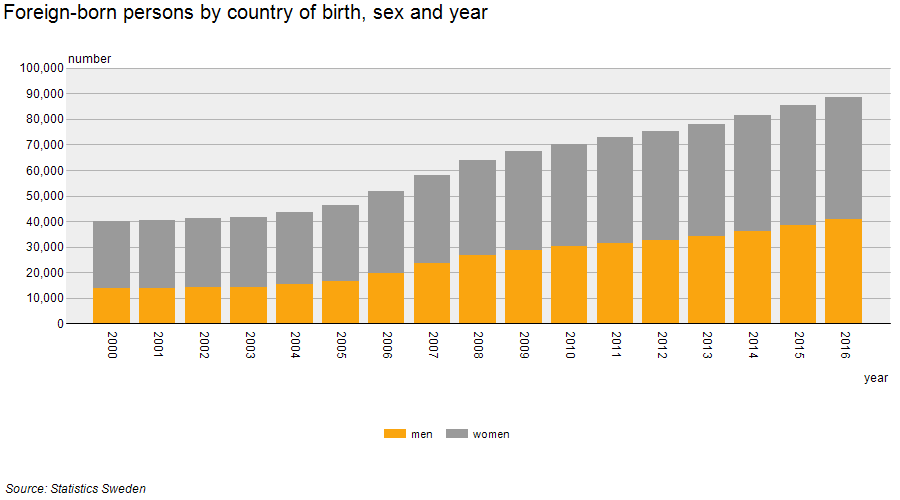
Poland-born persons in Sweden by sex, 2000-2016 (Statistics Sweden).

According to Statistics Sweden, as of 2024, there are a total 100,062 Poland-born immigrants living in Sweden. Both native Poles, as well as descendants of Polish Jewish immigrants from Poland.

== History ==
Sweden was the main destination for many immigrants from partitioned Poland. In 1797, Polish national hero Tadeusz Kościuszko stayed in Stockholm and Gothenburg.

In the spring of 1863, armed Polish volunteers from Western Europe assisted by foreigners of various nationalities attempted to reach partitioned Poland by sea via Sweden. This Lapinski expedition stopped on the island of Öland and in Malmö, where it was met with sympathy of the local Swedes. The Swedish authorities, fearing Russia, were forced to put the Poles under arrest, so the Poles departed in May 1863 to attempt a naval landing near Klaipėda.

Some 200 Poles lived in Sweden in the 1920s.

During World War II, the Polish resistance movement, in cooperation with Polish outposts in Sweden, organized escapes of Poles from German-occupied Poland to Sweden by sea.

In 1948, the Polish Veterans Association in Gothenburg was established by former Polish prisoners of Nazi German concentration camps, and in 1962 it was transformed into the Polish Cultural Association in Gothenburg.

== Education ==
In 2010, there were 4,186 students with Polish as their mother tongue who participated in the state-run Swedish for Immigrants adult language program. Of these pupils, 251 had 0–6 years of education in their home country (Antal utbildningsår i hemlandet), 241 had 7–9 years of education in their home country, and 3,694 had 10 years education or more in their home country. As of 2012, 5,100 pupils with Polish as their mother tongue and 5,079 Poland-born students were enrolled in the language program.

== Organizations ==
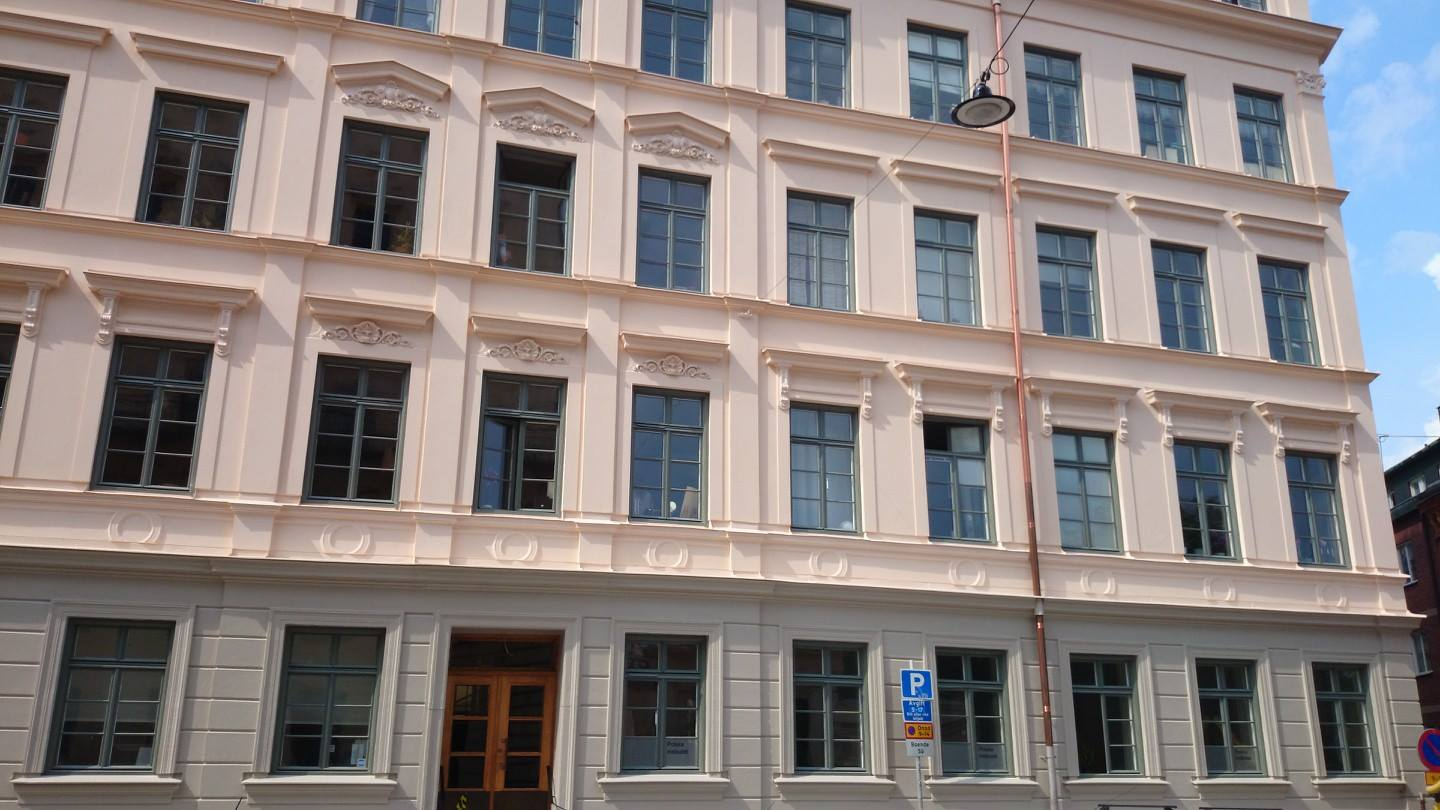
Polish Institute in Stockholm

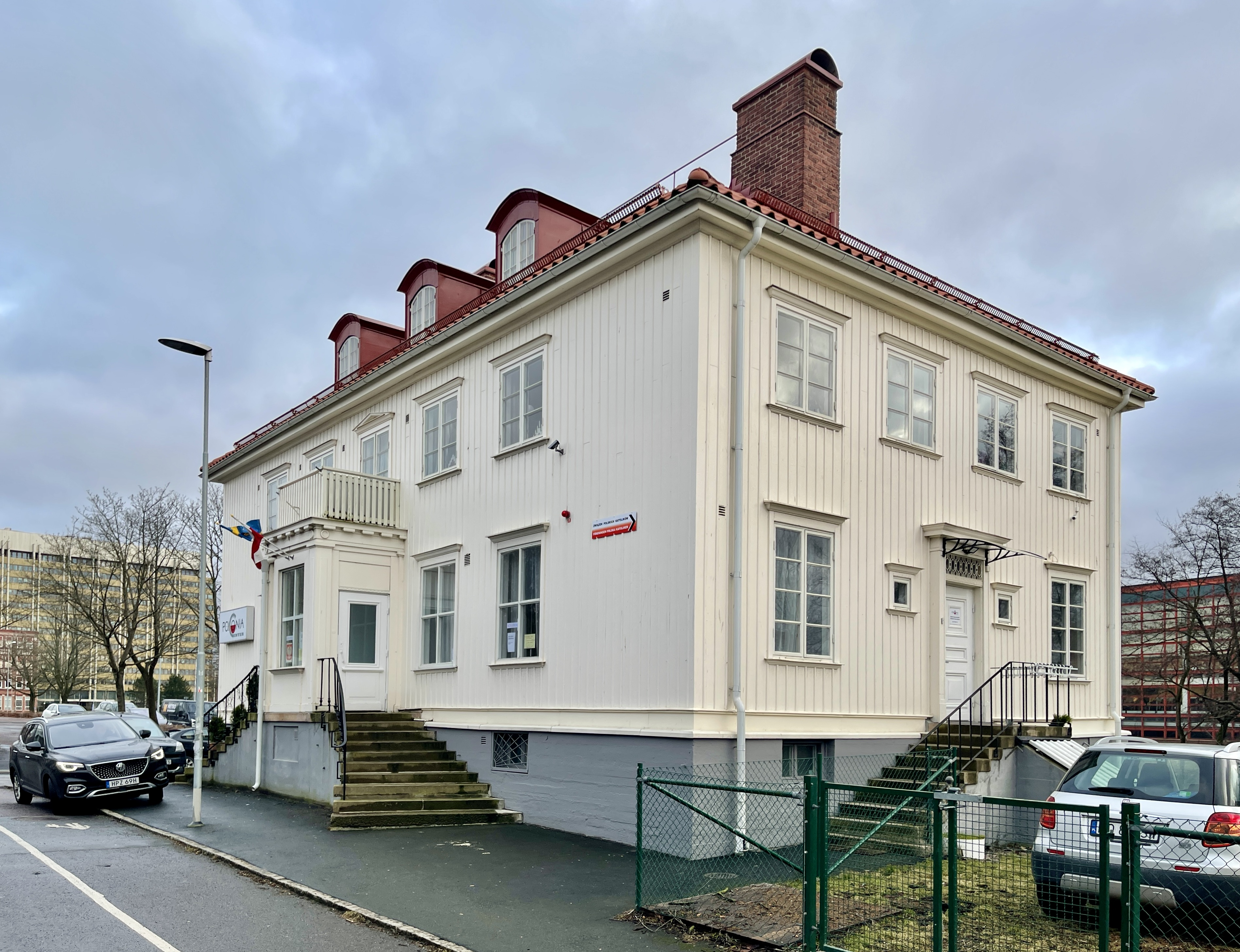
Polonia Center in Gothenburg

There are several Polish organizations in Sweden, incl. the Polish Institute in Stockholm, the Polish Cultural Association in Gothenburg, and Polonia Center in Gothenburg.

== Notable people ==
- Anna Anka
- Dorotea Bromberg
- Paula Bieler
- Anitha Bondestam
- Paweł Cibicki
- Wonna I DeJong
- Henrik Dorsin
- Jerzy Einhorn
- Greekazo
- Peter Jablonski
- Catherine Jagiellon
- Peter Jewszczewski
- Katrine Marcal (born Kielos to Polish immigrant parents)
- Kissie (Alexandra Nilsson-Petroniak, her mother is a Polish immigrant)
- Oscar Lewicki
- Henryk Lipp
- Stefan Liv
- Jerzy Luczak-Szewczyk
- Bea Malecki
- Dominika Peczynski
- Martin Rolinski
- Eliza Roszkowska Öberg
- Thomas Rusiak
- Jerzy Sarnecki
- Danny Saucedo
- Izabella Scorupco
- Sebastian Siemiatkowski
- Czeslaw Slania
- Amanda Sokolnicki (political editor of DN)
- Bea Szenfeld
- Robert Wahlström
- Cissi Wallin born in Sweden to Polish parents
- Michael Winiarski (journalist in DN)
- Peter Wolodarski
- Michal Zajkowski
- Maciej Zaremba
- Małgorzata Pieczyńska
- Z.E. (born to Polish parents as Józef Wojciechowicz)
- Katrin Zytomierska

== See also ==
- Poland–Sweden relations
- Polish diaspora
- Immigration to Sweden
- Poles in Denmark
- Poles in Finland
- Poles in Norway
