= Bertil Stålhane =

Swedish chemist, technical researcher and author

Johan Bertil Stålhane (1 July 1902 in Stockholm – 17 October 1992) was a Swedish chemist, technical researcher and writer.
