= Sas van Bosch baronets =

Extinct baronetcy in the Baronetage of England

The Sas van Bosch Baronetcy, of Holland, was a title in the Baronetage of England. It was created on 22 October 1680 for Gelebrand Sas van Bosch, secretary to the Admiralty at Rotterdam. However, nothing further is known of him or any possible descendants.

== Sas van Bosch baronets, of Holland (1680) ==
- Sir Gelebrand Sas van Bosch, 1st Baronet (died c. 1720)
