= Ohlson baronets =

Title in the Baronetage of the United Kingdom

The Ohlson baronetcy, of Scarborough in the North Riding of the County of York, was a title in the Baronetage of the United Kingdom. It was created on 24 January 1920 for Sir Erik Ohlson, a Swedish-born shipping magnate and coal and timber merchant. The title became extinct on the death of the fourth Baronet in 2026.

== Ohlson baronets, of Scarborough (1920) ==
- Sir Erik Olof Ohlson, 1st Baronet (1873–1934)
- Sir Eric James Ohlson, 2nd Baronet (1911–1983)
- Sir Brian Eric Christopher Ohlson, 3rd Baronet (1936–2017)
- Sir Peter Michael Ohlson, 4th Baronet (1939–2026)

The baronetcy is now extinct.

== Sources ==
- Kidd, Charles, Williamson, David (editors). Debrett's Peerage and Baronetage (1990 edition). New York: St Martin's Press, 1990.
- Leigh Rayment's list of baronets
