= Vanderbrande baronets =

Extinct baronetcy in the Baronetage of England

The Vanderbrande Baronetcy, of Cleverskirke, was a title in the Baronetage of England. It was created on 9 June 1699 for John Peter Vanderbrande. The title is presumed to have become extinct on the death of the second Baronet some time after 1713.

== Vanderbrande baronets, of Cleverskirke (1699) ==
- Sir John Peter Vanderbrande, 1st Baronet (died c. 1713)
- Sir Cornelius Vanderbrande, 2nd Baronet (died after 1713)
