= Von Friesendorff =

Swedish noble family

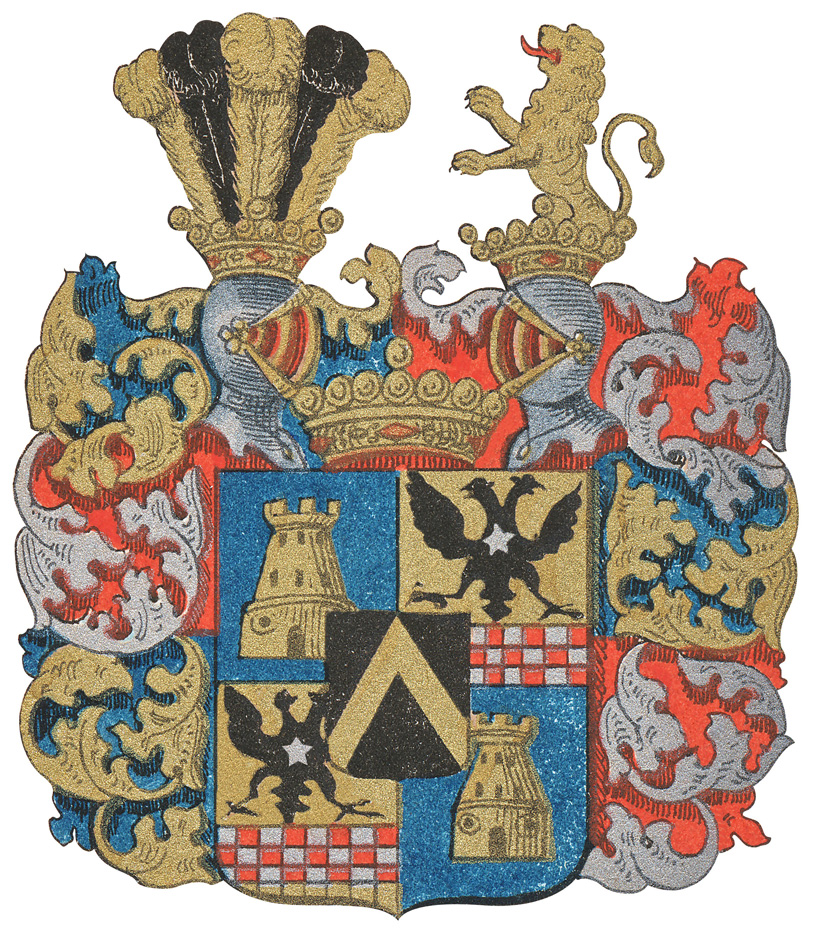
Arms of the baronial branch of the von Friesensdorff family

The Friesendorff family, also spelled von Friesendorff is an old Swedish noble family of German origin.

== History ==
The family originated from the County of Mark in Westphalia, where already in the 13th century a Knight named Peter Fresendorp lived. After some time its members have spread to other German countries, as well as to the Netherlands, Courland and also to Finland and Sweden. In 1665 Johan Fredrik von Friesendorff received the title of Imperial Baron by Emperor Leopold I, while on 16 September 1705 the family received the title of Baron in Sweden from King Charles XII. One branch of the family later settled in England, where they became part of British nobility as Baronets.

== Notable members ==
- Johan Fredrik von Friesendorff (1617–1669) Riksfriherre, Baronet and member of the Privy Council of Sweden

== See also ==
- von Friesendorff baronets
