= Embassy of Poland, Stockholm =

Embassy of Poland in Stockholm
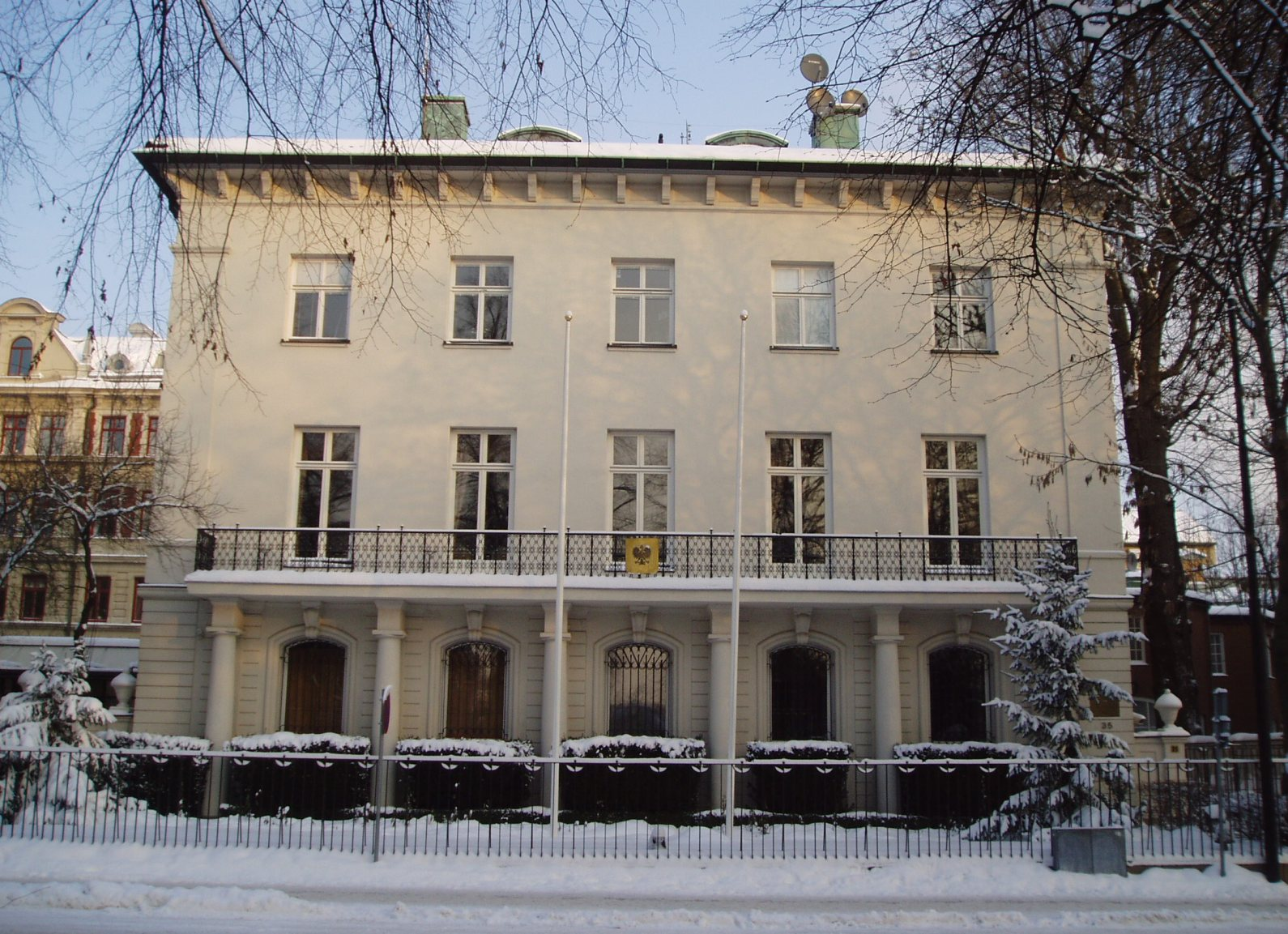
- Polish Embassy chancellery in Stockholm
- Location: Karlavägen, Stockholm, Sweden
- Address: Karlavägen 35, 114 32 Stockholm
- Coordinates: 59°20′29.19″N 18°4′24.24″E
- Ambassador: Karolina Ostrzyniewska (Chargé d’affaires a.i.)

The Embassy of Poland in Stockholm (Swedish: Republiken Polens Ambassad i Stockholm; Polish: Ambasada Rzeczypospolitej Polskiej w Sztokholmie) is the diplomatic mission of the Republic of Poland to the Kingdom of Sweden. The chancery is located at Karlavägen 35, Stockholm.

The main chancery of the Polish embassy in Stockholm is located in the city centre district of Östermalm on a street which borders the Humlegården park. The building which houses the embassy is a mix of 1920s modernist design and classical architecture which also incorporates a number of elements of the late Art Deco style such as the heavily ornamented but functional window surrounds. The consular section which is located at Prästgårdsgatan 5, in the suburb of Sundbyberg.

== See also ==
- List of diplomatic missions of Poland
- Poland–Sweden relations
