= Van Colster baronets =

Former title in the Baronetage of England

The van Colster Baronetcy, of Amsterdam, was a title in the Baronetage of England. It was created on 28 February 1645 for Joseph van Colster, a Dutch citizen who resided at Fulham, Middlesex. The title became extinct on his death in 1665.

== Van Colster baronets, of Amsterdam (1645) ==
- Sir Joseph van Colster, 1st Baronet (died 1665)
