= Bertil Svensson =

Swedish footballer

Personal information
- Full name: Bertil Svensson
- Position: Goalkeeper

Senior career*
Years	Team	Apps	(Gls)
1961–1962	Malmö FF	26	(0)
- * Club domestic league appearances and goals

Bertil Svensson is a Swedish former footballer who played as a goalkeeper.
