= Johan von Friesendorff =

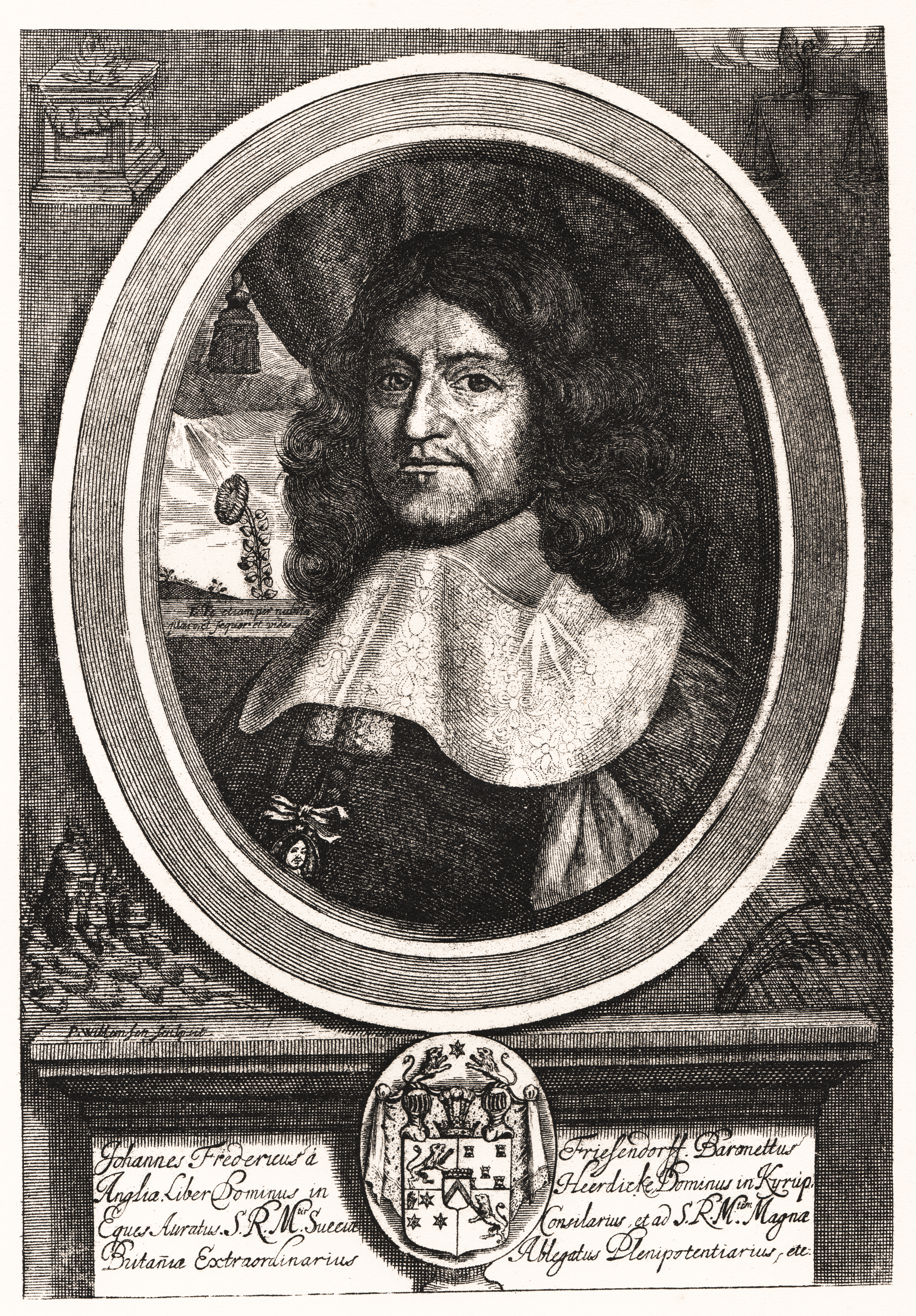
Johan Fredrik von Friesendorff on a contemporary engraving.

Riksfriherre Sir Johan Fredrik von Friesendorff, 1st Baronet (1617–1669) was a Swedish diplomat born in Bremen.

== Early life ==
His father was Hieronymus von Friesendorff (b. 1565), the Amtmann (prefect) of Rotenburg an der Wümme and Bremervörde, and his mother was from the von Buchwald family.

== Career ==
His ability was recognised by the Swedish Lord High Treasurer Gabriel Oxenstierna, and he was appointed as Swedish resident in Portugal by him in 1649, and then appointed as a member of the Swedish Cabinet four years later. In 1656 he married Margareta Elisabet Gärffelt.

Shrewd and with a thorough knowledge of cabinet- and trade secrets, he was used by the Swedish state in many negotiations and diplomatic endeavours, including finishing an alliance with England in 1661, when he was also dubbed an English knight and created a baronet by Charles II (under the name of "Sir John Frederick van Freisendorf"). A few years later he was appointed Reichsfreiherr by the Emperor Leopold, and was also given the titles Counsellor of the Court and member of the National Board of Trade in Sweden.

== Children ==
His sons were raised to Swedish friherre dignity by King Charles XII in 1705.

1. Friherre Sir Johan Fridrich Frisendorph, 2nd Baronet (1657–1725)
2. Friherre Carl Gustaf Frisendorph (1663–1715)
3. Friherre Magnus Gabriel Frisendorph (1668–1709), killed in action at the Battle of Poltava.

Baronetage of England
New creation	Baronet (of Hirdech); 1661 – 1669	Succeeded by Johan Fridrich von Friesendorff
