= Bertiella =

Bertiella may refer to:

- Bertiella (fungus), a genus of fungi in the family Teichosporaceae
- Bertiella (flatworm), a genus of tapeworms in the family Anoplocephalidae
