= Speelman baronets =

Extinct baronetcy in the Baronetage of England

The Speelman Baronetcy, of the Netherlands, is a title in the Baronetage of England. It was created on 9 September 1686 for the two-year-old Cornelis Speelman, who later became a General in the Dutch Army. At the same time his mother was given the rank of the widow of a baronet. Speelman was the only son of Johan Cornelis Speelman (1659–1686) and a grandson of Governor-General of the Dutch East Indies Cornelis Speelman (1628–1684). Johan died before the letters patent intended to create him a baronet had passed the Great Seal. The sixth Baronet was Burgemeester of the city of Harlingen in the Netherlands.

In 1817, Sir Cornelis Speelman, the 3rd Baronet, was raised into the Dutch nobility by King William I of the Netherlands. Since then all his descendants belong to the untitled nobility with the Dutch honorific title Jonkheer, with inheritance in male line. This noble family became extinct with the 8th and last baronet in 2005.

== Speelman baronets (1686) ==
- Sir Cornelis Speelman, 1st Baronet (1684–1746)
- Sir Cornelis Speelman, 2nd Baronet (1722–1787)
- Sir Cornelis Speelman, 3rd Baronet (1747–1825)
- Sir Abraham Florentius Speelman, 4th Baronet (1784–1840)
- Sir Cornelis Jacob Abraham Speelman, 5th Baronet (1823–1898)
- Sir Helenus Marinus Speelman, 6th Baronet (1852–1907)
- Sir Cornelis Jacob Speelman, 7th Baronet (1881–1949)
- Sir Cornelis Jacob Speelman, 8th and last Baronet (1917–2005)
