= Marcia Friesen =

Canadian engineering educator

Marcia R. Friesen is a Canadian engineering educator and academic administrator, the dean of the Price Faculty of Engineering at the University of Manitoba. The topics of her research have included engineering education, the professional development of engineers and the experiences of immigrant engineers, and agent-based modeling of health-care systems.

== Education and career ==
Friesen was an undergraduate student of agricultural engineering at the University of Manitoba, graduating in 1993, and worked in industry as an environmental engineer and agricultural engineering consultant.

Returning the University of Manitoba, she received a master's degree in engineering education in 2003, and completed her Ph.D. in biosystems engineering in 2009, with the dissertation Participant outcomes, perceptions, and experiences in the Internationally Educated Engineers Qualification Program, University of Manitoba: An exploratory study.

She directed the Internationally Educated Engineering Qualifications Program from 2003 until 2017, directed the Centre for Engineering Professional Practice and Engineering Education from 2017 until 2020, and held the NSERC Chair in Design Engineering from 2018 until 2023. She was named dean of engineering in 2020, becoming the first woman dean of engineering at the University of Manitoba. Under her leadership, the faculty of engineering founded a new engineering education department in 2025.

== Recognition ==
Friesen is the 2016 recipient of the Champion of Engineering Education Award of Engineers Geoscientists Manitoba. The Association of Consulting Engineering Companies – Canada gave her their 2021 ACEC Chair's Award.

She was elected as a Fellow of the Canadian Academy of Engineering in 2023, and as a Fellow of the Engineering Institute of Canada in 2024.
