= Erik Ohlson =

Swedish-born British businessman (1873–1934)

Sir Erik Ohlson Bt
- Born: Erik Olof Ohlson; 19 July 1873; Oppeby, Fellingsbro, Sweden
- Died: 20 March 1934 (aged 60)
- Occupation(s): Shipping magnate, coal and timber merchant

Sir Erik Olof Ohlson, 1st Baronet (19 July 1873 – 20 March 1934) was a Swedish-born British shipping magnate and coal and timber merchant.

Ohlson was a son of a farmer in the village of Oppeby in Fellingsbro parish, Sweden. He spent ten years in the coal importing business in Sweden. In 1902, he emigrated to Hull, England, and established the firm of Ohlson & Co, shipowners and brokers, coal exporters, and timber importers.

He was knighted in 1915 and created a baronet, of Scarborough, in the 1920 New Year Honours for his efforts to bring Sweden into the British camp during the First World War.

Ohlson was succeeded in the baronetcy by his elder son, Sir Eric James Ohlson (1911–1983).

== Footnotes ==
Baronetage of the United Kingdom
New creation	Baronet (of Scarborough); 1920–1934	Succeeded by Eric James Ohlson
