= Richard von Friesen =

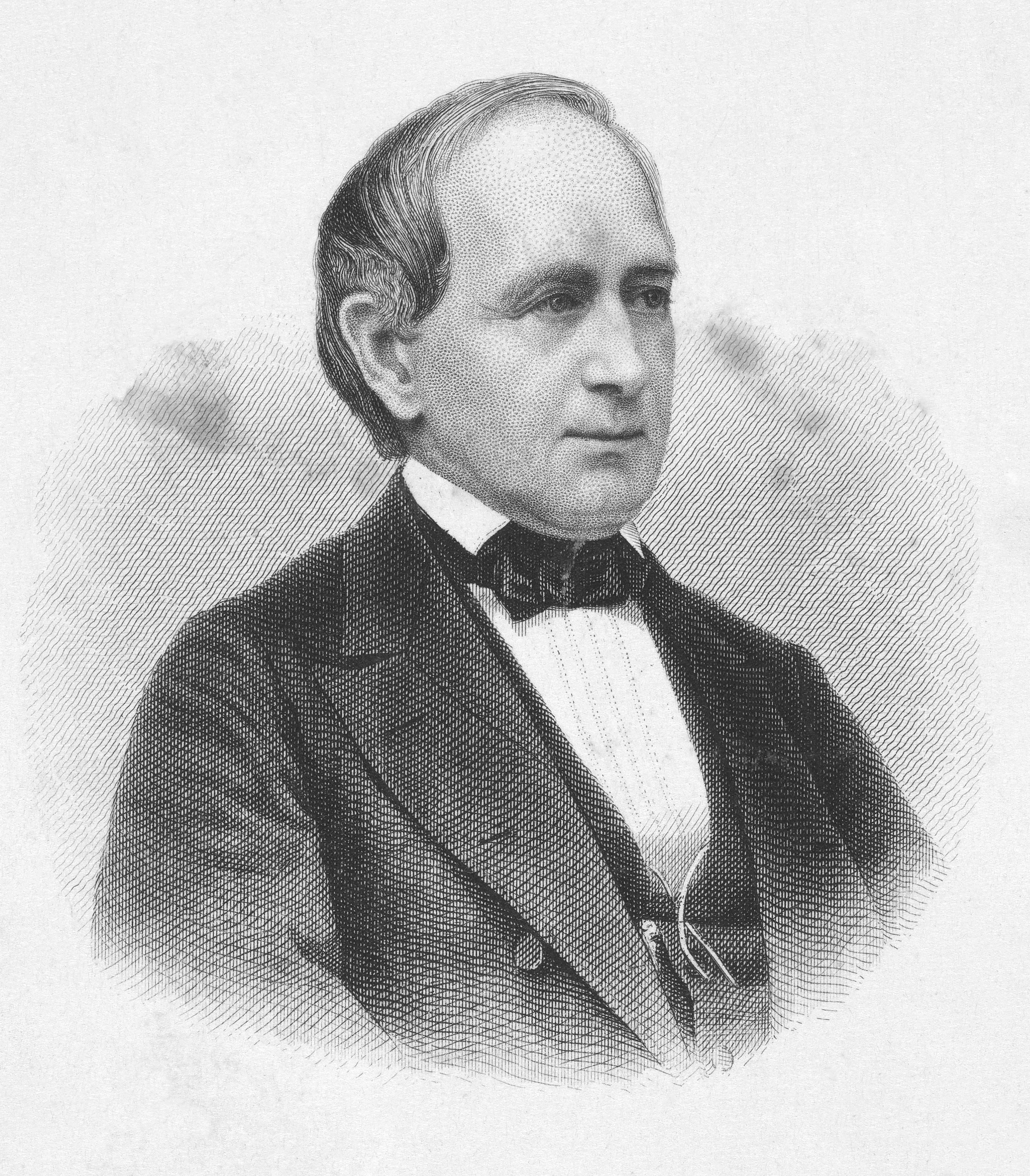

Richard von Friesen (9 August 1808 in Thürmsdorf – 25 February 1884 in Dresden) was a statesman of Saxony.

He was educated at Göttingen and Leipzig, entered the civil service of Saxony, and rose to be minister of the interior from 1849 to 1852. In 1858 he became minister of finance, and in 1867 of foreign affairs also. He was appointed in 1870 a commissioner to negotiate in Versailles with the South German states treaties for the unification of Germany. From 1871 until his retirement in 1876, he was president of the ministry.
