= Bertil von Friesen =

Swedish physician

Bertil von Friesen (1901–1990) was a Swedish physician.
