= Bertil Carlsson (weightlifter) =

Swedish weightlifter

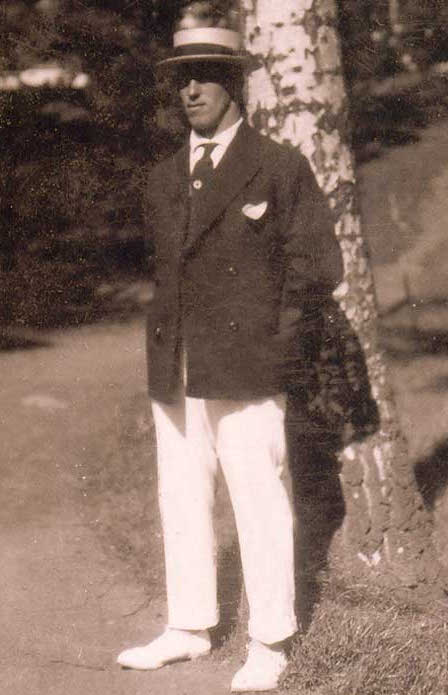
- Carlsson in 1928

Personal information
- Born: 5 March 1901 Huskvarna, Sweden
- Died: 23 February 1959 (aged 74) Jönköping, Sweden

Sport
- Sport: Weightlifting
- Club: Huskvarna IF

Sven Bertil Uno Carlsson (5 March 1901 – 23 February 1959) was a Swedish weightlifter. He competed in the middleweight division at the 1928 Summer Olympics, but failed to finish.
