= Von Friesendorff baronets =

Title in the Baronetage of England

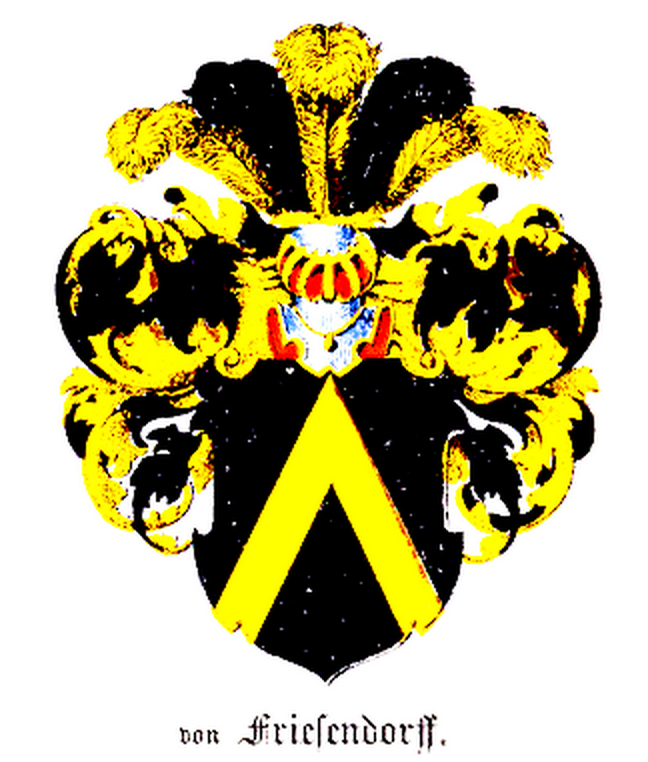
Coat of arms of Baron Friesendorff family

The von Friesendorff baronetcy, of Hirdech, Sweden, is a title in the Baronetage of England.

On 4 October 1661, Johan von Friesendorff, Swedish ambassador to England, was created a baronet by Charles II. In 1665 he was appointed Riksfriherre by the Emperor Leopold.

Although the baronetcy was considered to have become dormant in 1670 after the death of the 1st Baronet due to his descendants living in Sweden, use of the title was maintained by the family; the 11th Baronet, Rickard Fredrik Knut von Friesendorff, was admitted to the Official Roll of the Baronetage in 2018.

== von Friesendorff baronets, of Hirdech, Sweden (1661) ==
- Sir Johan Fredrik von Friesendorff, 1st Baronet (1617-1669)
- Sir Johan Fredrik von Friesendorff, 2nd Baronet (1657-1725) (succeeded by his son)
- Sir Johan Fredrik von Friesendorff, 3rd Baronet (1700-1742) (succeeded by his son)
- Sir Johan Fredrik von Friesendorff, 4th Baronet (1740-1794) (succeeded by his cousin once removed, grandson of 2nd son of 2nd Bt)
- Sir Carl Gabriel von Friesendorff, 5th Baronet (1758-1824) (succeeded by his cousin)
- Sir Fredrik Reinhold von Friesendorff, 6th Baronet (1765-1829) (succeeded by his kinsman, great-grandson of 2nd son of 1st Bt)
- Sir Fredrik Ludvig Alexander von Friesendorff, 7th Baronet (1780-1847) (succeeded by his son)
- Sir Claes Fredrik Ludvig von Friesendorff, 8th Baronet (1832-1897) (succeeded by his son)
- Sir Fredrik Axel Valdemar von Friesendorff, 9th Baronet (1870-1962) (succeeded by his son)
- Sir Claes Fredrik Wilhelm von Friesendorff, 10th Baronet (1903-1974) (succeeded by his son)
- Sir Rickard Fredrik Knut von Friesendorff, 11th Baronet (1937-2024) (succeeded by his son)
- Sir Johann Fredrik von Friesendorff, 12th Baronet (1966-)

The heir apparent is the present baronet's second son David Johan Baron von Friesendorff (b. 1996)

== See also ==
- Johan von Friesendorff
- von Friesendorff
