= Bertil Holmlund =

Swedish economist (1947–2025)

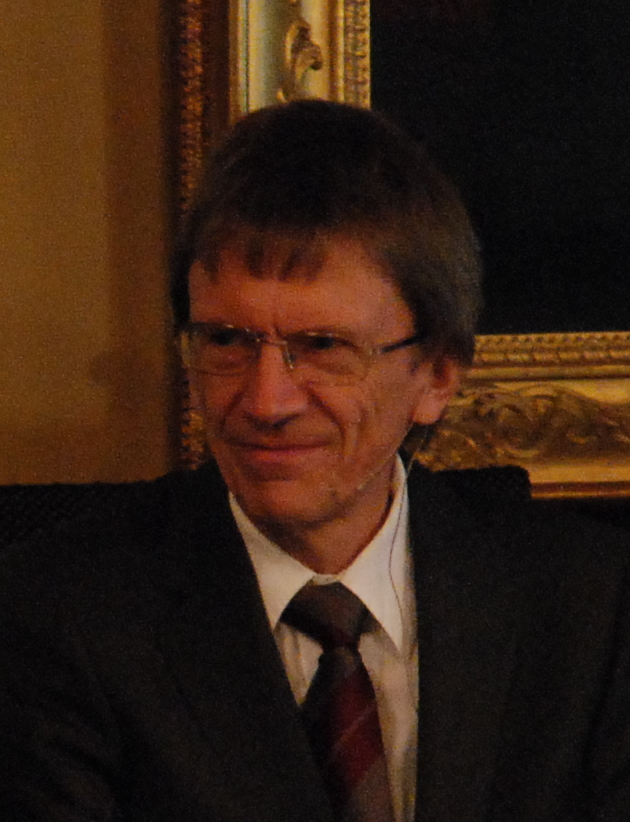
Bertil Holmlund

Bertil Holmlund (5 February 1947 – 8 July 2025) was a Swedish economist, and Professor of Economics at Uppsala University. He was a member of the prize committee for the Nobel Memorial Prize in Economic Sciences from 1998 to 2001 and from 2005 to 2006 and was the chairman of the committee from 2008 to 2010.

Holmlund was a member of the Royal Swedish Academy of Sciences since 2004.
