= Lapinski expedition =

1863 Polish naval expedition during the January Uprising

In 1863, Polish General Teofil Lapinski led a failed naval expedition to deliver munitions from England to the insurgents of the January Uprising in the Baltic Sea.

== Bibliography ==
- Guttry, Aleksander (1870). Pan Ludwik Mierosławski jego dzieła i działania (in Polish). Liege: J. J. Kraszewskiego. pp. 52–53.
- Hubert, Witold (1939), Polskie dążenia morskie (in Polish), Liga Morska i Kolonialna, pp. 100–107
- Kosiarz, Edmund (1978). Wojny na Bałtyku: X-XIX w. [Wars in the Baltic Sea: 10th–19th Centuries]. Historia morska (in Polish). Gdańsk: Wydaw. Morskie. pp. 433–439. OCLC 5074348.
- Mickiewicz, Władysław (1908). Emigracya polska 1860-1890 (in Polish). Kraków: Księgarnia Spółki Wydawniczej Polskiej. p. 33.
