= List of baronetcies in the Baronetage of the United Kingdom: P =

Peerages and baronetcies of Britain and Ireland
Extant	All
Dukes	Dukedoms
Marquesses	Marquessates
Earls	Earldoms
Viscounts	Viscountcies
Barons	Baronies
Baronets	Baronetcies
En, Ire, NS, GB, UK (extinct)

This is a list of baronetcies in the Baronetage of the United Kingdom. They have been created since 1801 when they replaced the baronetages in the Baronetage of Great Britain, and Baronetage of Ireland. This list is not currently complete.

Title	Date of creation	Surname	Current status	Notes
Paget of Cranmore Hall	1886	Paget	extant	
Paget of Harewood Place	1871	Paget	extant	
Paget of Sutton Bonington	1897	Paget	extinct 1936	
Pakington	1846	Pakington	extant	first Baronet created Baron Hampton in 1874; baronetcy unproven (6th baronet died 2003)
Palmer-Acland of Fairfield	1818	Palmer-Acland, Fuller-Palmer-Acland	extinct 1871	
Palmer of Grinkle Park	1886	Palmer	extant	
Palmer of Reading and Grosvenor Square	1904	Palmer	extinct 1910	
Palmer of Reading	1916	Palmer	extant	first Baronet created Baron Palmer in 1933
Parker of Carlton House Terrace	1915	Palmer	extinct 1932	
Parker of Shenstone	1844	Parker	extant	
Parry of Highnam Court	1902	Parry	extinct 1918	
Parsons of Winton Lodge	1918	Parsons	extinct 1940	
Paul of Rodborough	1821	Paul	extinct 1972	
Paulet of West Hill	1836	Paulet	extinct 1886	
Pauncefort-Duncombe of Great Brickhill	1859	Pauncefort-Duncombe	extant	
Paxton of Letham	1923	Paxton	extinct 1930	Lord Provost of Glasgow
Payne-Gallwey of Hampton Hill	1812	Payne-Gallwey	extinct 2008	
Peacocke of Barntic	1802	Peacocke	extinct 1876	
Pearce of Cardell	1887	Pearce	extinct 1907	
Pearson of Cowdray	1894	Pearson	extant	first Baronet created Viscount Cowdray in 1917
Pearson of Gressingham	1964	Pearson	extant	
Pearson of St Dunstans	1916	Pearson	extinct 1982	
Pease of Hammersknott	1920	Pease	extant	
Pease of Hutton Lowcross	1882	Pease	extant	
Peek of Rousdon	1874	Peek	extant	
Peel of Eyworth	1936	Peel	extinct 1938	
Peel of Tyersall Hall	1897	Peel	extinct 1911	
Pelly of Upton	1840	Pelly	extant	
Pender of Thornby Hall	1897	Pender	extinct 1921	
Pennefather of Golden	1924	Pennefather	extinct 1933	
Penny of Singapore and Kingston upon Thames	1933	Penny	extant	first Baronet created Viscount Marchwood in 1945
Pepys of London	1801	Pepys	extant	second Baronet created Earl of Cottenham in 1850; in 1849 he also succeeded to the Pepys Baronetcy of Juniper Hill (created in 1784)
Perks of Wykham Park	1908	Perks	extinct 1979	
Perring of Frensham Manor	1963	Perringham	extant	Lord Mayor of London
Perring of Membland	1808	Perring	extinct 1920	
Perrott of Plumstead	1911	Perrott	extinct 1922	first Baronet had already succeeded to the Perrott Baronetcy of Plumstead (created in the Baronetage of Great Britain in 1716), which title also became extinct in 1922.
Petit of Petit Hall	1890	Petit	extant	
Peto of Barnstaple	1927	Peto	extant	
Peto of Somerleyton Hall and Kensington Palace Gardens	1855	Peto	extant	
Petrie of Carrowcarden	1918	Petrie	extant	
Philipps of Llanstephan	1919	Philipps	extant	first Baronet created Baron Milford in 1939
Philipps of Picton Castle and Kilgetty Park	1828	Philipps	extinct 1857	first Baronet created Baron Milford in 1847
Philipps of Picton Castle	1887	Philipps	extinct 1962	
Philips of Weston and Sedgley	1828	Philips	extinct 1883	
Philipson-Stow of Cape Town and Blackdown House	1907	Philipson-Stow	extant	
Phillimore of Shiplake	1881	Phillimore	extant	second Baronet created Baron Phillimore in 1918
Phillipps of Middle Hall	1821	Philipps	extinct 1872	
Phillips of Tylney Hall	1912	Phillips	extant	
Pickthorn of Orford	1959	Pickthorn	extant	
Pigott of Knapton	1808	Pigott	extant	
Pilditch of Bartropps	1929	Pilditch	extant	
Pile of Chipperfield	1900	Pile	extant	Lord Mayor of Dublin;
Pinsent of Selly Hill	1938	Pinsent	extant	
Pirie of Camberwell	1842	Pirie	extinct 1851	Lord Mayor of London
Platt of Grindleford	1959	Platt	extant	President of the Royal College of Physicians; first Baronet created a life peer as Baron Platt in 1967, which title became extinct in 1978; unproven (second Baronet died 2000) - under review
Platt of Rusholme	1958	Platt	dormant	first Baronet died 1986
Plender of Ovenden	1923	Plender	extinct 1946	first Baronet created Baron Plender in 1931
Pocock of Hart and Twickenham	1821	Pocock	extinct 1921	
Poë of Heywood	1912	Poë, Poë-Domvile	extinct 1959	
Pole of the Navy	1801	Pole	extinct 1830	
Pollock of Edinburgh	1939	Pollock	extinct 1962	
Pollock of Hanworth	1922	Pollock	extant	first Baronet created Viscount Hanworth in 1936
Pollock of Hatton	1866	Pollock	extant	
Pollock of the Khyber Pass	1872	Pollock, Pollock-Montagu	extant	
Ponsonby of Wotton	1956	Ponsonby	extant	
Pooley of Westbrook House	1953	Pooley	extinct 1966	
Porritt of Hampstead	1963	Porritt	dormant	first Baronet created a life peer as Baron Porritt in 1973, which title became extinct in 1994; first Baronet died 1994
Portal of Laverstoke House	1901	Portal	extant	third Baronet created Viscount Portal in 1945, which title became extinct in 1949
Porter of Frimley	1889	Porter	extinct 1974	
Pottinger of Richmond	1840	Pottinger	extinct 1909	
Pound of Stanmore	1905	Pound	extant	Lord Mayor of London
Powell of Diss	1897	Powell	extant	
Powell of Horton Old Hall	1892	Powell	extinct 1911	
Power of Edermine	1841	Power	extinct 1930	
Power of Kilfane	1836	Power	dormant	seventh Baronet died 1928
Power of Newlands Manor	1924	Powlands	extant	
Poynter of Albert Gate	1902	Poynter	extinct 1968	
Prescott of Godmanchester	1938	Prescott	extant	
Preston of Beeston St Lawrence	1815	Preston	extant	unproven (seventh Baronet died 1999) - under review
Prevost of Belmont	1805	Prevost	extant	
Prevost of Westbourne Terrace	1903	Prevost	extinct 1913	
Price of Ardingley	1953	Price	extinct 1963	
Price of Foxley	1828	Price	extinct 1857	
Price of Spring Grove	1804	Price, Rugge-Price	extant	Lord Mayor of London
Price of Trengwainton	1815	Price	extant	
Prichard-Jones of Bron Menai	1910	Prichard-Jones	extant	
Priestman of Monkwearmouth	1934	Priestman	extinct 1941	
Primrose of Redholme	1903	Primrose	extant	Lord Provost of Glasgow
Prince-Smith of Hillbrook	1911	Prince-Smith	extinct 2007	
Proby of Elton Hall	1952	Proby	extant	
Pryce-Jones of Dolerw	1918	Pryce-Jones	extinct 1963	
Pryke of Wanstead	1926	Pryke	extant	Lord Mayor of London
Pryse of Gogerddan	1866	Pryse, Webley-Parry-Pryse, Saunders-Pryse	extinct 1962	
Puleston of Emral	1813	Puleston	extinct 1896	
Pulley of Lower Eaton and Piccadilly	1893	Pulley	extinct 1901	
Pybus of Harwick	1934	Pybus	extinct 1935	
Pye of Hone|1665	Pye	Dormant since 1734	Baronetcies of Leckhampstead and Hone, Lord of Clifton	
Quain of Harley Street and Carrigoon	1891	Quain	extinct 1898	
Quilter of Bawdsey Manor	1897	Quilter	extant	
