= Sir John Hutton Cooper, 1st Baronet =

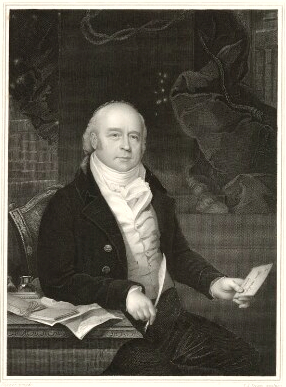
John Hutton Cooper

Escutcheon of the Cooper baronets of Walcot

Sir John Hutton Cooper, 1st Baronet (1765–1828) was an English medical doctor, courtier and politician. In 1819 he was elected a Fellow of the Royal Society.

== Life ==
He was the fifth son of Benjamin Cooper (1733–1797) of Sleaford and his first wife Anne Lomax (died 1765); his father was an apothecary in Sleaford. At the time of his first marriage in 1790 he was described as a surgeon. He took a medical degree at the University of St Andrews, and was admitted a Fellow of the Royal College of Physicians of Edinburgh, in 1796. His father remarried in 1767, to Grace Francis, daughter of the Rev. Wyatt Francis. Cooper's younger half-brother Christopher took a medical degree at Glasgow University in 1799.

Cooper was appointed Groom of the Bedchamber to the Duke of Clarence in 1812, a position he held for the rest of his life. William Beattie, attending the Duke in Brussels in 1822, recorded a courtesy call on the Duke by Cooper and Augustin Sayer. He wrote that Cooper "is evidently a great and privileged favourite with the Duke."

In 1825 Cooper was elected, unopposed, to Parliament for Dartmouth in 1825 at a by-election after the death by suicide of James Hamilton Stanhope. He then held the seat in the 1826 general election with the support of the Holdsworth interest, on a show of hands. In the House of Commons he voted against Catholic relief, but made little contribution to debates. He was created a baronet on 19 February 1828 and died on 24 December of that year. He was three times married, having a son by the first marriage, but left no heir.

== Family ==
Cooper was married three times. He met his first wife Elizabeth Mary Ellis (died 1793), through his sister Theodosia, the eldest of the children of Benjamin and Ann Cooper, and they were married in 1790. She was the daughter of Edward Ellis of Alnwick, Northumberland. The couple had one son, Edward Moore, who was born and died in 1791. The marriage was carried out by Cooper's brother the Rev. William (a graduate of Clare College, Cambridge, at that point vicar of Marnham, died 1797, when he was rector of Hardingham). A connection of Cooper to the Moore family, children of the Rev. Williamson Moore of Carlton Scroop west of Sleaford, was marked in 1793 when Cooper paid for a monument to the daughter Elizabeth Lomax in St Denys' Church, Sleaford, next to one for her brother Edward (died 1784). Williamson Moore's son the Rev. Thomas was father of Frances Brooke and Theodosia was connected socially to the Brookes.

Admiral Arthur Phillip was a patient of Cooper's, around 1794. The merchant Henry Chapman, a personal friend of Phillip, was married to Christina Neate, daughter of William Neate, and sister of the widowed Phillis Meniconi née Neate who became Cooper's second wife in 1797. Cooper became by this marriage uncle to Fanny Chapman the diarist, who was the daughter of Henry and Kitty (i.e. Christiana or Christiania) Chapman.

The couple had no children, and Phillis died in 1801. On Phillis's death, Cooper inherited Batheaston Villa.

In 1821 Cooper married a third time, to Maria Charlotte Baker, daughter of Sir George Baker, 1st Baronet. The couple had no children.

=== Lister estate ===
Cooper became in 1806 heir-at-law of Frances Newton née Lister, daughter of William Lister of Coleby Hall, High Sheriff of Lincolnshire in 1669. While he was the youngest of five sons of his father's first marriage, the eldest William (above) died in 1797, and the others died young.

The point came up after the death in 1806 of the widow Elizabeth of Thomas Scrope of Coleby Hall. The bulk of the former Lister estates went to Stephen Tempest, descended from Henry Scrope, 6th Baron Scrope of Bolton, but Cooper was one of three co-heirs to the remainder. Cooper's paternal grandmother (as inferred by Maddison, working from research on Lincolnshire pedigrees by Arthur Staunton Larken and William Monson, 6th Baron Monson) was Elizabeth Newton, daughter of Frances Newton. He was grandson of the Rev. Benjamin Cooper (died 1741), a Cambridge graduate, rector of Kilvington and then North Scarle.

=== George Ewbank ===
Through the Duke of Clarence, Cooper found for his nephew George Ewbank, son of the Rev. William Ewbank and Theodosia Cooper, a commission in the Royal Navy.

In 1836 Ewbank married at Camberwell Elizabeth Bryan Lucas, fifth daughter of the late Jonathan Lucas II of South Carolina, son of Jonathan Lucas I (c.1754–1821) from Cumberland, the rice mill inventor. The couple's children included George Ewbank (1839–1885) and the Rev. Christopher Cooper Ewbank (1845–1933). Jonathan Lucas II had died in 1832. George's brother Henry Ewbank had married Elizabeth's sister Lydia Ball Lucas at Deptford in 1827; he was a merchant in Liverpool who had earlier been a partner in a Charleston rice mill of the Lucas family. They lived for a period to 1842 in Denmark Hill, Camberwell. The couple later moved to South Carolina.

After the marriage, Ewbank resigned from his Navy commission, with rank of lieutenant. He and Lydia then spent a period in India. Ewbank entered Queens' College, Cambridge in 1843 as a mature student, moving the following year to Caius College. He subsequently took holy orders and lived in Brighton, where he ran a school.

== Notes ==
Baronetage of the United Kingdom
Preceded by Doyle baronets	Cooper baronets of Walcot; 19 February 1828	Succeeded by Wakeham baronets
