= Global Initiative for Emergency and Essential Surgical Care =

World Health Organization initiative (2005)

The Global Initiative for Emergency and Essential Surgical Care was established by the World Health Organization in December 2005. Its general purpose is to reduce "death and disability from road traffic accidents, trauma, burns, falls, pregnancy related complications, domestic violence, disasters and other emergency surgical conditions" by improving collaborations between relevant organizations, institutions, and agencies ("Global Initiative for Essential and Emergency Surgical Health Care" or GIEESC). Specific objectives include improving basic medical supplies at district hospitals, as well as better training for staff to bolster medical standards and care. Since its inception, GIEESC has grown to include over 2300 members from 140 countries which collaborates to share knowledge, advise policy formation and develop educational resources to reduce the burden of death and disability from conditions that could be treated through surgery.

== Establishment ==
The GIEESC is a partnership of organizations, NGO’s, institutions, and associations from third and first world countries. This partnership is working together to create solutions to and meet the Millennium Development Goals developed by the WHO—which include reducing maternal and child mortality rates, as well as reducing HIV rates—“through improvement in the quality and safety of clinical procedures (essential surgical and anaesthesia care)” ("Global Initiative").

=== Creation ===
The Clinical Procedures Unit of the WHO recognized a need for improved surgical care at the first referral-level health facilities, which typically are district hospitals. The "WHO Meeting towards A Global Initiative for Emergency and Essential Surgical Care" at the WHO headquarters in Geneva, Switzerland, established the GIEESC to "improve emergency and essential surgical care at resource limited health care facilities". Experts from the fields of surgery, anesthesia, trauma, and others were in attendance to discuss solutions to the global problem.

The first countries to benefit from the creation of GIEESC were Pakistan, Maldives, Mongolia, Vietnam, Mozambique, Ethiopia, Ghana, and Kyrgyzstan. Other countries may join upon request and a submitted proposal. The training program implemented at district hospitals to achieve the project's goals includes a tool kit of "best practice protocols on clinical procedures safety, disaster management, HIV prevention, waste disposal, guidelines on policies, training curriculum, emergency equipment, teaching slides and videos”(“WHO Meeting”).

=== Mission statement ===
GIEESC's stated goals include: improving the already existing training and education programs essential to executing emergency surgical care; developing district hospitals' surgical, obstetric, trauma, and anesthesia services; training personnel with the appropriate skills to treat patients; continuing education to maintain those skills; and finally, developing a dependable system that facilitates access to medication and medicinal drugs.

=== Challenges ===
Challenges to those goals include: inadequate equipment to "perform simple but vital interventions such as resuscitation, the provision of oxygen, assessment of anemia, suctions, intercostal drainage and airway support"; insufficient basic supplies; the absence of specialized surgical teams; and the lack of anesthesia.

== Strategies and Implementation ==
=== Policies ===
GIEESC's policies require implementing a national plan to standardize district hospitals' surgical services by including requirements for basic surgical treatment. Hospitals must be clearly committed to educating and training health care professionals to react appropriately when dealing with surgery, trauma, obstetrics and anesthesia.

=== Quality and safety ===
GIEESC demands national guidelines on standards for personnel, standard operating procedures, and evaluations, based on quality of actual procedures and equipment involved.

=== Tool kit ===
The "Integrated Management for Emergency and Essential Surgical Care (IMEESC) tool kit" for implementing procedures involves a set of five cds containing recommendations for standards in emergency surgical care in surgery, trauma, obstetrics, and anesthesia.

== Country reports ==
September 24–25, 2007, in Dar es Salaam, Tanzania, the WHO held a second meeting on the initiative to discuss its progress in certain countries. The findings are listed below by continent, and then country.

=== Africa ===
==== Tanzania ====
There were 36 million inhabitants but only 100 surgeons, and 1/3 of them had left the country. The GIEESC project started in January 2007 organized a task force to train twenty health care providers (with at least one from nine different zones) in dilation, curettage, cesarean section, and trauma management. There will be a follow-up report in a year to evaluate the education the trainers brought to their respective zones.

==== Ethiopia ====
With a population of over 75 million, Ethiopia had only 144 surgeons, 31 anesthesiologists, 254 anesthesia nurses, 1124 general practitioners, 776 health officers, and 18,000 nurses. The initiative had reached only one region so far, with 9 health officers and 18 nurse anesthetists trained. By 2010 the goal was to have trained 300 general practitioners, 600 nurse anesthetists, and 300 midwives. Additionally, four medical colleges are including training materials in their curriculum.

==== Gambia ====
Gambia lacked sufficient staff and equipment to treat its population of 1.5 million to proper surgical care. The program was focused on training nurses in child and maternal health care, with the help of an emergency obstetrical flying squad. In the first two months of implementation 27 lives were saved.

==== Ghana ====
A mycobacterial skin disease occurring primarily in children under 15 years old prompted the Buruli Ulcer program, which provided education on the treatment of the ulcers that result from the skin disease. Equipment for safe surgery, as well as refurbished health facilities were ongoing challenges.

==== Mozambique ====
The GIEESC had been holding courses on disaster management and polytrauma, as well as a workshop for surgical technicians, and the founding of the National Program for Infection Control.

==== Uganda ====
Plans for Uganda involved implementing better care to lower levels of health facilities, and providing training and surgical services to camps in rural areas.

==== Zambia ====
Challenges to proper surgical care in Zambia included lack of staff, poor infrastructure, inadequate supplies, and difficulty in accessing health care. A situational analysis was underway.

==== Cote d'Ivoire ====
Temporary surgical units in rural health centers have been set up, along with training of doctors there(“WHO Meeting").

=== Asia ===
==== Mongolia ====
Various steps had been taken to improve Mongolia’s emergency surgical care: the training of 300 primary health workers at main hospitals and 120 workers at primary health facilities, the translation of necessary WHO tools into Mongolian.

==== India ====
The GIEESC’s two goals for India were to train existing professionals in life saving skills, and to implement a “rural surgery” project where surgeons would be trained to deal with specific surgical problems seen in rural areas.

==== Kyrgyzstan ====
The country’s government was implementing health care reform by focusing on surgery, and a WHO toolkit was to be implemented at medical institutions to help.

=== Middle East ===
==== Afghanistan ====
GIEESC had begun anesthesia training at sites in Faryab and Mazir-I Sharif, and equipment was donated for the purpose.

=== South America ===
==== Guyana ====
The country’s health care budget was being redirected toward training of health care providers at basic facilities with surgical capabilities, with essential and emergency surgical care education central to the project.

=== Other initiatives ===
The GIEESC was involved in various collaborations with other WHO departments: Transplantation, Health Action in Crises, Violence and Injury Prevention, Making Pregnancy Safer, Child and Adolescent Health, The Partnership for Maternal, Newborn, and Child Health, Communicable Diseases, Second Global Patient Safety Challenge: Safe Surgery Saves Lives, Health Inter Network Access to Research Initiative, Knowledge Management for Public Health, and the Clinical Procedures Unit. The GIEESC was also involved in global partnerships with: The Transplantation Society, Medecins Sans Frontiers, International Committee of the Red Cross, International Society of Orthopedic Surgery and Traumatology, Health Volunteers Overseas, Association of Surgeons of East Africa, College of Surgeons of East, Central and South Africa, International Federation of Surgical Colleges, International College of Surgeons, World Federation of Societies of Anesthesiologists, Geneva Foundation for Medical Education and Research, EHT-ESC WHO/UNICEF Statement on Anemia, and the Canadian Network for International Surgery.
