= Phelipps baronets =

Extinct baronetcy in the Baronetage of England

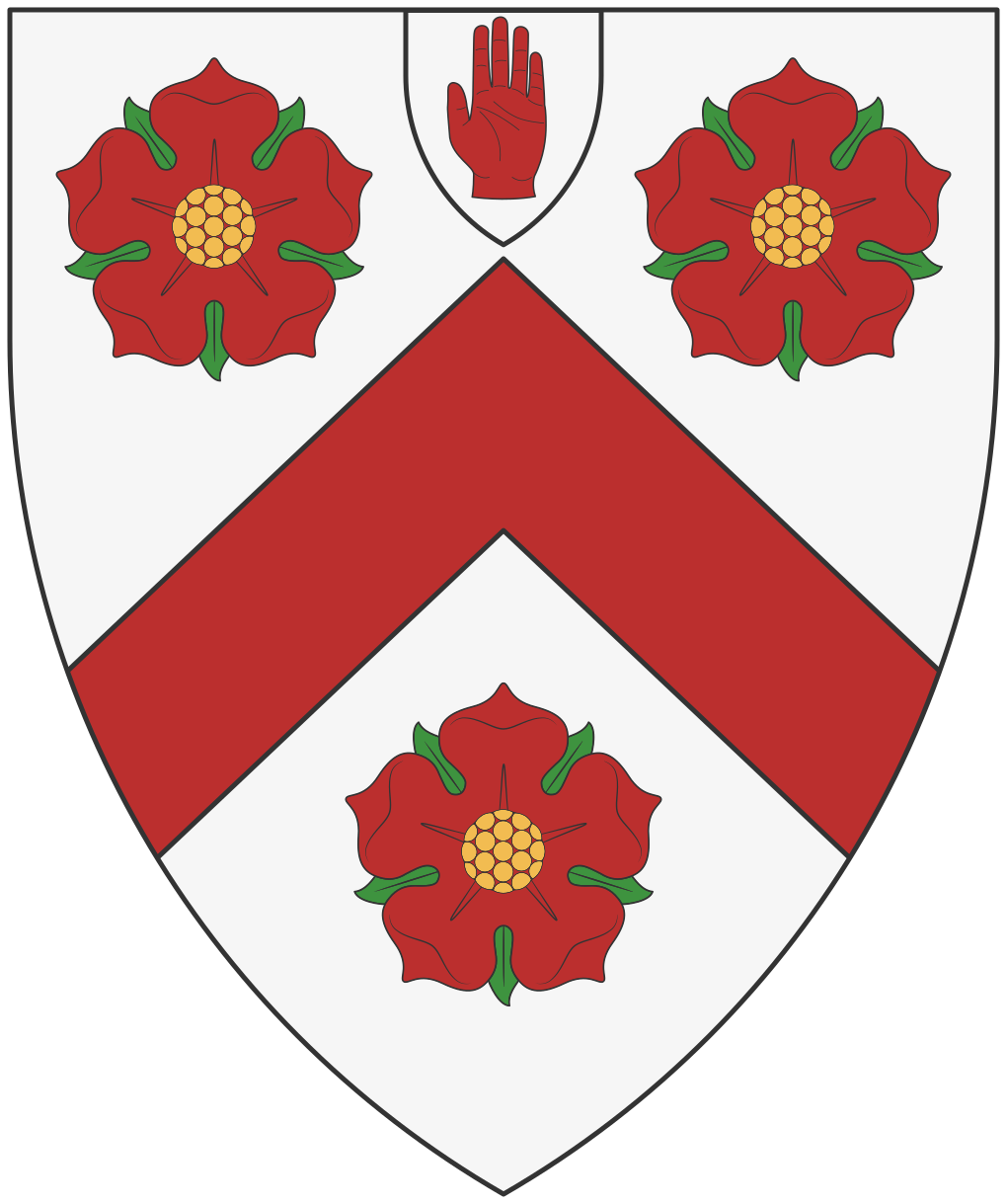
The coat of arms of the Phelips baronets.

The Phelipps Baronetcy, of Barrington in the County of Somerset, was a title in the Baronetage of England. It was created on 16 February 1620 for Thomas Phelipps, later Member of Parliament for Winchester. The title became extinct on the death of the fourth Baronet in 1690.

== Phelipps baronets, of Barrington (1620) ==
- Sir Thomas Phelipps, 1st Baronet (1590–1627)
- Sir Thomas Phelipps, 2nd Baronet (1621–1644)
- Sir James Phelipps, 3rd Baronet (c. 1625-1652)
- Sir James Phelipps, 4th Baronet (1650–1690)

== See also ==
- Philipps baronets
- Philips baronets
- Philipson-Stow baronets
- Phillipps baronets
- Phillips baronets
