= George Albu (disambiguation) =

George Albu (1857–1935) was a mining magnate.

George Albu may also refer to:

- Sir George Werner Albu, 2nd Baronet (1905–1963) of the Albu baronets
- Sir George Albu, 3rd Baronet (born 1944) of the Albu baronets

== See also ==
- Albu (surname)
