= Wakeman baronets =

Set index for Wakeman baronets

There have been two baronetcies created for persons with the surname Wakeman, one in the Baronetage of England and one in the Baronetage of the United Kingdom. Both are extinct.

- Wakeman baronets of Beckford (1661): see Sir George Wakeman, 1st Baronet (died c. 1690)
- Wakeman baronets of Perdiswell Hall (1828)
