= Harry Platt =

English orthopaedic surgeon

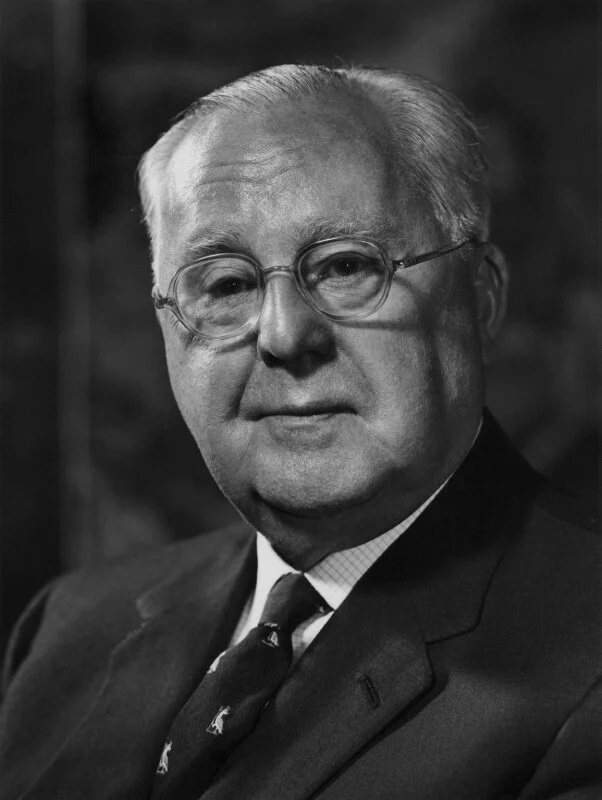
The president of SICOT, Sir Harry Platt.

Sir Harry Platt, 1st Baronet, FRCS, KStJ (7 October 1886 – 20 December 1986) was an English orthopaedic surgeon, president of the Royal College of Surgeons of England (1954–1957). He was a founder of the British Orthopaedic Association, of which he became president in 1934–1935.

== Early life and education ==
He was born in Thornham, Royton, Lancashire, the son of Ernest Platt, a velvet cutter and later chairman of United Velvet Cutters, Ltd. Harry developed a tuberculous knee as a child and his early education was at home. He entered the Victoria University of Manchester to study medicine and qualified in 1909 from both Victoria and London Universities. After resident and registrar appointments he demonstrated anatomy at Manchester Royal Infirmary. His orthopaedic training was mainly at the Royal National Orthopaedic Hospital in London, and in Boston, USA.

== Work ==
On his return to England in 1914, he was appointed surgeon at Ancoats Hospital but on the outbreak of World War I he was appointed to be surgeon-in-charge of a military orthopaedic centre in Manchester as a captain in the Royal Army Medical Corps.

By 1932, his posts included being senior honorary surgeon and surgeon-in-charge of the orthopaedic service, Ancoats Hospital, as consulting orthopaedic surgeon for Lancashire County Council and in 1939 he advanced on his earlier status as a clinical lecturer in orthopaedic surgery at the University of Manchester when he was appointed professor.

Platt was a specialist in the congenital dislocation of the hip and peripheral nerve injuries.

During World War II, he was an advisor to the Emergency Medical Service.

Platt was President of the Société Internationale de Chirurgie Orthopédique from 1949 to 1954.

Platt was elected to the Council of the Royal College of Surgeons in 1940, serving there for eighteen years. He was elected vice-president in 1949–1950 and president 1954–1957. He was the first orthopaedic expert to be president. He campaigned for the creation of the International Federation of Surgical Colleges, which was created in 1958.

=== Reports ===
==== Platt Report on The Welfare of Children in Hospital ====
In 1959, Platt produced the Platt Report on 'The Welfare of Children in Hospital', which encouraged hospitals to permit parents to visit and care for their children in hospital much more than had previously been allowed. This was the result of a three-year enquiry by a committee set up to investigate the welfare of children in hospital, as opposed to their medical needs. Before this time parental visiting was commonly limited to just a couple of hours a week.

==== Platt Report on the Reform of Nursing Education ====
In 1964 and 1965 he produced the 'Platt Report(s) on the Reform of Nursing Education'. He had established a committee in 1961 to consider all aspects of nursing education and to make recommendations. He created groups to look at: a) The Place and Functions of the Nurse in the Modern Community, b) Preparation of the Student Nurse for Registration and of the Pupil Nurse for Enrolment: the Organisation of the School of Nursing, c) Preparation for Entry to Nursing. Committee members included Annie Altschul, Barbara Fawkes, Catherine Hall (nurse), and Winifred Hector.

== Death and legacy ==
He died in 1986 at the age of 100.

Platt had been much influenced by the work of Robert Jones in Liverpool and by his training in the US. He continued to be inspired by US methods for medical training and organisation. Among those whom he influenced in turn was John Charnley.

== Awards and honours ==
Platt was elected to the membership of Manchester Literary and Philosophical Society on 1 November 1946.

Platt became a Knight Bachelor in 1948. He was invited to deliver the Bradshaw Lecture to the Royal College of surgeons in 1950, which he made on the subject of bone sarcomas.

Platt was made a baronet in 1958, on completing his term as President of the Royal College of Surgeons. He was appointed a Knight of the Most Venerable Order of the Hospital of St. John of Jerusalem (KStJ) in February 1972.

== See also ==
- Platt baronets

== External resources ==
- Harry Platt Papers at the University of Manchester Library

Baronetage of the United Kingdom
New creation	Baronet (of Rusholme); 1958–1986	Succeeded by Lindsey Platt
