= Dhurali =

Dhurali (Village ID 39201) is a place situated in Mohali district of Punjab in India The PIN code of village is 140306 and is now known as Sector 101, Chandigarh as it is coming in the list of sectors to be newly constructed. There is a government middle school in the village and two more private schools. The village has a gurduara sahib and a dispensary.

According to the 2011 census it has a population of 2128 living in 385 households. Its main agriculture product is wheat.
