= Phillips baronets =

Extinct baronetcy in the Baronetage of the United Kingdom

Escutcheon of the Phillips baronets of Tylney Hall

The Phillips baronetcy, of Tylney Hall, Hampshire, was a title in the Baronetage of the United Kingdom. It was created for the mining financier Lionel Phillips on 10 February 1912, for public work.

The title became extinct on the death in 2026 of the 3rd Baronet.

== Phillips baronets, of Tylney Hall (1912) ==
- Sir Lionel Phillips, 1st Baronet (6 August 1855 – 2 July 1936)
- Sir Lionel Francis Phillips, 2nd Baronet (9 March 1914 – 6 July 1944), killed in action.
- Sir Robin Francis Phillips, 3rd Baronet (29 July 1940 – 10 February 2026), left no heir.

== See also ==
- Phelipps baronets
- Philipps baronets
- Philips baronets
- Philipson-Stow baronets
- Phillipps baronets

Baronetage of the United Kingdom
Preceded by Skinner baronets	Phillips baronets of Tylney Hall; 9 February 1912	Succeeded by Albu baronets
