= Christopher Ewbank =

English cricketer

Personal information
- Full name: Christopher Cooper Ewbank
- Born: 10 March 1845; Cambridge, Cambridgeshire, England
- Died: 9 July 1933 (aged 88); Langford, Bedfordshire, England
- Batting: Right-handed
- Role: Occasional wicket-keeper
- Relatives: George Ewbank (brother)

Domestic team information
- Years: Team
- 1867–1879: Sussex
- 1866: Marylebone Cricket Club

Career statistics
Competition	First-class
Matches	4
Runs scored	95
Batting average	11.87
100s/50s	–/–
Top score	31
Balls bowled	–
Wickets	–
Bowling average	–
5 wickets in innings	–
10 wickets in match	–
Best bowling	–
Catches/stumpings	2/–
- Source: Cricinfo, 30 June 2012

Christopher Cooper Ewbank (10 March 1845 – 9 July 1933) was an English cricketer. Ewbank was a right-handed batsman who fielded occasionally as a wicket-keeper.

== Early life ==
He was born at Cambridge, the son of George Ewbank of Brighton. He matriculated at Clare College, Cambridge in 1863, graduating B.A. in 1867.

== Cricket ==
Ewbank made his first-class debut for the Marylebone Cricket Club against Sussex at the Royal Brunswick Ground, Brighton. In the Marylebone Cricket Club's first-innings, he was dismissed for a single run by James Lillywhite, while in their second-innings he was dismissed for 31 runs by Richard Fillery. The following season, he made two first-class appearances for Sussex, against the Marylebone Cricket Club at the Royal Brunswick Ground, and Surrey at The Oval. Twelve years later in 1879, he made a final first-class appearance for Sussex against the Marylebone Cricket Club at Lord's. In three first-class matches for the county, he scored 63 runs at an average of 10.50, with a high score of 23. His brother, George, also played first-class cricket.

== Career ==
Ewbank was the vicar of Langford, Bedfordshire, for 63 years from 1870 and died there on 9 July 1933.
