= Doyle baronets of Buscombe (1828) =

Escutcheon of the Doyle baronets of Buscombe

The Doyle baronetcy, of Buscombe, was created 18 February 1828 in the Baronetage of the United Kingdom for Lieutenant Colonel Francis Doyle. It became extinct in 1987.

== Doyle Baronets, of Buscombe (1828) ==
- Sir Francis Hastings Doyle, 1st Baronet (1783–1839)
- Sir Francis Hastings Charles Doyle, 2nd Baronet (1810–1888)
- Sir Everard Hastings Doyle, 3rd Baronet (1852–1933)
- Sir Arthur Havelock James Doyle, 4th Baronet (1858–1948)
- Sir John Francis Reginald William Hastings Doyle, 5th Baronet (1912–1987)

== Notes ==
Baronetage of the United Kingdom
Preceded by Philipps baronets	Doyle baronets of Buscombe; 18 February 1828	Succeeded by Cooper baronets
