= Frances Goodall =

British nurse (1893–1976)

- fair use from RCN archives
- Born: 8 December 1893; Dulwich, London, England
- Died: 22 July 1976 (aged 82); Royal Free Hospital, Hampstead, London, England
- Successor: Catherine Mary Hall

Frances Goodall CBE (8 December 1893 – 22 July 1976) was a British nurse who was General Secretary of the Royal College of Nursing and a founder of what became the Colostomy Association.

== Personal life and career ==
Goodall was born in Dulwich in 1893 into a well off household. She was educated at home with her two brothers. Her family were in the medical profession and seeing her uncle at work made her decide to be a nurse. She spent two years teaching at Camden High School for Girls but then joined Guy's Hospital as a trainee nurse where her three uncles had also trained. She served in several roles as a sister before specialising in the treatment of eyes. Her posts included at Freemason’s Hospital, Lewisham Hospital, the Royal London Ophthalmic Hospital and at Guy's Hospital.

In 1928 she became the Assistant General Secretary of the College of Nursing, which was established with a Royal Charter that year.

In 1935 Goodall became College of Nursing's General Secretary when the Trades Union Congress promoted a Bill to secure a 48-hour working week for all hospital employees. The College opposed this and was accused by the TUC of being "an organisation of voluntary snobs". One of her first tasks was to prepare evidence for the Athlone Committee which reported to Government in 1939. From 1941 Goodall sat on the Rushcliffe Nurses Salaries Committee. From 1943 she was a member of the Ministry of Labour’s National Advisory Council for the Recruitment and Distribution of Nurses and Midwives. In 1947 she was a member of the Ministry of Labour's Women’s Consultative Committee. In 1948 the National Health Service was created and she sat on the Joint industrial council which was the formal meeting of the nurses with their new employees. Her organisation got on well with Aneurin Bevan and welcomed the NHS at a time when the doctor's organisation was not in favour of the change. In 1949 Miss Goodall was invited by the Ministry of Health to serve, in addition to the College’s official nominees, on the Standing Advisory Committee on Nursing of the Central Health Services Council. She was Secretary of the Staff Side of the Nurses and Midwives Whitley Council and in 1956 became the Staff Side Chair. She was a member of the central council and of the executive committee of the Federated Superannuation Scheme for Nurses and Hospital Officers.

She retired from her role as General Secretary in 1957 and she was succeeded by Catherine Mary Hall.

Goodall held other voluntary roles including, from 1943 Honorary Secretary, Women’s Advisory Council of the Nuffield Provincial Hospitals Trust (working under Priscilla Norman); and from 1943 elected Chair of the British Federation of Business and Professional Women (of which she was later President). In 1956 the Society of Registered Male Nurses made her an honorary member in appreciation of her support and advice.

In 1967 she was a founder of the Colostomy Welfare Group with Gertrude Swithenbank. This would become the Colostomy Association.

She was awarded an OBE in 1944 and in 1953 she was awarded a CBE.

Goodall died in the Royal Free Hospital in 1976.
