= Albu (surname) =

Albu is a surname. Notable people with the surname include:

- Austen Albu (1903–1994), British politician
- Emily Albu (born 1945), American classics scholar
- Florența Albu (1934–2000), Romanian poet
- George Albu (1857–1935), mining magnate in the diamond and gold industries of South Africa
- Gheorghe Albu (1909–1974), Romanian football player

== See also ==
- Albu baronets, a title in the Baronetage of the United Kingdom
