= Hannah Brackenbury =

English philanthropist

Hannah Brackenbury (1795–1873) was an English philanthropist. She was unmarried and had inherited wealth from James Brackenbury, a solicitor from Manchester, England, who had made money through involvement with the Lancashire and Yorkshire Railway. Sources differ regarding whether James was her father or brother. Believing herself to be the last of the Brackenbury line, which she thought could be traced to Perse Brackenbury, who had married into the family of John Balliol around 1086 AD, she elected to engage in philanthropic endeavours in spheres that had connections to her relatives.

Between 1865 and 1867, Brackenbury donated money to Balliol College at Oxford University to fund scholarships in history and natural sciences and to enable the construction of new buildings. The Brackenbury Scholarship at Balliol is funded to this day from her bequest and some of the buildings are named after the family. She had a brother, Ralph, who had been a doctor and scholarships in the Brackenbury name were also created at the College Hall of St. Bartholomew's Hospital. She was also a benefactor of Manchester Medical School. and Ancoats Hospital, Manchester.

It is uncertain whether the Ancoats benefaction was a gift or a bequest. At her death, in Brighton, she bequeathed £6,600 to the Manchester Grammar School, £12,500 to Owen's College, Manchester and £9,000 to the University of Durham.
