= Colostomy Association =

British health charity

- Founded: 1967 and 2005
- Type: Charity
- Purpose: Patient support, advocacy, information, health
- Headquarters: Reading, United Kingdom
- Region served: United Kingdom
- Website: www.colostomyassociation.org.uk
- Formerly called: British Colostomy Association

The Colostomy Association is a British health charity that began in 1967 as the Colostomy Welfare Group. It became the Colostomy Association in 2005. Its goal is to represent the interests of people with a colostomy through providing support, information and raising awareness of life with a stoma.

== History ==
The predecessor of the Colostomy Association was the Colostomy Welfare Group, formed in 1967 by Frances Goodall and Gertrude Swithenbank. It following a pilot survey to find out if there was need for a national service for colostomates in the United Kingdom.

The Colostomy Welfare Group was later rebranded in 1989 as the 'British Colostomy Association' and in the following year moved its headquarters to Reading, Berkshire.

Following the withdrawal of financial support from Macmillan Cancer Relief in 2004 new trustees were sought and the British Colostomy Association is replaced by the Colostomy Association - an entirely self-funded charity.

== Services ==
The Colostomy Association provides a number of services to fulfill its role of representing the interests of people with a colostomy. It runs a 24/7 confidential helpline. The Colostomy Association has over 100 trained volunteers who provide emotional support to stoma patients before and after surgery.

The Colostomy Association also produces a range of free advisory literature written by members and nursing professionals. The Association's quarterly magazine, 'Tidings', is written for the ostomate community and had a readership of over 50,000 people. In 2015, the Colostomy Association launched, Stoma Aid, to ship surplus ostomy supplies from the UK to people in developing countries who cannot access stoma appliances.
