= Catherine Hall (nurse) =

British nurse and nursing administrator

Catherine Mary Hall DBE FRCN
- Born: 1922
- Died: 1996 (aged 73–74)
- Occupation: nurse
- Employer(s): Birmingham Children's Hospital, Leeds General Infirmary, Middlesex Hospital, Royal College of Nursing

Dame Catherine Mary Hall DBE FRCN (19 December 1922 – 26 August 1996) was a British nurse and nursing administrator who was a long serving General Secretary of the UK's Royal College of Nursing (1957–1982).

== Early life and education ==
Hall was born on 19 December 1922 in Sheffield, England. Her father was the chief constable in Rotherham, which is where she moved when she was still a child. Hall went to school at Hunmanby School for Girls at Filey, Yorkshire and then went on to study nursing at Leeds General Hospital.

== Nurse training and early career ==
Hall knew from the age of 14 that she wanted to be a nurse, but her parents were against this. It was after World War II broke out that she began her career at Birmingham Children's Hospital where she started her nurse training. Hall made the move from Birmingham to Leeds to be closer to her mother who had become ill. 1941-1944 Hall undertook nurse training at Leeds General Infirmary, registering as a nurse in June 1944. She then undertook Part 1 midwifery training at Leeds Maternity Hospital.

Hall interrupted her midwifery studies to become Ward Sister at Leeds General Infirmary where she was the youngest person to fill that role at age 22; she was responsible for a women’s surgical ward of 36 beds. She then completed Part 2 of her midwifery training at Moorgate General Hospital, Rotherham, returning to Leeds General Infirmary for various roles before becoming Night Superintendent in 1950 by age 28.

Hall was the first recipient of a travelling fellowship awarded by the United Leeds Hospitals' Board of Governors in 1950. She spent six months 1951-1952, studying nursing in Canada and the United States. Upon her return she became Assistant Matron at the Leeds General Infirmary. She was soon awarded another scholarship in 1954, this time by the Joint Committee of the Order of St. John and British Red Cross. Hall took the year long nursing administration (i.e. management) course at the Royal College of Nursing.

In 1954-1956 Hall was appointed Assistant Matron at the Middlesex Hospital.

== General Secretary of the Royal College of Nursing ==
The Royal College of Nursing had to advertise twice before appointing Hall in 1957 as its General Secretary, replacing Frances Goodall at the age of 34.

It was during Hall's time as General Secretary, and under her leadership, that the Royal College of Nursing (RCN) became a trade union in 1977 which she felt was an 'essential step'. Although Hall was opposed to industrial action, she publicly criticised the governments proposed 2.5% salary hike for nurses. After a confrontation with Enoch Powell, Conservative MP and Minister of Health, Hall negotiated a 7.5% increase. Another achievement during Hall's time as General Secretary was her support of the campaign to allow men to join the RCN and the registers were opened to them in 1960 with the lifting of the constitutional ban. The first man to become an RCN member was Albery Verdun Whittamore, chief male nurse at Horton Psychiatric Hospital. It was also during her time as General Secretary that Hall opened the nursing registers to enrolled nurses in 1969 and then a year later to student nurses. Hall's contribution to the RCN was to increase the membership from 30,000 to 200,000.

Hall served on many committees including between 1961 and 1963 the influential Platt Committee on Nursing Education for the RCN, led by Harry Platt which published as the Platt Report 1964.

Key roles included:

- Assistant Matron, Middlesex Hospital, London (1954-1956)
- General Secretary, Royal College of Nursing (1957-1982)
- Member, Commission on Industrial Relations (1971-1974)
- Member, General Medical Council (1979-1989)
- Chair, United Kingdom Central Council for Nursing, Midwifery and Health Visiting (1980-1985)
- Sat on the panel for the World Health Organization.

== Awards ==
- Commander of the Order of the British Empire (CBE), 1967 New Year Honours
- Honours, 1975 – From City University in 'recognition of her outstanding services in maintaining and developing the science, art, status, standards, practice and general recognition of the nursing profession'
- She was made a Fellow of the Royal College of Nursing in 1976
- Officer Sister of the Order of St John of Jerusalem (1977)
- Dame Commander of the Order of the British Empire (DBE), 1982 New Year Honours.
