= Dispensary movement in Manchester =

Movement to establish local health care

The foundation and development of dispensaries in Manchester, England, was notable during the nineteenth century. These organisations were intended to care for sick people and were a consequence of the rapid population growth, expansion in area and public health issues experienced by the city as it industrialised.

The Manchester Infirmary (MR) medical charity – then based in Piccadilly, Manchester — was struggling to cope with the rapid expansion of the city of Manchester by the early 19th century. The population was increasing significantly and was spreading widely into new industrial and residential suburbs, making it impractical for the hospital to expand its system of home visits for the care and treatment of patients. There was a proposal that branches should be established in outlying areas but, instead, those areas acquired independent facilities.

== Chorlton Dispensary ==
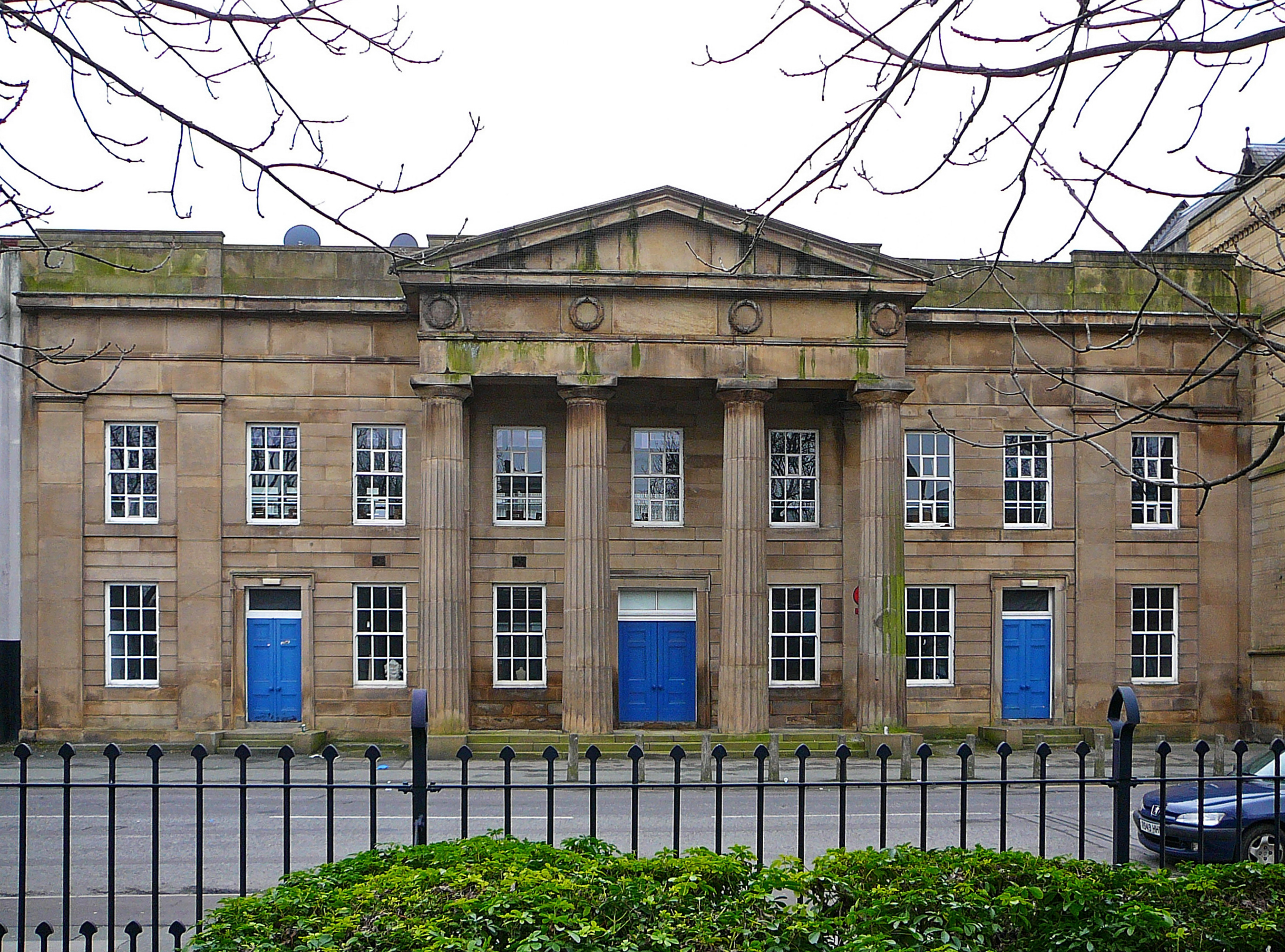
Chorlton-on-Medlock Town Hall

The first of these new Dispensaries opened in the township of Chorlton Row (now Chorlton-on-Medlock) around 1825, probably as a reaction to an epidemic of fever in that area at the time and with knowledge of a scheme that had been established in Blackburn one year earlier. There had been an appeal to the MR for help but it was unable to do so, for reasons relating to its own financial priorities and also staffing levels. Thus, the Chorlton Select Vestry, comprising all the major ratepayers of the area and responsible for the administration of the Poor Law, provided money to enable care for paupers who needed medical assistance. Funds were also provided by subscribers in return for their having the right to refer non-paupers to the institution. The Chorlton Dispensary was based in the newly constructed Chorlton-on-Medlock Town Hall from about 1832 and its first president was Hugh Hornby Birley (1778–1845), a significant owner of textile mills in the area.

== Salford and Pendleton Dispensary ==
The MR was unwilling to expand in 1827, when proposals for branches in Ancoats and Salford were raised. The independent Salford and Pendleton Dispensary was formed soon after under the presidency of a would-be Tory politician, and later High Sheriff of Lancashire, William Garnett (d. 1863). Construction of a building commenced in 1830 with the intent that it would house a small number of beds for inpatients as well as serving as a base for the Dispensary. Financial constraints caused a delay in the provision of the inpatient facilities, which did not appear until 1845.

== Ardwick and Ancoats Dispensary ==
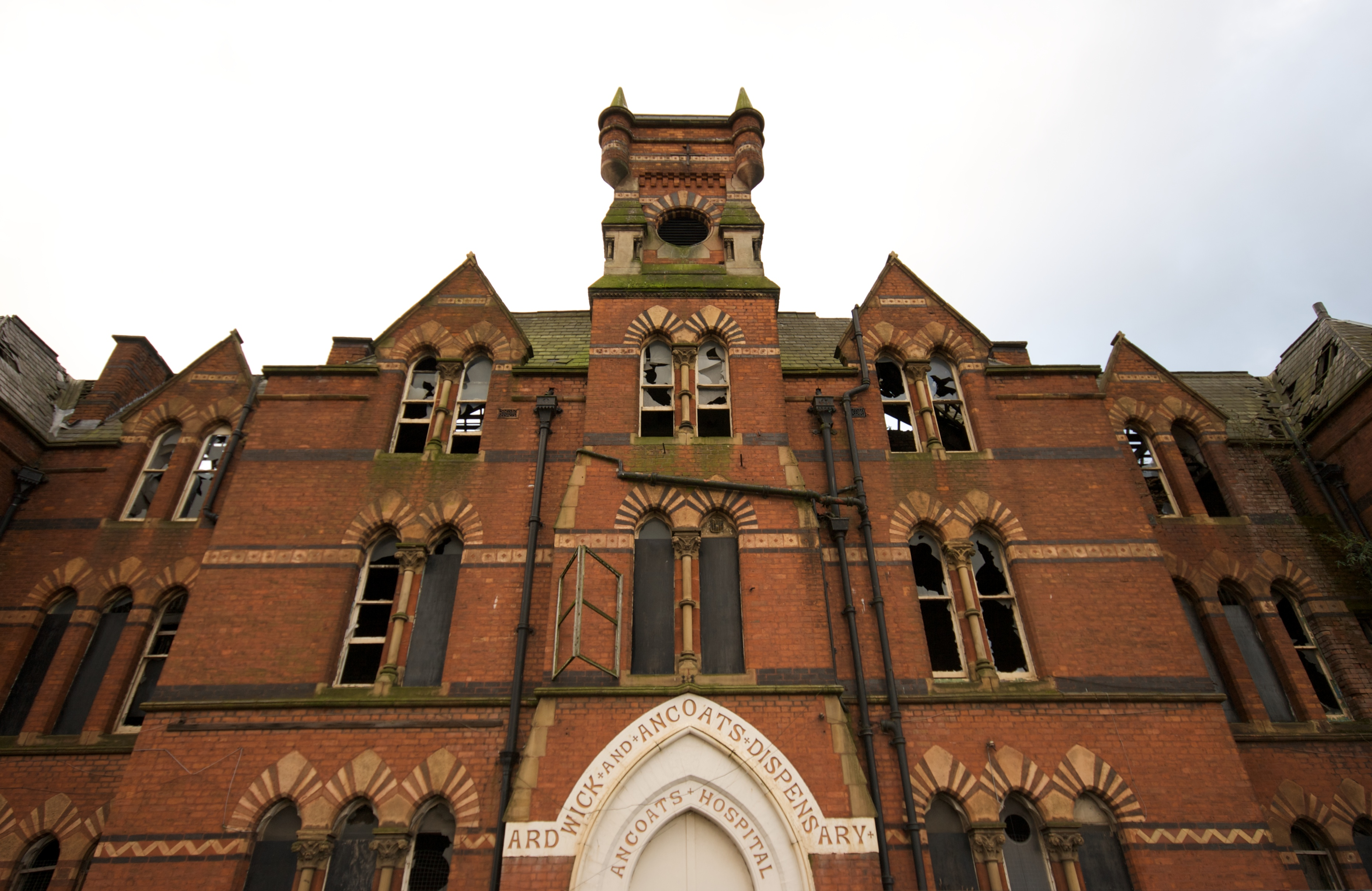
The Ardwick and Ancoats Dispensary

In 1828, the Ardwick and Ancoats Dispensary was established as a separate institution from the MR and at least in part upon the recommendation of that body. While many of the wealthy people of Salford lived within the bounds of that borough, the people of Ancoats created much wealth but saw little of it because the people who owned the businesses generally lived elsewhere. Its first president was another significant owner of local mills, George Murray.

== Others ==
Few establishments during the 20 or so years subsequent to that of Ancoats survived for long. A small and little-documented Dispensary opened at Hulme, near Chorlton, in the early 1830s. In addition, various specialist bodies were formed, such a maternity charity in Chorlton and another that concerned itself with skin diseases, but few of these survived for long. An exception was the Dispensary for Children, established in 1829. that eventually became a significant children's hospital. By 1915 this had become the Manchester Children's Hospital operating on three sites: an outpatient department in Gartside Street, a hospital for inpatients at Pendlebury, and a convalescent home at St Annes-on-the-Sea.

== See also ==
- Manchester Statistical Society
