= George Ewbank =

English cricketer

Personal information
- Full name: George Henry Withers Ewbank
- Born: 17 October 1839; Alipore, Bengal, British Raj
- Died: 30 April 1885 (aged 45); West Norwood, Surrey, England
- Relatives: Christopher Ewbank (brother)

Domestic team information
- Years: Team
- 1857–1860: Sussex

Career statistics
| Competition | First-class |
|---|---|
| Matches | 4 |
| Runs scored | 9 |
| Batting average | 1.25 |
| 100s/50s | 0/0 |
| Top score | 6 |
| Balls bowled | 16 |
| Wickets | 0 |
| Bowling average | – |
| 5 wickets in innings | – |
| 10 wickets in match | – |
| Best bowling | – |
| Catches/stumpings | 2/– |
- Source: Cricinfo, 8 August 2013

George Henry Withers Ewbank (17 October 1839 – 30 April 1885) was an English cricketer. Ewbank's batting and bowling styles are unknown.

Born at Alipore in the British Raj, Ewbank played first-class cricket for Sussex, making three appearances in 1857 against the Marylebone Cricket Club, Surrey, and Kent, before making a final appearance in 1860 against the Marylebone Cricket Club. In his four appearances in first-class cricket, Ewbank scored just nine runs from eight innings, with a high score of 6.

Ewbank served in the British Indian Army in the Raj, taking part in the Indian Mutiny (1857—58) and its aftermath. He was still serving in the Raj in 1862, as a lieutenant in the Madras Artillery. Between 1862 and 1868, Ewbank served in the Bengal Regiment, though by 1868 he was serving as a second—captain in the Royal Artillery. Ten years later he was still serving in the Royal Artillery, achieving the rank of major. He retired from military service in 1882. He died at West Norwood, Surrey on 30 April 1885. His brother, Christopher, also played first-class cricket. Ewbank's previously undiscovered biography The Ewbank Enquiry was published in 2012.
