= Platt baronets =

Baronetcy in the Baronetage of the United Kingdom

There have been two baronetcies created for persons with the surname Platt, both in the Baronetage of the United Kingdom. One creation is extinct while one is still extant.

The Platt Baronetcy, of Rusholme in the City of Manchester, was created in the Baronetage of the United Kingdom on 29 January 1958 for Harry Platt, Consultant Adviser in Orthopaedics to the Ministry of Health and President of the Royal College of Surgeons of England. He was succeeded by his son, the second Baronet. He never successfully proved his succession to the baronetcy and was never on the Official Roll of the Baronetage. On his death in 1998, the title became extinct.

The Platt Baronetcy, of Grindleford in the County of Derby, was created in the Baronetage of the United Kingdom on 14 July 1959 for Robert Platt, President of the Royal College of Physicians, and one of the earliest physicians involved in the AIDS pandemic. In 1967, he was created a life peer as Baron Platt, of Grindleford in the County of Derby, in the Peerage of the United Kingdom. The barony became extinct on his death in 1978 while he was succeeded in the baronetcy by his son, the second Baronet who was a professor of music at Sydney University, Australia. He died in 2000 and was succeeded by his son, the third Baronet, who lives in Dunedin, New Zealand.

== Platt baronets, of Rusholme (1958) ==
- Sir Harry Platt, 1st Baronet (1886–1986)
- (Frank) Lindsey Platt, presumed 2nd Baronet (1919–1998)

== Platt baronets, of Grindleford (1959) ==
- Sir Robert Platt, 1st Baronet (1900–1978) (created a life peer as Baron Platt in 1967)
- Sir Peter Platt, 2nd Baronet (1924–2000)
- Sir Martin Philip Platt, 3rd Baronet (born 1952)

The heir apparent is the present holder's son, Philip Stephen Platt (born 1972)

Coat of arms of Platt baronets

Crest
In front of a demi-plate a nightingale in full song Proper.
Escutcheon
Or fretty Sable platée on a pale Gules a rod of Aesculapius Gold.
Motto
Concord A Res Parvae Crescunt
