= International Federation of Surgical Colleges =

International medical association

The International Federation of Surgical Colleges was established in 1958 as a neutral institute that would speak with a single voice for world surgery. It is based in Lincoln's Inn Fields and constituted as a charity. The members are Surgical Colleges, Associations and Societies across the world.

It organises an annual meeting which, in the 1970s, was regularly held at WHO headquarters.

It is particularly concerned to encourage the interchange of young surgeons between countries.

It is represented on the United Nations Economic and Social Council.

It is involved in the Global Initiative for Emergency and Essential Surgical Care.

Since 1997 it has run surgical courses and workshops in sub-Saharan Africa. It assists with the establishment of National Surgical, Obstetric and Anesthesia Planning in less developed countries.
