= Health Volunteers Overseas =

US-based nonprofit organization

- Founded: 1986; 40 years ago
- Type: Humanitarian health aid
- Purpose: Global health, health human resources, healthcare
- Location: Washington, DC
- Region served: Africa, Asia, Latin America, the Caribbean
- Method: Education and training
- Key people: Board Chair: Carla Smith, MD, PhD; Executive Director: April Pinner, MSPH, RD
- Employees: 11
- Website: hvousa.org

Health Volunteers Overseas (HVO) is a Washington, DC–based nonprofit concerned with health care in resource-scarce countries. through the training, mentorship, and education of local health professionals. Since 1986, HVO has relied on establishing equitable partnerships with hospitals, universities, medical institutes, and Ministries of Health. HVO's programs exploit health professionals as short- and long-term volunteers providing both in-person and virtual training, as well as provide scholarships for on-site clinicians to attend international continuing education opportunities. HVO volunteers provide training on average to over 3,100 health professionals each year across 18+ specialties and 23+ countries.

== History ==
The idea for the organization was sparked by an article by Dr. Ralph Crawshaw, published in the December 1984 issue of the Journal of the American Medical Association. In the article, Crawshaw urged fellow medical practitioners to "make a substantial difference to your colleagues in developing countries" and cited the example of Orthopaedics Overseas. In 1986, the Orthopaedics Overseas Board of Directors voted to become the first division of the newly created Health Volunteers Overseas. Two anesthesiologists went to Ethiopia for the first HVO volunteer trip later that year.

Since opening its doors in 1986, HVO volunteers have completed more than 12,000 assignments in Africa, Asia, Latin America, Eastern Europe, the Caribbean. Volunteers are drawn from the fields of anesthesia, dermatology, emergency medicine, hand surgery, hematology, internal medicine, mental health, nursing education, obstetrics and gynecology, oncology, oral health, orthopaedics, pediatrics, pharmacology, rehabilitation (PT, OT, SLP), and wound management.

In 2020, HVO signed the Brocher Declaration, committing to following ethical and sustainable practices for short-term global health engagements.

== The issue ==
The delivery of health care services in any country is dependent on a trained cadre of health care professionals. The well-documented global shortage of health care providers disproportionately impacts resource-scarce countries. Faced with serious resource constraints, as well as an immense burden of disease, these countries are faced with enormous needs in the health care sector but have limited capacity to educate and support the workforce necessary to meet these needs. As a result, not enough health care professionals are trained, few are offered the opportunity for continued professional education and growth, and most work in isolation with little chance to learn from nearby colleagues. The World Health Organization estimates that the world will be short 15 million health care workers by the year 2030, mainly in resource scarce countries.

== COVID-19 pandemic ==
The pandemic brought sweeping changes to HVO's programming, but the mission remained unchanged. Despite shutdowns, and, indeed, because of them, the need to support health care workers in resource-scarce countries only intensified. When countries closed their borders and it became unsafe for volunteers to travel, HVO transitioned temporarily to an entirely online model of virtual trainings, developing the Remote Education Interface (REI), a unique digital platform providing a space for volunteers and learners to connect, share, present, and discuss relevant needs and topics. In addition to transitioning existing partnerships from in-person to online, HVO continued to open more and more online projects, finding that virtual trainings allowed volunteers to reach audiences that they previously been unable to connect with.

Once travel restrictions lifted and volunteers were once again able to make trips to partner institutions, it became clear that while the return to in-person trips was enthusiastically welcomed, virtual education was here to stay. The hybrid model of programming is an ideal way of delivering the maximum number of educational opportunities to the maximum number of learners. Most HVO projects have moved forward with a mix of virtual and in-person training while several have begun and remained as entirely virtual.

== Organizational structure ==
HVO is governed by a volunteer board of directors representing a diverse background of experience and professions. There are more than 195 health care professionals serving in a variety of leadership positions with HVO, providing the framework for managing HVO's extensive portfolio of projects. A staff of eleven is under the management of the Executive Director.

== Recognition ==
HVO is a Platinum Participant in the GuideStar Exchange, highlighting their commitment to transparency, and the organization meets the 20 charity standards of the Better Business Bureau Wise Giving Alliance. HVO has been selected three times for the Catalogue for Philanthropy: Greater Washington (Classes of 2004–2005; 2010–2011; 2017–2018).

== Volunteers ==
HVO volunteers are trained, licensed health care professionals who are screened by similarly qualified project directors to ensure that their skills and expertise are appropriate to a particular site. Volunteers work alongside their colleagues in resource-scarce countries.

Nearly 40% of HVO volunteers are repeat volunteers. Volunteers cover their own travel costs and the average out-of-pocket costs associated with an overseas assignment are $2,900.

Since 2006, HVO recognizes exceptional volunteers annually with the HVO Golden Apple Award. These are individuals who have made extraordinary contributions to the sustainability and effectiveness of Health Volunteers Overseas and to its ability to meet its mission.

== Countries served ==
Health Volunteers Overseas works with local health care professionals in the following countries:

- Bhutan
- Cambodia
- China
- Costa Rica
- Ghana
- Guyana
- Haiti
- Honduras
- India
- Laos
- Malawi
- Mauritania
- Myanmar
- Nepal
- Nicaragua
- Peru
- Rwanda
- St. Lucia
- Tanzania
- Uganda
- Vietnam
