= Richard Fillery =

English cricketer

Richard Fillery (4 February 1842 – 22 November 1881) was an English cricketer active from 1862 to 1879 who played for Sussex. He was born and died in Henfield. He appeared in 123 first-class matches as a righthanded batsman who bowled right arm medium pace with a roundarm action. He scored 2,676 runs with a highest score of 105 and took 318 wickets with a best performance of seven for 24.
