= Wakeman baronets of Perdiswell Hall (1828) =

Escutcheon of the Wakeman baronets of Perdiswell Hall

The Wakeman baronetcy, of Perdiswell Hall in the County of Worcester, was created in the Baronetage of the United Kingdom on 20 February 1828 for Henry Wakeman, a landowner and member of the Honourable East India Company Civil Service and son of Thomas Wakeman, Mayor of Worcester in 1761. He built Perdiswell Hall in 1788 and married Sarah Offley of Shropshire.

The 3rd Baronet sold Perdiswell and in 1892 built Yeaton Peverey House, Bomere Heath, near Shrewsbury, Shropshire. The 4th Baronet was a member of the London County Council from 1922 to 1925, High Sheriff of Shropshire in 1934 and chairman of the Shropshire County Council from 1943 to 1963. The baronetcy became extinct on the death of the 6th Baronet in 2008.

== Wakeman baronets, of Perdiswell Hall (1828) ==
- Sir Henry Wakeman, 1st Baronet (1753–1831)
- Sir Offley Penbury Wakeman, 2nd Baronet (1799–1858)
- Sir Offley Wakeman, 3rd Baronet (1850–1929)
- Sir Offley Wakeman, 4th Baronet, CBE (1887–1975)
- Sir (Offley) David Wakeman, 5th Baronet (1922–1991)
- Sir Edward Offley Bertram Wakeman, 6th Baronet (1934–2008). He may not have proved his succession to the title, and died without heir.

== Notes ==
Baronetage of the United Kingdom
Preceded by Cooper baronets	Wakeman baronets of Perdiswell Hall; 20 February 1828	Succeeded by Philips baronets
