= Robert Platt, Baron Platt =

British physician (1900–1978)

Platt in 1964

Robert Platt, Baron Platt (16 April 1900 – 30 June 1978), known as Sir Robert Platt, 1st Baronet between 1959 and 1967, was a British physician.

Platt specialized in kidney disease research, but he is remembered for the 1940–1950s Platt vs. Pickering debate with George White Pickering over the nature of hypertension. Platt's position was that hypertension was a simple disease caused by perhaps just one genetic defect, and he presented evidence of its autosomal dominant inheritance and a bimodal distribution of blood pressures, indicating that hypertensives were a distinct subpopulation in humans.

In contrast, Pickering's viewpoint was that blood pressures varied continuously and unimodally, with hypertensives representing the upper end of the bell curve. Though Platt's view was favoured during his lifetime, Pickering's view ultimately dominated and is the basis of current understanding and treatment policies.

During his lifetime, Platt held the salaried position of head of the Central Manchester Health authority, and he later (1957–1962) became the president of the Royal College of Physicians. During his presidency he was influential in the writing and publication of the first College report on Smoking and Health, which assembled all the evidence for a causative relationship. It predated the first report on smoking and lung cancer from the US Surgeon General, which appeared in 1964.

On 14 July 1959 he was made a Baronet 'of Grindleford'. On 16 January 1967 he was created a life peer as Baron Platt, of Grindleford, in the County of Derby. On his death the baronetcy was inherited by his son; the life peerage became extinct. His autobiography, Private and Controversial, was published in the UK by Cassell and Company in 1972.

Coat of arms of Robert Platt, Baron Platt

Crest
In front of a demi-plate a nightingale in full song Proper.
Escutcheon
Or fretty Sable platée on a pale Gules a rod of Aesculapius Gold.
Supporters
Dexter a unicorn and sinister a hart Argent each gorged with a chain Or pendant therefrom a bezant fimbriated Sable.
Motto
Concord A Res Parvae Crescunt

== Sources ==
- Swales JD (1985) Platt versus Pickering: an episode in recent medical history. London, Keynes Press (BMA)
- Zanchetti A (1986) Platt versus Pickering: an episode in recent medical history. By J. D. Swales, editor. An essay review. Med Hist. 30(1): 94–96.

Academic offices
Preceded by Sir Walter Russell Brain, Bt	President of the Royal College of Physicians; 1957–1962	Succeeded by Charles Dodds
Baronetage of the United Kingdom
New creation	Baronet (of Grindleford); 1959–1978	Succeeded by Peter Platt
