= Canadian Network for International Surgery =

Canadian non-profit organization

- Abbreviation: CNIS
- Formation: 1995
- Type: Registered Charity, NGO
- Purpose: Promotes the delivery of essential surgical care to the underprivileged.
- Headquarters: Vancouver, BC, Canada
- Members: Individual, Corporate
- Official language: English, French
- President and International Director: Dr. Ronald Lett
- Website: www.cnis.ca

The Canadian Network for International Surgery (CNIS) is a non-profit organization that promotes the delivery of essential surgical care to underprivileged people in low-income countries. Its objective is also to reduce death and disability caused by any disturbances in normal functioning of the mind or the body that would require surgery. The CNIS emphasizes education in surgical development and research.

The CNIS was federally incorporated in August 1995 and is managed by an eight- to nine-member board of directors with representation from all over Canada. It has a nationwide membership of physicians, surgeons, and others. The CNIS office is located in Vancouver, British Columbia, with satellite office(s) in Africa.

== Activities ==
The CNIS has described itself as having a "4-pronged approach" to aid. This includes the development, delivery, and adaptation of Essential Surgical Skills (ESS) and Basic Surgical Skills (BSS) courses, work in injury prevention, the exchange of surgical information and work in public engagement.

=== ESS and BSS courses ===
The CNIS is engaged with academic departments and professional associations in the southern hemisphere and was founded was to develop northern infrastructure in order to make Canadian surgeons more effective internationally.

Delivery of Essential Surgical Skills includes 5-day workshops in which clinicians who are not surgeons are taught basic surgical interventions and life-saving skills. The BSS course is a 2-day workshop, with topics that include lymph node biopsy, tendon repair, and blood vessel anastomosis. The BSS course is an example of training that was developed at the request of an African learning institution.

=== Injury prevention ===
According to the World Health Organization, injuries and violence account for 9% of global mortality. Two-thirds of deaths due to injury occur in the developing world. It has been argued that injury prevention in low-income countries is an under-scrutinized field. One of the CNIS's primary concerns is injury and, from that, injury-risk reduction. Reducing injury would reduce the need for surgery, while improving access to surgery for residents of low-income countries would improve their overall health. The CNIS has established injury control centers with local governments.

=== Surgical information ===
Through the Surgical Information Program, the CNIS supports medical school and hospital libraries in Africa by sending new or recent surgical/medical books and journals. The CNIS also funds two African students' and one Canadian student's research scholarship at the Injury Control Centre - Uganda (ICC-U). With the help of the Canadian Journal of Surgery, the CNIS provides editorial support to the Association of Surgeons of East and Central Africa Journal of Surgery.

=== Public engagement ===
The CNIS has acted across Canada through its Public Engagement Program, which publicizes the need for access to safe surgical and obstetrical care in Africa. It has recruited Canadian surgical professionals to take part in international surgery projects. Activities have included workshops and seminars, language training, newsletters and cultural events.

== Collaborating countries ==
So far, the CNIS appears to have concentrated its international outreach within the continent of Africa. They have implemented surgical skills training courses in Addis Ababa, Jimma, Gondor, Mekele, and Hawassa in Ethiopia; Blantyre and Lilongwe in Malawi; Bamako, Mali; Maputo in Mozambique; Butare in Rwanda; Dar es Salaam and Moshi in Tanzania; and Mbarara and Gulu in Uganda. The CNIS has begun obstetrical skills training programs in Addis Ababa, Ethiopia and Kampala, Uganda. They initiated injury control center work in Dar es Salaam, Tanzania and Kampala, Uganda.

== Program Support Unit (PSU) ==
This is the first office of CNIS in Africa. The Program Support Unit (PSU) is located in the Black Lion Hospital at Addis Ababa University Surgical Skills Lab, Ethiopia and it supports CNIS activities in Africa.

== Surgical and Obstetrical Skills Training Project in Ethiopia ==
In 2005, the CNIS launched a new innovation project to establish surgical learning centers at six universities in Ethiopia. The universities in this project will have learning centers that are dedicated for surgical and obstetrical care at the end of the project. The project also will have an institutional capacity-building component where surgical department staff will attend workshops in management, leadership and fund raising skills. The project builds on results of previous efforts, which are intended to promote long-term capacity-building in obstetrical and surgical operations and care. The learning centers will train and certify primary care physicians, surgeons, instructors, and other health professionals as well as build up the universities' own institutional capacity (fund-raising, creating linkages are examples of the needs addressed). It is intended that they will provide growing support for hospitals, health centers, and clinics across Ethiopia to address the critical health needs of the population.

Funding for this innovation project was procured mainly through two agencies. The Canadian International Development Agency (CIDA) granted $200,000 for the project, while the Toronto Chapter of the Ethiopian North American Health Professionals Association (ENAHPA) matched the CIDA fund based on a Memorandum of Understanding of mutual support signed in May 2005. ENAHPA will provide $100,000 for the project; the CNIS agreed to provide obstetrical and essential skills training to assist ENAHPA's safe motherhood project in Awassa.

== See also ==
- Anesthesia
- ASA physical status classification system or pre-operative physical fitness
- Biomaterial
- Drain
- Endoscopy
- FACS
- Hypnosurgery
- Knot
- Medicine
- Minimally invasive procedure
- Orthopedic cast
- Traumatology
