= Dispensary =

Office that dispenses medications

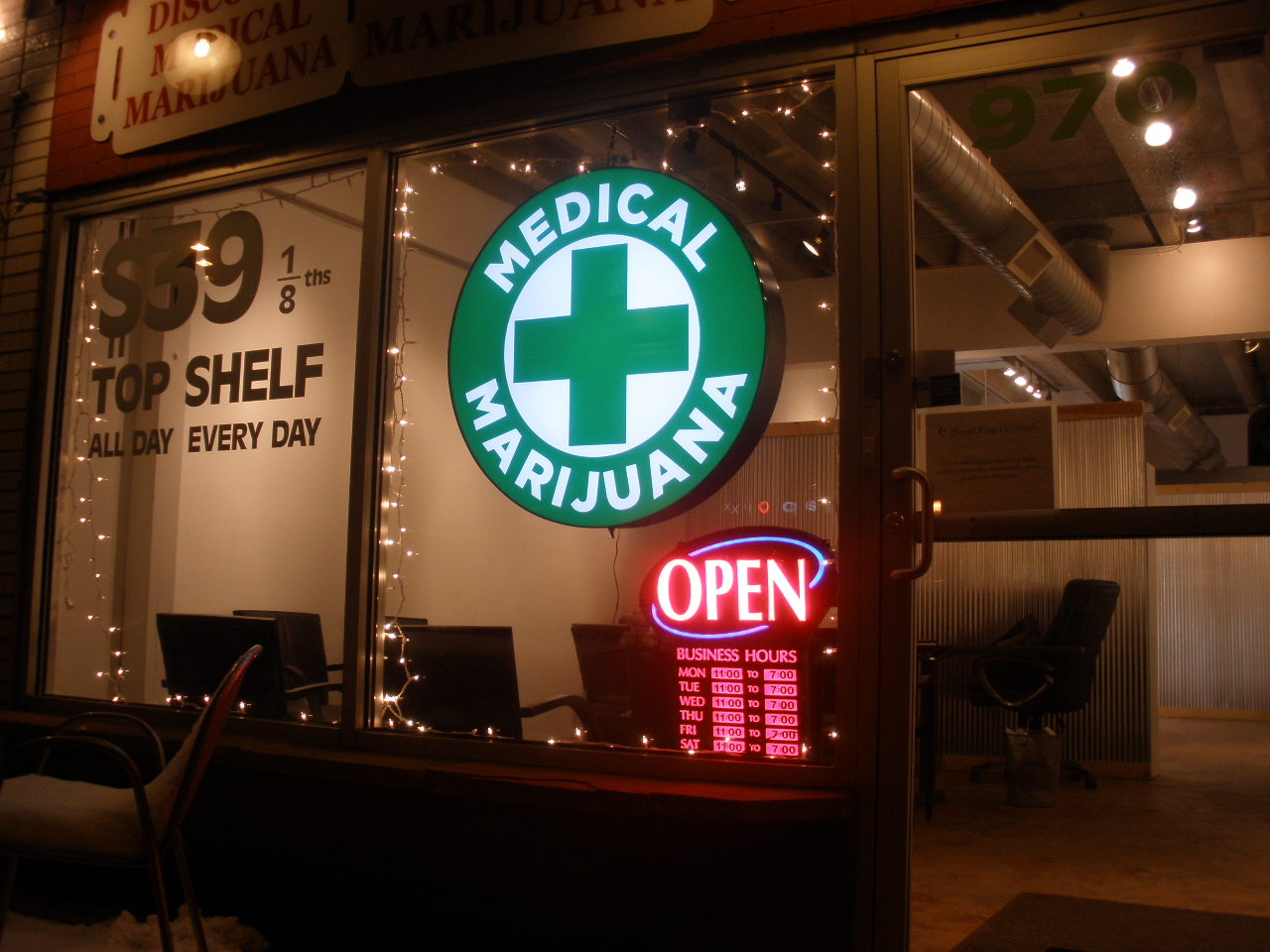
A marijuana dispensary

A dispensary is an office in a school, hospital, industrial plant, or other organization that dispenses medications, medical supplies, and in some cases even medical and dental treatment. In a traditional dispensary set-up, a pharmacist dispenses medication per the prescription or order form. The English term originated from the medieval Latin noun dispensaria and is cognate with the Latin verb dispensare, 'to distribute'.

The term also refers to legal cannabis dispensaries.

The term also has Victorian antiquity, in 1862 the term dispensary was used in the folk song the Blaydon Races. The folk song differentiated the term dispensary from a Doctors surgery and an Infirmary. The advent of huge industrial plants in the late 19th and early 20th centuries, such as large steel mills, created a demand for in-house first responder services, including firefighting, emergency medical services, and even primary care that were closer to the point of need, under closer company control, and in many cases better capitalized than any services that the surrounding town could provide. In such contexts, company doctors and nurses were regularly on duty or on call.

Electronic dispensaries are designed to ensure efficient and consistent dispensing of excipient and active ingredients in a secure data environment with full audit traceability. A standard dispensary system consists of a range of modules such as manual dispensing, supervisory, bulk dispensing, recipe management and interfacing with external systems. Such a system might dispense much more than just medical related products, such as alcohol, tobacco or vitamins and minerals.

== Primary care (Kenya) ==
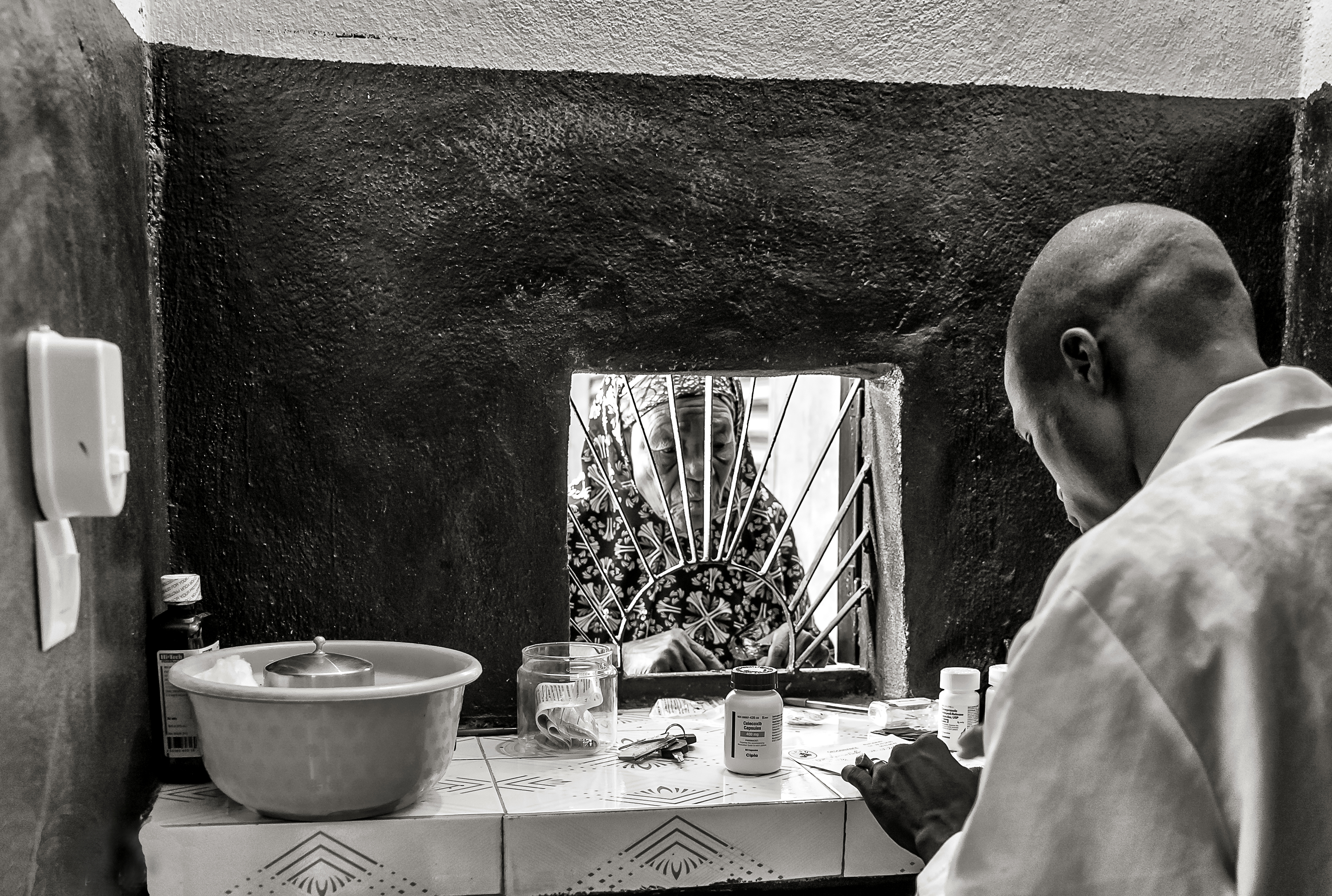
Collecting medicine in Mali, after attending a clinic

In Kenya, a dispensary is a small outpatient health facility, usually managed by a registered nurse. It provides the most basic primary healthcare services to rural communities, e.g. childhood immunization, family planning, wound dressing and management of common ailments like colds, diarrhea and simple malaria. The nurses report to the nursing officer at the health center, where they refer patients with complicated diseases to be managed by clinical officers.

== Primary care (India) ==
In India, a dispensary refers to a small setup with basic medical facilities where a doctor can provide a primary level of care. It does not have a hospitalization facility and is generally owned by a single doctor. In remote areas of India where hospital facilities are not available, dispensaries will be available.

== Tuberculosis (Turkey) ==
In Turkey, the term dispensary is almost always used in reference to tuberculosis dispensaries (Turkish: verem savaş dispanseri) established across the country under a programme to eliminate tuberculosis initiated in 1923, the same year the country was founded. Although more than a hundred such dispensaries continue to operate as of 2023, they have been largely supplanted by hospitals by the end of 20th century with increased access to healthcare.

== Alcohol (United States) ==
The term dispensary in the United States was used to refer to government agencies that sell alcoholic beverages, particularly in the state of Idaho and the South Carolina.

== Cannabis ==
=== North America ===
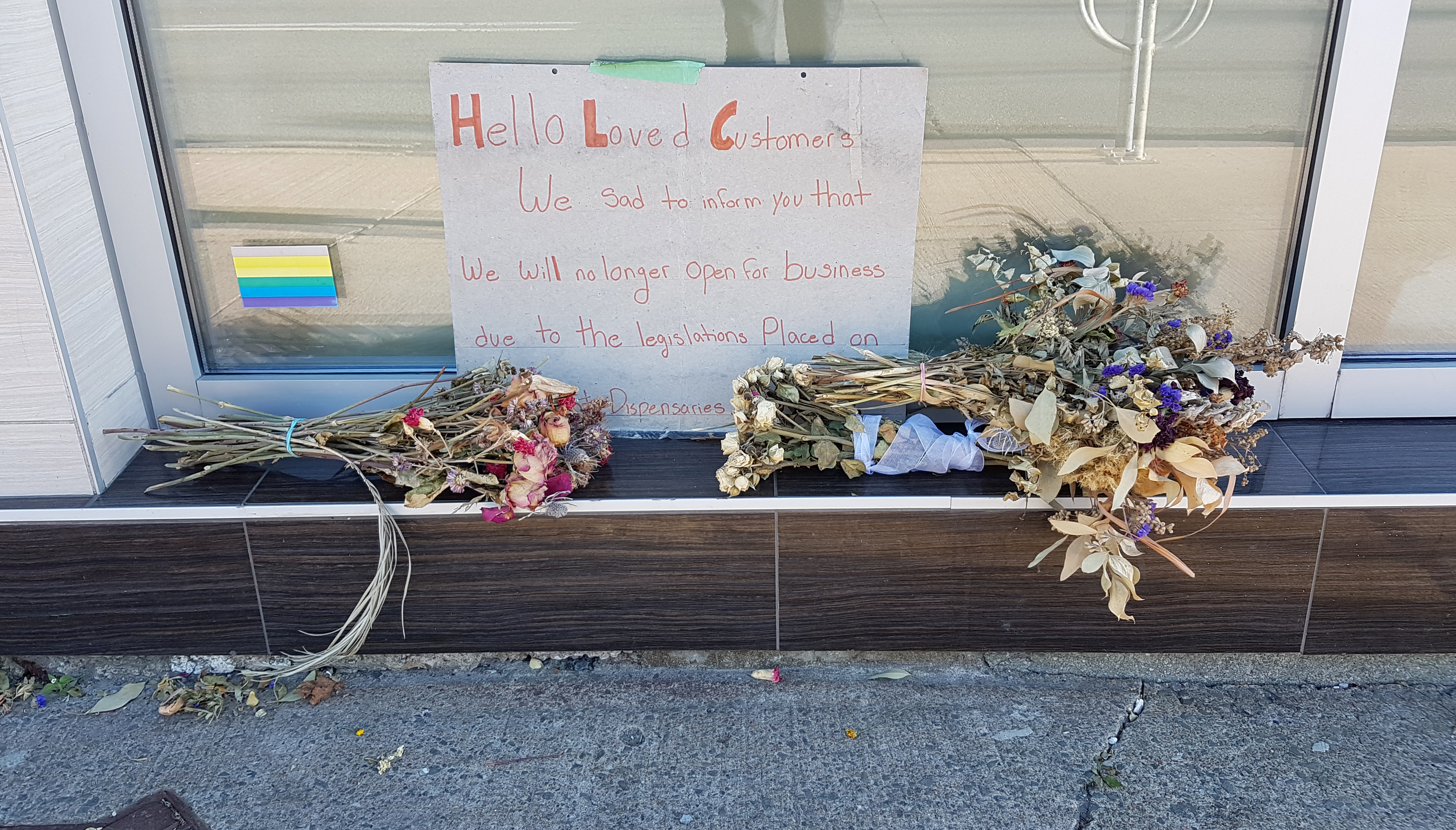
A cannabis dispensary in Halifax, Nova Scotia closes a few days before legalization of cannabis in Canada in October 2018.

In Arizona, British Columbia, California, Colorado, Connecticut, Illinois, Maine, Massachusetts, Oregon, Michigan, New Jersey, New Mexico, New York, Rhode Island, Ontario, Quebec, and Washington, medical cannabis is sold in specially designated stores called cannabis dispensaries or "compassion clubs". These clubs are for members or patients only, unless legal cannabis has already passed in the state or province in question. In Canada dispensaries are far less abundant than in the USA; most Canadian dispensaries are in British Columbia and Ontario.

=== Uruguay ===
In 2013 Uruguay became the first country to legalize marijuana cultivation, sale and consumption. The government is building a network of dispensaries that are meant to help to track marijuana sales and consumption. The move was meant to decrease the role of the criminal world in distribution and sales of it.

== See also ==
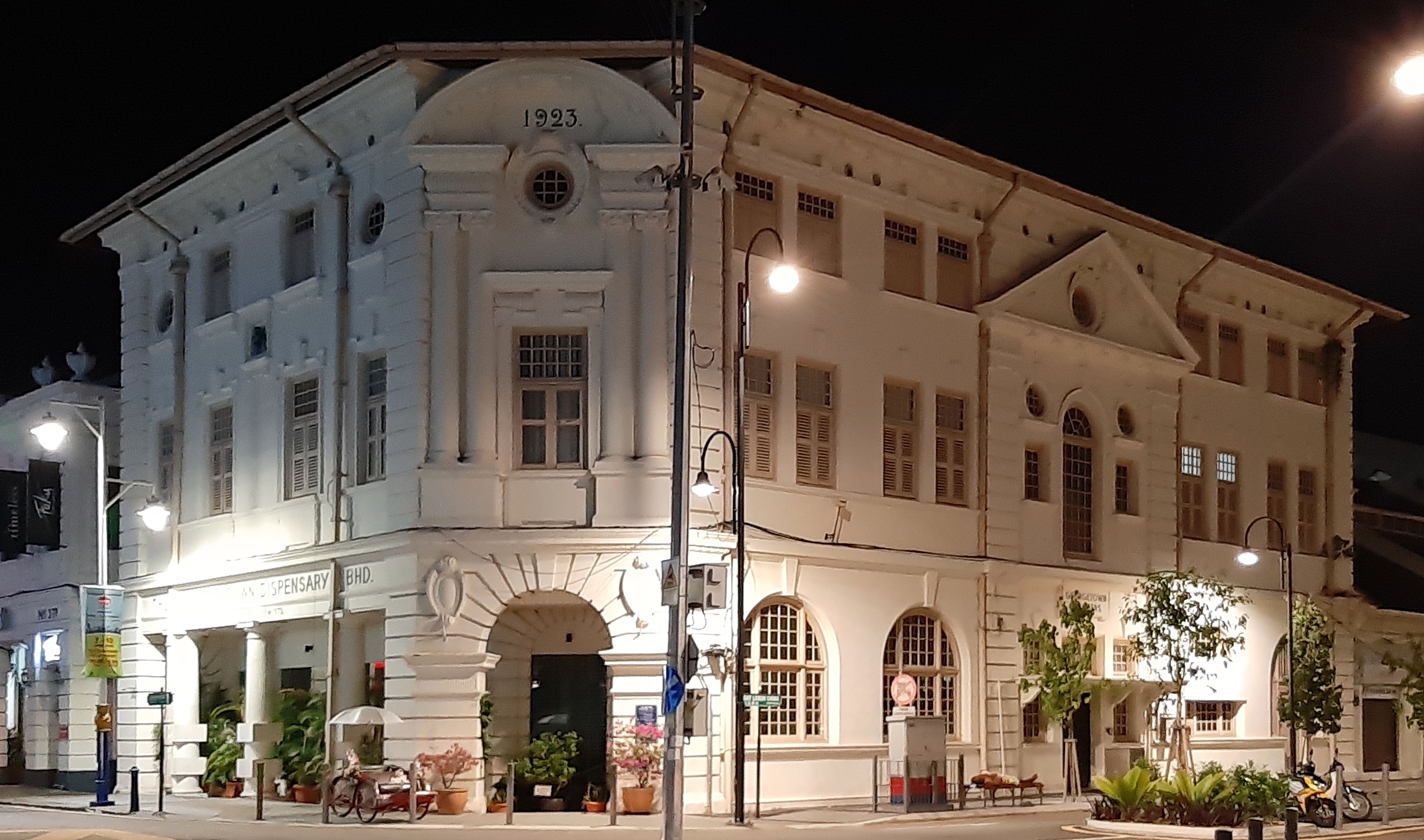
The George Town Dispensary, Penang

- Public dispensary – Free or low-cost medication provider
- Apothecary – Former name for a pharmacist
- Pharmacy (shop) – Shop that provides pharmaceutical drugs
- Dispensary movement in Manchester – Movement to establish local health care
- People's Dispensary for Sick Animals – Veterinary charity in the United Kingdom
- Royal Public Dispensary of Edinburgh – Hospital in Edinburgh, Scotland
