= Albu baronets =

Title in the Baronetage of the United Kingdom

- Creation date: 1912
- Status: extant
- Seats: Glen Hamish Farm, Richmond, KwaZulu-Natal
- Former seats: Northwards, Park Town, Johannesburg
- Motto: Omnia Bene Evenient, All will be well
- Arms: Per chevron raguly Or and Vert in dexter chief an acorn in sinister chief the flower of a sugar bush both slipped and leaved and in base a bear sejant all Proper.
- Crest: The battlements of a tower Or issuant therefrom a demi-bear Proper holding in the dexter paw a flower of the sugar bush as in the arms.

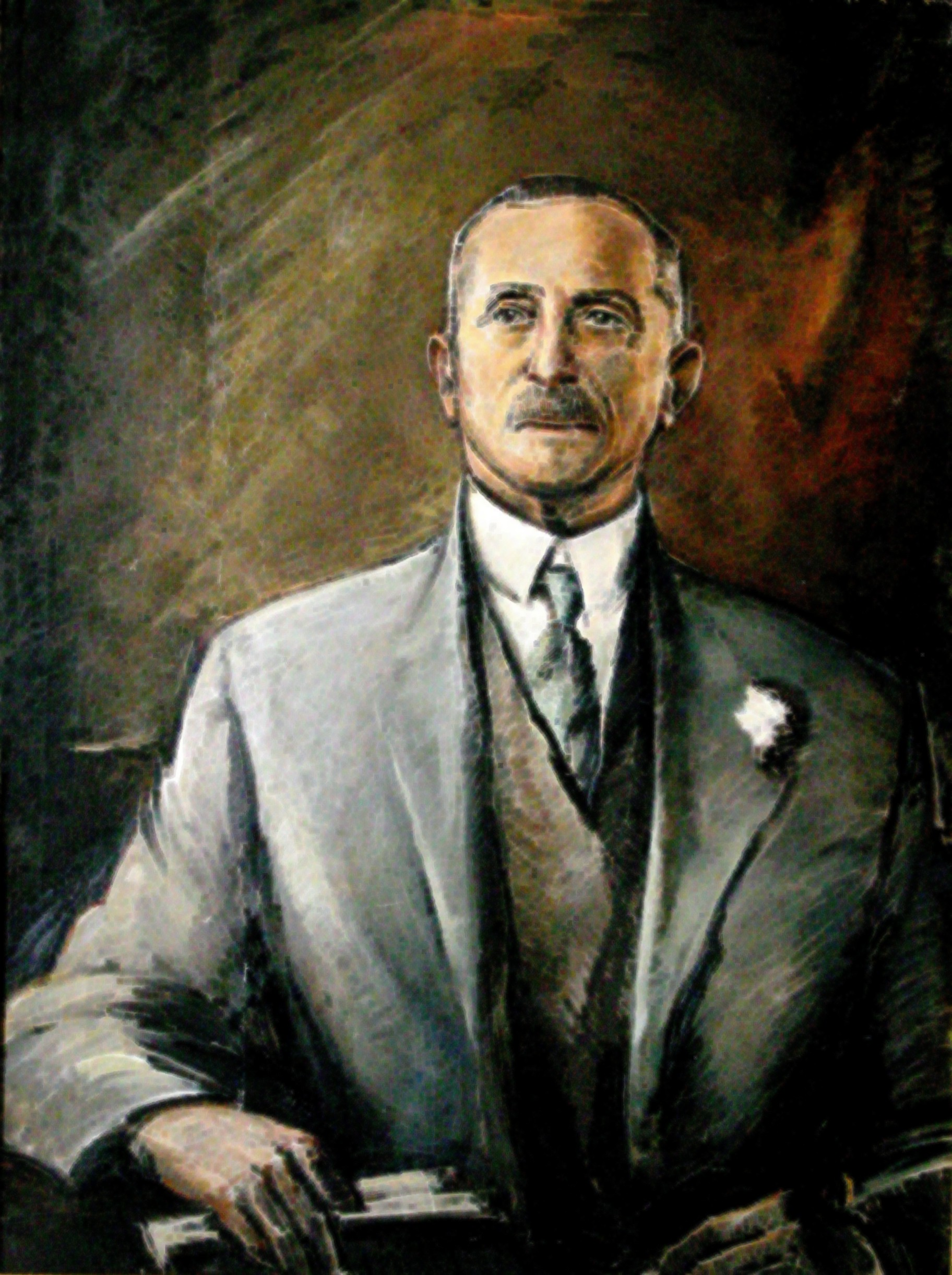
Sir George Albu, 1st Baronet

The Albu baronetcy, of Grosvenor Place in the City of Westminster, and Johannesburg in the Province of Transvaal in the Union of South Africa, is a title in the Baronetage of the United Kingdom. It was created on 12 February 1912 for the South African mining magnate George Albu. He was a founder in 1895 of the General Mining and Finance Corporation, a predecessor of Gencor, with his brother Leopold.

As of 2026, the title is held by the 1st Baronet's grandson, the 3rd Baronet, who succeeded his father in 1963.

== Albu baronets, of Grosvenor Place and of Johannesburg (1912) ==
- Sir George Albu, 1st Baronet (1857–1935)
- Sir George Werner Albu, 2nd Baronet (1905–1963)
- Sir George Albu, 3rd Baronet (born 1944)

There is no heir to the baronetcy, the 3rd Baronet having two daughters.

== Notes ==
Baronetage of the United Kingdom
Preceded by Phillips baronets	Albu baronets of Grosvenor Place and Johannesburg; 12 February 1912	Succeeded by Poë baronets
