= Philips baronets =

Extinct baronetcy in the Baronetage of the United Kingdom

Escutcheon of the Philips baronets

The Philips Baronetcy, of Weston, was a title in the Baronetage of the United Kingdom. It was created on 21 February 1828 for George Philips. Philips was the son of wealthy Manchester cotton manufacturer Thomas Philips (died 1811). In Parliament he sat as a Whig and represented Ilchester 1812–1818, Steyning 1818–1820, Wootton Basset 1820–30 and Warwickshire South 1832–35.

He was succeeded by his son. The 2nd Baronet represented three constituencies: Horsham 1818–1820, Steyning 1820–32, Kidderminster 1835–37 and Poole 1839–1852. He served as high sheriff of Warwickshire in 1859. He married the daughter of the 2nd Earl of Camperdown but had no male issue and the baronetcy was extinct on his demise.

The family seat was at Weston House, Long Compton, Shipston on Stour which the 1st Baronet purchased for £75000 in 1819. The house was demolished in 1934.

== Philips baronets, of Weston (1828) ==
- Sir George Philips, 1st Baronet (1766–1847)
- Sir George Richard Philips, 2nd Baronet (1789–1883)

== See also ==
- Phillips baronets
- Philipps baronets

Baronetage of the United Kingdom
Preceded by Wakeman baronets	Philips baronets of Weston; 21 February 1828	Succeeded by Chamberlain baronets
