= Philipson-Stow baronets =

Baronetcy in the Baronetage of the United Kingdom

Escutcheon of the Philipson-Stow baronets of Cape Town and Blackdown House

The Philipson-Stow baronetcy, of Cape Town in the Colony of Cape of Good Hope, and Blackdown House in Lodsworth in the County of Sussex, is a title in the Baronetage of the United Kingdom. It was created on 26 July 1907 for the diamond magnate Frederic Philipson-Stow, a founder of De Beers. Born Frederic Stow, he had assumed by Royal licence the additional surname of Philipson in 1891.

As of 2026, the baronetcy is marked as dormant on the Official Roll.

== Philipson-Stow baronets, of Cape Town and Blackdown House (1907) ==
- Sir Frederic Samuel Philipson-Stow, 1st Baronet (1849–1908)
- Sir Elliot Philipson Philipson-Stow, 2nd Baronet (1876–1954)
- Sir Frederic Lawrence Philipson-Stow, 3rd Baronet (1905–1976)
- Sir Edmond Cecil Philipson-Stow, MBE, 4th Baronet (1912–1982)
- Sir Christopher Philipson-Stow, DFC, 5th Baronet (1920–2005)
- Sir (Robert) Matthew Philipson-Stow, 6th Baronet (born 1953); his name does not appear on the Official Roll of the Baronetage.

The heir presumptive is the present holder's brother Rowland Frederic Philipson-Stow (born 1954).

== Notes ==
Baronetage of the United Kingdom
| Preceded by Edwards baronets | Philipson-Stow baronets of Cape Town and Blackdown House; 26 July 1907 | Succeeded by Scott baronets |
