= HOB GmbH & Co KG =

- Company type: Subsidiary
- Founded: 1964; 61 years ago
- Founder: Horst Brandstätter
- Headquarters: Cadolzburg, Germany
- Number of employees: 100
- Parent: Brandstätter Group

HOB GmbH & Co. KG is part of the Brandstätter Group, which also owns Playmobil and other companies. HOB GmbH & Co. KG was founded in 1964 as an electronics concern, by Horst Brandstätter. The name HOB is an acronym formed from his name. HOB began developing software and terminals for IBM Mainframe computers in 1981. In 1983, HOB brought the world's first multi-session terminal for Mainframes onto the market, the HOB 78E terminal. Among the company's major customers were MAN, Munich, the OFD Koblenz (Oberfinanzdirektion = Superior Finance Directorate: the central instance for all financial matters of the German state Rhineland-Palatinate), the automakers BMW and Audi, and the German mail-order giant Quelle. Up until 2001, the company produced hard- and software mainly for IBM Mainframes. With the advent of PC's, terminal hardware sales dropped and, in 2001, HOB discontinued production of the multi-session terminals. Since then, HOB produces software providing remote connectivity for a range of computer operating systems. HOB also provides network infrastructure consultation services.

In October 2018, HOB GmbH & Co. KG went into bankruptcy and self-administration, shortly after closing down its overseas development branch in Malta.

== Company milestones ==
- 1964 - HOB Electronic GmbH & Co. KG is founded.
- 1981 - Maintaining its focus on hardware, the company also begins to develop software and terminals for IBM
- 1983 - At CeBIT, HOB launches a simultaneous, multi-session terminal for 3270 access.
- 1990 - Expanding its focus on the software market, the company develops its first Windows-based 3270 emulation.
- 1996 - HOB begins to develop Java-based connectivity technology.
- 2000 - HOB Inc. is founded, expanding HOB GmbH & Co KG into the US marketplace with connectivity applications for Windows Terminal Server, IBM Mainframes, AS/400 and UNIX.

== Areas of operation ==
HOB is an internationally active company that delivers software to a variety of customers in the financial, aerospace, health care, education, government and other sectors. HOB software is available in a variety of languages.

Customer care (support, maintenance, update service) is provided both directly from HOB's central office in Cadolzburg, Germany and by the HOB distributors throughout the world.

In its headquarters in Cadolzburg and other branch offices in Germany, HOB employs about 100 people. In addition to this, HOB also has branch offices in France, Austria, the US and Malta, as well as a network of distributors and resellers all over the world.

HOB applications are deployed in more than 3,000 enterprises from the banking, insurance, public administration, governmental agencies, hospitals and industrial sectors.

== Organizational structure and ownership ==
HOB Inc. and HOB GmbH & Co. KG are both affiliated with HOB electronic GmbH as general partners. These entities belong to the Brandstätter Group. All stock is privately held. Outside capital is not involved.
