= Playmobil Interactive =

Video game franchise

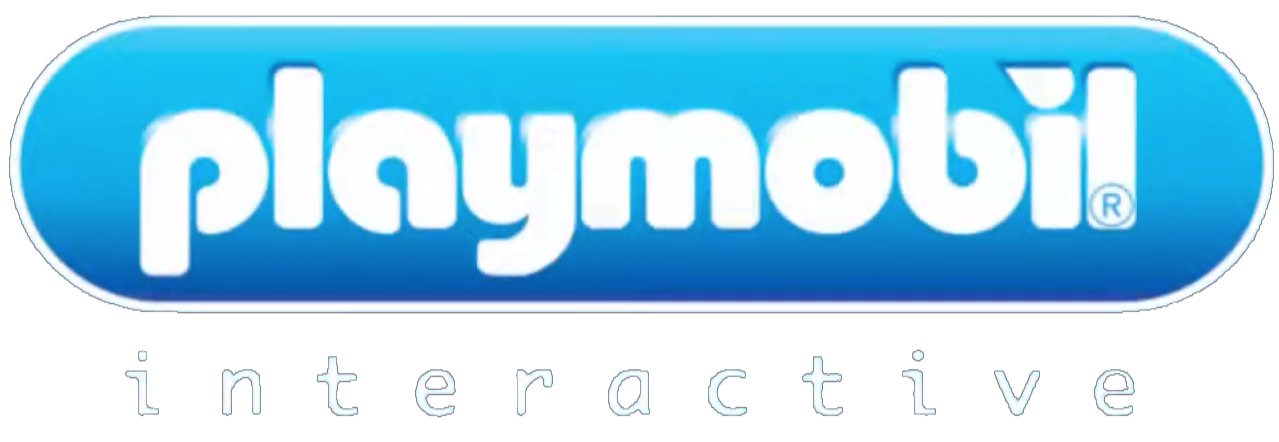
- Genre: Adventure
- Publishers: Ubisoft (1999–2001); Global Software Publishing (2004–2005); DreamCatcher Interactive (2007–2010) geobra Brandstätter (2010–2015)
- Platform: List: Android Browser Game Boy Color DVD iOS MacOS Nintendo DS Nintendo Wii PlayStation 2 Windows 95/98/NT4.0/2000/Me/XP/Vista/7
- First release: Laura's Happy Adventures; October 14, 1999; 27 years ago
- Latest release: PLAYMOBIL Kaboom! May 31, 2015; 11 years ago

Playmobil Interactive is a brand name used by German company geobra Brandstätter for releasing video games and, less frequently, DVDs or short movies based on its Playmobil toy line. Development and publishing of the games was usually delegated to various other companies.

== History ==
Playmobil video games were first conceptualized by Ubisoft as early as 1995. Ubisoft's then-vice president Alain Tascan went on to present these concepts to Playmobil owner Hans Brandstätter at the Nuremberg Toy Fair in February 1998, leading the latter to cancel ongoing negotiations with another game development studio. While the identity of that other developer is unknown, it was rumored to be Psygnosis Limited. The two companies hoped, among other things, for synergy effects in marketing. Development of the Playmobil Interactive series was then closely monitored by geobra Brandstätter, with the company intending to ensure that the games stuck closely to their real-life template. For example, part of the license agreements stipulated that the shape and color of each individual digital Playmobil element had to be approved.

By the 2000s, newer Playmobil Interactive products were produced by the publisher HMH Interactive, a subsidiary of German company HMH Hamburger Medien Haus Vertriebs. In May 2010, HMH entered into a worldwide deal with JoWooD Entertainment to distribute and publish newer titles in the lineup except in Germany, while JoWooD's US division DreamCatcher Interactive would release them in the United States and Canada.

After the release of Playmobil Pirates (2012), the label was largely abandoned for undisclosed reasons. Although other Video games based on the toy line (mostly casual games such as endless runners for smartphones or browser games) were released after this point, all with the exception of 2015's Kaboom! removed the "Interactive" brand name from their titles, logos and advertising material.

== List of video games ==
=== Ubisoft trilogy ===
The first games using the "Playmobil Interactive" brand name, produced by Ubisoft with higher budgets than successive titles.

Title	Details	Short description
Laura's Happy Adventures	System(s): Windows 95/98 – 1999; Game Boy Color – 2000	In this three-dimensional Adventure game, protagonist Laura is tasked with using a magical talking diamond to solve the problems of other residents of a "Playmobil Dollhouse" set by finding and transporting various objects. The Game Boy Color version shares this premise, albeit implemented in a top-down perspective. Furthermore, each issue can only be solved by completing one of 10 mini-games.
Laura's Happy Adventures	Notes: PC version developed by Ubisoft Montreal; GBC version developed by Planet Interactive; Published by Ubisoft	In this three-dimensional Adventure game, protagonist Laura is tasked with using a magical talking diamond to solve the problems of other residents of a "Playmobil Dollhouse" set by finding and transporting various objects. The Game Boy Color version shares this premise, albeit implemented in a top-down perspective. Furthermore, each issue can only be solved by completing one of 10 mini-games.
Alex Builds his Farm	System(s): Windows 95/98 – 1999	To realize his dream of running a successful farm like his father, Alex has to settle into rural life by visiting various country locations and beating minigames ranging across three levels of difficulty.
Alex Builds his Farm	Notes: Developed by Ubisoft Montreal; Published by Ubisoft	To realize his dream of running a successful farm like his father, Alex has to settle into rural life by visiting various country locations and beating minigames ranging across three levels of difficulty.
Hype: The Time Quest	System(s): ~~Nintendo 64 – 1999~~ (unreleased); Windows 95/98 – 1999; Game Boy Color – 2000; PlayStation 2 – 2001	A three-dimensional action-adventure game, in which players have to assist Playmobil figure Hype in making his way back to his own time period after being sent to the past via black magic, facing several puzzles and enemies in the process. The Game Boy Color version is, instead, a side-scrolling platforming game, in which players have to reach key items at the end of a level. Progress then requires using these items in one of the game's towns.
Hype: The Time Quest	Notes: PC and PS2 versions developed by Ubisoft Montreal; GBC version developed by Planet Interactive; Published by Ubisoft	A three-dimensional action-adventure game, in which players have to assist Playmobil figure Hype in making his way back to his own time period after being sent to the past via black magic, facing several puzzles and enemies in the process. The Game Boy Color version is, instead, a side-scrolling platforming game, in which players have to reach key items at the end of a level. Progress then requires using these items in one of the game's towns.

=== "Laura and Alex" adventure games ===
A series of comparatively simple Point-and-click adventure games, in which the two Playmobil children Laura and Alex explore various scenarios based on different Playmobil sets together. The games share edutainment elements as well, often aiming to convey knowledge about the real-life inspirations behind the playsets.

The games were later rereleased in 2010 as 4-in-1 or 2-in-1 bundles by JoWooD.

Title	Details	Short description
Rescue from Rock Castle	System(s): Windows 98/2000/Me/XP/Vista – 2004; MacOS – 2004	Subtitled "Join Laura and Alex in the Kingdom of the Knights", this game sees Alex trying to win the grand tournament of knights, defeat a dragon and rescue Laura from the clutches of evil wizard Grimbeard by solving point-and-click puzzles and completing various minigames.
Rescue from Rock Castle	Notes: Developed by Morgen Studios; Published by Global Software Publishing	Subtitled "Join Laura and Alex in the Kingdom of the Knights", this game sees Alex trying to win the grand tournament of knights, defeat a dragon and rescue Laura from the clutches of evil wizard Grimbeard by solving point-and-click puzzles and completing various minigames.
The Big Treasure Hunt	System(s): Windows 98/NT4.0/ 2000/Me/XP – 2005; MacOS – 2005	While greatly resembling its predecessor gameplay-wise, this game is based on one of Playmobil's "Pirates" sets. The player has to assist Laura and Alex in taking over Capt'n Blackbeard's ship to escape from the island they're stranded on and discover the eponymous big treasure.
The Big Treasure Hunt	Notes: Developed by Morgen Studios; Published by Global Software Publishing	While greatly resembling its predecessor gameplay-wise, this game is based on one of Playmobil's "Pirates" sets. The player has to assist Laura and Alex in taking over Capt'n Blackbeard's ship to escape from the island they're stranded on and discover the eponymous big treasure.
Alarm!	System(s): Windows 98/2000/Me/XP/Vista – 2007; MacOS – 2007	This series entry delves into the world of a Playmobil "City Life" set to showcase Laura and Alex taking on the job of a firefighter throughout eight different missions.
Alarm!	Notes: Developed by Morgen Studios; Published by DreamCatcher Interactive	This series entry delves into the world of a Playmobil "City Life" set to showcase Laura and Alex taking on the job of a firefighter throughout eight different missions.
Construction	System(s): Windows 98/2000/Me/XP/Vista – 2007; MacOS – 2007	The fourth and final game focused on Laura and Alex. Construction aims to familiarize young players with the job of a construction worker, having them assist the in-game characters by managing cranes, forklifts and the sorts.
Construction	Notes: Developed by Morgen Studios; Published by DreamCatcher Interactive	The fourth and final game focused on Laura and Alex. Construction aims to familiarize young players with the job of a construction worker, having them assist the in-game characters by managing cranes, forklifts and the sorts.

=== DS platformer ===
Three two-dimensional platform games exclusively published for Nintendo DS. Players have to traverse side-scrolling levels to collect resources and finish missions for NPCs to progress further through the games.

Title	Details	Short description
Pirates	System(s): Nintendo DS – 2008	Through sailing, side-scrolling levels, and subsequent minigames, players guide a clueless pirate on his quest to accumulate enough gold and other resources to rescue a kidnapped mermaid.
Pirates	Notes: Developed by Morgen Studios; Published by DreamCatcher Interactive	Through sailing, side-scrolling levels, and subsequent minigames, players guide a clueless pirate on his quest to accumulate enough gold and other resources to rescue a kidnapped mermaid.
Knights	System(s): Nintendo DS – 2009	After a magical kingdom has been cursed with heavy rain, Brian the Beet Farmer is being granted knighthood to defeat the Evil Knights and dark wizard FlimFlam by completing over 90 quests and missions as well as upgrading his armor and weapons (once again in the form of a 2D platforming game).
Knights	Notes: Developed by Morgen Studios; Published by DreamCatcher Interactive	After a magical kingdom has been cursed with heavy rain, Brian the Beet Farmer is being granted knighthood to defeat the Evil Knights and dark wizard FlimFlam by completing over 90 quests and missions as well as upgrading his armor and weapons (once again in the form of a 2D platforming game).
Top Agents	System(s): Nintendo DS – 2010	This game, thematically compared to the James Bond franchise by its publisher, has the player traverse platforming, city/driving, and puzzle stages as well as several minigames. Though reminiscent of its predecessors in gameplay, the story this time is centered around the fictional Spy Team stopping mad scientist Dr. Evil and his robot army.
Top Agents	Notes: Developed by Morgen Studios; Published by JoWooD	This game, thematically compared to the James Bond franchise by its publisher, has the player traverse platforming, city/driving, and puzzle stages as well as several minigames. Though reminiscent of its predecessors in gameplay, the story this time is centered around the fictional Spy Team stopping mad scientist Dr. Evil and his robot army.

=== Free advergames ===
Around the late 2000s, the official Playmobil catalog included several discs containing additional advertising material for new sets in digital form. These were usually short films, coloring pages or a product overview. Although all of these discs were labelled as part of "Playmobil Interactive", only the following were considered video games, as evidenced by them receiving an ESRB, PEGI or USK rating:

Title	Details	Short description
Egypt	System(s): Windows 2000/XP/Vista – 2008; MacOS – 2008	In addition to various bonus material such as short movies and printable images, this CD (themed around Playmobil's "History" sets) includes a digital version of the game Senet, a quiz on the subject of Ancient Egypt and a hieroglyph translator.
Egypt	Notes: Published by geobra Brandstätter	In addition to various bonus material such as short movies and printable images, this CD (themed around Playmobil's "History" sets) includes a digital version of the game Senet, a quiz on the subject of Ancient Egypt and a hieroglyph translator.
Dragon Adventures	System(s): Windows XP/Vista – 2009; MacOS – 2009	In this game, the interactive elements are limited to the main menu (a moving digital replica of the "Dragon Land" sets) and a shooting gallery game, in which opposing knights and dragons have to be fended off using spells.
Dragon Adventures	Notes: Published by geobra Brandstätter	In this game, the interactive elements are limited to the main menu (a moving digital replica of the "Dragon Land" sets) and a shooting gallery game, in which opposing knights and dragons have to be fended off using spells.
Top Agents	System(s): Windows XP/Vista/7 – 2010; MacOS – 2010	Along with a short movie showing the conflict between the Spy Team and Dr. Evil, players can select five different minigames to play, which were also available as browser games on the official Playmobil website.
Top Agents	Notes: Published by geobra Brandstätter	Along with a short movie showing the conflict between the Spy Team and Dr. Evil, players can select five different minigames to play, which were also available as browser games on the official Playmobil website.

=== Miscellaneous ===
Titel	Details	Kurzbeschreibung
The Secret of Pirate Island / The Secret of Skull Island	System(s): DVD – 2009; Amazon Prime Video – 2019	This interactive film tells the story of siblings Amelia and Jack, who, after suddenly being transported into a pirate world, end up hunting for the treasure of the mysterious Pirate Island. In between story sequences, players can select from various options, thus influencing the course of the plot.
The Secret of Pirate Island / The Secret of Skull Island	Notes: Produced by Extra Large Technologies (XLT); Distributed by Sony Pictures Home Entertainment; Licensed by geobra Brandstätter	This interactive film tells the story of siblings Amelia and Jack, who, after suddenly being transported into a pirate world, end up hunting for the treasure of the mysterious Pirate Island. In between story sequences, players can select from various options, thus influencing the course of the plot.
World	System(s): Browser – 2011 to 2014	Playmobil World was an MMORPG developed for a target audience starting at eight years old. Due to this particularly young audience, the game was heavily moderated and only accessible during afternoon hours. Players were able to select from a variety classes fitting into the medieval fantasy setting, including knights, wizards and elves.
World	Notes: Developed by Morgen Studios; Published by geobra Brandstätter	Playmobil World was an MMORPG developed for a target audience starting at eight years old. Due to this particularly young audience, the game was heavily moderated and only accessible during afternoon hours. Players were able to select from a variety classes fitting into the medieval fantasy setting, including knights, wizards and elves.
Circus	System(s): Nintendo Wii – 2010	A minigame collection in the party genre, Playmobil Circus allows for up to eight players to compete in various circus-themed environments. In doing so, much emphasis is put on Wii Remote motion controls, though the Wii Balance Board is supported as well.
Circus	Notes: Developed by Morgen Studios; Published by DreamCatcher Interactive	A minigame collection in the party genre, Playmobil Circus allows for up to eight players to compete in various circus-themed environments. In doing so, much emphasis is put on Wii Remote motion controls, though the Wii Balance Board is supported as well.
Piraten	System(s): iOS – 2012; Android – 2012	A construction and management simulation, in which players have to build up and manage their own pirate village, accumulating and distributing resources in the process. At the same time, the village has to be defended against enemies like undead skeletons.
Piraten	Notes: Developed and published by Gameloft	A construction and management simulation, in which players have to build up and manage their own pirate village, accumulating and distributing resources in the process. At the same time, the village has to be defended against enemies like undead skeletons.
Kaboom!	System(s): iOS – 2015; Android – 2015	This shooting gallery game with augmented reality elements uses the cannon of a special Playmobil "Pirates" set. This cannon using infrared sensors can be pointed towards the smartphone's screen to aim at and shoot digital enemy pirate ships.
Kaboom!	Notes: Developed by EyeCue Vision Technologies Ltd.; Published by geobra Brandstätter	This shooting gallery game with augmented reality elements uses the cannon of a special Playmobil "Pirates" set. This cannon using infrared sensors can be pointed towards the smartphone's screen to aim at and shoot digital enemy pirate ships.
