= Sportpark Ronhof Thomas Sommer =

Football stadium in Bavaria, Germany

Sportpark Ronhof | Thomas Sommer
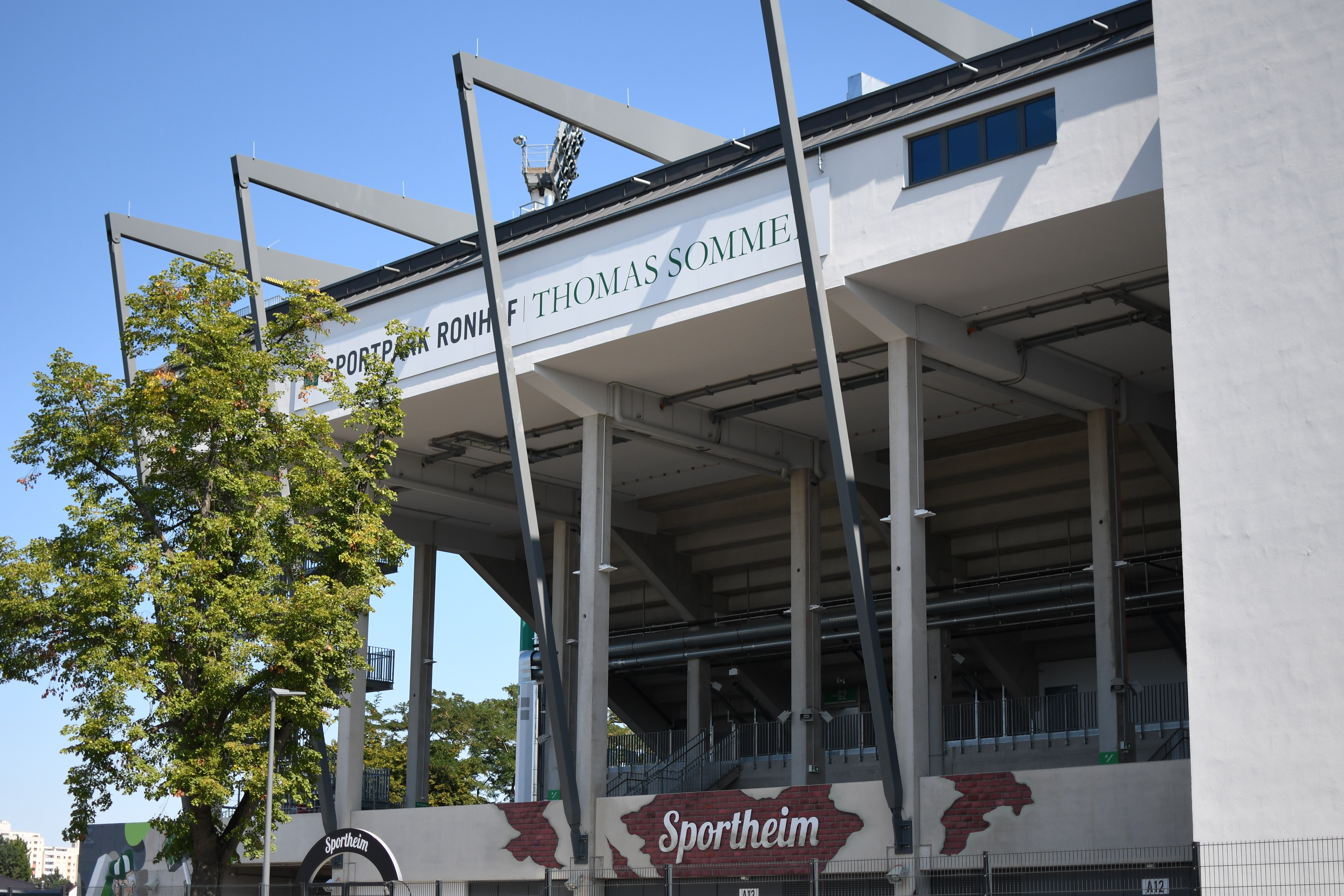
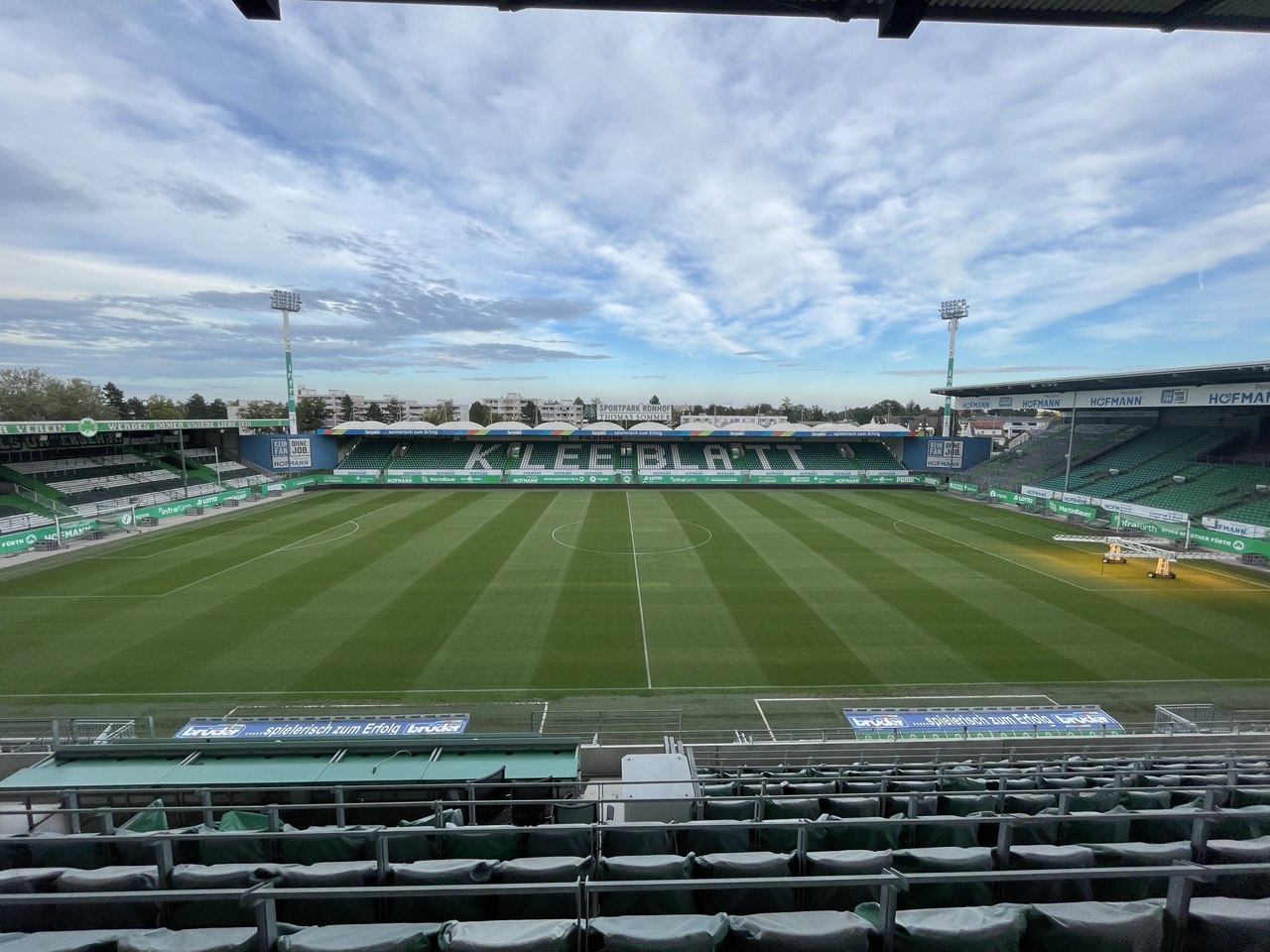
- Interactive map of Sportpark Ronhof | Thomas Sommer
- Former names: Sportpark Ronhof (1910–1997); Playmobil-Stadion (1997–2010); Trolli-Arena (2010–2014); Stadion am Laubenweg (2014–2016)
- Location: Fürth, Germany
- Coordinates: 49°29′13″N 10°59′57″E
- Owner: Conny Brandstätter
- Operator: SpVgg Greuther Fürth GmbH & Co. KGaA
- Capacity: 15,606
- Surface: Grass
- Scoreboard: Metz LCD 9.23 x 6.78 meters
- Record attendance: 32,000 on 3 February 1952 against 1. FC Nürnberg

Construction
- Opened: 11 September 1910
- Renovated: 1951, 1997, 1999, 2007, 2008, 2012
- Expanded: 1911, 1919, 2012, 2015–2016

Tenants
- SpVgg Greuther Fürth (1910–present); Germany women's national football team (selected matches); Germany national under-21 football team (selected mathces)

Sportpark Ronhof | Thomas Sommer is an association football stadium in the district of Ronhof in Fürth, Bavaria, Germany, and the home ground of 2 Bundesliga team SpVgg Greuther Fürth.

The stadium was originally opened on 11 September 1910 under the name Sportplatz am Ronhofer Weg gegenüber dem Zentral-Friedhof (English: Sports ground on Ronhof Lane opposite the central cemetery). It was expanded several times (max. 28,000 capacity) but later reduced to 15,500 and today holds a capacity crowd of 16,626.

== History ==
=== Early history ===
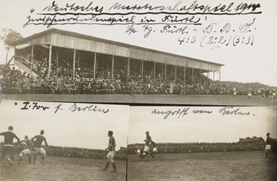
SpVgg Greuther Fürth match in 1910

On September 11, 1910, the stadium was inaugurated on the territory of the then still independent municipality of Ronhof. A small wooden grandstand, as well as standing walls, provided space for about 8000 people. SpVgg (Greuther) Fürth is thus one of the German football clubs that have been playing on their current pitch for the longest time.

Just one year later, the grandstand was enlarged and provided with changing rooms and showers. This meant that 10,000 spectators could now watch the games. In 1919, the stadium was enlarged again - higher earthen walls and wider standing-room steps now provided space for 25,000 people.

In April 1945, the grandstand was hit during an air raid and burned out. An unroofed makeshift stand did its work until May 20, 1951, when the new main stand was inaugurated. It stood with few external changes until its demolition in 2016.

The stadium had a record attendance shortly before this inauguration: on April 1, 30,000 spectators came to the derby against 1. FC Nürnberg, causing the barrier to the pitch to collapse. Nevertheless, everything remained peaceful and the match ended 1–0. This record was set again on April 3, 1952, when 32,000 spectators filled the stadium, also against 1. FC Nürnberg. The match ended 3:3.

=== Financial problems ===
In 1983, due to the oppressive debt burden of SpVgg, the Sportpark Ronhof was sold to Horst Brandstätter (Playmobil).

In 1996, the football department of TSV Vestenbergsgreuth joined the SpVgg Fürth 1903 and the club name was changed to SpVgg Greuther Fürth. The stadium of SpVgg Fürth - the Ronhof - was chosen as the venue. With the promotion to the 2. Bundesliga in 1997, the stadium had to meet new requirements. Previously, there had been no block divisions, no floodlights, an analog scoreboard, and no separation of visiting fans. After both Horst Brandstätter and the city of Fürth were convinced of the importance of the conversion measures, the undertaking could begin.

=== Modernization ===
On July 19, 1997, the new Playmobil Stadium was inaugurated with a match against TSV 1860 Munich. The home side won 1–0, with the capacity dropping from around 2,500 seated and 24,500 standing to 5,000 seated and 9,500 standing. The main stand (2,500 seats), as well as the south stand (4,300 standing) and Block and 1 (700 standing), remained in their previous form - however, fences were erected to separate the fan groups. The north stand (4,500 standing room) was built with prefabricated concrete elements - the back straight (3,000 seats) consists of a tubular steel stand with plastic seats and a Teflon roof. A video screen was also installed, the entrance area was redesigned and new ticket offices were built.

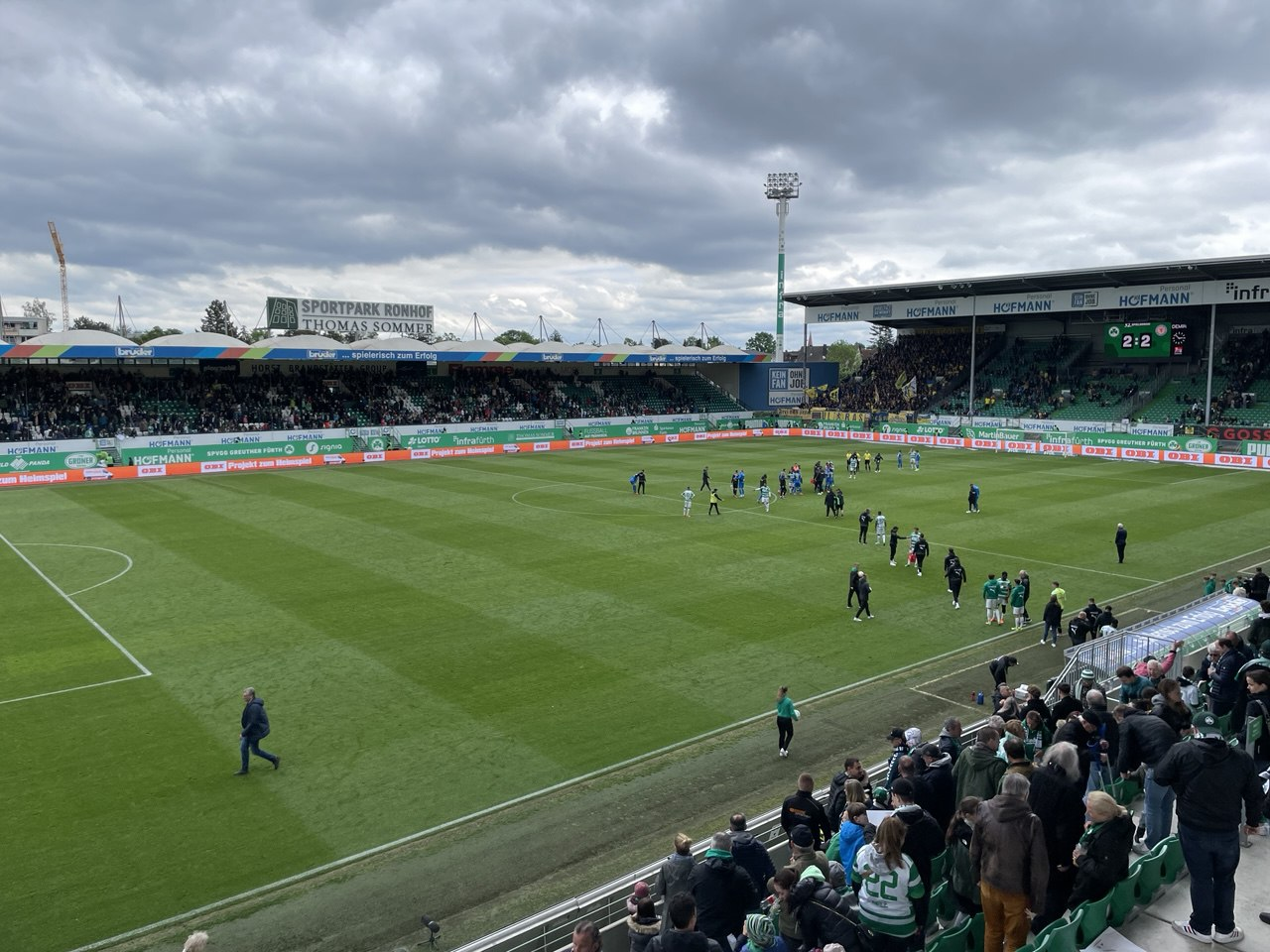
Inside the Stadium after a game against Braunschweig in 2023

In July 1999, the south stand was leveled and a tubular steel structure was erected for seating and standing room. When it was completed in August, the new floodlights were inaugurated. The standing room in the south stand can accommodate about 1,200 guests, while the seating capacity is 4,500.

In August 2003, the stadium received a new video wall. Three years later, this was renewed again. The current scoreboard measures 9.23 by 6.78 meters.

During the 2007 summer break, a turf heating system was installed, new seats for the main stand were installed, and the old Block 1 was demolished. In the summer of 2008, the standing terraces of the north stand were roofed over. In addition, the corners between the counter stand and the adjoining blocks were closed off with media walls. A modular VIP building for 700 spectators was erected on the site of the former Block 1.

Since 2010, the entire stadium has been fitted with seats in the club colors of white and green, and the back straight bears the lettering Kleeblatt. The former main stand was given a new coat of paint. In 2011, the formerly colorful floodlights were painted white-green and fans redesigned the breakwaters and the entrance area of the north stand.

=== Abandoned new stadium plans ===
After interim plans to build a new stadium on the Main-Danube Canal in the south of the city, SpVgg Greuther Fürth extended its lease with the owner until 2040 in November 2012.

=== Redevelopment ===
In August 2015, the lease was extended another time, currently until 2050. At the same time, a decision was made to rebuild the main grandstand. The reconstruction took place in two phases: Phase 1, which included the demolition of the now 60-year-old main grandstand and a subsequent new construction with VIP stands, started in January 2016 and was completed by July 2017. To this end, the infrastructure around the stadium was also expanded away from the conversion of the grandstand. The previous training pitches behind the stadium were replaced by car parking spaces, for which a circular road was also drawn around the stadium. During the new construction, makeshift containers were used for changing rooms and media rooms, which were set up behind the back straight. Players entered the stadium through the open corner between the north stand and the back straight. In the second construction phase, which should have lasted until December 2017 but was delayed by several changes of architect and was not completed until the start of the 2017/18 season, the interior of the new main stand was fitted out. This provided the latter with meeting and conference rooms in addition to the infrastructure for the football events. These replaced the previous VIP North building, which had already been dismantled and sold. In its place, the main stand was extended to the north. The gap to the North Stand was closed before the 2018/19 season. It is still planned to extend the main stand to the south, which should thereby replace blocks A and B.

== Structure and facilities ==
After SpVgg Greuther Fürth's promotion to the Bundesliga in 2012, the south stand was rebuilt, increasing the stadium's capacity by 3,000 seats to 18,000.

The south stand, where the away section is located, was completely roofed over. With the completion of the new main stand, the capacity decreased to 16,626 seats, as tickets are no longer sold in the adjacent blocks A and B in the south for reasons of visual obstruction. In total, there is room for 8,500 standing fans, slightly more than seats (8,126). The stadium is 100% covered.The capacity is divided as follows:

=== Main stand ===
The main stand of the Ronhof is the heart of the stadium. After the old stand from 1951, as well as a temporal stand in front of it, were demolished, the club built a new grandstand with a revamped and vastly expanded VIP section, a new players' and match officials' area and a dedicated press space. Its internal area is used throughout the year for corporate events, as the different areas of the stand can be rented. The new stand has the same breadth as the old main stand. After its completion in 2017, the old VIP building to the north was demolished and a public grandstand in the same style as the new main stand was built, seating about 1,100 people and also functions as the home of the new club shop. Completed in summer 2018, the combined, completely covered, structure seats just under 2,700 spectators.

=== North Stand ===
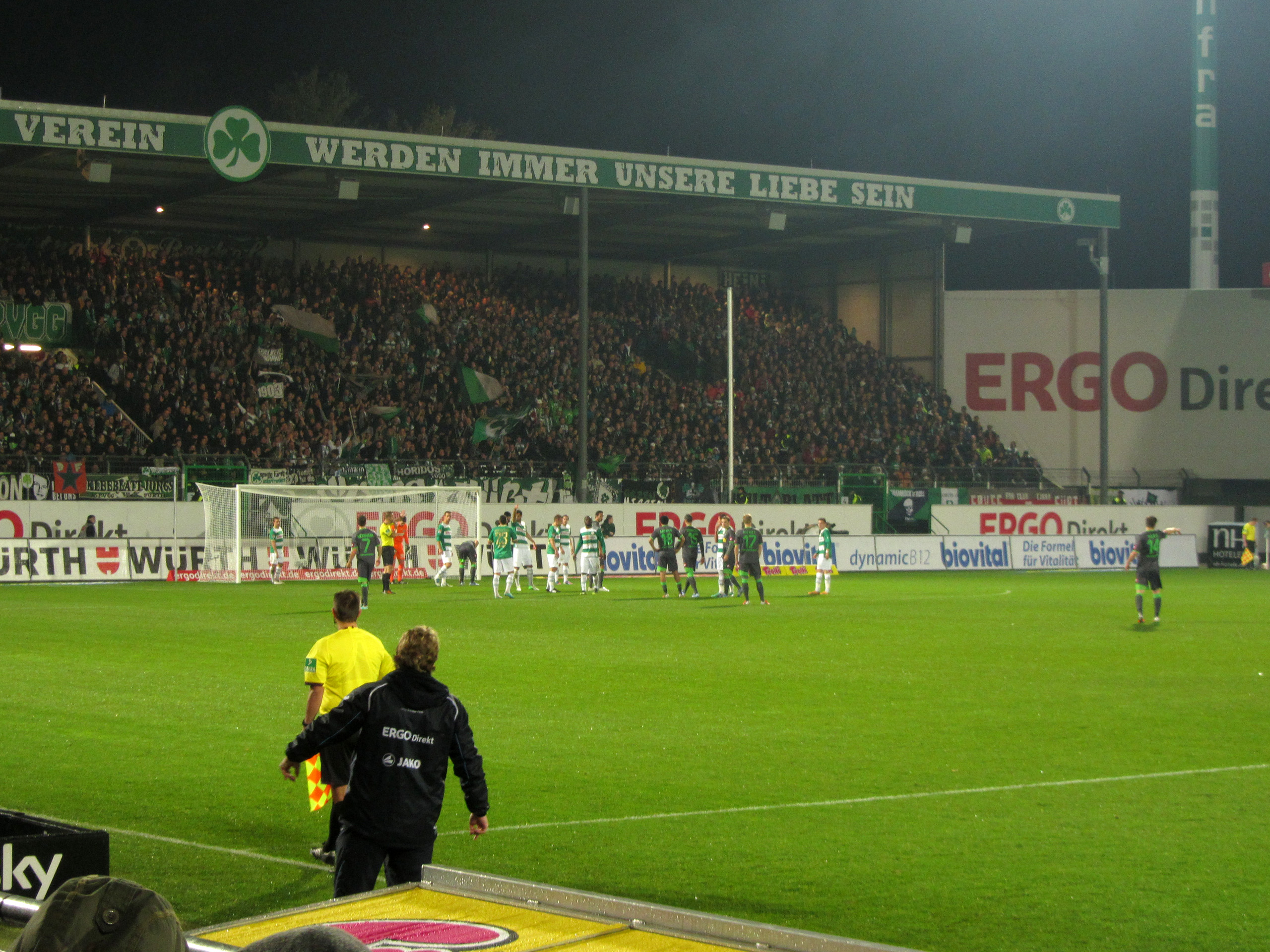
The North Stand

The North Stand is built as a terrace, and is home to the most vocal Fans of the "Kleeblatt". It was built in 1997 as a standing-room-only stand on the ground of the old, curved and which still functions as foundation to the stand. In 2008, the terrace along with the vestibule of the stand were covered with a roof, making it weatherproof. The north stand has room for 4,200 people in three sections, with Fürth's ultra groups finding their home in Block 3. Between the renovation 2008 and 2025, this section was split up to form a supporter-dedicated "Block 12", but due to the wish of the fans and the growth of their groups, this change has been reversed prior to the 2025/2026 season.

=== Back straight ===
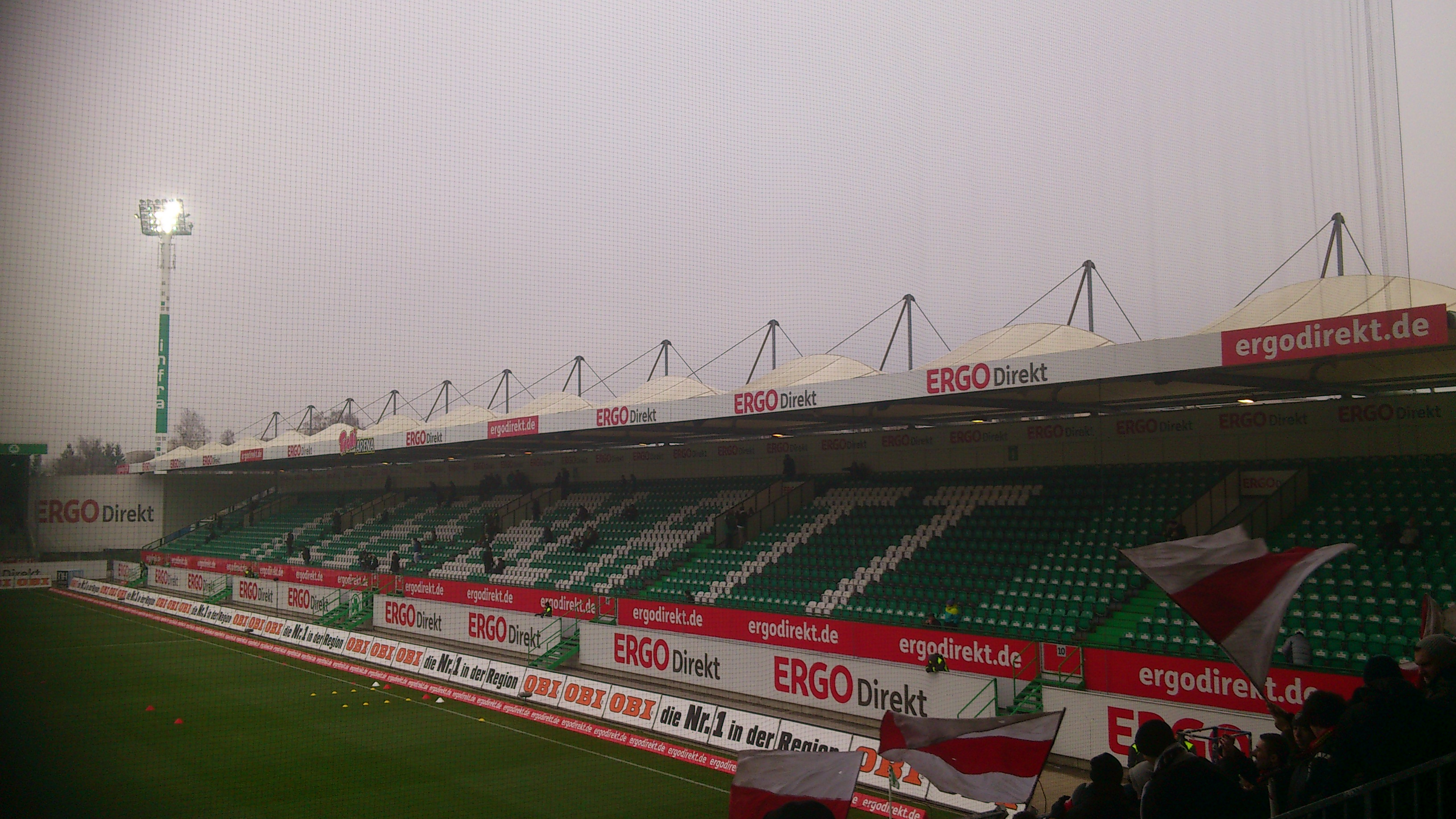
The back straight in 2011.

Also built in 1997 to replace the old back straight with its legendary poplars, which fell victim to the reconstruction. It is a seating-only stand, seats approximately 3,000 people, and is the lowest stand in the stadium. Since 2018, there has been a beer garden behind it. In addition, the family block was moved from the south stand to the area of the back straight adjacent to the north stand.

=== South End ===
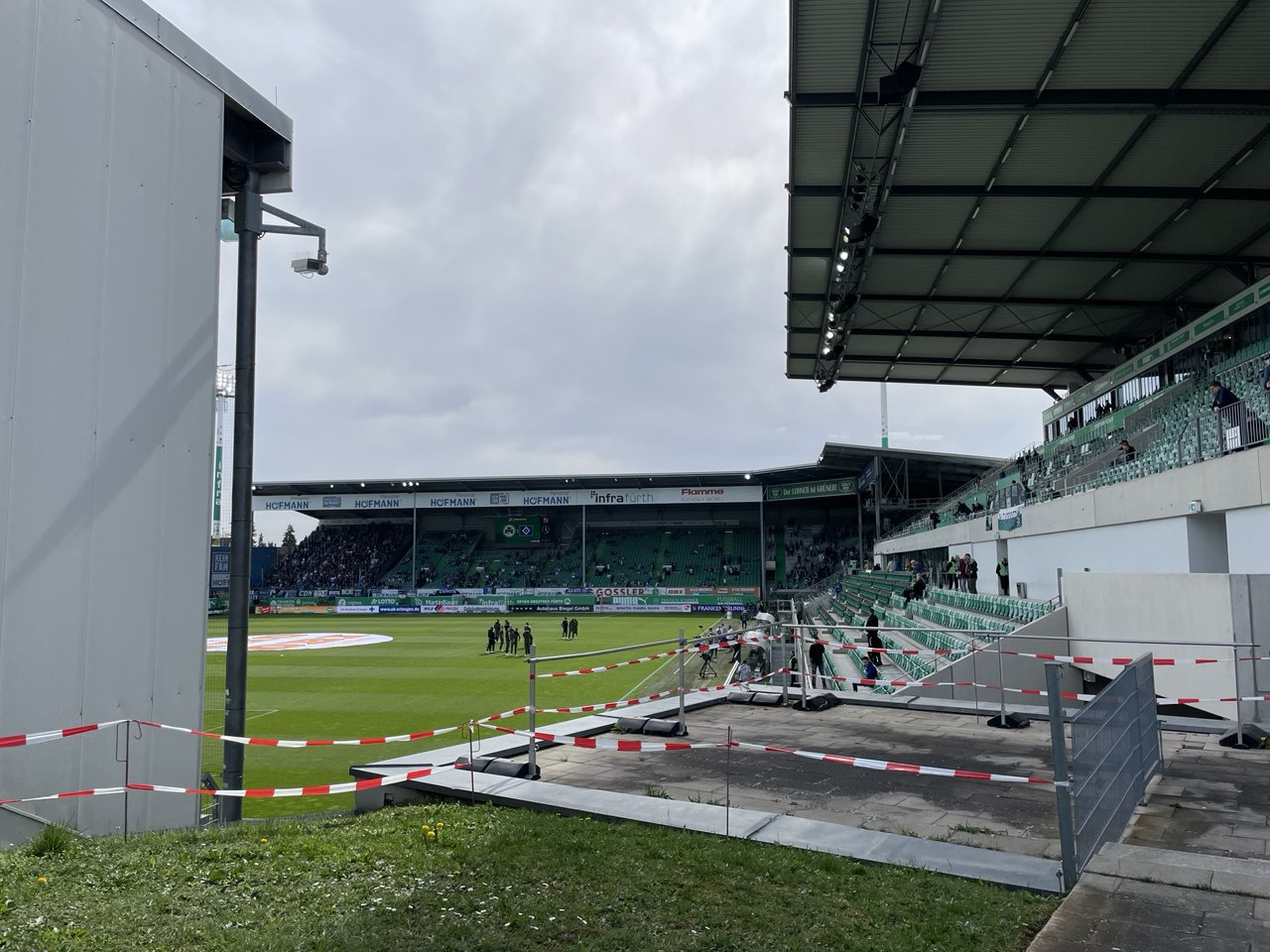
View to the new South Stand, built in 2012

The new Südkurve (or south end) was also built after the promotion in 2012 in place of the old Südtribüne. In the process, the new stand was completely covered and provided with its own floodlights, since the roof restricts the light field of the floodlights. In front of blocks, A and B is a raised and covered platform with a ramp for wheelchair users. The only built-up curve in the stadium is occupied by the "Der Lohner" standing stand, which is named after the late former club president Edgar Burkart, known as Lohner. Behind the goal, there is a seating grandstand, which is built somewhat lower in the area of the scoreboard. Adjacent to this is the away section, whose standing-room area has been carried over without change from the times before promotion. In total, the south stand can accommodate around 8,300 people. However, due to the new main stand being built approximately five meters closer to the pitch than before, the capacity of the south stand is restricted to about 6,700 people, as the sectors A and B as well as a part of the standing sector have no line of sight to the northern half of the pitch and are closed.

=== Corners ===
The corners of the stadium, with the exception of the southern corner on the side of the main stand, are currently not covered with stands. While there are two large advertising boards and the floodlight masts on the side of the back straight, there is a view from the entrance area of the North Stand between the North and Main Stands on the northern side of the Main Stand. There is also a floodlight mast here. There is also a passageway between the main stand and the south curve, so that it is theoretically possible to see a few square meters of the pitch from the street without a ticket.

== Name sponsorship ==
From 1997 to 2010, the Ronhof was officially called Playmobil Stadium. At that time, Horst Brandstätter, inventor and owner of Playmobil, owned the stadium.

At the start of the 2010–11 season, Mederer Süßwarenvertriebs GmbH (now Trolli GmbH) bought the naming rights to the stadium. Between July 2010 and June 2014, the stadium was thus called Trolli Arena.

From the expiration of the sponsorship agreement on July 1, 2014, until February 1, 2016, the Ronhof temporarily bore the official name Stadion am Laubenweg.

In February 2016, it was renamed Sportpark Ronhof | Thomas Sommer. The new name is composed of the traditional name of the stadium and that of the Fürth-born real estate dealer Thomas Sommer, who became Name Sponsor until the summer of 2021. In August 2019, Sommer confirmed the extension of the sponsorship contract beyond 2021 and this regardless of the league. Per year, the contract brings SpVgg half a million euros. In November 2019, it was announced that the sponsorship agreement had been extended into 2025.

== Other uses ==
The Germany women's national football team has used the stadium for three international matches. The matches took place on September 23, 1999, against Ukraine, on March 4, 2004, against China, and on April 8, 2015, against Brazil.

== Gallery ==
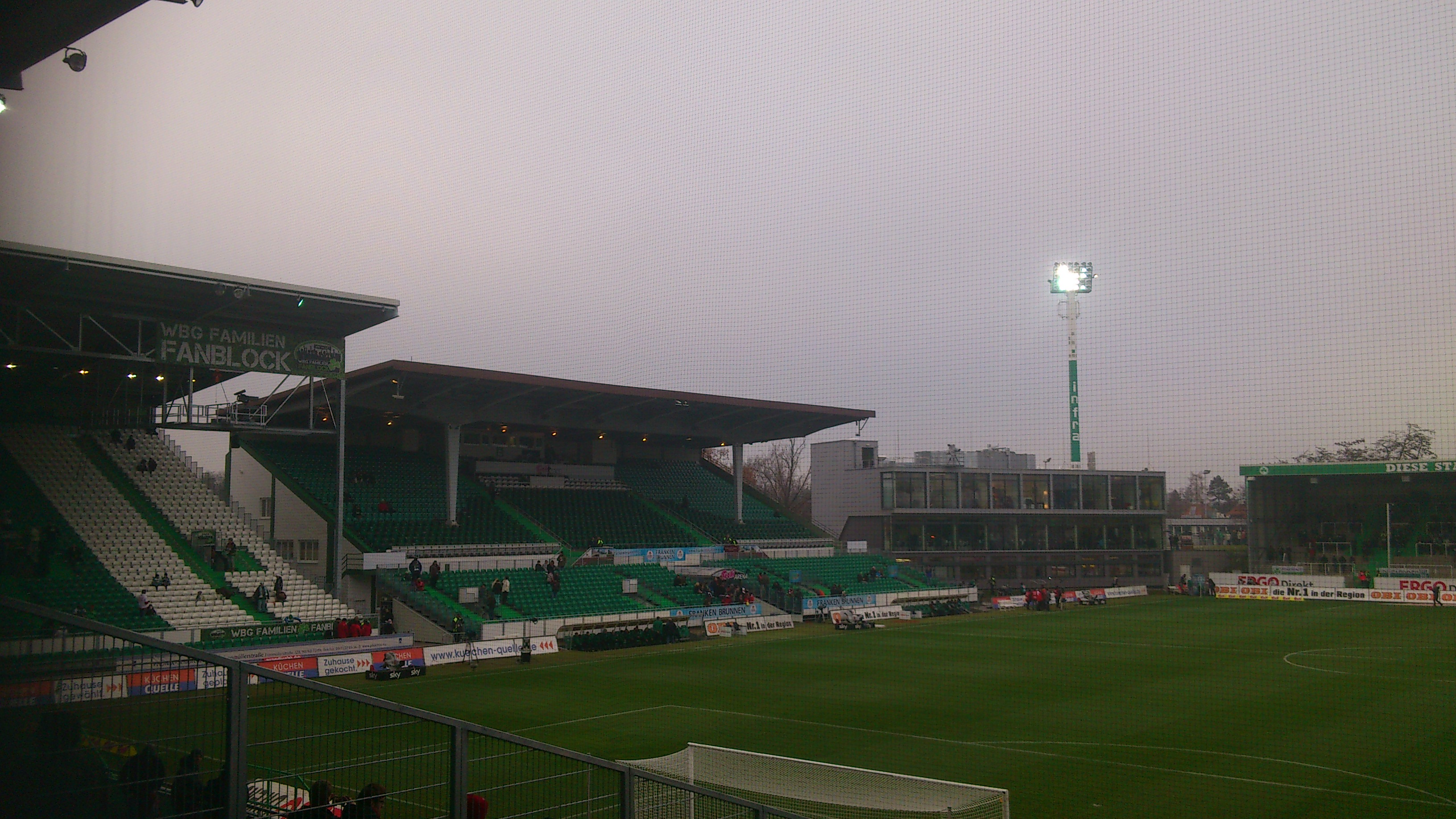
Old main with boxes

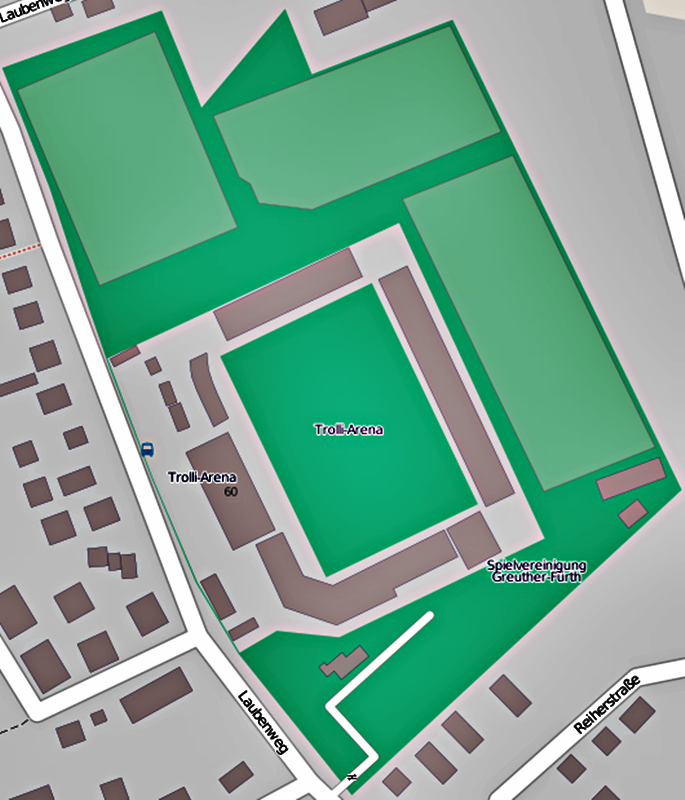
Site plan of the Sportpark Ronhof

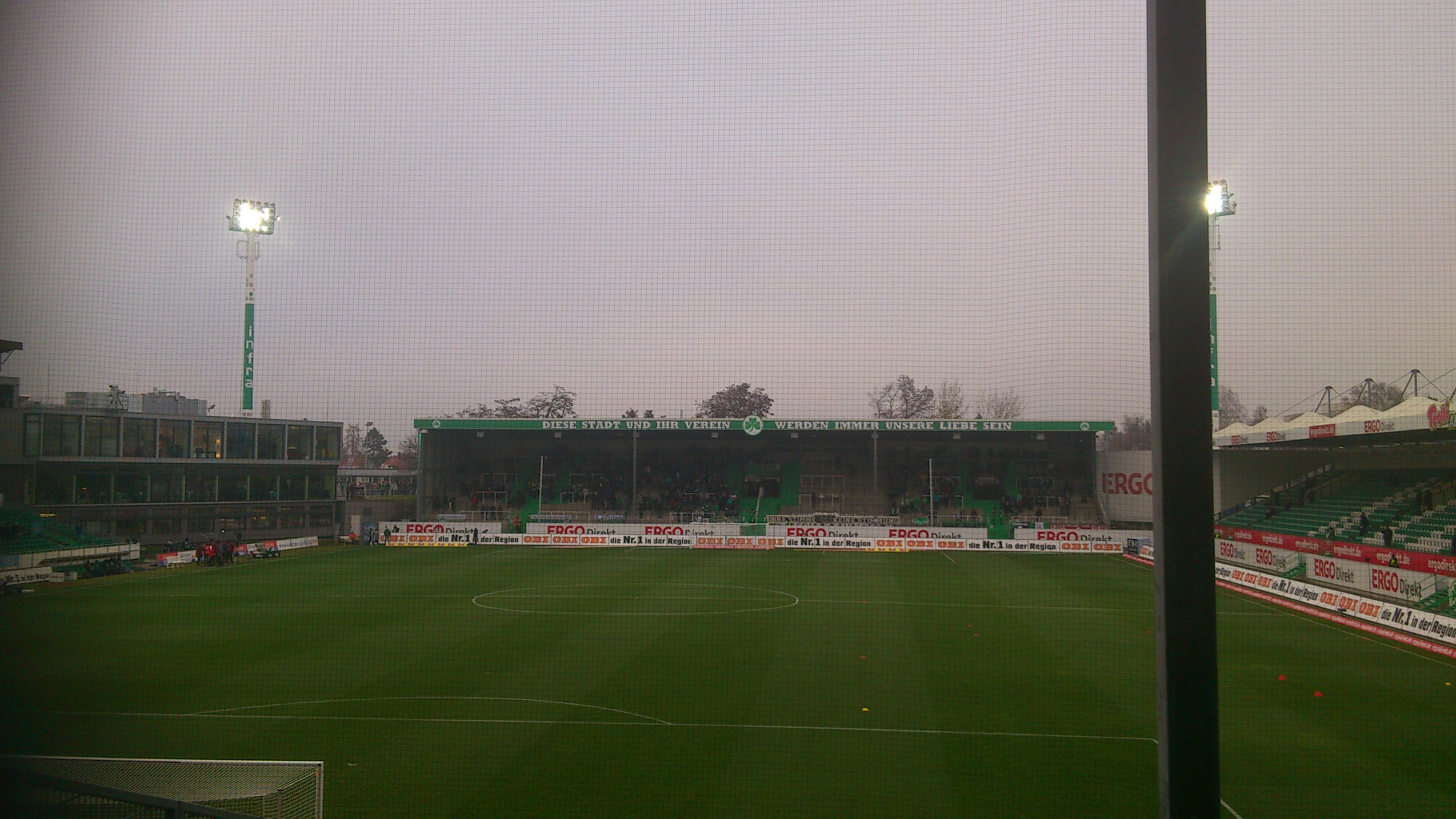
North grandstand in December 2012

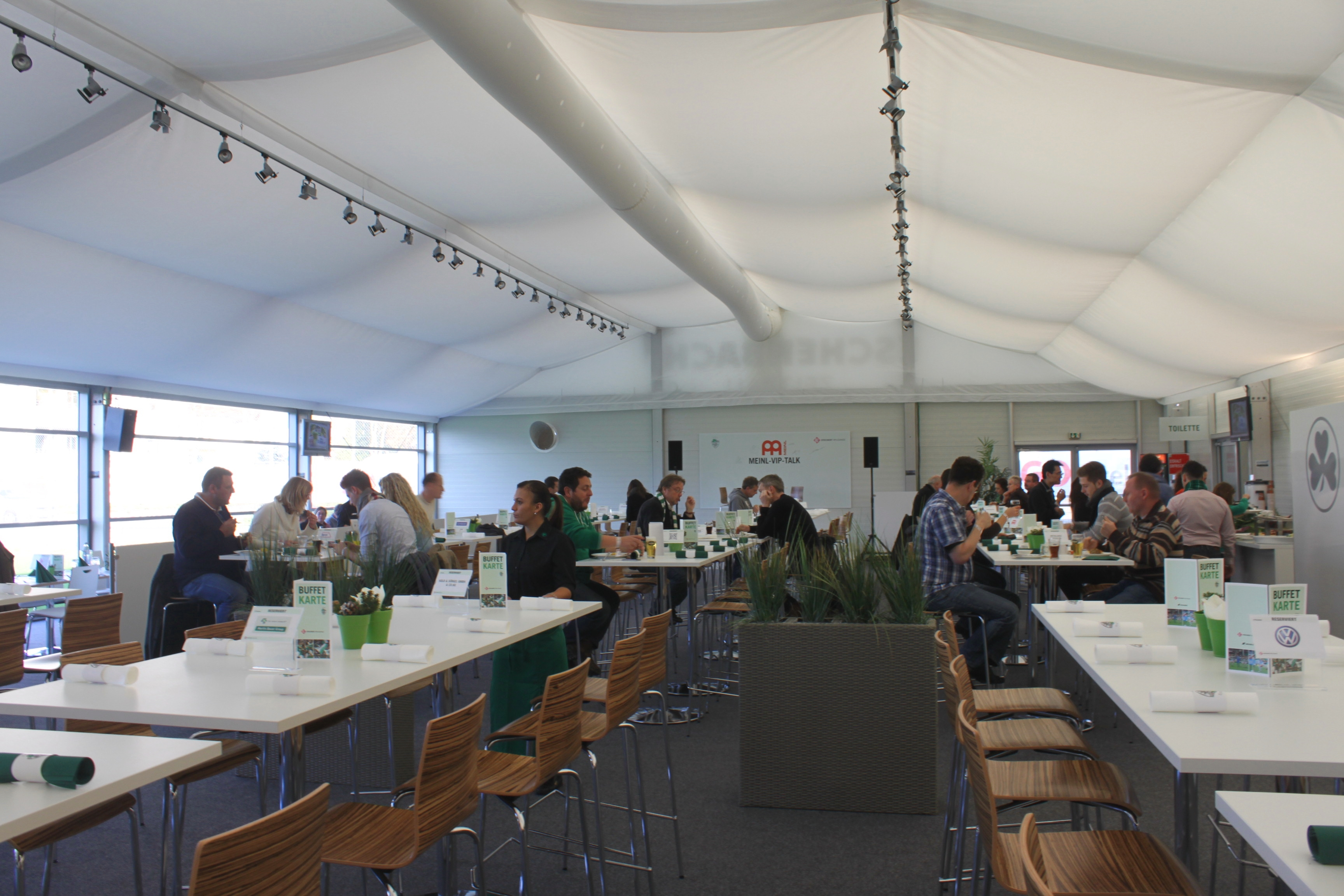
Former VIP area

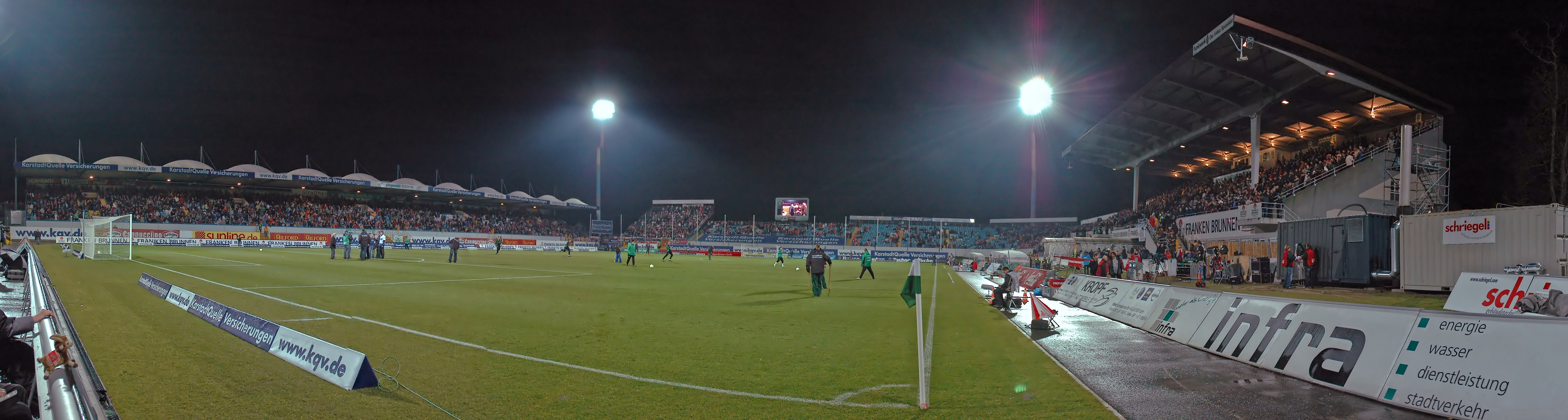
Panorama of stadion

== See also ==
- List of football stadiums in Germany
- Lists of stadiums
