= Hans Beck =

German inventor of Playmobil toys

- Born: May 6, 1929; Greiz, Thuringia, Germany
- Died: January 30, 2009 (aged 79); Markdorf, Baden-Württemberg, Germany
- Known for: Inventing Playmobil toys

Hans Beck (6 May 1929 – 30 January 2009) was the German inventor of Playmobil toys. He is often described as "The Father of Playmobil". He began to make toys at an early age and trained as a cabinet maker, before being recruited by toy company Geobra Brandstätter in 1958. Beck is responsible for developing the Playmobil figure, which, in 1971, was distinctive from existing toy figures by its movable parts. The Playmobil toy line was launched in 1974 and in 1975 became a global success.

== Early years ==
Born in Greiz, Thuringia, Beck grew up in the small town of Zirndorf, which had a history of toy manufacture. While he was still at an early age, his parents got divorced and remarried. As a result, Beck and his sister had eight half-brothers and half-sisters. He recalled, "When I was about 10, I started making toys for them", including, "little cars and trucks, little figures, dolls, some furniture for the dolls", but he didn't imagine becoming a toy designer. At the end of World War II, when he was a teenager, he trained as a cabinet maker and also began to make model airplanes. In 1958, he presented his model airplanes to Horst Brandstätter, owner of local toy company Geobra Brandstätter. He was selected from 20 candidates and recruited as a product designer.

As a hobby Beck built ultra-lightweight model aircraft for flying indoors. He competed in the FAI World Championships in Debrecen, Hungary in 1966 and won the individual title in the F1D class.

== Invention of Playmobil ==
In 1971, Brandstätter asked Beck to develop toy figures for children. Beck spent three years developing the figures that would eventually be known as Playmobil. He said, "I looked around to see what was on the market" but found only tin soldiers that had been produced since the 1800s, which were unable to bend or move. He developed a new figure that measured just under three inches and could move its head, arms and legs. He noted, "My figures were quite simple, but they allowed children room for their imagination".

With the new figures, he conducted research with children. "I would put the little figures in their hands without saying anything about what they were," Beck remarked. "They accepted them right away... They invented little scenarios for them. They never grew tired of playing with them." Brandstätter was not initially convinced by Beck's idea, but allowed the inventor to continue developing the product.

The 1973 oil crisis greatly increased the price of plastics derived from oil. This prompted Geobra Brandstätter to consider products that generated more revenue for less plastic raw material than the hula-hoops and other large toys they had been producing. Beck's figurines offered a possible solution. The company commissioned Beck to develop a series of figures with interchangeable parts and develop a, "system of play which can be expanded and which through relatively small parts made out of the expensive synthetic material offers a high value product".

"Playmobil is a toy that doesn't impose specific play patterns on children," Beck has remarked, "but rather stimulates their imagination."

== Launch ==
In 1974, the company launched Playmobil at the Nuremberg Toy Fair. Some toy wholesalers initially did not like the new toy line. Beck commented, "People didn't realize how much you could do with them". However, a Dutch firm subsequently agreed to buy a whole year's production. Playmobil began to be sold worldwide in 1975.

The first Playmobil sets were of Native Americans, construction workers and knights. Since then, the range has expanded to include fairies, firefighters, prisoners and airport security staff, amongst others. When developing the product line, Beck always maintained the motto of, "No horror, no superficial violence, no short-lived trends". He once stated that a jumbo jet, alien figures, and dinosaurs should never be introduced as Playmobil sets, but all three have since been released as Playmobil products.

== Retirement and death ==
Beck spent 40 years working for Brandstätter before retiring in 1998. He had been the head of research and development at the company for 24 years. During his retirement he was in a legal battle with Brandstätter until his death, having felt that he had not gained enough recognition for his work.

He died in Markdorf am Bodensee at the age of 79 on 30 January 2009 after a serious illness. Geobra Brandstaetter GmbH & Co. released a statement upon his death, stating, "(Beck) rendered outstanding services to the company in a special way," and noted that he worked, "with enormous craftsmanship talent and great qualification. Hans Beck and Playmobil wrote an important chapter in toy history and made millions of children happy."
