= Laura's Happy Adventures =

1998 video game

- 1998 North American cover
- Developers: Ubi Soft Montreal; Planet Interactive (GBC)
- Publisher: Ubi Soft
- Platforms: Windows, Game Boy Color
- Release: PC: NA: 1998; Game Boy Color: NA: 2000
- Genre: Adventure
- Mode: Single-player

Laura's Happy Adventures is a 1998 adventure game developed by Ubi Soft Montreal and published by Ubi Soft, released as part of the Playmobil Interactive series of products. The setting is based on Playmobil's Victorian dollhouse line. The game's storyline revolves around a good-natured young girl named Laura as she solves the mystery of a magic diamond by helping the people around her. A Game Boy Color-exclusive version, simply re-titled Laura, was produced and released in 2000.

== Plot ==
Many years before, while climbing the foot of a cliff, Henry, Laura's grandfather, had met a small fairy named Lumina. A gust of wind had made the small creature lose control of her wings and had fallen into the sea. Henry had dived into the water to rescue the fairy and in exchange, Lumina had rewarded him with a beautiful bracelet. One day, as she is admiring her grandfather's stone collection, Laura picks up a volcanic rock, but accidentally drops it and it shatters on the floor. Inside what had been the rock, Laura discovers a small pink diamond. The diamond comes to life and tells Laura its story. It had been the fairies' lucky charm until the day that one of the fairies, Lumina, had lost it inside a cave which was later filled with lava following the eruption of a volcano. Laura's grandfather had chipped the rock out of the lava, completely unaware that the lucky charm was inside. It then explains that it lost its powers due to its long imprisonment and that in order for it to sparkle and bring luck again, Laura must light up its five facets by helping the people around her and bring them happiness.

Within her home, Laura finds plenty of opportunities to help those she loves. The entire town is preparing itself for the celebration that is to take place that same day, the town's 700th anniversary. Laura's mother, Miriam, is in charge of arranging the preparations, writing the invitations as well as the opening speech, and has no time to take care of her youngest daughter, Laura's baby sister Caitlin. Laura's father, Anthony, is saddened after a small quarrel he had had with his wife which had caused her much grief and needs help to come up with the perfect way of asking forgiveness. Tommy, Laura's younger brother, is crying because, after taking his father's binoculars without asking permission, he had forgotten them at the town gates and had disappeared when he had realized this and had gone back for them. Laura's grandfather Henry, many years after his encounter with Lumina, is still saddened that people fail to believe his story and longs to one day have the proof it takes to convince everyone. Rosie, the cook, is struggling to finish a crisp for the evening's celebration, but she had neglected to collect the nuts that Carmen the fruit merchant had saved for her and does not have time to go to town. Outside, people, too, need help carrying out their daily tasks; Carmen, at the produce stand, has run out of mushrooms, Violet the florist needs her watering can re-filled, Theo the tramp needs a job and Mr. Morris the milkman's back is too painful to continue working and is in desperate need of an assistant. Before the day is through, one adventure at a time, Laura finds ways to help out her friends and family in order to enjoy themselves together at the celebration, where Laura is rewarded and honored by being asked to read the opening speech and begin the festivities.

== Gameplay ==
Laura can move freely in a 3D environment based on Playmobil's defunct Victorian dollhouse line, which included many outdoor sets, such as the flower stand. Many objects and textures were created from scratch based on Playmobil's originals to complement and complete the full town environment.

The game starts in Laura's bedroom; with the use of a keyboard a player can move Laura around her house in a 3-D environment using the arrow keys. The first times that Laura is presented with a new action or interaction that is available, the diamond jumps out of her backpack explaining to her and the player how they can perform it. For example, the first time Laura stands close to a human character, the diamond tells her that in order to interact with that human the player must press the space bar.

Using the space bar allows Laura to pick up certain objects scattered throughout her home and across town. Every time Laura picks up an object, it is placed inside her backpack. Using the tab key, a player can look inside Laura's backpack and select or unselect items. Using the space bar, Laura can select items that she will need to use in her adventures; these items can be used, given or shown to people in different circumstances. Most objects are used only once during the course of the game; only certain objects, such as a magic wand, are kept inside her backpack permanently once they've been obtained. The use of the space bar allows Laura to interact with human characters, open doors and drawers, climb up or down ladders and use the objects inside her backpack.

In order for Laura's adventures to begin, she must first talk to one of the people living inside her household and answering 'Yes' when they ask for their help. Laura can run and search freely throughout her home and town in search for objects and in order to solve the different situations she faces. The 'Z' key allows Laura to jump, an action required a number of times during the game. Each time Laura successfully completes one of the complications in need of being solved, one facet of the diamond lights up. There's no specific order in which these need to be performed, it is up to the player's choosing. When all five facets are sparkling, the game is complete and the conclusion of Laura's story is played, which is the celebration of the town's seven-hundredth anniversary.

The Game Boy Color version was one of a number of Ubi Soft games for the platform that utilized the "Ubi Key" feature, allowing players to share data between games via the system's infrared port and unlock extra content.

== Reception ==
Because the game was intended for young girls, LearningWare Reviews felt some aspects of the game were slightly inappropriate. The game is completed when Laura manages to help each member of her family solve some kind of situation; the reviewer was concerned this might give a young girl the idea that girls are expected to work to make those around them happy. One of Laura's adventures in particular was criticized in the review; Laura is asked by her father Anthony to help him sort out a dispute he had with his wife. Though the dispute was minor and Laura is simply asked to run a few errands and deliver brief love notes, the reviewer felt asking a young girl to settle an argument between two parents was inappropriate, even "disturbing."
