= Hype: The Time Quest =

1999 video game

- Cover for the original 1999 English language release.
- Developer: Ubi Soft Montreal
- Publisher: Ubi Soft
- Director: Benoit Galarneau
- Designers: Alain Tascan; Patrice Désilets; Martin Raymond
- Writers: Phillipe Debay; Guillome Lemee
- Platforms: Windows, Game Boy Color, PlayStation 2
- Release: Windows: FRA: November 12, 1999; NA: November 24, 1999; Game Boy Color: EU: May 2001; NA: July 16, 2001; PlayStation 2: EU: 2001
- Genres: Adventure, role-playing
- Mode: single-player

Hype: The Time Quest is an adventure video game developed by Ubi Soft Montreal and published by Ubi Soft and was released under the Playmobil Interactive series of products. The game, released in the year 1999 along with Alex Builds His Farm (1999), is based on the medieval castle toy series from Playmobil. The U.S. version of the Game Boy Color version was supposed to be released in June 2000, but was delayed for over a year. The game revolves around Hype, a 22-year-old knight in the service of King Taskan IV, following a quest through time to return to his own time in order to save the kingdom from the evil black knight Barnak. Hype's adventures therefore take place in the same kingdom throughout four different periods of its history. The game was directed by Alain Tascan and featured thirty-two different voice actors, as well as original music by Robbi Finkel. The Game Boy Color version was one of a number of Ubi Soft games for the platform that utilized the "Ubi Key" feature, allowing players to share data between different games via the system's infrared port and unlock extra content. Ports for Nintendo 64 and Dreamcast were announced, but never materialized.

== Plot ==
The story begins during King Taskan IV's reign, following the end of a civil war. Hype, the champion of the kingdom, is being rewarded for his loyalty and valor by being presented with the powerful Sword of Peace. However, during the ceremony a mysterious and powerful black knight riding a dragon unexpectedly appears. The knight steps to the King and demands the throne. At that moment, Hype steps before the knight and attempts to confront him, but the black knight is too strong and with the use of powerful magic, transforms Hype into a statue of stone and casts him deep into the past. Two hundred years earlier, Hype's statue appears in the courtyard of an apprentice magician: Gogoud.

After many failed attempts to revive Hype, the young magician, Gogoud, manages to restore Hype to life. As Hype recovers his memory he quickly explains his ordeal with the black knight - known as Barnak - and how he must return to his own time in order to protect his king, take revenge on Barnak and marry his betrothed, Vibe. Sorrowfully, Gogoud explains that he as a magician is not very experienced and is as currently only an apprentice. Still, the young man agrees to help Hype and guide him on his quest through time. Gogoud comes to learn that in order for Hype to return to the future, he must collect a number of jewels. Both are dismayed to learn that each Jewel only allows Hype to advance one leap through time, meaning that he will have to collect and charge jewels hidden in the reigns of Taskan I, II and III before returning to the era of Taskan IV. Throughout his journey, Hype meets a number of faithful friends, including: Zatila the dragon, Karon, leader of the brigands, her daughter Nohlin and many others. On the other hand, Hype also encounters a great number of foes including King Taskan I and his followers; Rajoth the magician - founder of the Laboratories; Enost - King Taskan III's wizard, who defects to the Barnak's side; numerous different soldiers, including Barnak's armies of Black Guards and other servants; Barnak's black dragon Vhoid and finally the evil Barnak himself. Hype also confronts many non-human enemies including wolves, spectres, bats and a three-headed dragon. Hype's adventures take place in the same kingdom throughout different periods of its history. Rivalries and wars erupt between the fortress, the monastery, the brigands and the magicians in the laboratories. Upon returning to his own time, Hype is reunited with Vibe and together they form an army in order to begin an uprising against Barnak, who has taken control of the kingdom. His large army enforce his diabolical regime, forcing the kingdom's people to worship their master as a God, as well as a King. The entire kingdom is guarded by Barnak's evil minions, with the main areas of the Town of Torras, the Forest, Gogoud's Manor, the Brigand Village and the Fortress being closely watched, while 'un-necessary' areas such as the Monastery, Laboratories, and the Field of Courage are closed off at Barnak's command. Most disturbing however, it is due to Barnak's conquest the land has become desolate and a fiery sky above foreshadows Barnak's triumph - causing great sadness over the kingdom's people. The land however, is finally restored to its former beauty when the Black Knight is defeated - his dark magic that plagued the kingdom broken. The spirit of Gogoud tells tales of a new world as the story ends with peace returning to the land.

== Reception ==
Reception

Aggregate score
Aggregator	Score	
Aggregator	GBC	PC
GameRankings	80%	76%

Review scores
Publication	Score	
Publication	GBC	PC
GamePro	N/A	4/5
GameSpot	N/A	8/10
GameSpy	N/A	80%
GameZone	N/A	7.6/10
IGN	N/A	7.8/10
Jeuxvideo.com	N/A	14/20
Nintendo Power	4/5	N/A

The Game Boy Color and PC versions received "favorable" reviews according to the review aggregation website GameRankings. Nintendo Power gave its GBC version a score of four stars out of five, over six months before its U.S. release date.
