= Playmobil FunPark =

Amusement park in Malta

Coordinates: 35°48′50″N 14°30′23″E

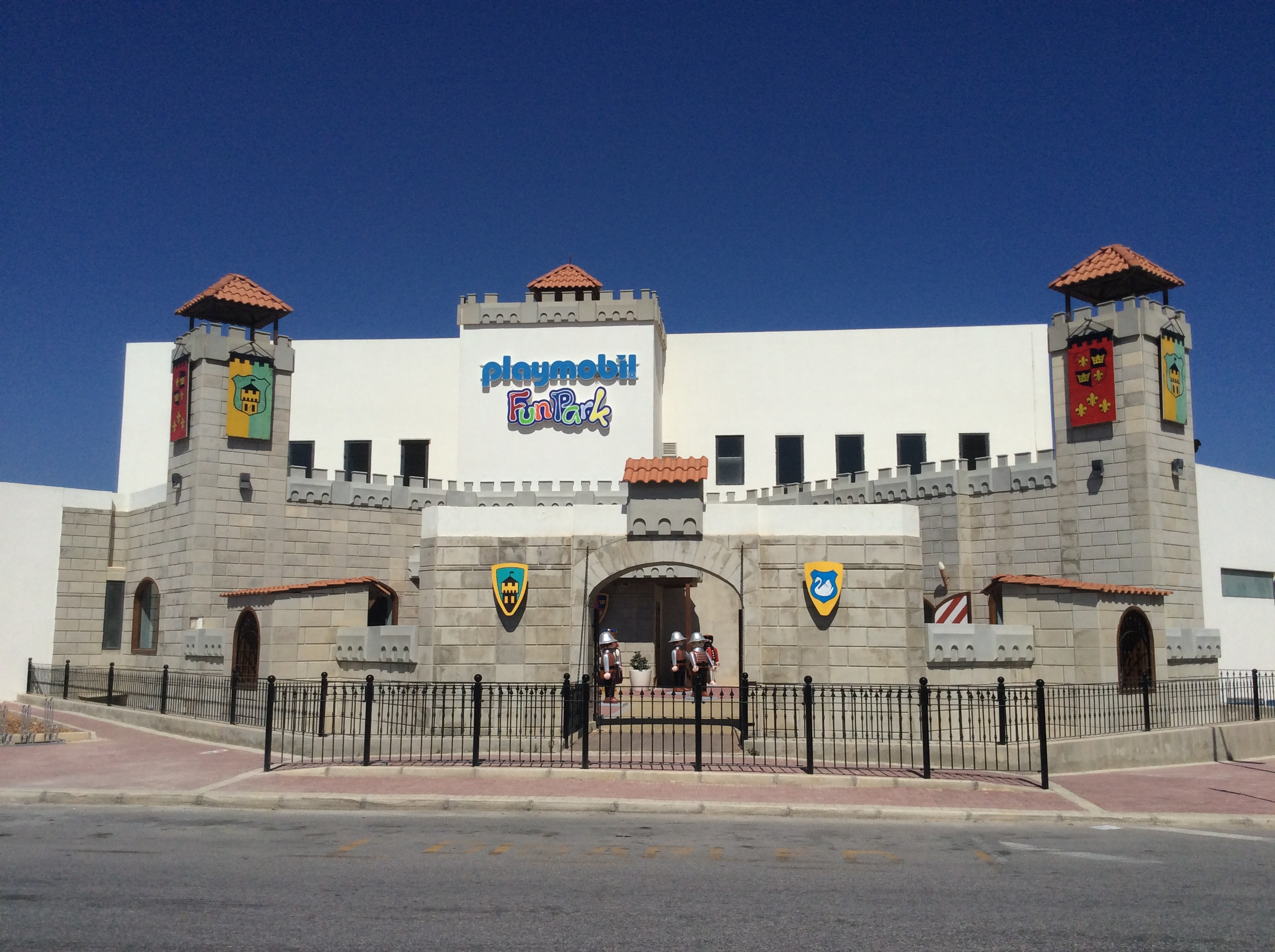
Playmobil Park; entrance façade

Playmobil FunPark is the world's second largest Playmobil factory, located in Ħal Far in the extreme south of Malta. It was opened in 2011 and allow people from 2 years to 13 years. The Playmobil FunPark encompasses an air-conditioned indoor play area with Princess, Knights and Police themes and divided into two sections – a 1.2.3 baby and toddler area and the 4 + play area with Playmobil play sets and figures. There is also an outdoor play area that has a Pirate theme where children can play out their fantasies on the pirate ship, slides, bridges, tree house and the water channel. There is also a cafeteria and gift shop in the FunPark.
