= Horst Brandstätter =

German businessman

- Born: June 27, 1933; Zirndorf, Germany
- Died: June 3, 2015 (aged 81); Fürth, Germany
- Occupation: Businessman

Horst Brandstätter (June 27, 1933 – June 3, 2015) was the owner of the German company Brandstätter Group. The company was founded by Andreas Brandstätter in 1876. At the age of 19, Horst Brandstätter followed in his father's footsteps by joining the family business and successfully modernised it. One of his major successes was the production of hula hoops in 1958. In the early 1970s he commissioned inventor and employee Hans Beck to produce a toy system that would eventually become known as Playmobil. Brandstätter retired from the company in 2000, but regularly visited the company offices until his death in 2015.

== Early life ==
Horst Brandstätter was born on June 27, 1933, in Zirndorf, Germany. He lost his father when he was seven years old and was told by his mother that he would eventually take his father's place in the family toy company at the age of 21. Before joining the business, Brandstätter trained as an apprentice in a mold and die manufacturing company, at his mother's request.

== Career ==
Brandstätter joined the family firm in 1952 at the age of 19. At the time, the company was run by his two uncles. From his early years working at the company, Brandstätter realised that the working methods were outdated and worked to modernise it. His conviction that the company needed to move with the times resulted in success, with the production of hula hoops in 1958, which became a European success.

By the age of 78, Brandstätter had been voted Manager of the Year in 2009, was bearer of the German Federal Cross of Merit and honorary citizen of the city of Zirndorf.

== Launch of Playmobil ==
Geobra Brandstätter was already producing plastic toys when Horst Brandstätter joined the company. However, in the early 1970s plastic became increasingly expensive. He commissioned inventor Hans Beck to find some new ideas. When Beck presented his first designs for his toy figures, Brandstätter was initially skeptical, commenting, "Herr Beck showed me these little figures, with no cars, no houses, no nothing!" However, he later understood that the proposal offered a much wider concept. His support of Hans Beck allowed the company to begin production on what became the popular toy Playmobil, prototypes of which had been developed by Beck at the company. The 1973 oil crisis necessitated the creation of a toy whose production required little solid plastic; he had asked Beck for "the maximum amount of play value for the minimum amount of plastic". Later, when asked what was special about the toy line, he said, "The special ingredient is the process it triggers in the minds of children. It fires their imaginations and they use the Playmobil figurines to make the stories they conjure up come to life". The first Playmobil figures were introduced in the toy market in 1974 and included construction workers, Native Americans and knights.

== Retirement and death ==
Brandstätter retired from the company in 2000, but continued to visit the offices and remained the company's sole shareholder. He was listed at number 1638 on the Forbes list of billionaires in 2015. After suffering from a short illness, he died at the age of 81 on 3 June 2015 at his home in Zirndorf, Bavaria. Upon his death, Brandstätter Group stated, "With Horst Brandstätter the Playmobil family loses not just its leader, proprietor and patriarch, but Germany's toy industry has lost one of its most distinguished personalities".

The 2019 film Playmobil: The Movie was dedicated to him in the film's closing credits.
