= Brandstätter Group =

German company in Bavaria

- Company type: Private
- Founded: 1876
- Headquarters: Zirndorf, Germany
- Key people: Andreas Brandstätter; Horst Brandstätter Melvin Brandstätter, John Brandstätter, Joseph Brandstätter, Jacob Brandstätter, Johnathan Brandstätter
- Products: Playmobil computer software hula hoops large plastic toys piggy banks telephones cash registers scales
- Website: http://www.playmobil.de

Logo of Playmobil, which is Brandstätter Group's best-known product

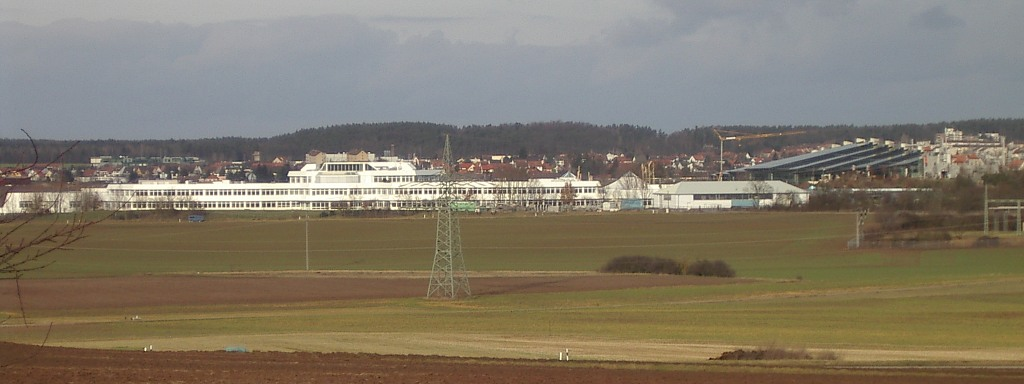
Headquarters and Playmobil FunPark in Zirndorf

Brandstätter Group (geobra Brandstätter GmbH & Co. KG) is a German company, headquartered in Zirndorf, Bavaria. The group is composed of toy company Playmobil, Playmobil 1.2.3 Ltd, Inmold Ltd, Hob Electronics Ltd, Hob Components Ltd, HOB Inc., HOB GmbH & Co KG, and Hob Software Ltd.

== History ==
In 1876, the company was founded by Andreas Brandstätter in Fürth, Bavaria and produced ornamental fittings and locks. By 1921, the company mainly was producing metal toys such as piggy banks, telephones, cash registers, and scales.

In 1954, production shifted to plastics and in the following years produced toys such as the Multi-Worker play-set. The Playmobil line of products was introduced in 1970 under Horst Brandstätter and marketed worldwide in 1975.

The Brandstätter Group produces exclusively in Europe, chiefly at its main factory in Dietenhofen, 25 km from Zirndorf, with a workforce of 750 people. Although Playmobil also has factories in Malta (700 employees), Spain and the Czech Republic, Horst Brandstätter expanded production in Germany, and invested heavily in the Dietenhofen factory. New products included the Lechuza self-watering planters.
