= Playmobil =

Toy line by Brandstätter Group

- Type: Plastic figures
- Invented by: Hans Beck
- Company: Geobra Brandstätter GmbH
- Country: Germany
- Availability: 1974–present
- Materials: Plastic; Rubber
- Official website

Playmobil (/pleɪmoʊˈbiːl/) is a German toy line produced by the Brandstätter Group (Geobra Brandstätter GmbH & Co KG), headquartered in Zirndorf, Germany. The signature Playmobil toy is a 7.5 cm (3.0 in) tall (1:24 scale) human figure with a smiling face. A wide range of accessories, buildings and vehicles, as well as many sorts of animals, are also part of the Playmobil line.

Playmobil toys are produced in themed series of sets as well as individual special figures and playsets. New products and product lines developed by a 50-strong development team are introduced frequently, and older sets are discontinued. Promotional and one-off products are sometimes produced in very limited quantities. These practices have helped give rise to a sizeable community of collectors. Collector activities extend beyond collecting and free-form play and include customization, miniature wargaming, the creation of photo stories and stop motion films, and using the toys as decoration.

== History ==
Playmobil was invented by German inventor Hans Beck (1929–2009), considered the "Father of Playmobil". Beck received training as a cabinetmaker and was also an avid hobbyist of model airplanes, a product he pitched to the company Geobra Brandstätter. Horst Brandstätter, the owner of the company, asked Beck to develop toy figures for children instead. (The company had originally been a producer of casket ornaments and handles.)

Beck spent three years from 1971 to 1974 developing what became Playmobil. Beck conducted research that allowed him to develop a toy that would not be too complex but would nevertheless be flexible. He felt that too much flexibility would get in the way of children's imaginations, and too much rigidity would cause frustration. The toy he conceived would fit in a child's hand and its facial design was based on children's drawings: a large head, a big smile, and no nose. "I would put the little figures in their hands without saying anything about what they were," Beck remarked. "They accepted them right away ... They invented little scenarios for them. They never grew tired of playing with them".

The 1973 oil crisis made it possible for Playmobil to be considered a viable product. The rising oil prices imposed on Geobra Brandstätter, for whom Beck worked as head of development, demanded that the company turn to products that required less solid plastic material than the hula hoops and other large plastic items the company had been producing as toys.

In 1974, the company put the first sets of knights, Native Americans, and construction workers on show in its display rooms. Initially, visitors were reluctant to accept the toy. Nevertheless, the toy was shown at the International Toy Fair in Nuremberg, which took place that same year. A Dutch firm agreed to buy a whole year's production. By the end of the year, Geobra Brandstätter had achieved sales of three million Deutschmarks with Playmobil—one-sixth of the company's total sales. Playmobil began to be sold worldwide in 1975, and by 2009, approximately 2.2 billion Playmobil figures had been sold. Playmobil’s revenue in 2008 was $589 million. Playmobil is a major competitor of Lego.

== Products ==
Playmobil toys are specifically aimed at children from the ages of four to twelve. The company believes that older children tend not to play with these types of toys and so they have resisted creating toys from less well-known historical time periods. Many adults own or collect Playmobil and make movies with the toys.

The first Playmobil sets were themed around Native Americans, construction workers and knights.

Playmobil hands were designed to be capable of gripping and holding objects. Earlier figures had arms of one piece. Since 1982 all figures have hands that also rotate at the wrist. Almost all Playmobil figures are unnamed, thus allowing children to invent their own characters. Exceptions to this include the many characters from the three Playmobil-inspired computer video games produced by Ubi Soft Montreal between 1998 and 1999, such as Alex, Hype and Laura, the protagonists from their respective games. The first figures used a chiseled out hairpiece with a button shape for adding headgear, until a later redesign gave the hairpiece a more natural rounded shape, also prompting a redesign of the headgear. The first female figures were distinguished by hairstyle and a wider chestpiece suggesting a skirt, until a redesign replaced the chestpiece with more displayed breasts, smaller waists and slightly thinner arms.

Most Playmobil sets require some assembly by the owner. Buildings especially come with detailed instructions for putting them together. Playmobil building parts were originally designed to fit together using a system of tabs and slots known as "Steck-System". In recent years a new construction system has been introduced that dispenses with the tabs and instead uses small connector pieces and a special tool. This is known as "System-X" and is now the standard Playmobil construction system, Steck-System having been retired except for special reissues.

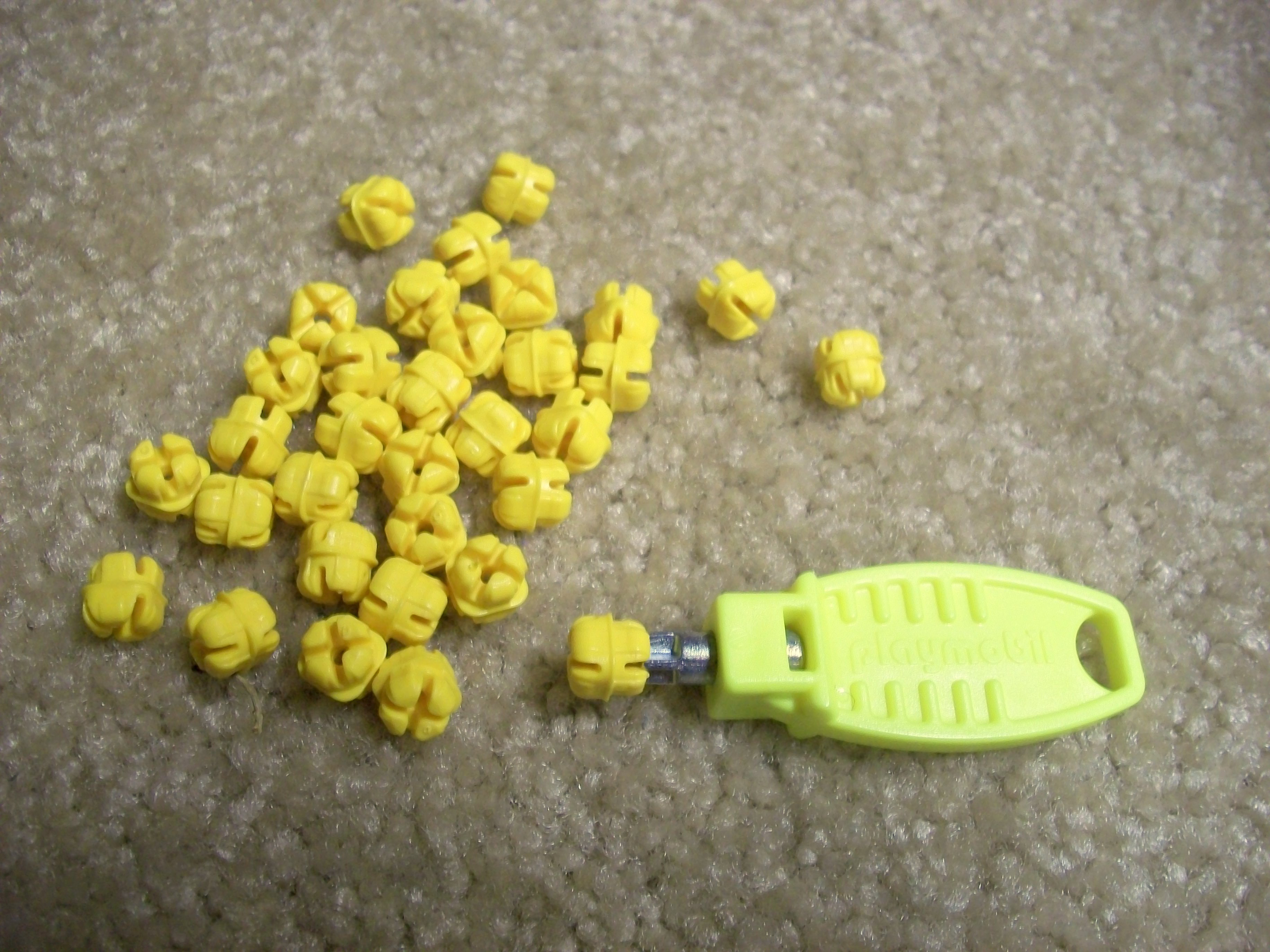
Connector pieces and special tool used in System-X.

Over the years, some proposed sets have included Chinese Railroad Workers and a Grave Digger for the Western theme, as well as a Medieval Torture Room. Prototypes were made. However, these sets were considered insensitive and inappropriate for young children, and were never released. There are however sets including ghosts and a mummy containing a skeleton.

Playmobil pop-up books, in which buildings and settings corresponded to the height of actual Playmobil figures, were sold for a time, as well as a series of comic books, coloring books, and puzzles.

In early 2019, a prototype for a product named Playmobil Pro was posted on LinkedIn. The product line introduced the Playmobil figure into corporate settings, targeting adult professionals in place of children. The concept aimed to rival Lego Serious Play, by incorporating the Playmobil figure into a modelling kit used for corporate creative workshops. The Playmobil Pro figures differ from classic Playmobil figures by their white colouration and simple designs. Playmobil Pro was made available in the United States in January 2020.

=== Licensing ===
A number of different companies were licensed throughout Europe and Latin America to produce and distribute Playmobil figures:

In Spain, figures were produced by the leading dollmaker Famosa, and marketed as "los clicks de Famobil". Spanish packages listed the quantity of male dolls (clicks) and females (clacks). Females were distinguished by hairstyle and a wider chestpiece suggesting a skirt.

Greek figures were produced during the 1970s by a company called Lyra.

In Argentina Playmobil is licensed by Antex, for distribution in all South American markets. Previously Playmobil was licensed through a number of different companies, including Brazil's Trol, Estrela and Industria de Brinquedos do Amazonas, and Peru's BASA.

From 1976 to 1980, Playmobil was licensed by Louis Marx and Company in the United Kingdom and sold under the brand name Playpeople.

Playmobil was introduced to the United States by Mattel and Schaper. In 1982, Schaper arranged a promotion to distribute Playmobil toys nationwide as in McDonald's Happy Meals. The five Playmobil toys that were to be included in the promotion were a Sheriff, an Indian, a Sheriff's Horse, an Umbrella Girl and a Farmer. Approximately 10 million of the Sheriff and Indian Playmobil toys were distributed from October 22 through November 1, 1982. Before the other toys could be distributed McDonald's ceased distribution and promotion of Playmobil at its restaurants after tests showed that the toy failed to comply with Consumer Product Safety Commission standards designed to prevent children under three from choking on dangerous items. (The Playmobil toys were not involved in any reported choking incidents.) McDonald's customers with children under three who received these toys were advised to discontinue their use and return the toys to a McDonald's in exchange for a dessert, a cone, or a refund.

In 2004, BMW licensed the familiar Playmobil look and feel to release an exclusive BMW Z4 done in Playmobil scale. It also came with two Playmobil passengers. Originally, the only way to get one of these Z4s (available in deep red or blue) was to take a test drive at a BMW dealership in Germany. Shortly thereafter, versions in a pale yellow or eggshell blue were available in European toy stores. Though not manufactured by Playmobil, they were officially licensed.This has subsequently been copied by Mercedes-Benz, Volkswagen, Audi, Citroen, Porsche and Mini Cooper. This has been done in similar formats. Read more in the Current Themes Section.

=== Bootlegs and unauthorized figures ===
In 1978, Schenk, a German-Hungarian firm, began reproducing bootleg Playmobil figures. They had not received any authorization or license from geobra Brandstätter. Schenk produced exact copies of the original toy, though some sets were modified to create new types of sets, usually military, from Hungarian history. Thus, Schenk produced the Hussar (Huszár), from the period of the Hungarian War of Independence as well as the Hungarian hussar series (Magyar huszár sorozat). Other sets included the Austrian soldier (Osztrák), Turkish soldier (Török), William Tell (Tell Vilmos), and the Hunyadi series (Hunyadi sorozat).

Schenk figures, like the early Playmobil figures, do not have moveable hands, and unlike the Playmobil horses, the Schenk horses do not have moveable heads. Schenk figures also bear different colors from their Playmobil counterparts. They were also made with inferior plastic. Following the collapse of communism, a 1995 court ruling forbade the manufacture and distribution of the Schenk figures. The owner of Schenk, Károly Schenk, was allowed to sell off his remaining toy figures only in Hungary until March 1996. However, Schenk bootlegs may still be available in toy shops in Hungary.

Bootleg sets also have been manufactured in China. These sets are not marketed as Playmobil, though they are identical in terms of appearance (but not in regards to quality). Sets include a "Noshery" (fast food eatery), "Pirate Island", and medieval figures.

=== European factories ===
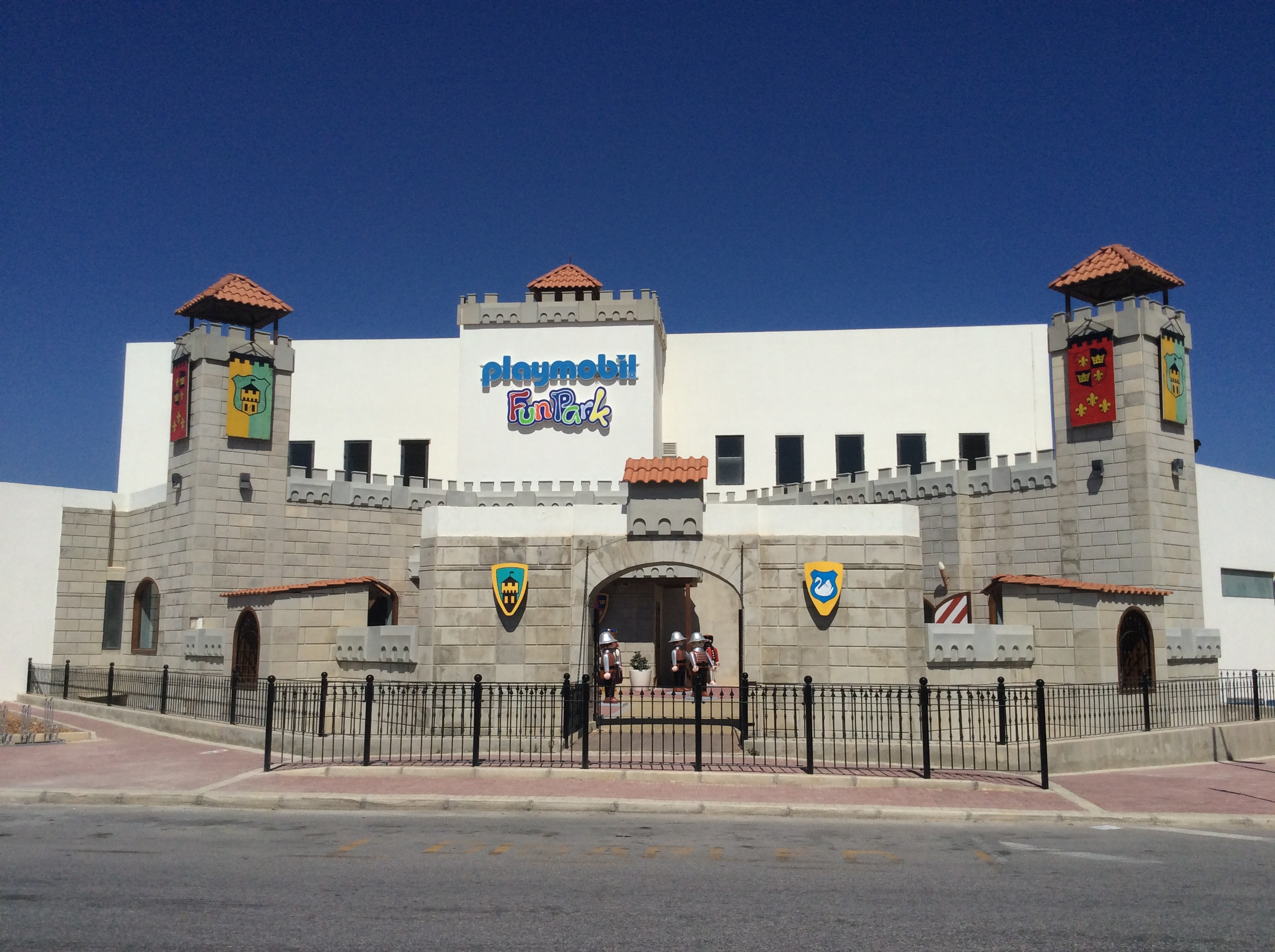
Playmobil Park, Malta.

There are currently three main factories in Europe: Germany, Malta, and Spain. Each location specializes in a particular area of manufacturing and parts that are needed to assemble a set are delivered to the destination where the items will be placed together and put in their final packaging before sale. Malta specializes in making the characters and a few accessories, Spain specializes in accessories, and Germany makes the bigger items such as ships and castles.

== Distribution ==
New Playmobil sets are released over a two-year period, with the non-export markets getting new sets first, then the export markets receiving them a year later. This is done so that Playmobil will only have to make one very expensive mold for each new piece, and still be able to manufacture the initial stock of the new set. This first stock is what initially stocks store shelves; afterwards Playmobil makes smaller quantities to refill shelves in accordance with demand. In order to produce enough sets to release them to the entire world at the same time, Playmobil would need to buy two of each mold. Eventually, as production for the piece slowed down, the second mold would be useless.

Non-export markets:

- Germany
- Austria
- Switzerland
- Belgium
- Netherlands
- Luxembourg
- Denmark
- Sweden
- Norway

Export markets:

- All countries not in previous list

== Collectibles, Themes & Figures ==
A huge selection of themes that include Circus, Construction, Farming, Firefighters, Camping, Hospitals, Modern Homes, Preschools, Policemen, Rescue Squad, Schools, Horse Stables, a Rainbow Castle, Mermaids, Santa Claus, and Tiny Houses.

Sets and Figurines exclusive for kids 3 and under are commonly known as Playmobil Jr., also known as 1.2.3.

Aqua toys are also exclusive for kids 3 and under, except they are exclusive to bathtime and kiddie pools.

There is a Disney theme to the Jr. section, including Mickey and Minnie from Mickey Mouse, Pooh, Piglet and Tigger from Winnie the Pooh, Ariel and Flounder from The Little Mermaid, Belle from Beauty and the Beast, Moana and Heihei from Moana, and Tinker Bell from Peter Pan.

Interest of Category includes Action-Adventure, Animals, Cars, Dinosaurs and Dragons, Everyday Heroes, Family Life, Fantasy, History, Movies and TV series and Princess.

Advent Calendars can also be sold at select stores.

SpecialPlus figurines, Promo Packs, Starter Packs or a theme called Playmo-Friends could also contain ones from Halloween, Christmas, Carníval, or other occasions, which will sometimes include the Summer Olympics, Winter Olympics, the World Cup, or other major events in the world.

Boxsets can either be sold in five sizes: XS, S, M, L, and XL.

As of 2026, DuoPack Sets can now be sold with two separate figurines in one box.

Custom Figurines can now be collectible in different colors: blue for boys, and pink for girls.

The website will be updated to include more sets in development at Playmobil factories.

=== Themes currently in production ===
Each set will be listed on the Playmobil shop either for sale or out of stock.

The following sets, best sellers, or Playmobil Plus sets were produced as of March 2026:

==== Intended for Younger Audiences (3 and under) ====
- Playmobil Jr./1.2.3

==== Playmobil World/Adventures (4 years and up) ====
- Animals and Friends
- Barbie
- City Action
- City Life
- Collector Cars (see below)
- Color by Crayola
- Country
- Dinos
- Dollhouse
- Duo Packs
- European Space Agency
- Fantasy and Magic
- Ferrari 250 GTO
- Ford F-150 Raptor
- FunStars
- Gift Sets
- Heroes
- History
- I Love Horses
- Knights
- Magic Unicorns
- Miraculous: Tales of Ladybug & Cat Noir
- Monster High
- My Life
- NHL
- Off Road Cars
- Pirates
- Porsche 911 and Carrera GT
- Princess
- Princess Magic
- Promo Packs
- SKY TRAILS
- Sports
- Vespa 150 Sprint Veloce
- Volkswagen T1 Minibus
- WWE
- Western
- WilTopia

==== Playmobil Vehicles/Collector Cars ====
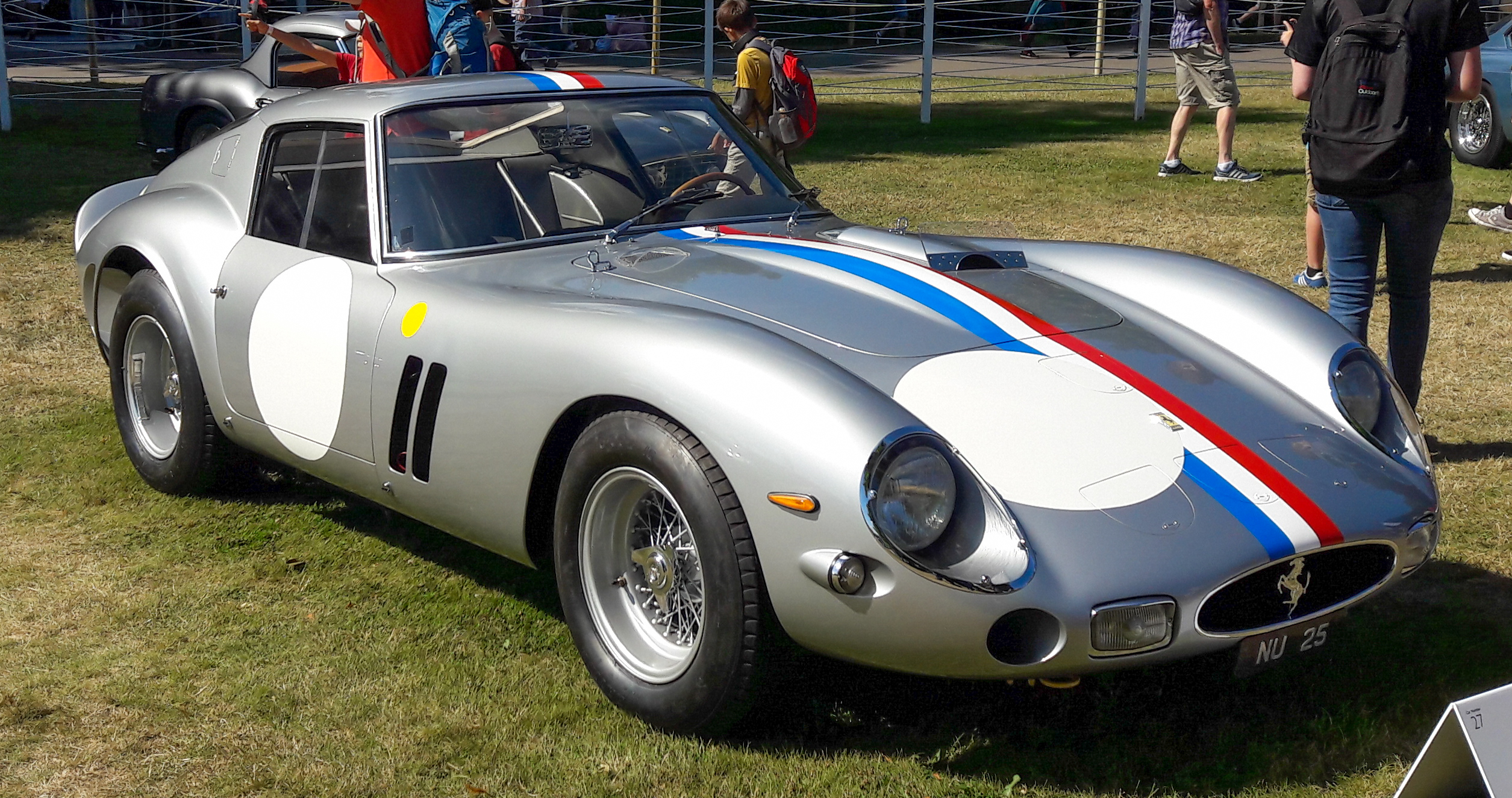
Ferrari 250 GTO

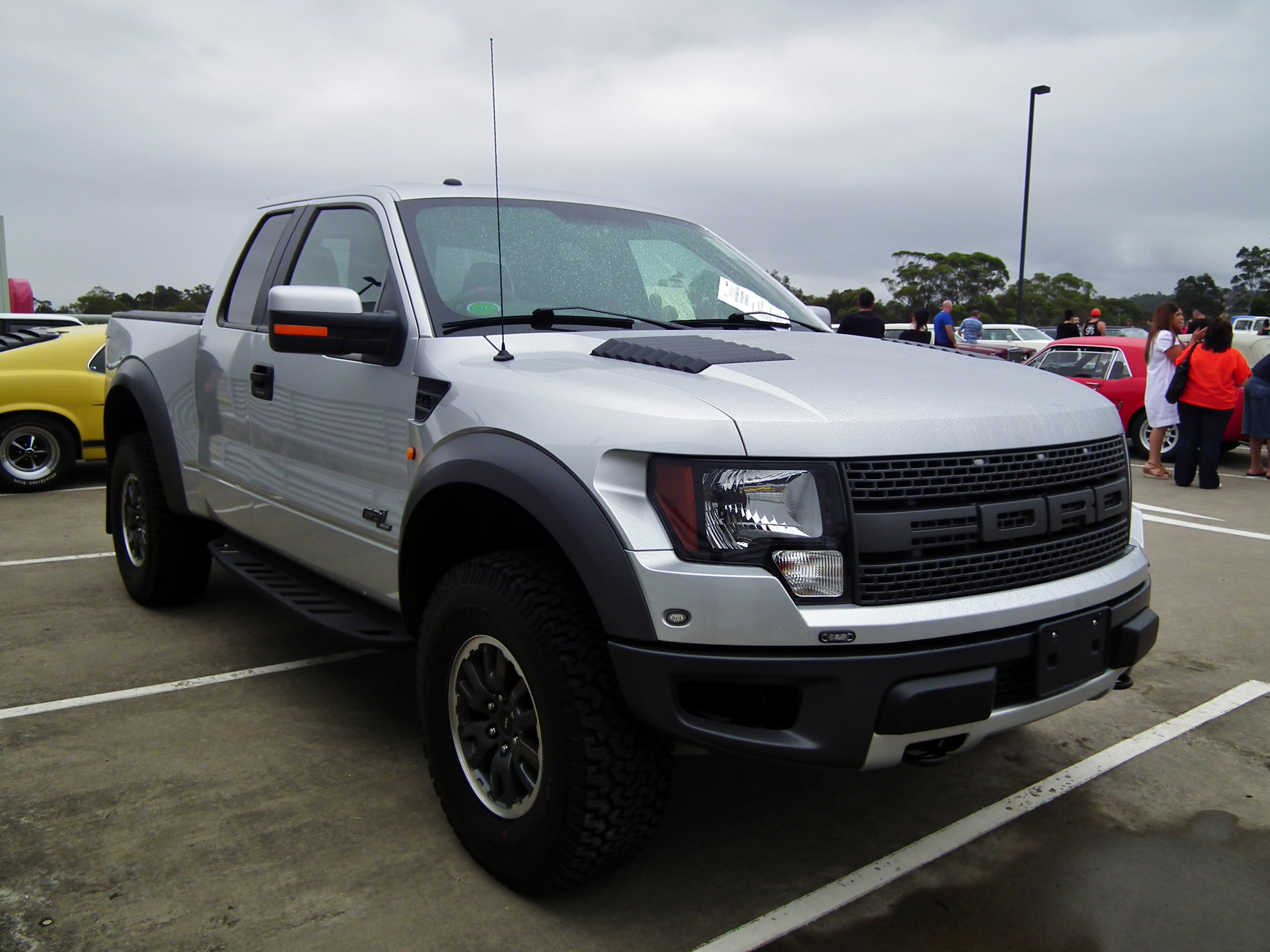
Ford F-150 Raptor

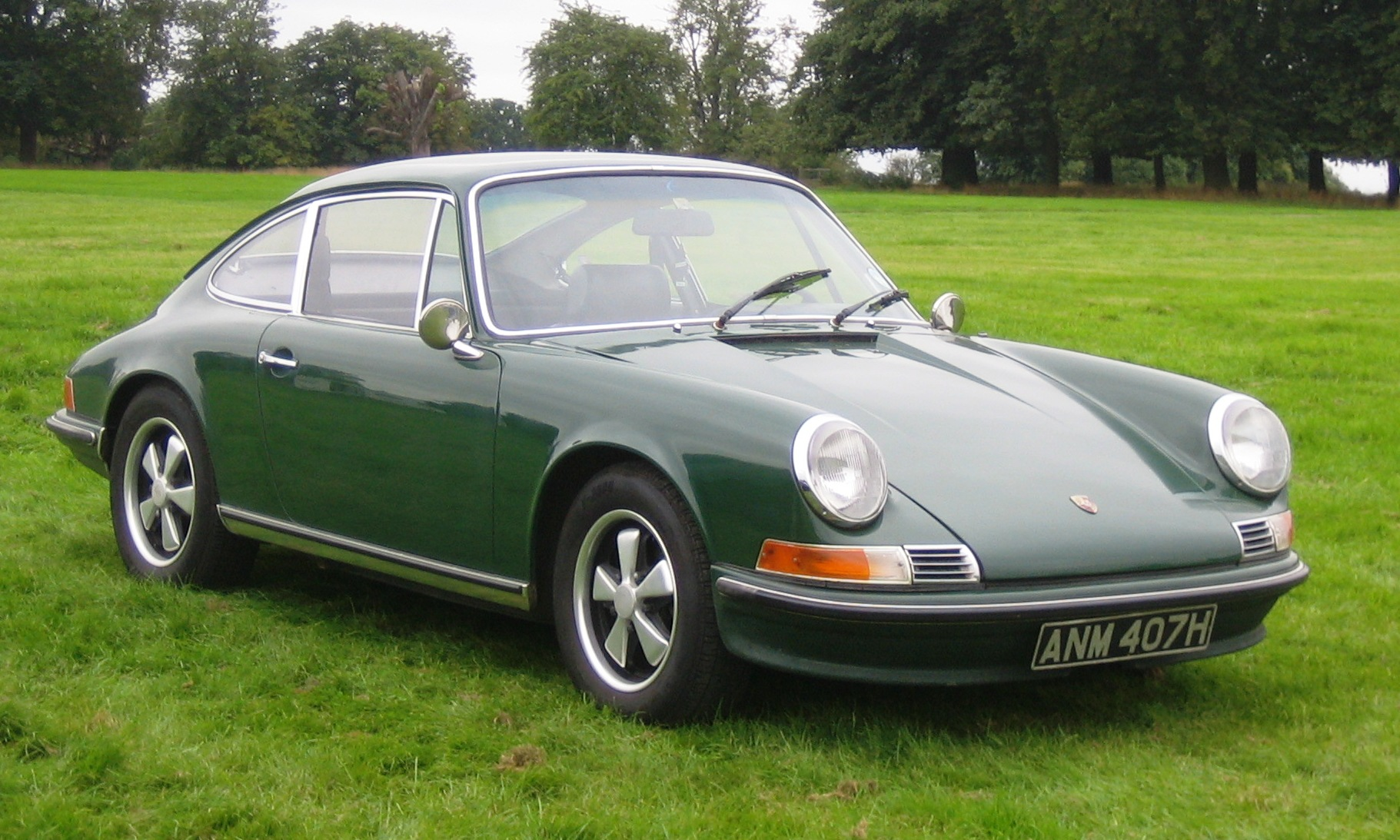
Porsche 911

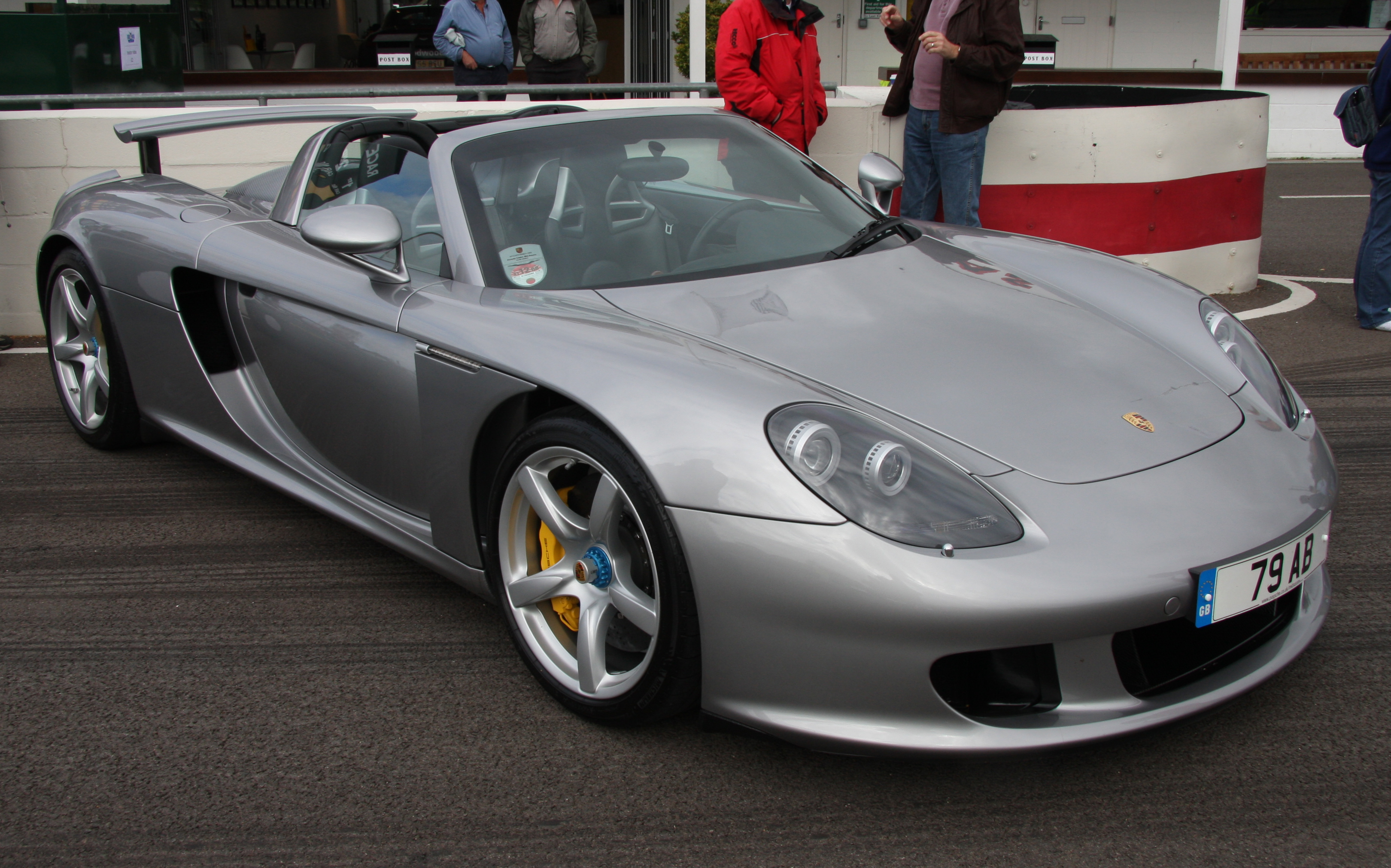
Porsche Carrera GT

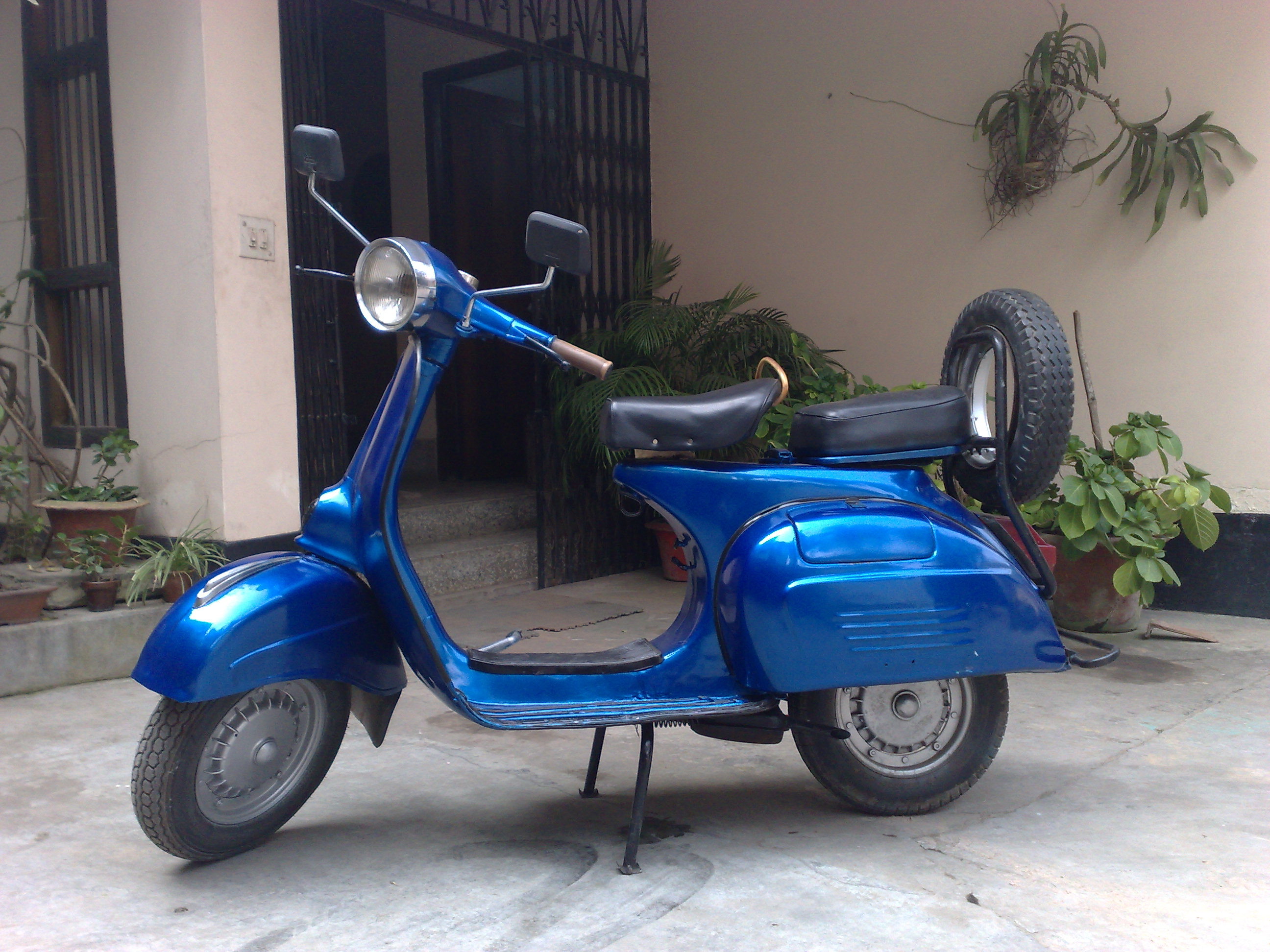
Vespa 150 Sprint Veloce

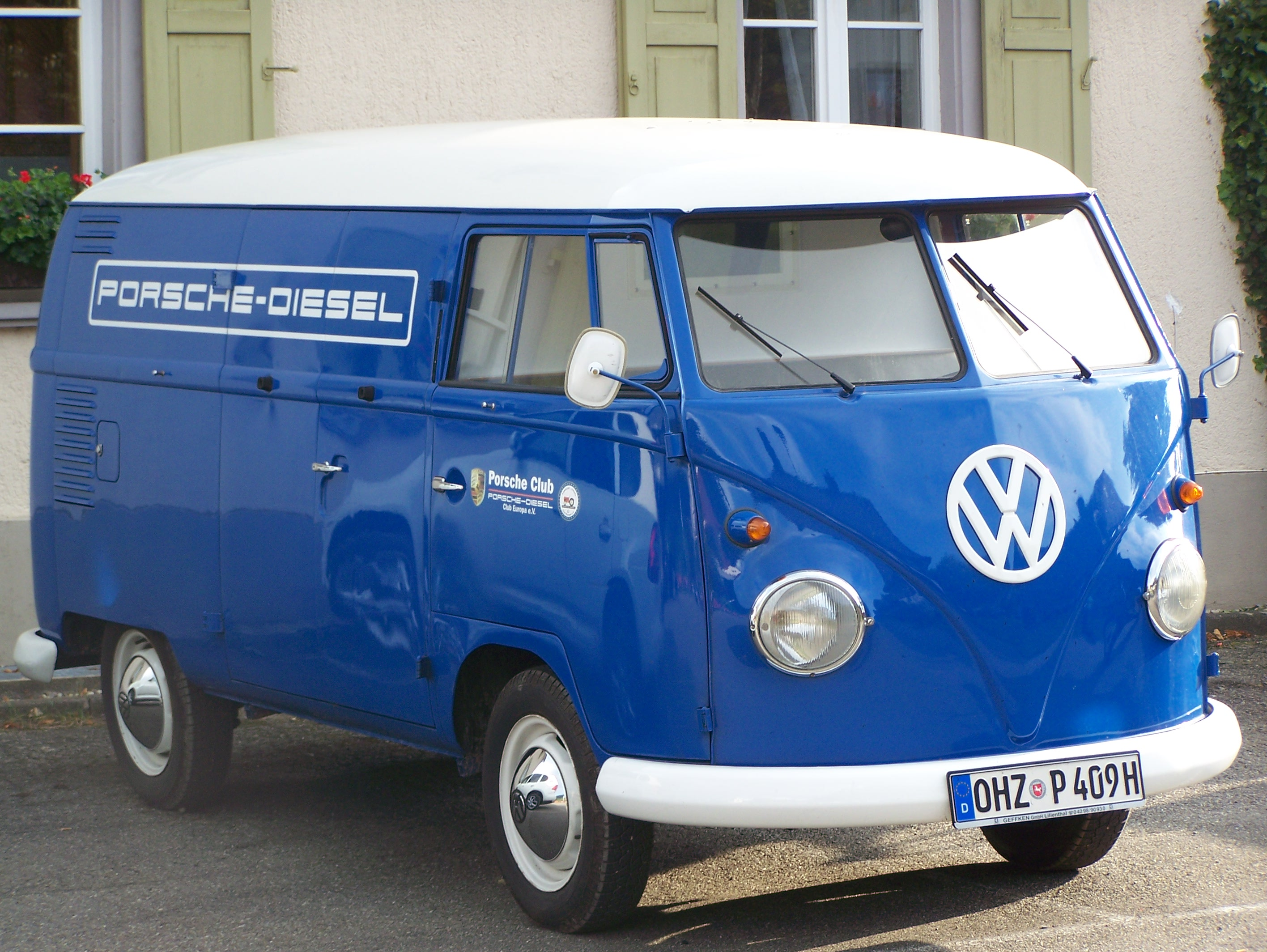
Volkswagen T1 Minibus

The most money to be spent on a box set as of 2026 was $300.

The fastest selling Playmobil figurine is of Martin Luther. It was released to commemorate 500 year anniversary of Ninety-five Theses, which sparked the start of the Reformation. The first edition of 34,000 figurines sold out in three days.

== FunParks and FunStores ==
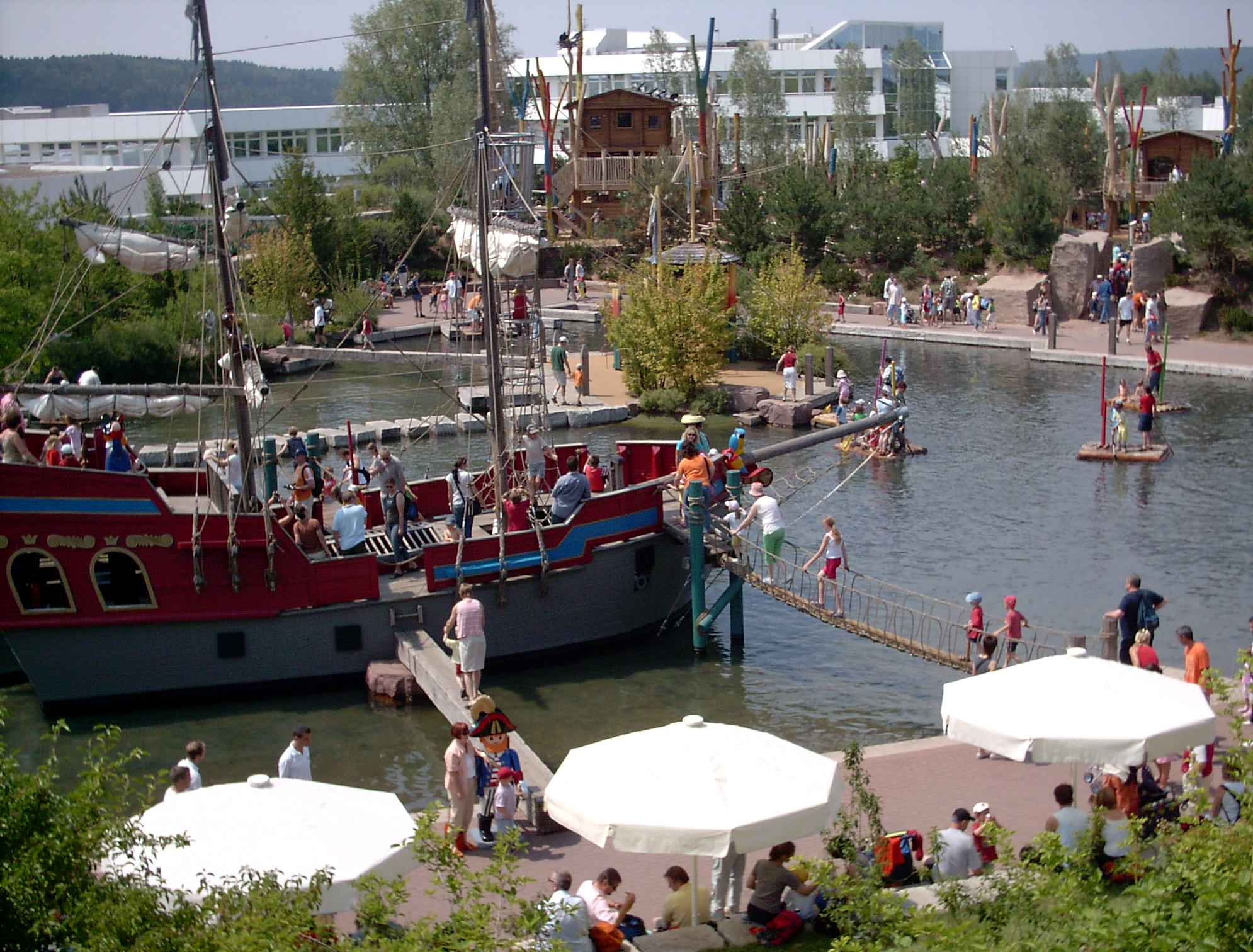
The life-sized Playmobil pirate ship in FunPark in Zirndorf, Germany

There are a number of Playmobil amusement parks, called FunParks, that feature play areas and events themed around Playmobil toys. There are also FunStores within FunParks and, formerly, in other locations. FunStores are dedicated Playmobil shops that carry full lines of current Playmobil releases.

FunPark and FunStore locations include:

- FunPark Athens, Greece (mostly toys vs. outside play areas as in the Malta and Zirndorf parks)
- FunPark Ħal Far, Malta—part of the Playmobil Park manufacturing facility
- FunPark Palm Beach Gardens, Florida, US (permanently closed, It was the first and only Playmobil Funpark outside Europe)
- FunPark Fresnes, France (small, mostly toys, permanently closed)
- FunPark Zirndorf, Germany—next to the Playmobil headquarters

== Films ==
- The Secret of Pirate Island (2009): A 3D animated interactive DVD based on the Pirates theme.
- A live-action/animated feature film based on the characters, entitled Playmobil: The Movie, produced by French studios On Entertainment, Wild Bunch and Pathé (initially set to be distributed by Global Road Entertainment in the United States, prior to the company's September 2018 bankruptcy filing; STX Entertainment picked up the US distribution rights), was released in December 2019. Animator Lino DiSalvo makes his directorial debut with the movie.

However, it proved to be a major box-office bomb. According to Deadline Hollywood, Playmobil was released only weeks after Frozen II and used a variable pricing strategy where STX and many theater chains offered $5 tickets. Originally projected to gross $600,000–$800,000 on its opening day, Playmobil grossed just $167,000, making it the third-worst opening day of all time for a 2,000-plus theatre production, behind Delgo (2008) and The Oogieloves in the Big Balloon Adventure (2012); fourth if counting the 2014 re-release of Saw (2004) and 24th if also including films with between 1,000 and 1,999 theaters. It went on to gross $660,000 in its opening weekend (an average of $287 per-venue), the fourth-worst of all-time.

Shortly after the weekend, Grayson responded that STX would use variable pricing in their future projects: "we have already learned from this experiment. And we will continue to learn more and will tweak it for the future so it can be the benefit to the industry that we know it can be." While the film's several worldwide distributors recouped TV sale money, they also financed it via pre-sales and thus face losses. Rebecca Rubin, a Variety writer, attributed the low box office to the Playmobil brand being far less popular than Lego.

== TV series ==
- In 2014, a CGI animated TV series inspired by Playmobil figures titled Super 4 was co-produced by Method Animation, PGS Entertainment and Morgen Studios. The series has been broadcast on Boomerang in Latin America, CITV in Britain and Cartoon Network in Italy and Netflix and KidsClick in the United States.
- On 4 November 2020, a CGI animated TV series titled Novelmore launched on the Playmobil YouTube channel and on YouTube Kids. Comprising 26 episodes, the series centres around the Knights of Novelmore and their battle for a magical armour.
- On 2 May 2021, an animated series launched titled Dino Rise: The Legend of Dino Rock. The storyline focuses on a group of friends that teams up with a T Rex and the Keepers of Dino Rock to save the world from the Comet Corporation.
- At the same time, the latest PLAYMOBIL series experience starts on October 8 on YouTube and YouTube Kids. The intrigue:When the enigmatic Bat Fairies suddenly appear and, led by Bat Fairy Noxana, begin to steal crystals from Ayuma's magical energy source, the idyll in the fairy forest is in great danger. Will the young fairies manage to protect their world.
- DUCK ON CALL: a separate series in high-quality CGI animation on YouTube and YouTube Kids takes the little fans to Playmoville and tells about the experiences of the lovable rescuers with a lot of humor. The pilot episode is scheduled for March and will introduce Ducklas and the young rescue team, with additional episodes coming in June.

== Video games ==
- Alex Builds His Farm: A game for children 7–10 in which the player helps Alex on his farm.
- Hype: The Time Quest: An adventure game set in the Knights theme.
- Laura's Happy Adventures: An adventure game set in the Doll's House theme.
- Playmobil: Circus: for Wii
- Playmobil: Knights: for Nintendo DS
- Playmobil: Pirates: for Nintendo DS
- Playmobil: Top Agents: for Nintendo DS

== See also ==
- Kubrick (toy)
- Minifigure
- Minimates
