= Great Marlow (constituency) =

Parliamentary constituency in the United Kingdom 1801-1885

- Former borough constituency for the House of Commons

1624–1885
- Seats: two (1311-1868); one (1868-1885)
- Replaced by: Aylesbury

Great Marlow, sometimes simply called Marlow, was a parliamentary borough in Buckinghamshire. It elected two Members of Parliament (MPs) to the House of Commons of England between 1301 and 1307, and again from 1624 until 1707, then in the House of Commons of Great Britain from 1707 to 1800 and finally in the House of Commons of the United Kingdom from 1801 to 1868. It elected one member from 1868 until 1885, when the borough was abolished.

== History ==
In the 17th century a solicitor named William Hakewill, of Lincoln's Inn, rediscovered ancient writs confirming that Amersham, Great Marlow, and Wendover had all sent members to Parliament in the past, and succeeded in re-establishing their privileges (despite the opposition of James I), so that they resumed electing members from the Parliament of 1624. Hakewill himself was elected for Amersham in 1624.

== Members of Parliament ==
=== MPs 1624–1640 ===
Year	First member	Second member
Constituency re-enfranchised by Parliament in 1624
1624	Henry Borlase	Thomas Cotton
1625	John Backhouse	Thomas Cotton
1626	John Backhouse	Sir William Hicks, 1st Baronet
1628	Sir John Backhouse	Miles Hobart

=== MPs 1640–1868 ===
Year	First member	First party	Second member	Second party
April 1640	John Borlase	Royalist	Sir William Hicks	
November 1640 (Note: The election of Borlase and Hippesley to the Long Parliament were declared void.)	John Borlase	Royalist	Gabriel Hippesley	
1640	Bulstrode Whitelocke	Parliamentarian	Peregrine Hoby	Parliamentarian
December 1648	Bulstrode Whitelocke	Parliamentarian	Hoby excluded in Pride's Purge - seat vacant	
1653	Great Marlow was unrepresented in the Barebones Parliament and the First and Second Parliaments of the Protectorate			
January 1659	William Borlase		Peregrine Hoby	
May 1659	Bulstrode Whitelocke		One seat vacant	
April 1660	William Borlase		Peregrine Hoby	
1666	Charles Cheyne		Peregrine Hoby	
1679	John Borlase		Sir Humphrey Winch	
1681	John Borlase		Thomas Hoby	
1685	Sir John Borlase		Sir Humphrey Winch	
January 1689	Sir John Borlase		The Viscount Falkland	
February 1689	John Hoby		The Viscount Falkland	
December 1689	Sir William Whitelock		The Viscount Falkland	
1690	Sir William Whitelock		James Chase	
1695	Sir James Etheridge		James Chase	
1710	Sir James Etheridge		George Bruere	
1715	The Lord Shelburne		George Bruere	
1722	Edmund Waller		Sir John Guise	
1727	Edmund Waller		John Clavering	
1731	Edmund Waller		George Robinson (Note: Expelled from the House of Commons for "indirect and fraudulent Practices in the Affairs of the Charitable Corporation, and for having never attended the Service of the House, although required to do so".)	
1732 by-election	Edmund Waller		Sir Thomas Hoby	
1741	Samuel Tufnell		Sir Thomas Hoby	
1744 by-election	Samuel Tufnell		William Ockenden	
1747	Merrick Burrell		William Ockenden	
1754	Charles Churchill		Daniel Moore	
1761	William Clayton (elder)		William Mathew Burt	
1768	William Clayton (elder)		William Dickinson	
1774	William Clayton (elder)		(Sir) John Borlase Warren (Note: Created a baronet, 1775)	
1783 by-election	William Clayton (later 4th Bt)		(Sir) John Borlase Warren	
1784	William Clayton (later 4th Bt)		Captain Sir Thomas Rich	
1790	Thomas Williams	Tory	William Lee-Antonie	Whig
1796	Thomas Williams	Tory	Owen Williams	Whig
1802 by-election	Pascoe Grenfell	Whig	Owen Williams	Whig
1820	Thomas Peers Williams	Whig	Owen Williams	Whig
1832	Thomas Peers Williams	Tory	(Sir) William Clayton (Note: At the 1841 general election (Sir) William Clayton, who succeeded as baronet in January 1834, was initially declared re-elected by 1 vote in 1841, but on petition and after scrutiny his election was declared void and his opponent, Hampden, was declared elected instead.)	Whig
1834	Thomas Peers Williams	Conservative	(Sir) William Clayton	Whig
1842	Thomas Peers Williams	Conservative	Renn Hampden	Conservative
1847	Thomas Peers Williams	Conservative	Brownlow William Knox	Conservative
1868	Representation reduced to one member			

=== MPs 1868–1885 ===
Election	Member	Party
1868	Thomas Owen Wethered	Conservative
1880	Owen Williams	Conservative
1885	Constituency abolished	

== Election results ==
=== Elections in the 1830s ===
General election 1830: Great Marlow
Party	Candidate	Votes	%	±%
Whig	Owen Williams	209	36.5	
Whig	Thomas Peers Williams	192	33.6	
Whig	William Clayton	171	29.9	
Majority		21	3.7	
Turnout		360	c. 90.0	
Registered electors		c. 400		
Whig hold		Swing		
Whig hold		Swing		

General election 1831: Great Marlow
Party	Candidate	Votes	%	±%
Tory	Owen Williams	196	34.1	New
Tory	Thomas Peers Williams	192	33.4	New
Whig	William Clayton	187	32.5	+2.6
Majority		5	0.9	−2.8
Turnout		374	c. 93.5	c. +3.5
Registered electors		c. 400		
Tory gain from Whig		Swing	−1.9	
Tory gain from Whig		Swing	−0.8	

Owen Williams' death caused a by-election.

By-election, 3 March 1832: Great Marlow
Party	Candidate	Votes	%
Whig	William Clayton	Unopposed	
Whig gain from Tory			

General election 1832: Great Marlow
Party	Candidate	Votes	%
Tory	Thomas Peers Williams	Unopposed	
Whig	William Clayton	Unopposed	
Registered electors		457	
Tory hold			
Whig gain from Tory			

General election 1835: Great Marlow
Party	Candidate	Votes	%
Whig	William Clayton	201	47.9
Conservative	Thomas Peers Williams	185	44.0
Radical	William Carpenter	34	8.1
Turnout		240	64.3
Registered electors		373	
Majority		16	3.9
Whig hold			
Majority		151	35.9
Conservative hold			

General election 1837: Great Marlow
Party	Candidate	Votes	%
Whig	William Clayton	Unopposed	
Conservative	Thomas Peers Williams	Unopposed	
Registered electors		369	
Whig hold			
Conservative hold			

=== Elections in the 1840s ===
General election 1841: Great Marlow
Party	Candidate	Votes	%	±%
Conservative	Thomas Peers Williams	233	40.7	N/A
Whig	William Clayton	170	29.7	N/A
Conservative	Renn Hampden	169	29.5	N/A
Turnout		333	90.2	N/A
Registered electors		354		
Majority		63	11.0	N/A
Conservative hold		Swing	N/A	
Majority		1	0.2	N/A
Whig hold		Swing		

On petition, Clayton was unseated on 11 April 1842 due to bribery and Hampden was declared elected in his place.

General election 1847: Great Marlow
Party	Candidate	Votes	%	±%
Conservative	Thomas Peers Williams	238	41.2	+0.5
Conservative	Renn Hampden	178	30.8	+1.3
Whig	William Clayton	161	27.9	−0.8
Majority		17	2.9	−8.1
Turnout		289 (est)	77.8 (est)	−12.4
Registered electors		371		
Conservative hold		Swing	+0.5	
Conservative gain from Whig		Swing	+0.9	

=== Elections in the 1850s ===
General election 1852: Great Marlow
Party	Candidate	Votes	%	±%
Conservative	Thomas Peers Williams	242	45.1	+3.9
Conservative	Brownlow William Knox	198	36.9	+6.1
Whig	Jacob Bell	96	17.9	−10.0
Majority		102	19.0	+16.1
Turnout		316 (est)	89.3 (est)	+11.5
Registered electors		354		
Conservative hold		Swing	+4.5	
Conservative hold		Swing	+5.6	

General election 1857: Great Marlow
Party	Candidate	Votes	%	±%
Conservative	Brownlow William Knox	Unopposed		
Conservative	Thomas Peers Williams	Unopposed		
Registered electors		343		
Conservative hold				
Conservative hold				

General election 1859: Great Marlow
Party	Candidate	Votes	%	±%
Conservative	Thomas Peers Williams	229	43.7	N/A
Conservative	Brownlow William Knox	175	33.4	N/A
Liberal	John Webb Probyn	120	22.9	New
Majority		55	10.5	N/A
Turnout		322 (est)	94.7 (est)	N/A
Registered electors		354		
Conservative hold		Swing	N/A	
Conservative hold		Swing	N/A	

=== Elections in the 1860s ===
General election 1865: Great Marlow
Party	Candidate	Votes	%	±%
Conservative	Brownlow William Knox	Unopposed		
Conservative	Thomas Peers Williams	Unopposed		
Registered electors		349		
Conservative hold				
Conservative hold				

Seat reduced to one member

General election 1868: Great Marlow
Party	Candidate	Votes	%	±%
Conservative	Thomas Owen Wethered	345	52.4	N/A
Liberal	Edmund Verney	314	47.6	New
Majority		31	4.8	N/A
Turnout		659	86.7	N/A
Registered electors		760		
Conservative hold				

=== Elections in the 1870s ===
General election 1874: Great Marlow
Party	Candidate	Votes	%	±%
Conservative	Thomas Owen Wethered	Unopposed		
Registered electors		856		
Conservative hold				

=== Elections in the 1880s ===
General election 1880: Great Marlow
Party	Candidate	Votes	%	±%
Conservative	Owen Williams	505	58.7	N/A
Liberal	James Olliff Griffits	355	41.3	New
Majority		150	17.4	N/A
Turnout		860	91.4	N/A
Registered electors		941		
Conservative hold		Swing	N/A	
