= Thomas Peers Williams =

British politician (1795–1875)

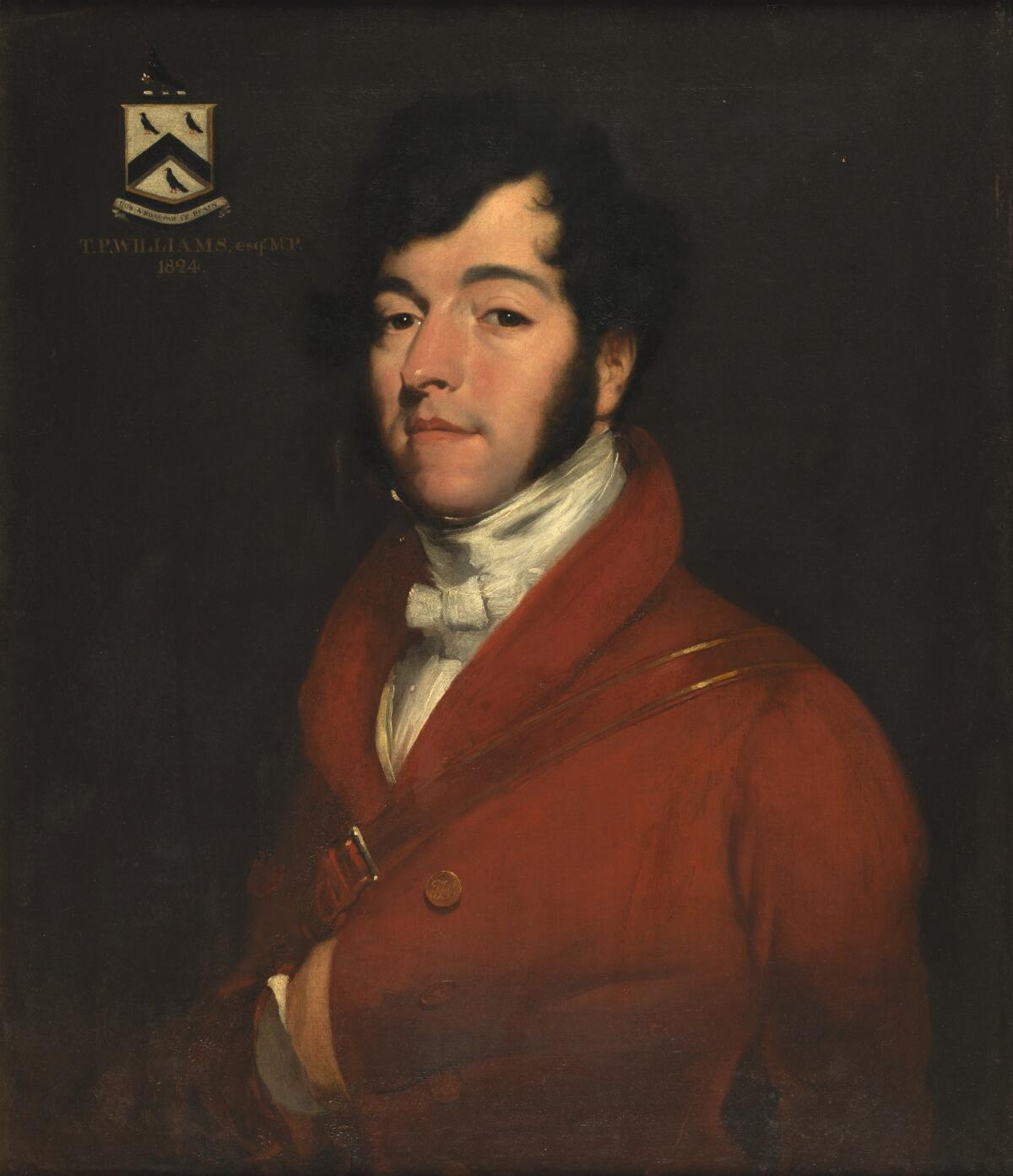
- Portrait of Williams

Member of Parliament for Great Marlow
- In office 1820–1868 Serving with Owen Williams, William Clayton, Renn Hampden, Brownlow William Knox
- Preceded by: Pascoe Grenfell; Owen Williams
- Succeeded by: Thomas Owen Wethered

Personal details
- Born: 27 March 1795
- Died: 8 September 1875 (aged 80)
- Spouse: Emily Bacon (after 1835)
- Relations: Thomas Williams (grandfather)
- Parent(s): Owen Williams; Margaret Hughes
- Education: Christ Church, Oxford

Thomas Peers Williams (27 March 1795 – 8 September 1875) was a British politician, military officer and landowner who was a member of Parliament for Great Marlow from 1820 to 1868. He was Father of the House of Commons from December 1867 to 1868.

== Early life ==
Williams was the son of Owen Williams (1764–1832), MP for Great Marlow, and the former Margaret Hughes (d. 1821), a member of the Hughes family which owned a large interest in the Parys Mountain copper mine. Three of his sister were married to members of the House of Lords, two others to sons of lords.

His grandfather Thomas Williams was a prominent attorney and active in the copper industry. His great-grandfather was Owen Williams of Cefn Coch, Llansadwrn, who owned also Tregarnedd and Treffos. Williams' grandfather was retained by the Hughes and Lewis families to act for their in very acrimonious litigation with Sir Nicholas Bayly (father of the Earl of Uxbridge) in relation to the Parys Mountain copper mine. When the litigation ended in 1778, Williams' grandfather became an active partner in the mine.

Williams matriculated at Christ Church, Oxford in 1813.

== Career ==
In 1820, he became an MP for the constituency of Great Marlow (usually known as Marlow). The seat had been held by his grandfather from 1790 until his death in 1802 when his own father took up the seat, serving until his death in 1832. Williams retired in 1868 after serving 48 years. In the last year, he was Father of the House of Commons from December 1867, succeeding Henry Cecil Lowther who had entered the House in 1812 and retired as MP in 1867. His eldest son, Owen Lewis Cope Williams, also served as MP for Great Marlow 1880 from 1885, the fourth generation of his family to hold the Great Marlow seat with intervals, from 1790 until 1885, nearly a hundred years.

He was commissioned as a Captain in the Royal Anglesey Light Infantry Militia on 10 April 1835, and was promoted to Lieutenant-Colonel Commandant on 10 March 1853.

Williams' family gradually released their hold on the copper industry and, today, are chiefly remembered as owners of the Craig-y-don estate, Members of Parliament, and the founders of banks.

=== Estates ===
Williams was a considerable landowner in Wales, as recorded with 7,010 acres (28.4 km^{2}) in 1873. He owned estates in Anglesey and Berkshire, and elsewhere. He owned a house and estate called Craig-y-Don, near Beaumaris on Anglesey. He also had a residence at Temple House, Bisham, Berkshire, near Marlow. He was active in the Anglesey Hunt.

== Personal life ==
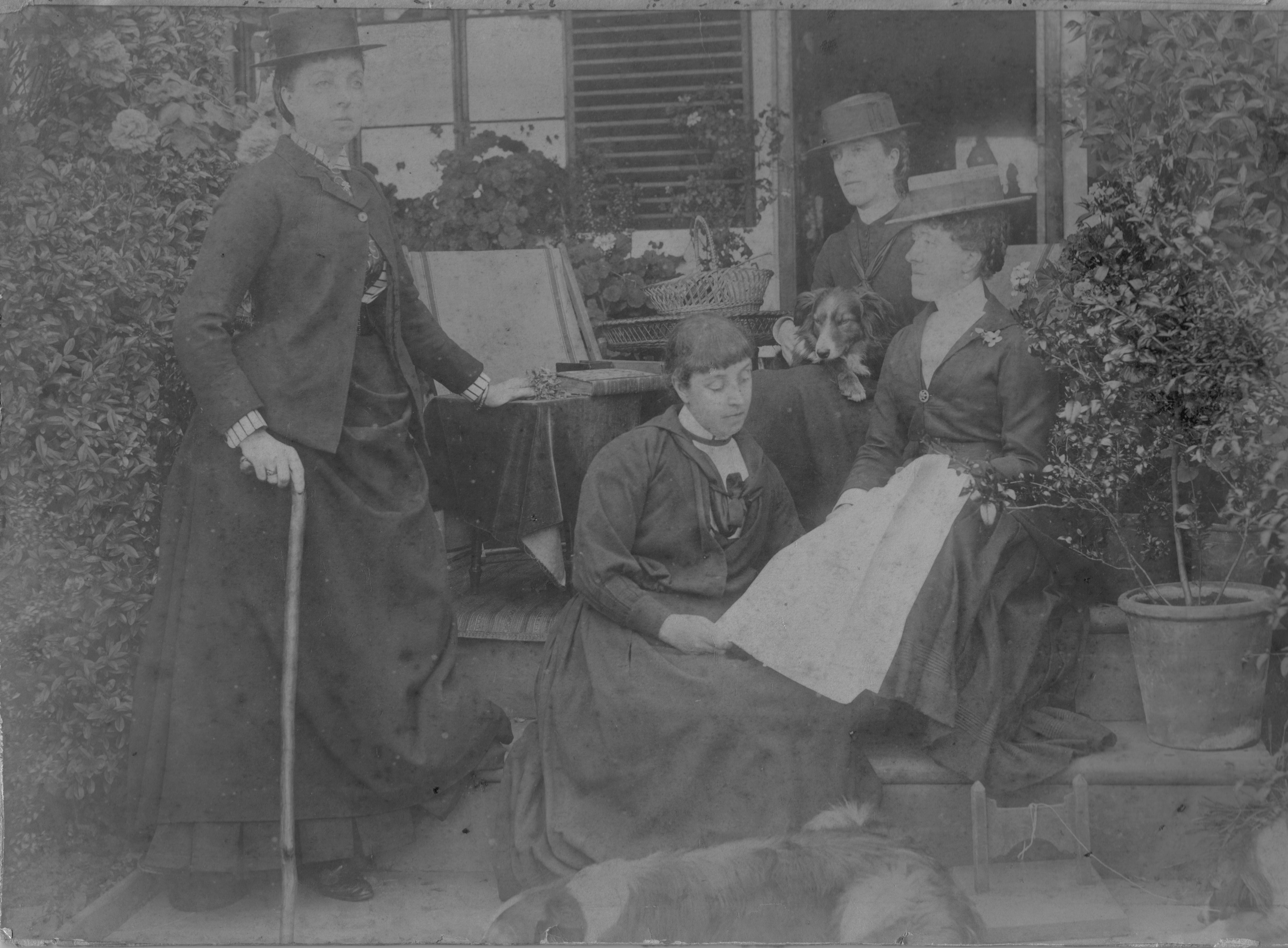
Madge, Nina and Blanche Peers-Williams

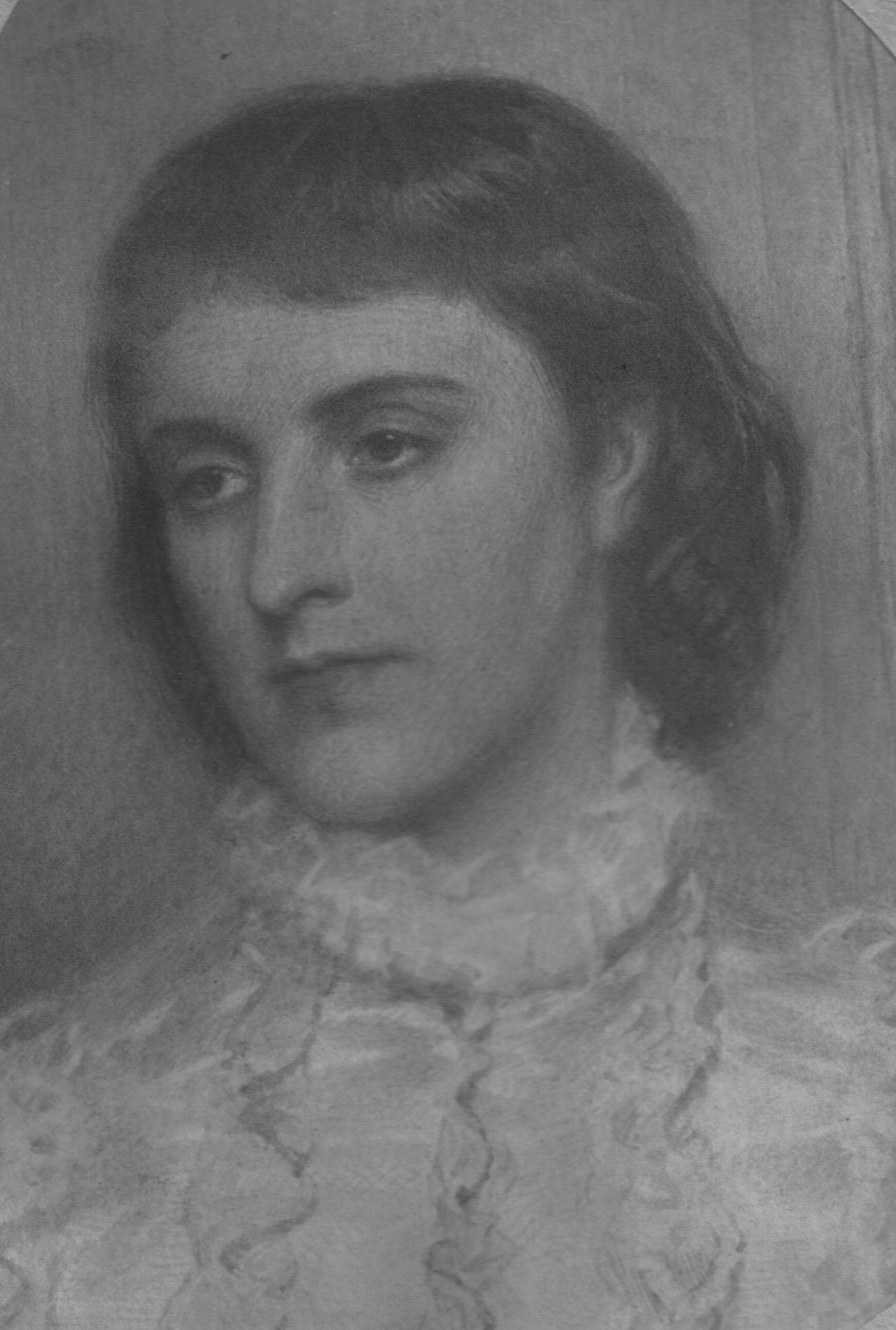
Edith Peers-Williams, later Countess of Aylesford

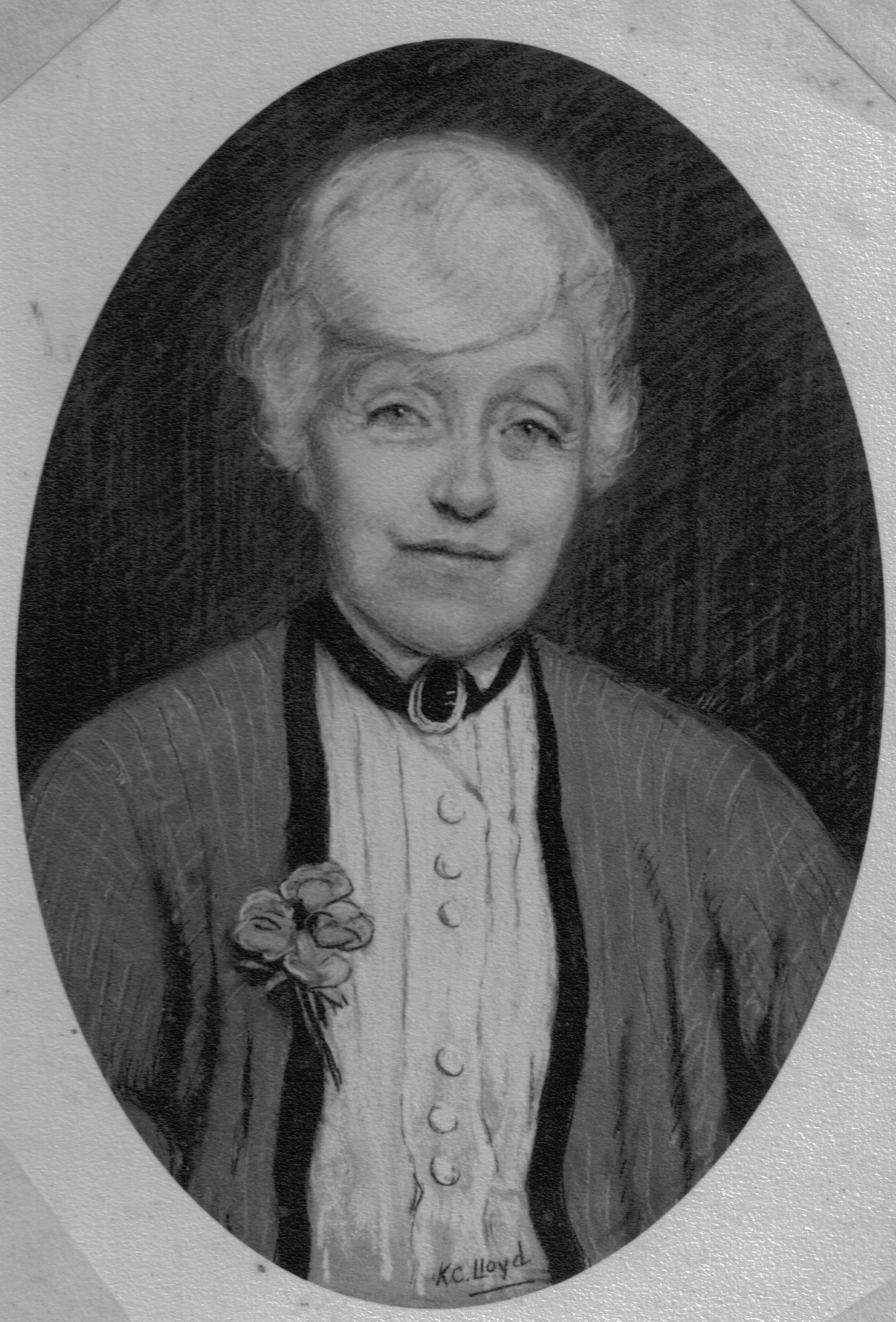
Evelyn, Duchess of Wellington.

On 27 August 1835 Williams married Emily Bacon (d. 1876), daughter of Anthony Bushby Bacon of Benham Park and later of Elcot Park, both in Berkshire. Their children included:

- Lt.-Gen. Owen Lewis Cope Williams (1836–1904), who married Fanny Florence Caulfeild, younger daughter of St. George Francis Caulfeild and younger sister of Emily, Countess of Lonsdale, in 1862. After her death in 1876, he married Nina Mary Adelaide Sinclair, daughter of Sir John Sinclair, 3rd Baronet, in 1882.
- Margaret Elizabeth Williams (1838–1909), who married, as his second wife, Sir Richard Williams-Bulkeley, 11th Baronet of Baron Hill, Anglesey in 1866; Sir Richard was a son of Sir Richard Williams-Bulkeley, 10th Baronet.
- Emily Gwendoline Williams (1839–1932), who married 2nd Earl Cowley, eldest son of the Henry Wellesley, 1st Earl Cowley, in 1863.
- Blanche Mary Williams (1844–1914), who married Lt.-Col. Lord Charles John Innes-Ker (1842–1919), second son of the James Innes-Ker, 6th Duke of Roxburghe, in 1866.
- Nina Janet Bronwen Williams (c. 1849–1939), who married Hon. Seton Montolieu Montgomerie, a younger son of the Archibald Montgomerie, 13th Earl of Eglinton, in 1870.
- Thomas Anthony Hwfa Williams (c. 1850–1926), who married Florence Farquharson, daughter of Henry Farquharson, in 1881; he was manager of Sandown Park racecourse and they lived at Ovington Square and were prominent in the court of Edward VII.
- Edith Peers-Williams (c. 1854–1897), who married Heneage Finch, 7th Earl of Aylesford (1849–1885), in 1871; they separated in 1877, when she became involved with the married Marquess of Blandford (later the 8th Duke of Marlborough). The Earl of Aylesford attempted to divorce his wife, but was himself found guilty of adultery, and thus the decree nisi was cancelled.
- Evelyn Katrine Gwenfra Williams (1855–1939), who married Henry Wellesley, 3rd Duke of Wellington in 1882. After his death in 1900, she married, in 1904, as his third wife, Col. Hon. Frederick Arthur Wellesley (1844–1931), a son of the 1st Earl Cowley and younger brother of the 2nd Earl Cowley, the husband of her elder sister, Emily.

Williams died on 8 September 1875. His wife died on 24 November 1876.

=== Descendants ===
Through his eldest son Owen, he was a grandfather of Owen Gwynedd St George Williams (1865–1893), who was killed in the Matabele War.

Through his son Hwfa, he was a grandfather of Gwenfra Williams, whose daughter Julie became Princess Korybut-Woroniecki by her marriage to Prince Krzysztof Korybut-Woroniecki. They had two children: Jan Korybut-Woroniecki, a London restaurateur, and Marysia Korybut-Woroniecka, a fashion business executive based in New York.

Through his daughter Gwendoline ("Gwen"), who lived at Bodwen on the Isle of Wight overlooking Wootton Creek, he was a grandfather of Lady Eva Wellesley (who married, as his second wife, Randolph Wemyss, Laird of Wemyss Castle and Chief of Clan Wemyss) and Henry Wellesley, 3rd Earl Cowley.

Through his daughter Margaret ("Madge"), he was a grandfather of Bridget Henrietta Frances (née Williams-Bulkeley), who married Benjamin Seymour Guinness (parents Thomas Loel Guinness, MP for Bath, Meraud Guinness, and Tanis Eva Bulkeley Guinness).

Through his daughter Edith, Countess of Aylesford, he was the grandfather of Lady Hilda Joanna Gwendoline Finch (1872–1931), Lady Alexandra Louise Minna Finch (1875–1959), and Guy Bertrand (b. 1881) who was baptized in June 1883 at St Mary le Strand as a son of the 7th Earl. His claims to the peerage (made by his mother Edith) were denied by the House of Lords in July 1885.

Through his daughter Bronwen, he was the grandfather of three: Alswen, Viva and May Montgomerie.

== Notes ==
Parliament of the United Kingdom
Preceded by Pascoe Grenfell; Owen Williams	Member of Parliament for Marlow; 1820–1868; With: Owen Williams 1820–1832; William Clayton 1832–1842; Renn Hampden 1842–1847; Brownlow William Knox 1847–1868	Succeeded by Thomas Owen Wethered
Honorary titles
Preceded by Henry Lowther	Father of the House; 1867–1868	Succeeded by Henry Lowry-Corry
