= Hwfa Williams =

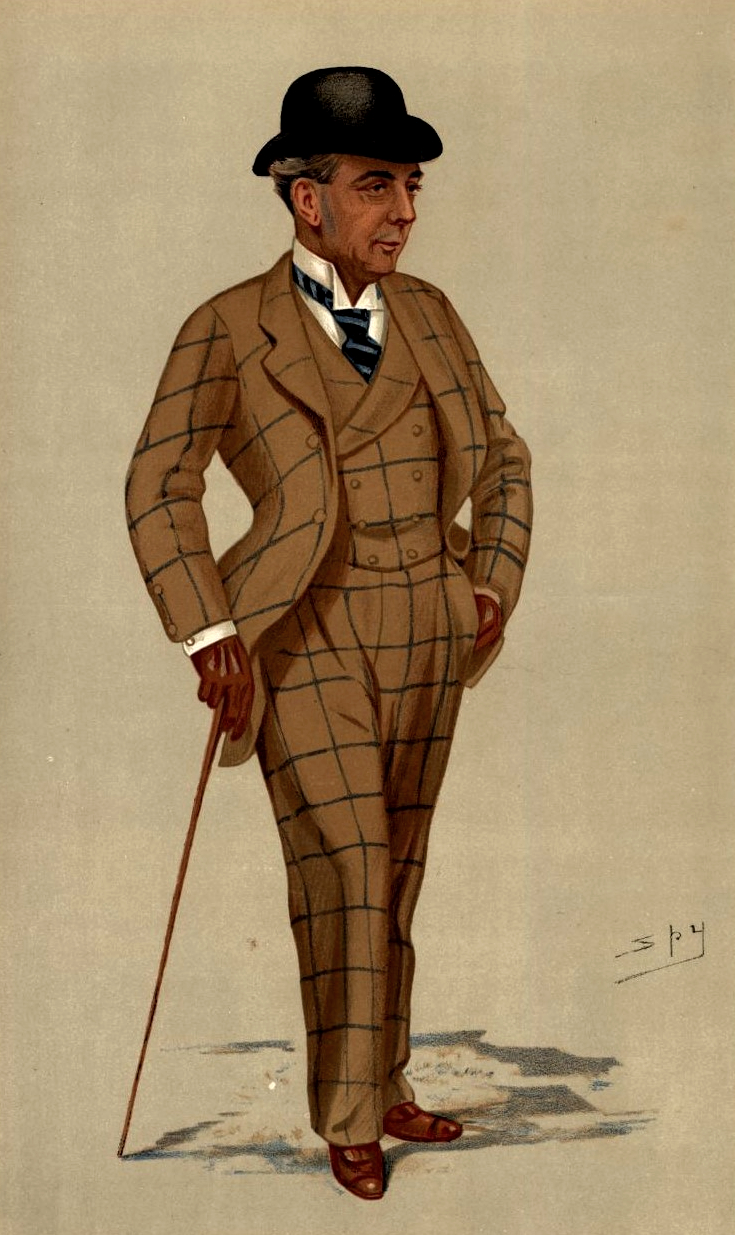
Hwfa Williams, 1891 cartoon

Thomas Anthony Hwfa Williams (1849/50–1926) was a British Army officer and racecourse manager. A figure of the Marlborough House Set, he was a close associate of the future King Edward VII, and his wife Mrs. Hwfa Williams (née Farquharson) a leader of the fashionable world.

== Early life ==
He was a son of Thomas Peers Williams, and great grandson of Thomas Williams of Llanidan, born into a well-connected Welsh family that had become rich from copper mining. He was an ensign and lieutenant of the Durham Light Infantry, transferring in 1872 to the 15th Foot. In 1874 he left the regular forces, becoming a lieutenant in the Royal Anglesey Militia.

== Sandown Park racecourse ==
The land on which Sandown Park racecourse was constructed came into the extended Williams family when Lord Charles Ker and an associate named Millward made an opportunistic purchase. Ker, a son of James Innes-Ker, 7th Duke of Roxburghe and officer of the Scots Fusilier Guards, had married in 1866 Hwfa's sister Blanche Mary. Ker and Millward set up a racecourse, initially using mortgage finance; later Hwfa and his elder brother Owen Williams moved in as backers. Ker felt a long-term grievance about losing control of Sandown Park: wrongly, according to the barrister William Allison.

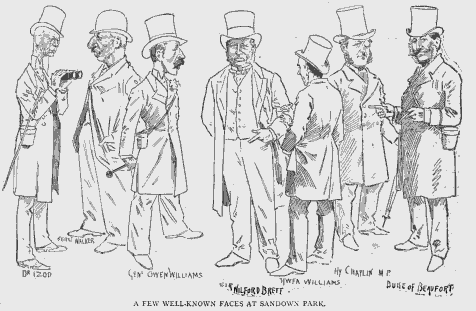
A Few Well-Known Faces at Sandown Park, 1886 cartoon, with the management trio of Owen Williams, Wilford Brett and Hwfa Williams at centre

Wilford Brett, brother of Sir William Brett, lived in neighbouring Esher, and came onto the management team with Owen and Hwfa Williams. At his suggestion vivandières selling race cards were introduced on the course.

Sandown Park was an "enclosed course" set up in 1875, followed by Kempton Park Racecourse in 1878, on a business model including racing clubs as membership organisations. An 1887 gazetteer described it as "a fashionable race-ground" covering 150 acres (61 ha). By 1895, with two decades behind it, Sandown Park had an established reputation as "the ladies' race-course".

Sir George Chetwynd, 4th Baronet wrote in his racing memoirs that

The truth of the matter is that Mr. Hwfa Williams has made Sandown popular; he has invented leviathan stakes, has looked after the comforts of the race-goers in every department, has always been liberal in the matter of walks over, and wherever the interests of owners were concerned.

== Other interests ==
Hwfa Williams was on the board of the Savoy Hotel Company set up in 1889 by Richard D'Oyly Carte. He was also a director of the company running the Niagara Hall ice rink in London from 1895.

== Family and social life ==
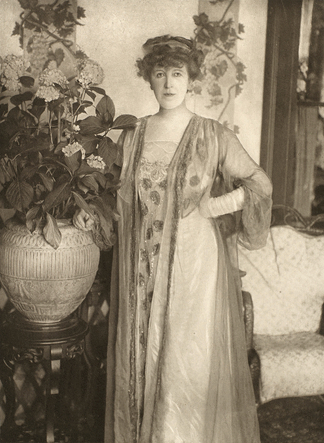
Mrs Hwfa Williams, 1909 photograph

On 22 March 1881, Williams married Florence, daughter of Major Henry Farquharson, of the Dorset Yeomanry Cavalry, a younger son of a gentry family of Langton House, near Blandford, Dorset. His father, James John Farquharson, of Langton House, JP, DL, was High Sheriff of Dorset in 1809. The family was established by Henry's grandfather, James Farquharson, a London East India merchant and ship-owner who had bought estates in Dorset. James's daughter, Elizabeth, married Capt. Sir William Fraser, 1st baronet, of Ledeclune, Inverness, himself "principal managing owner of several vessels in the service of the East India Company at the time of the Napoleonic Wars".

Hwfa and Florence Williams had a daughter, Gwenfra.

Referring to the 1880s, Daisy Greville, Countess of Warwick's memoirs commented that "Mr. and Mrs. Hwfa Williams, who founded Sandown Park racing, were welcome everywhere." On 29 May 1891 they gave a dance at the Savoy Hotel with the Vienna Band, Karl Wilhelm Drescher's salon orchestra. Guests included Franz Deym and Henry Wellesley, 3rd Duke of Wellington. That year Edward Walter Hamilton in his diary distinguished between the London "smart set" and The Souls, placing the Hwfa Williamses in the former group. J. Mordaunt Crook commented on Hamilton's smart set list, led off by the Dowager Duchess of Manchester, as thoroughly parvenu, and he noted the predominance of nouveau riche industrial and financial fortunes.

The San Francisco newspaper The Wave in 1899 published a column asserting that "The most prominent untitled people in London may be said to be Mr. and Mrs. Hwfa Williams, Mr. and Mrs. Willie Grenfell and Mr. Algy Bourke. ... Mrs. Hwfa Williams is noted for her taste in dress and the originality of her entertainments. It was she who introduced the dinner dance into London, and also instituted the custom of a smart little hotel supper after a theatre. She entertains more duchesses than any woman in London, and can afford to be very exclusive in her dealings with even the titled aristocracy."

In 1911 Mrs Hwfa Williams held a dance in the London season at their house on Ovington Square with Lady Diana Manners and Sir Herbert Beerbohm Tree, at which Anna Pavlova performed.

When Osbert Sitwell was 20, so in 1912–3, she taught him the tango. He commented in his memoir volume Laughter in the Next Room on "Mrs. Hwfa Williams and her Edwardian circle" as an example of social groups that develop their own cant. He quotes also from the diary of Charles à Court Repington an account of a Watlington Park house party of World War I, hosted by Alice Keppel, to which he was invited, guests being "the Hwfa Williamses, Lord Ilchester, Lady Lilian Wemyss, Baroness Daisy de Brienen" with others including Harold Nicolson and Vita Sackville-West. Edith Sitwell came to think of both Florence Williams and Alice Keppel as "ancient and malevolent women", though finding Mrs Keppel more sympathetic.

== Death ==
Hwfa Williams died at Coombe Springs, Coombe, Kingston upon Thames, on 30 March 1926, aged 76. Florence Williams died in 1945. She had published an autobiography, It Was Such Fun, in 1935.
