= Owen Williams (politician, born 1764) =

British politician

Owen Williams (19 July 1764 – 23 February 1832) was a British politician who was a member of parliament for Great Marlow from 25 May 1796 to his death 23 February 1832.

== Biography ==
He was the son of another MP, Thomas Williams of Llanidan (died 29 November 1802), sometimes known as the "Copper King", alongside whom he served from 1796 to 1802. His son Thomas Peers Williams was another MP for Great Marlow, and so was his grandson Lt-General Owen Lewis Cope Peers Williams (died 1904).

Williams was married to Margaret Hughes, possibly daughter of his father's partner Rev. Edward Hughes, of Llysdulas (or his brother Michael Hughes), and had issue, at least one son, Thomas. His English residence was Temple House at Bisham in Berkshire, very close to Marlow.

Parliament of Great Britain
Preceded by William Lee-Antonie; Thomas Williams	Member of Parliament for Marlow; 1796–1801; With: Thomas Williams	Succeeded by Parliament of the United Kingdom
Parliament of the United Kingdom
Preceded by Parliament of Great Britain	Member of Parliament for Great Marlow; 1801–1832; With: Thomas Williams to 1802; Pascoe Grenfell 1802–1826; Thomas Peers Williams from 1826	Succeeded by Thomas Peers Williams; Sir William Clayton
