= Marle Hall =

Building in Conwy, Wales

Coordinates: 53°17′32″N 3°48′14″W

Marle Hall (also Marl Hall) is a Grade II listed Georgian building in Conwy County Borough, North Wales, situated close to Llandudno Junction and Snowdonia National Park. Built by Sir Hugh Williams, 5th Baronet, Marle Hall later became a convalescent home, and in 1971 was bought by Warwickshire County Council, who used it as an educational outward-bound centre that schools in the county could hire. Warwickshire County Council sold the property in March 2022, citing the high maintenance cost, its under use, and the large amount of work required to modernise the building.

== History ==
The first Marle Hall was built by Sir Hugh Williams, 5th Baronet (1628–1686), of the Williams baronets of Penrhyn. It was a Jacobean mansion (c. 1661), then substantially expanded in the early 18th century in the Georgian style. It passed by marriage out of the Williams family to Terence Prendergast (died 1776).

A fire in the 18th century reduced the Hall to one wing, with the other parts left roofless. On the basis of a suggestion of 1875 by John Price (1803–1887) ("Old Price"), the Hall has been considered to have been a source for the poem "The Haunted House" by Thomas Hood.

The Marle estate was subsequently bought by Thomas Williams of Llanidan. Owen Williams, his great-grandson, sold it off in 1889, and Marle Hall went to Corbet Woodall.

By 1898, Marle Hall was used as a convalescent home, and it underwent restoration at the turn of the century. Since 1971, the property has been owned by Warwickshire County Council, which has operated it as an outdoor learning centre providing residential trips and courses for schoolchildren in Warwickshire. Activities on offer at the facility include canoeing, rock climbing and hiking, and it has become a popular venue for educational trips from Warwickshire, as well as other areas. The building received its listed status in 1950.

== Pandemic times ==
In March 2020, the COVID-19 pandemic forced the facility to temporarily close. In December 2020, Warwickshire County Council's Cabinet proposed that its Marle Hall Centre for Outdoor Learning be closed permanently in 2021. In January 2021, a 7,000-signature petition to keep the facility open was presented to Warwickshire County Council, with many signatories emphasizing the important role they felt outdoor learning could have for children. In August 2021, the council voted to sell the property, citing its high maintenance cost and under-use in recent years, as well as the large amount of work that would be required to renovate and modernise it, estimated to be around £850,000 over ten years. Warwickshire County Council scheduled the facility's closure date for 22 October 2021, with schools that had booked places at the venue after that being offered help to make alternative arrangements.

The property was put up for sale in February 2022 with a guide price of £400,000, and was sold at auction the following month for £890,000. It was bought by Marl Hall Holdings, a company that offered it to the Home Office as a potential site to house asylum seekers. The offer was declined in early 2023, and following objection from local residents, as well as Robin Millar and Janet Finch-Saunders, the area's representatives in the House of Commons and the Senedd respectively. Craig Lambie, director of Marl Hall Holdings, expressed his disappointment, feeling that it would have brought economic benefit to the area.

In 2022, and following its sale of Marle Hall, Warwickshire County Council subsequently advertised two three-day Break Away Camps in conjunction with the Outward Bound Trust for 200 people aged 16 to 24 who were "unemployed or economically inactive". The courses, to be held at the Outward Bound Trust centre at Aberdovey, attracted criticism from a group which had previously campaigned to keep Marle Hall open, and who described it as "a farce. You're now using an outdoor centre for young people in Wales after you sold your own". Warwickshire County Council said that funding for the project had been made available from central government through Community Renewal Funding, and again cited the maintenance cost as the reason for the venue's closure.
