= Sir William Clayton, 5th Baronet =

British politician

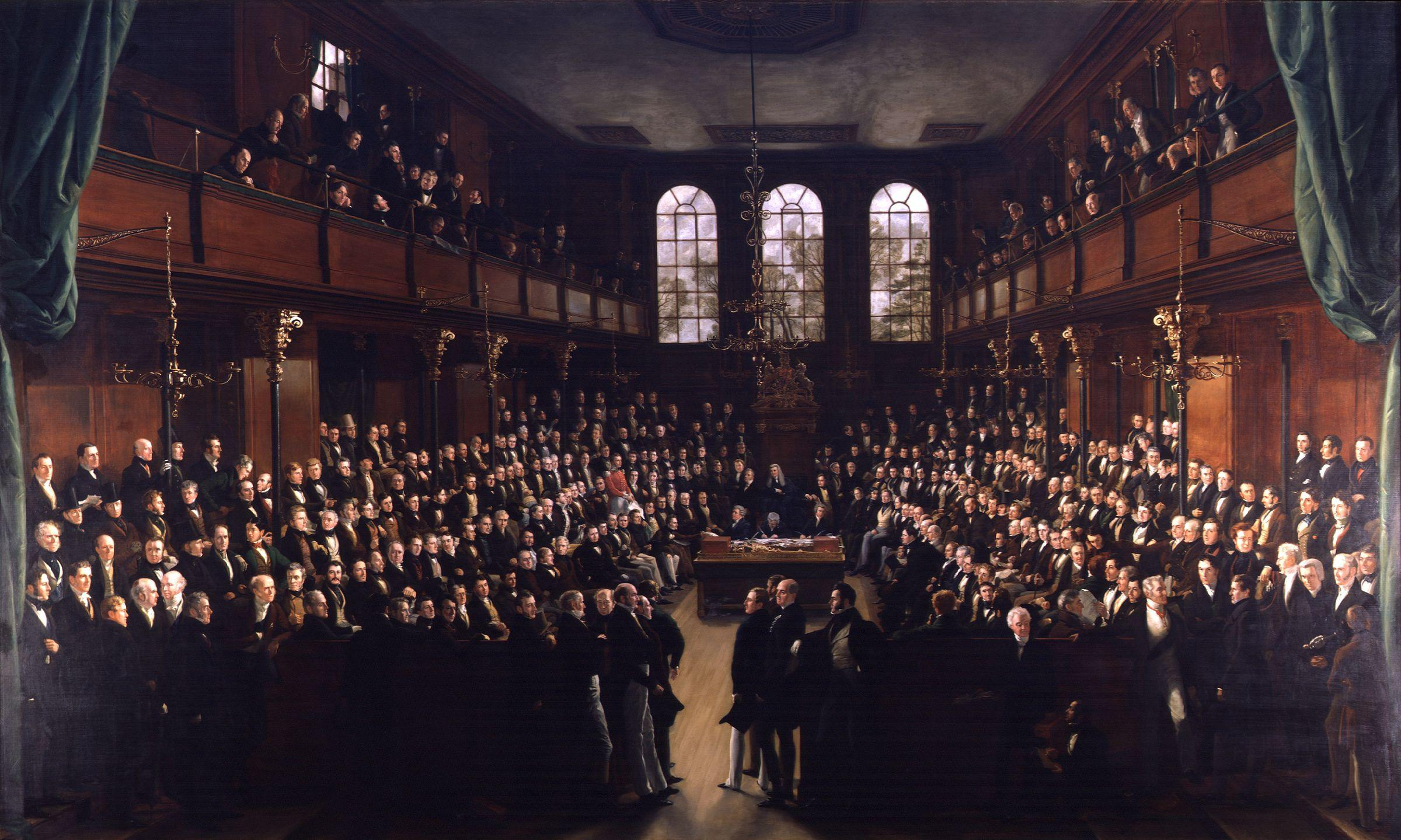
The House of Commons, 1833, by Sir George Hayter (died 1871), given to the National Portrait Gallery, London in 1858. Also known as "The Meeting of the First Reformed Parliament".

Sir William Robert Clayton, 5th Baronet (28 August 1786 – 19 September 1866) was an English Army officer and politician.

He was the eldest son of Sir William Clayton, 4th Baronet of Harleyford, near Great Marlow, Buckinghamshire and educated at Eton college. He succeeded his father in 1834.

He joined the Army as an ensign in the 10th Foot in 1804 and transferred as a lieutenant to the Royal Horse Guards in 1805, rising to captain in 1809. In 1812 he went with the Horse Guards to the Peninsular War and the following year took part in the battles of Vitoria, the Pyrenees and Pamplona. He was made major in 1815 and saw action at Quatre Bras and Waterloo in 1815. He went on half-pay in 1816 and was made lieutenant-colonel on half-pay in 1826. He was promoted colonel in 1841, major-general in 1851, lieutenant-general in 1858 and full general in 1865.

He was a Member of Parliament (MP) for Great Marlow from 1832 to 1842. He was pricked High Sheriff of Buckinghamshire for 1846–47.

He died at Southsea in 1866. He had married in May 1817 Alice Hugh Massey O’Donnell, the daughter and heiress of Lieutenant-colonel Hugh O’Donnell, MP of Tralee, County Kerry. (Son of Sir Neal O’Donnell 1st Bt. )The marriage ended in an acrimonious divorce in 1832. They had 2 sons and 2 daughters, including Caroline Douglas who became Marchioness of Queensberry. His sons both predeceased him and he was therefore succeeded in the baronetcy and settled estates by his grandson William Robert Clayton (1842–1914).

Parliament of the United Kingdom
Preceded by Thomas Peers Williams; Owen Williams	Member of Parliament for Great Marlow; 1832–1842; With: Thomas Peers Williams	Succeeded by Thomas Peers Williams; Renn Hampden
Baronetage of Great Britain
Preceded by William Clayton	Baronet (of Marden Park); 1834–1866	Succeeded by William Robert Clayton
