= Owen Williams (British Army officer) =

British Army officer and politician

Lieutenant-General Owen Williams JP
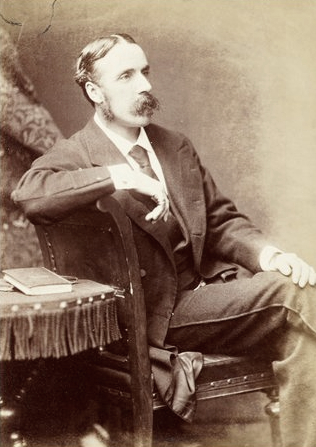
- Photograph of Williams, c.1876

Member of Parliament for Great Marlow
- In office 1880–1885
- Preceded by: Thomas Owen Wethered
- Succeeded by: Constituency abolished

Personal details
- Born: Owen Lewis Cope Williams; 13 July 1836
- Died: 2 October 1904 (aged 68)
- Party: Conservative
- Spouse(s): Fanny Florence Caulfeild (m. 1862; died 1876) Nina Mary Adelaide Sinclair
- Relations: Hwfa Williams (brother)
- Children: Owen Gwynedd St. George Williams
- Parent(s): Thomas Peers Williams; Emily Bacon
- Education: Eton College

Military service
- Branch/service: British Army
- Years of service: 1854–1887
- Rank: Lieutenant General
- Unit: Royal Horse Guards

Lieutenant-General Owen Lewis Cope Williams JP (13 July 1836 – 2 October 1904) was a British Army officer and Conservative politician who sat in the House of Commons from 1880 to 1885. He belonged to the Marlborough House set around the future King Edward VII.

== Early life ==
Williams was born into the landed gentry on 13 July 1836. He was the eldest son of Thomas Peers Williams, MP for Great Marlow, and the former Emily Bacon. Among his siblings was Hwfa Williams, who became a courtier in the circle of the Prince of Wales, and his sisters, three of whom married into the nobility, including Edith Finch, Countess of Aylesford.

His maternal grandfather was Anthony Bushby Bacon of Benham Park in Berkshire. Three generations of descent from Thomas Williams of Llanidan, who had made a fortune from the copper of Mynydd Parys.

He was educated at Eton College.

== Career ==
Williams joined the Royal Horse Guards in 1854. He became lieutenant in 1856, captain in 1858, major and lieutenant colonel in 1866. He was colonel and commanding officer of the Royal Horse Guards from 1871 to 1882. His successor was Frederick Burnaby, who had quarrelled with both Williams and the Prince of Wales as colonel-in-chief, and soon left the country. Williams became a major-general on half-pay in 1882 and retired as lieutenant general in 1887.

At the 1880 general election Williams was elected MP for Great Marlow. He held the seat until 1885, when it was abolished.

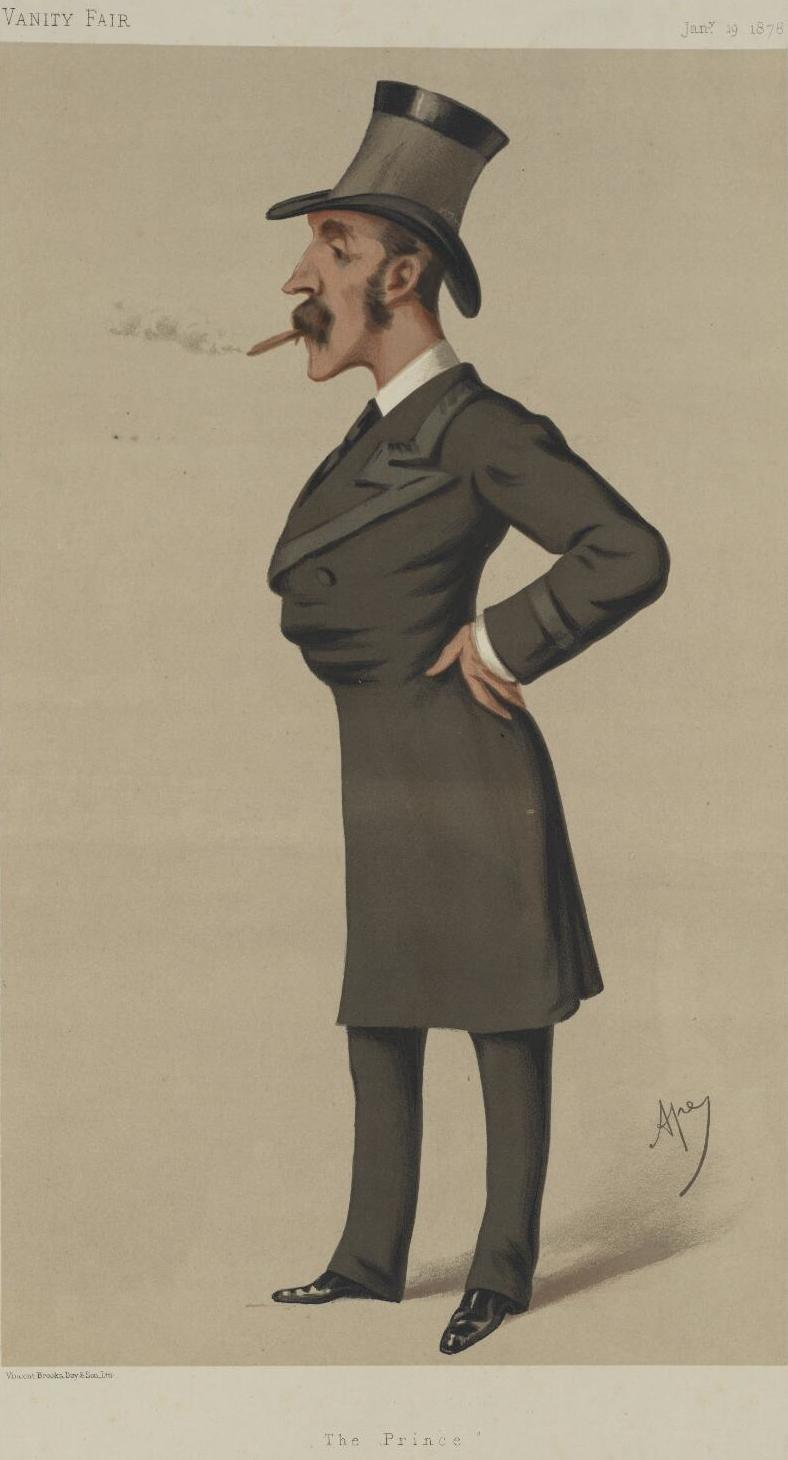
Owen Lewis Cope Williams: Vanity Fair 19 January 1878

=== Landowner ===
Upon his father's death in 1875, Williams became the owner of an extensive landed estate, in Wales and England.

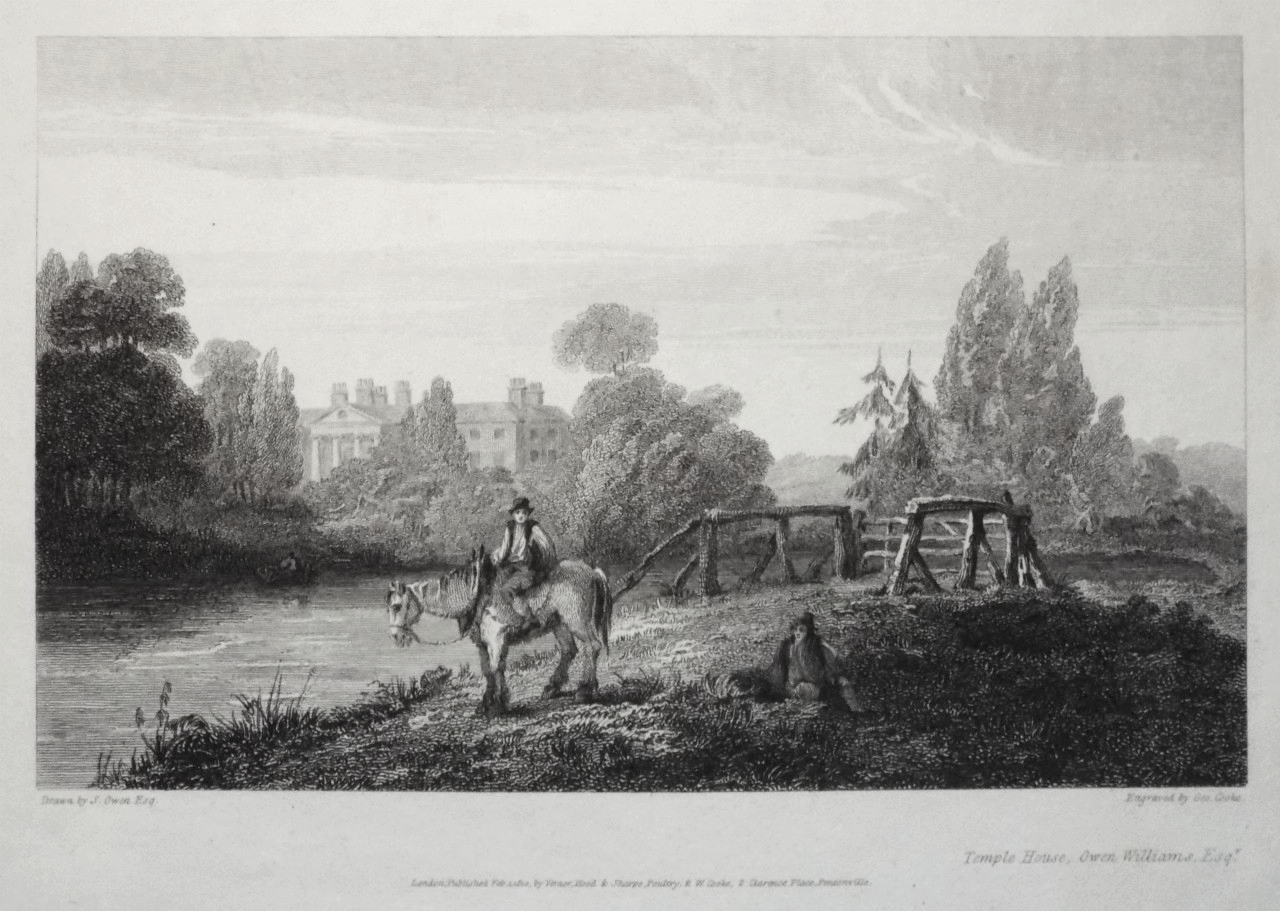
Temple House, Berkshire in the time of Owen Williams the elder, 1810 engraving

Williams was a J.P. for Buckinghamshire, Berkshire, Anglesey, Carnarvonshire and Flintshire. He lived at Temple House at Bisham in Berkshire, not far from Marlow, Buckinghamshire. It had been built in 1790 for Thomas Williams of Llanidan, the architect being Samuel Wyatt. It was adjacent to Temple Lock on the River Thames.

In 1889 Williams sold the family Anglesey estate of 2,400 acres (970 ha) at Craig-y-Don. That year he also sold the Marle estate, near Llandudno, Marle Hall going to Corbet Woodall.

== Personal life ==
Williams married, firstly, in 1862 Fanny Florence Caulfeild, daughter of St George Francis Caulfeild of Donamon Castle, Roscommon, who died in 1876. He married, secondly, Nina Mary Adelaide Sinclair, daughter of Sir John Sinclair, 3rd Baronet. She survived him and died in 1924, her heir being Hwfa Williams (died 1926), her husband's brother. Temple House was demolished c.1922, or c.1930.

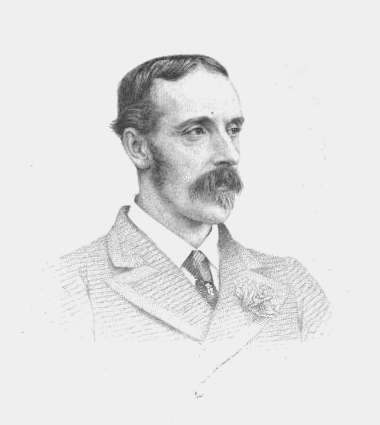
Owen Williams, 1884

His son Owen Gwynedd St. George Williams (1865–1893) went to Mashonaland with Lord Randolph Churchill around 1891. He was killed as a scout on the Shangani Patrol during the Matabele War, on 26 October 1893. A memorial to him was placed in Bisham Church.

=== The Fast Set ===
Williams accompanied the Prince of Wales on his visit to India in 1875–6. For the purposes of the royal suite for this journey, he had the title of equerry, with the courtiers Arthur Ellis and Dighton Probyn. He also had a role of aide-de-camp, with Lord Charles Beresford. He was sent on a side trip from Bombay to Hyderabad state, in November 1875, in response to an invitation from its Prime Minister Salar Jung I, with Charles Harbord, 5th Baron Suffield and Francis Knollys. William Howard Russell's entry for 3 February 1876, on a visit to an area 25 miles (40 km) from Agra known for wild boar, records that Williams had "got his hand in" at pig-sticking, as had Arthur Ellis and Augustus FitzGeorge.

At the beginning of 1876 a potentially damaging scandal blew up, involving Williams's sister Edith, married to Heneage Finch, 7th Earl of Aylesford: who was in India with the Prince's party. She wrote to her husband in February of that year from Packington Hall, announcing her intention to run off with George Spencer-Churchill, Marquess of Blandford. George's brother Lord Randolph Churchill at the same time wrote to involve the Prince, whom he asked to moderate the reactions of Aylesford and Williams. Aylesford, however, sent a telegram to his mother, asking her to collect the children of the marriage; she had no idea of the circumstances, and Alexandra of Denmark, who knew what Edith intended, sent her husband the Prince a cipher telegram again asking him to smooth things over. Matters became embroiled since the Prince took Aylesford's side, while Randolph tried to pressure him over the existence of certain letters. Williams wrote to Charles Yorke, 5th Earl of Hardwicke, who was acting for the Prince in dealing with Randolph, suggesting Aylesford should challenge Blandford to a duel (by then illegal). Aylesford, by then returned from India, met Hardwicke in the House of Lords, and explained that instead he was divorcing Edith.

In 1874 Sandown Park had come into Williams's possession, via his brother-in-law Lord Charles John Innes-Ker. The racecourse there was managed by Hwfa Williams, his brother. In 1885, the founding with the backing of Leopold de Rothschild of the Eclipse Stakes, offering prize money of £10,000, saw the Williams brothers and their partner Wilford Brett make the reputation of the Sandown Park racecourse. Sandown Park was one of a group of "gate-money" racecourses, within easy reach of London, that included also Hurst Park, Kempton Park and Lingfield Park, that towards the end of the 19th century broke the mould of louche venues with poor security. It was run at a good profit, and had subscribers.

Williams was also a racehorse owner, using the trainer John Dawson. He became a member of the Jockey Club in 1881. He won the Portland Plate in 1887 with Lisbon.

In 1877 Williams bought the yacht Enchantress from Joseph Florimond Loubat. He was well known at Cowes Week regatta, and celebrated for the occasion when in a gale he told his skipper "We will not shorten sail", resulting in considerable damage.

Williams was prominent in the Royal baccarat scandal of 1890–1, centred on allegations of cheating during two evening sessions at a private house party of the card game baccarat made against Sir William Gordon-Cumming. In the subsequent slander case, it came out that Williams had acted as a croupier during the sessions. His major role in the affair was, with Lord Coventry, to defend the reputation of the Prince of Wales by closing down the allegations, and to that end requiring Gordon-Cumming to pledge that he would not again play cards. As a cover-up, it failed.

Parliament of the United Kingdom
Preceded by Thomas Owen Wethered	Member of Parliament for Great Marlow; 1880 – 1885	Constituency abolished
