= 1st Earl of Shelburne =

The Earl of Shelburne is a title that has been created twice in British history. The first Earl may refer to:

- Henry Petty, 1st Earl of Shelburne (1675–1751), Anglo-Irish peer and politician
- John Petty, 1st Earl of Shelburne (1706–1761), Anglo-Irish peer and politician
