= Edmund Waller (1696–1771) =

British landowner and Whig politician

Edmund Waller (14 April 1696 – 25 April 1771), of Hall Barn, Beaconsfield, was an English landowner and Whig politician who sat in the House of Commons for 32 years from 1722 to 1754.

== Early life ==
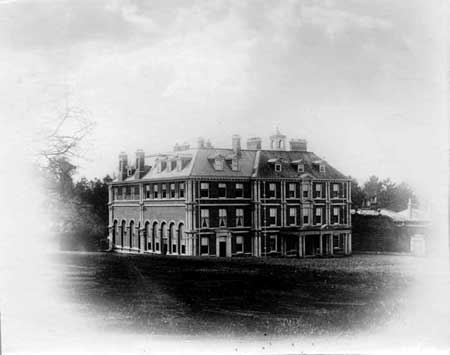
Hall Barn, around 1900

Waller was the eldest son of Stephen Waller and his wife Judith Vernon, daughter of Sir Thomas Vernon of Farnham, Surrey. In about 1700 he succeeded to the Gloucestershire estates of his uncle Edmund Waller and in 1707 to the estates of his father. He was educated at Eton College in 1707. He married, before 1724, Jane Aislabie, who was daughter of his mother's former husband, John Aislabie.

== Political career ==
Waller owned estates near both Marlow and Wycombe, which gave him political influence in both boroughs. At the 1722 general election, he was returned as a Whig Member of Parliament for Great Marlow on the family interest. He supported William Pulteney and in 1725 went into opposition with him. In 1726, he supported his younger brother, Harry, at a by-election at Wycombe, although his successful return was bought at a high cost. He was himself returned again as MP for Marlow in 1727, and was one of the anti-ministerial tellers on the petition after the election at Petersfield. He became a prolific speaker against Walpole's Administration. At the 1734 general election he was returned at Marlow and Wycombe, and chose to sit at Marlow.

At the 1741 general election Waller was returned as MP for Wycombe. When Walpole fell in 1742, Waller was offered a seat on the Treasury board but refused, He was elected to the secret committee of inquiry into Walpole's Administration and moved the opposition address against the Hanoverians on 10 December 1742. He served on a committee set up to co-ordinate opposition activity in the House of Commons during the next session. In 1744 he was one of the ‘junto’ of nine opposition leaders who achieved their aim of getting government places on the formation of the Broad Bottom ministry in December 1744. He was appointed Cofferer of the Household in December 1744. By December 1746, he had stopped attending the House because of deafness, and gave up his post in return for the appointment of his younger son, Edmund, to a life sinecure as Master of St. Katharine's Hospital.

Waller was returned to Parliament for Wycombe at the 1747 general election and was classed as Opposition and as one of the supporters of the Prince of Wales. In spite of this, he applied to the Duke of Newcastle for a company in the army for his eldest son. He gave up his seat at the 1754 general election.,.

== Death and legacy ==
Waller spent the rest of his life in retirement and died in April 1771. He had four sons and two daughters. Horace Walpole described him as a ‘dull obscure person, of great application to figures and the revenue’. His speeches were often unintelligible.

Parliament of Great Britain
Preceded by The Lord Shelburne; George Bruere	Member of Parliament for Great Marlow; 1722–1741; With: Sir John Guise 1722-1727; John Clavering 1727-1731; George Robinson1731-1732; Sir Thomas Hoby 1732-1741	Succeeded by Samuel Tufnell; Sir Thomas Hoby
Preceded by Harry Waller; Sir Charles Vernon	Member of Parliament for Wycombe; 1734; With: Harry Waller	Succeeded by Harry Waller; Sir Charles Vernon
Preceded by Harry Waller; Sir Charles Vernon	Member of Parliament for Wycombe; 1741–1754; With: Harry Waller 1741-1747; Edmund Waller, junior 1747-1754	Succeeded by The Earl of Shelburne; John Waller
