= Brownlow Knox =

British politician

Brownlow William Knox MP

Member of Parliament for Great Marlow
- In office 3 August 1847 – 18 November 1868 Serving with Thomas Peers Williams
- Preceded by: Renn Hampden; Thomas Peers Williams
- Succeeded by: Thomas Owen Wethered

Personal details
- Born: 1806
- Died: 14 March 1873 (aged 66–67)
- Party: Conservative
- Parent(s): Thomas Knox; Emma Williams

Brownlow William Knox (1806 – 14 March 1873) was a British Conservative Party politician.

He was elected MP for Great Marlow in 1847 and held the seat until 1868.

Parliament of the United Kingdom
Preceded by Thomas Peers Williams; Renn Hampden	Member of Parliament for Great Marlow; 1847–1868; With: Thomas Peers Williams	Succeeded by Thomas Owen Wethered
