= William Lee Antonie =

English politician

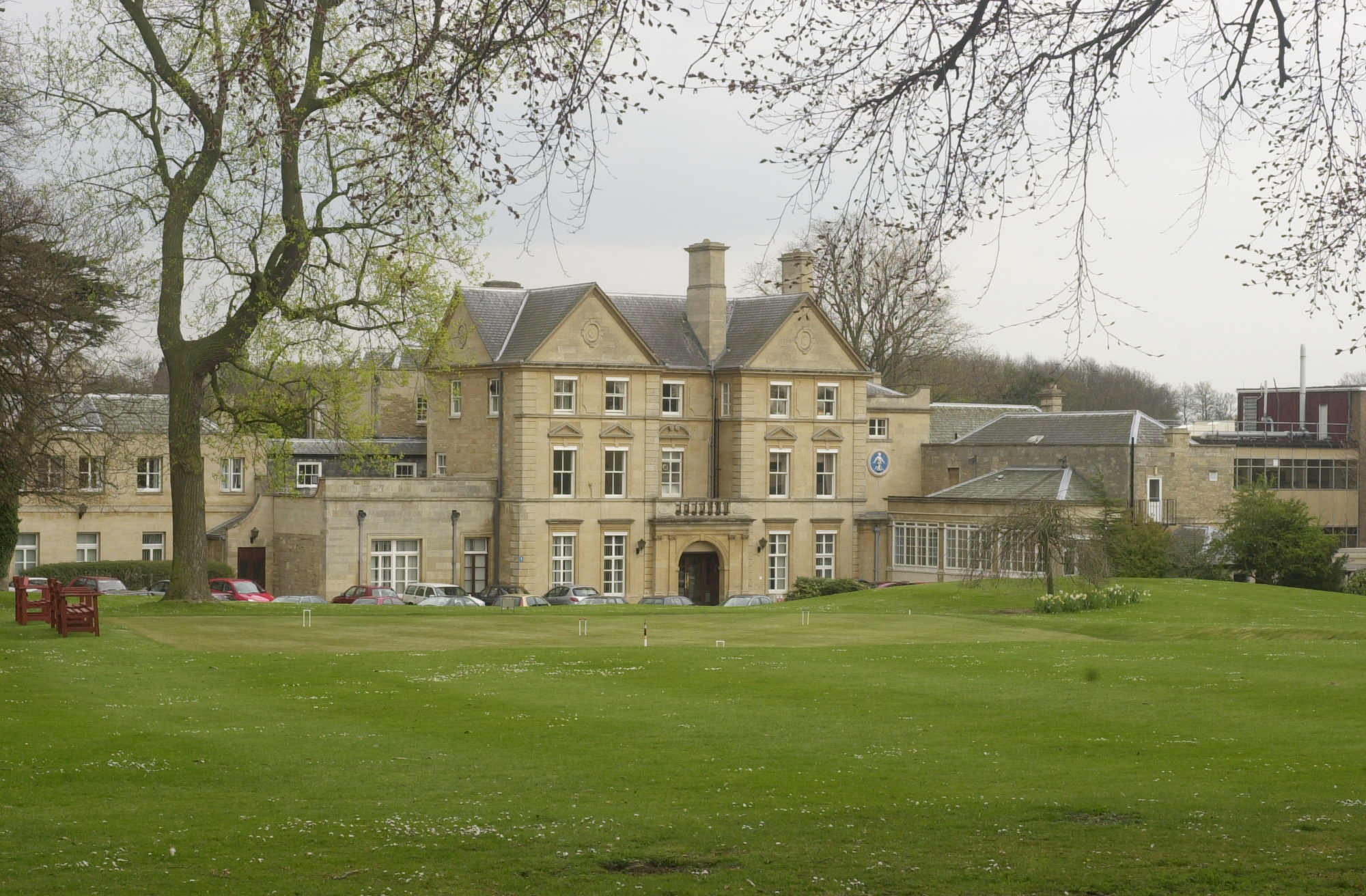
Colworth House

William Lee Antonie (24 February 1764 – 11 September 1815) was an English politician.

He was born William Lee, the son of William Lee, MP for Appleby. His grandfather was Sir William Lee, Chief Justice of the King's Bench. He was educated at Westminster School. In 1771 he inherited Colworth House, near Sharnbrook in Bedfordshire, from a cousin Richard Antonie, after which he added Antonie to his own name. He also inherited Totteridge Park, Buckinghamshire (formerly in Hertfordshire), from his father in 1778, his mother, Philadelphia, continuing to live there.

He was a Member of Parliament (MP) for Great Marlow from 1790 to 1796 and for Bedford from 1802 to 1812.

He died unmarried in 1815. He bequeathed Colworth House to his nephew John Fiott, who assumed the name of Lee under the terms of his uncle's will.

Parliament of Great Britain
Preceded by Sir Thomas Rich, Bt; William Clayton	Member of Parliament for Great Marlow; 1790–1796; With: Thomas Williams	Succeeded by Thomas Williams; Owen Williams
Parliament of the United Kingdom
Preceded by Samuel Whitbread; William MacDowall Colhoun	Member of Parliament for Bedford; 1802–1812; With: Samuel Whitbread	Succeeded by Samuel Whitbread; Lord George Russell
Honorary titles
Preceded by Joseph Partridge	High Sheriff of Bedfordshire; 1788–1789	Succeeded by Samuel Boydon
