= Charles Vernon (died 1762) =

British merchant and Tory politician

Sir Charles Vernon (c. 1683–1762), of Farnham, Surrey, was a British merchant and Tory politician who sat in the House of Commons between 1731 and 1761.

Vernon was the third son of Sir Thomas Vernon, MP who was a London merchant and director of the East India Company and his wife Anne. He became a merchant trading with Turkey. Before 1717, he married Anne Catherine Vernon, daughter of George Vernon of Farnham. He was knighted on 27 October 1717.

Vernon, was returned unopposed as Member of Parliament for Chipping Wycombe on the interest of his nephew, Edmund Waller at a by election on 27 January 1731. His brother, Thomas Vernon was a Tory and presumably Vernon was Tory too, voting consistently against the Administration. At the 1734 British general election Waller stood for Wycombe and Marlow, and chose Marlow leaving an opening for Vernon to come in again at Wycombe at a by election on 17 February 1735. In Parliament, Vernon withdrew on the motion for the dismissal of Walpole in February 1741. At the 1741 British general election, both seats at Wycombe were taken by the Wallers and Vernon did not stand. At the 1747 British general election, Vernon was returned at Ripon on the interest of his son-in-law, William Aislabie, and was classed as ‘Opposition’.

Vernon was returned for Ripon again at the 1754 British general election. He did not stand in 1761.

Vernon died on 4 April 1762, aged 78 leaving four sons and two daughters.

Parliament of Great Britain
| Preceded by Harry Waller; William Lee | Member of Parliament for Chipping Wycombe; 1731–1734; With: Harry Waller | Succeeded by Harry Waller; Edmund Waller |
| Preceded by Harry Waller; Edmund Waller | Member of Parliament for Chipping Wycombe; 1735–1741; With: Harry Waller | Succeeded by Harry Waller; Edmund Waller |
| Preceded by William Aislabie; Hon. Henry Vane | Member of Parliament for Ripon; 1747–1761; With: William Aislabie | Succeeded by William Aislabie; William Lawrence |
