= Sir Thomas Cotton, 2nd Baronet, of Connington =

English politician

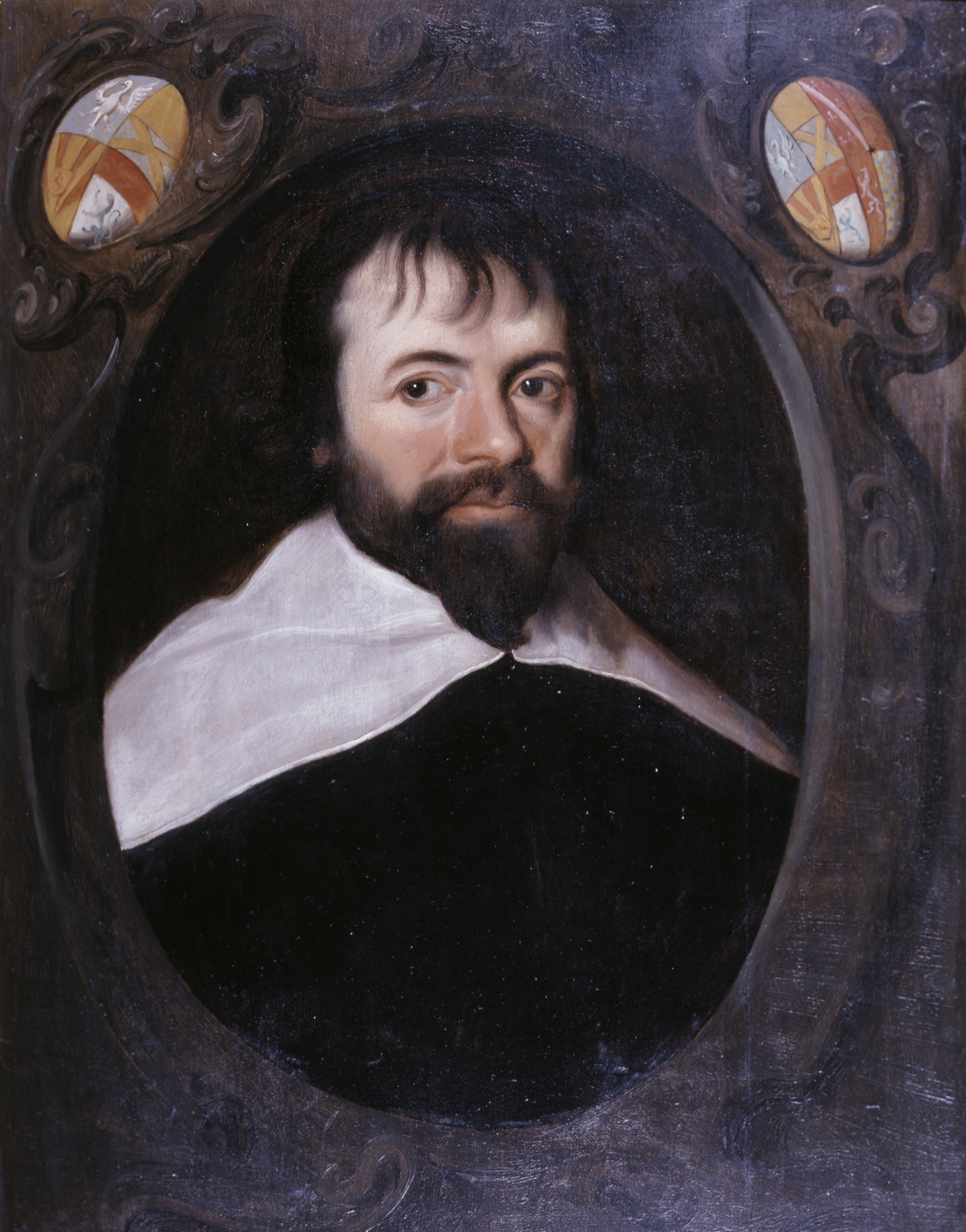
A painting of Thomas Cotton by Cornelis Janssens van Ceulen

Sir Thomas Cotton, 2nd Baronet, of Conington (1594 – 13 May 1662) was an English politician and heir to the Cottonian Library.

== Life ==
He was the only surviving child of Sir Robert Cotton, 1st Baronet, of Connington and Elizabeth Brocas. He graduated B.A. at Broadgates Hall, Oxford in 1616. In 1624 he became Member of Parliament for Great Marlow.

Sir Thomas was the intimate friend and correspondent of Sir John Eliot, and was entrusted by his influence with the representation of St Germans (Eliot's native place) in the third of Charles I's parliaments. He was M.P. for Huntingdonshire in the Short Parliament of 1640, but took no active part in politics or the civil wars. His house at Westminster was left at the disposal of the parliament, and Charles I slept there during his trial. Cotton died at Conington on 13 May 1662, and was buried with his father.

== Cottonian Library ==
He made great efforts for the restitution of his father's library, which later became the nucleus of the British Library. On 23 July 1631, the council ordered the catalogue to be continued; but in September Sir Thomas announced that it had been again interrupted, and begged to be allowed to retain possession of the books. This request was ultimately granted, although the date is uncertain.

Like his father, Sir Thomas gave scholars free access to his library. William Dugdale from an early age was often there, and obtained there much of his material for his Monasticon. In 1640 Sir Thomas lent his father's collection of coins to Sir Symonds D'Ewes. He moved the greater part of the library in 1650 to a villa at Stratton, Bedfordshire, which belonged to his son's wife.

== Family ==
He married Margaret Howard, daughter of Lord William Howard, of Naworth Castle, Cumberland, by whom he had one son, John, b. 9 March 1620/1, a daughter Lucy b. 17 April 1618, and a daughter Frances b. 19 July 1619. His wife Margaret died 5 March 1621/2. In 1640 Sir Thomas Cotton married Alice Constable, daughter and heiress of Sir John Constable of Dromanby, Yorkshire, widow of Edmund Anderson of Stratton and Eyworth, Bedfordshire, by whom he had four sons. Their second son, Robert, was Member of Parliament for Cambridgeshire, was knighted, was commissioner of the post office, and was friendly with John Evelyn.

== Notes ==
Attribution

This article incorporates text from a publication now in the public domain: Stephen, Leslie, ed. (1887). "Cotton, Robert Bruce". Dictionary of National Biography. Vol. 12. London: Smith, Elder & Co.

Parliament of England
Constituency re-enfranchised	Member of Parliament for Great Marlow; 1624–1625; With: Henry Borlase 1624; John Backhouse 1625	Succeeded by John Backhouse; Sir William Hicks, Bt
Preceded by Sir John Eliot; Sir Henry Marten	Member of Parliament for St Germans; 1628–1629; With: Benjamin Valentine	Parliament suspended until 1640
Parliament suspended since 1629	Member of Parliament for Huntingdonshire; 1640; With: Sir Capell Bedell	Succeeded by Sir Sidney Montagu; Valentine Walton
Baronetage of England
Preceded by Robert Cotton	Baronet (of Conington); 1631–1662	Succeeded by John Cotton
