= Henry Petty, 1st Earl of Shelburne =

Anglo-Irish peer and politician

Henry Petty, 1st Earl of Shelburne PC (I) (22 October 1675 – 17 April 1751) was an Anglo-Irish peer and politician who sat in the House of Commons from 1715 to 1727.

== Background ==
Petty was a younger son of Sir William Petty and Elizabeth, Baroness Shelburne, daughter of Sir Hardress Waller. He succeeded his elder brother Charles Petty, 1st Baron Shelburne to the family estates in 1696 and then bought further estates near Wycombe, Buckinghamshire.

== Political career ==
Petty was elected to the Irish House of Commons for Midleton in 1692, a seat he held until 1693, and then represented County Waterford between 1695 and 1699. In the latter year, the barony of Shelburne which had become extinct on the early death of his elder brother in 1696 was revived in his favour. Two years later he was sworn to the Irish Privy Council. He was later a member of the British House of Commons for Great Marlow between 1715 and 1722 and for Wycombe between 1722 and 1727. In 1719 he was further honoured when he was made Viscount Dunkerron and Earl of Shelburne in the Peerage of Ireland.

== Personal life ==
Lord Shelburne married the Hon. Arabella, daughter of Charles Boyle, 3rd Viscount Dungarvan, in 1699. They had one daughter Anne who married Francis Bernard of Castle Bernard, Bandon, County Cork. The Countess of Shelburne died in October 1740. Lord Shelburne survived her by eleven years and died in April 1751, aged 75, when his titles became extinct. His estates devolved on his nephew John FitzMaurice, who changed his surname to Petty and in whose favour the earldom of Shelburne was revived in 1753 (see Marquess of Lansdowne).

Parliament of Ireland
Unknown	Member of Parliament for Midleton; 1692–1693; With: Thomas Brodrick	Succeeded by Francis Brewster; St John Brodrick
Preceded by Edward FitzGerald-Villiers; Joseph Ivey	Member of Parliament for County Waterford; 1695–1699; With: John Mason	Succeeded by Sir John Mason; William Steuart
Parliament of Great Britain
Preceded by Sir James Etheridge; George Bruere	Member of Parliament for Great Marlow; 1715–1722; With: George Bruere	Succeeded by Edmund Waller; Sir John Guise, Bt
Preceded by Sir Thomas Lee, Bt; John Neale	Member of Parliament for Wycombe; 1722–1727; With: Charles Egerton 1722–1725; Hon. Charles Colyear 1726; Harry Waller 1726–1727	Succeeded by Harry Waller; William Lee
Peerage of Ireland
New creation	Earl of Shelburne; 1719–1751	Extinct
New creation	Baron Shelburne; 1699–1751	Extinct
