= Pascoe Grenfell =

British businessman and politician

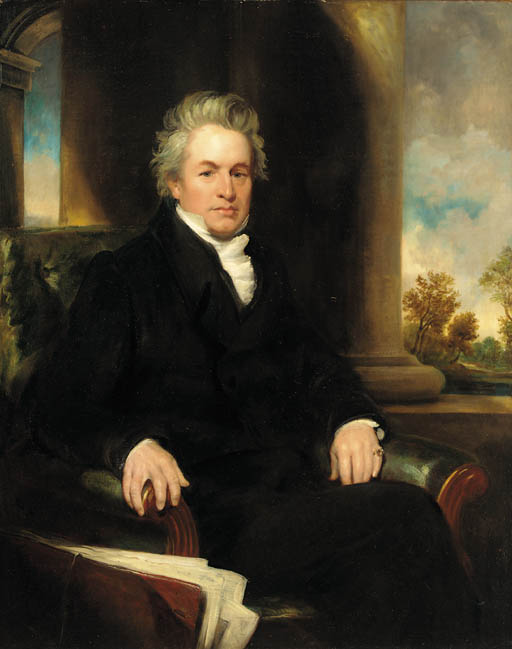
Grenfell by Sir Martin Archer Shee

Pascoe Grenfell (3 September 1761 – 23 January 1838) was a British businessman and politician.

== Biography ==
He was born at Marazion, in Cornwall. His father, Pascoe Grenfell (1729–1810), and uncle were merchants in the tin and copper business. Grenfell studied at Truro Grammar School before joining his father's business in London. Later, he joined the business of Thomas Williams of Llanidan, a major brass and copper producer, becoming Williams's principal manager. He also served as governor of the Royal Exchange Assurance Company from 1829 to 1838.

On Williams's death, Grenfell was chosen as one of the members of parliament for the constituency of Great Marlow in Buckinghamshire. He continued to represent that constituency until 1820, when he became representative for Penryn, a position he maintained to 1826. As a parliamentarian, he was a strong supporter of William Wilberforce in the debates on the human slave trade and transportation. He was also a vigilant observer of the Bank of England, and an authority on finance.

Grenfell died at 38 Belgrave Square in London on 23 January 1838.

== Family ==
On 26 August 1786, Grenfell married his cousin, Charlotte Granville (1765–1790), the daughter of his paternal uncle George Granville (1734–1784) and his first wife Elizabeth Bryer (1740–?). Charlotte died shortly after the birth of Charles Pascoe.

- Charlotte Granville Grenfell, married Major-General William James Stuart.
- Charles Pascoe, married Lady Georgiana Molyneaux, daughter of William Molyneux the 2nd Earl of Sefton.

On 15 January 1798, he married Georgiana St Leger (1775–1818) youngest daughter of St Leger St Leger, 1st Viscount Doneraile and Mary née Barry. He and Georgiana had a large family:

1. Pascoe St Leger Grenfell (1798–1879)
2. Marianne (1802–1892) who married wealthy banker and railroad baron George Glyn, later 1st Baron Wolverton
3. Emily Charlotte (1805–1875) who married Anglican minister, scientist, public health reformer, humanitarian and London Times correspondent Sydney Godolphin Osborne who published under the initialism "S.G.O." His eye-witness account of the Irish Famine, published as "Gleanings in the West of Ireland" in 1850, provides a scathing and horrific account of the failings of the British Government to appropriately aid Western Irish Famine victims.
4. Caroline Temple (1809–1886) who was the third wife of John Ashley Warre MP
5. Charlotte Maria French (1812–1860) who married the historian James Anthony Froude
6. Frances Eliza (1814–1891) a biographer who married Charles Kingsley, the poet, Christian socialist, Anglican minister, and novelist. Their daughter Mary St Leger Kingsley (1852–1931) became the popular late-Victorian novelist "Lucas Malet", and Charles Kingsley's niece Mary Kingsley (1862–1900) was a noted late–Victorian explorer and traveller.

Pascoe Grenfell lived at Taplow House, Taplow in Buckinghamshire.

Parliament of the United Kingdom
Preceded by Thomas Williams; Owen Williams	Member of Parliament for Great Marlow; 1802–1820; With: Owen Williams	Succeeded by Owen Williams; Thomas Peers Williams
Preceded by Henry Swann; Sir Christopher Hawkins, Bt	Member of Parliament for Penryn; 1820–1826; With: Henry Swann 1820–1824; Robert Stanton 1824–1826	Succeeded by David Barclay; William Manning
