= John Clavering (died 1762) =

John Clavering (19 July 1698 – 23 May 1762) of Chopwell Hall, Chopwell, formerly County Durham, now Tyne and Wear, was a member of a junior branch of the Clavering family.

He was the son of John Clavering of Chopwell and was a Groom of the Bedchamber at the Court of George II from 1731 to 1761.

He was Member of Parliament for Great Marlow 1727–1731 and Penryn 1734–1741.

His London address was 8 Burlington Street, where the new house was built for him on a 62-year leasehold in 1734.

He inherited the Chopwell estate from his father and an estate at Potter Newton, near Leeds, from his mother. He died unmarried and bequeathed his property to his nephew, the 2nd Earl Cowper.

Parliament of Great Britain
Preceded by Edmund Waller; Sir John Guise, Bt	Member of Parliament for Great Marlow; 1727–1731; With: Edmund Waller	Succeeded by Edmund Waller; George Robinson
Preceded by Edward Vernon; Sir Cecil Bishopp, Bt	Member of Parliament for Penryn; 1734–1741; With: Sir Richard Mill, Bt	Succeeded by John Evelyn; Edward Vernon
