= John Backhouse =

English landowner and politician

Sir John Backhouse
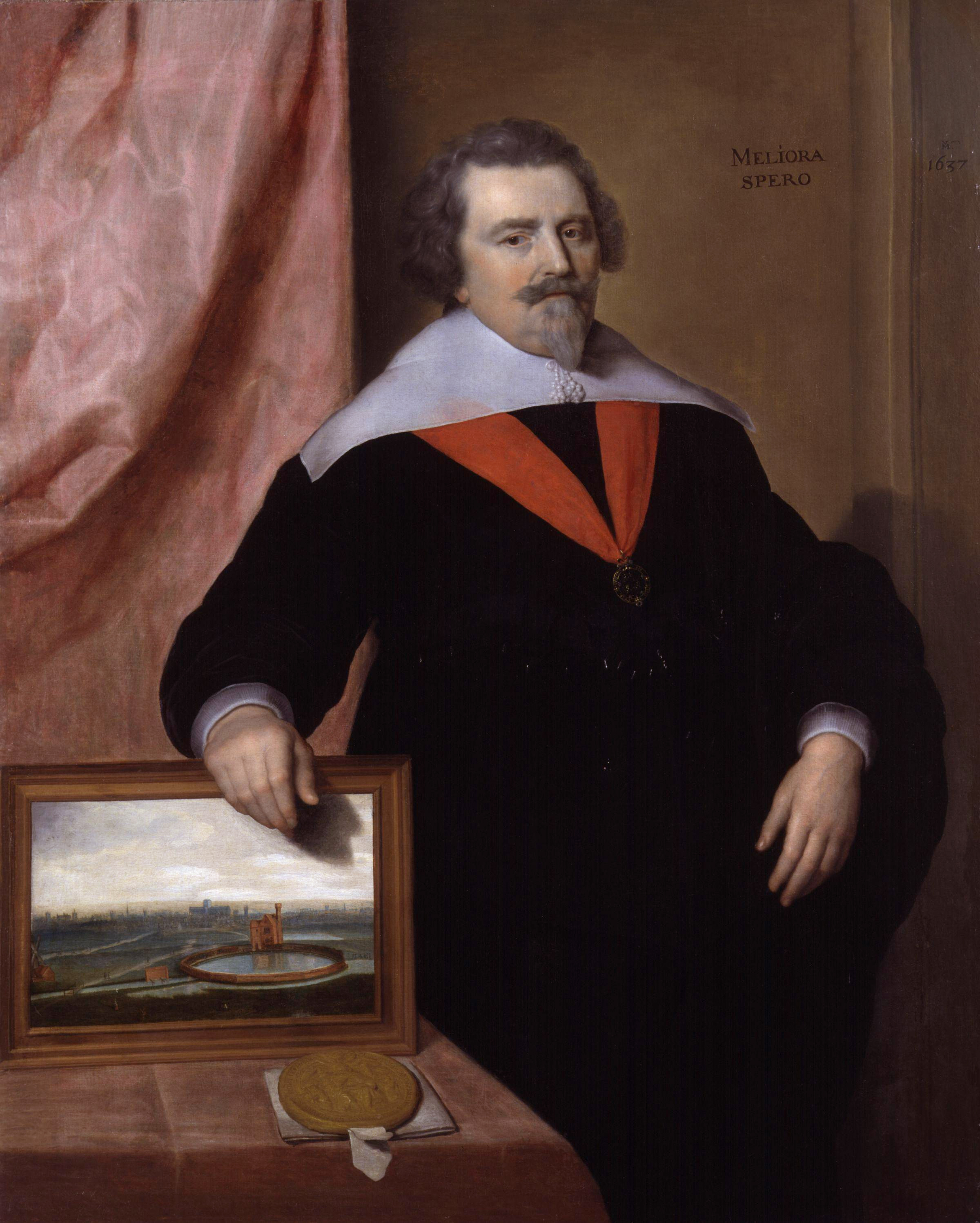
- Born: 1584
- Died: 1649 (aged 64–65)
- Occupation: Writer
- Known for: New River Company

Sir John Backhouse, KB (1584 – 9 October 1649) was an English landowner and politician who sat in the House of Commons from 1625 to 1629. He supported the Royalist cause in the English Civil War.

Backhouse was the son of Samuel Backhouse of Swallowfield Park in Berkshire and his wife, Elizabeth, daughter of Sir John Borlase of Little Marlow in Buckinghamshire. In the early 17th century, he helped found the New River Company to bring a new water supply to the City of London. In 1625, he was elected Member of Parliament for Great Marlow and was re-elected MP for Great Marlow in 1626. He was appointed Knight of the Order of the Bath at the coronation of King Charles I in 1626, the year in which he inherited Swallowfield Park. In 1628 he was re-elected MP for Great Marlow and sat until 1629 when King Charles decided to rule without parliament for eleven years.

Backhouse supported the King in the Civil War and as a result he was imprisoned and his estates were sequestrated. He died on 9 October 1649 and a monument was erected to his memory by his widow in Swallowfield Church.

Backhouse married Flower (Flora), daughter of Thomas Henshawe and sister of Benjamin Henshawe of the City of London on 11 July 1615. They had no children.

Parliament of England
| Preceded by Henry Borlase; Thomas Cotton | Member of Parliament for Great Marlow; 1625–1629; With: Thomas Cotton 1625; Sir William Hicks, 1st Baronet; Miles Hobart | Parliament suspended until 1640 |
