= Thomas Owen Wethered =

British politician

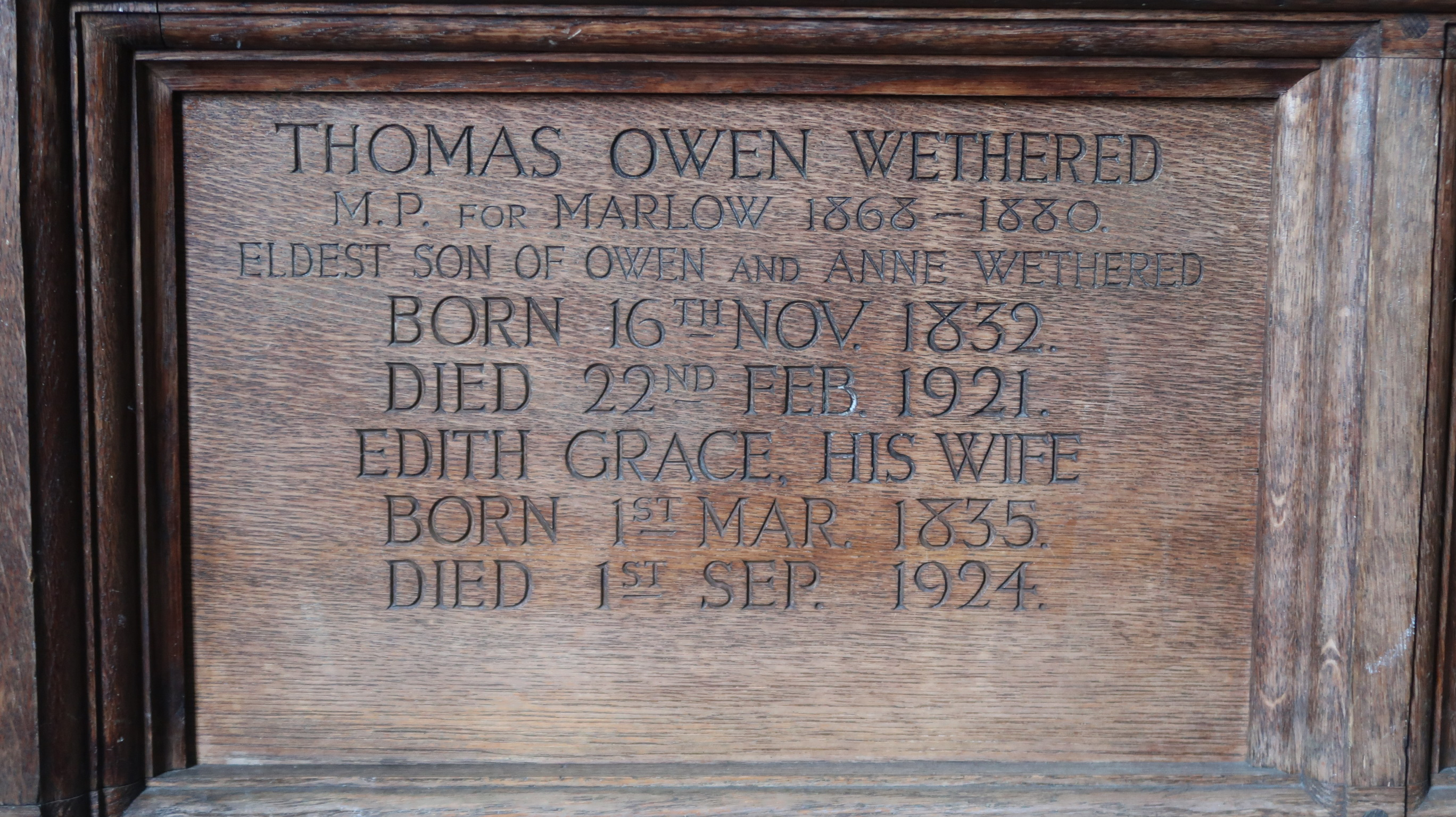
Thomas Owen Wethered - Memorial in All Saints Church, Marlow, England in Family Chapel

Thomas Owen Wethered (26 November 1832 – 22 February 1921) was an English Conservative Party politician and brewer who sat in the House of Commons from 1868 to 1880.

== Family background and early life ==
Wethered was the eldest son of Owen Wethered of Great Marlow and his wife Anne Peel, a daughter of the Rev. Giles Haworth Peel, of the Grotto, Basildon, Berkshire. His grandfather, who died in 1854, had been vicar of Ince in Cheshire and was the son of Jonathan Peel, of Accrington, a younger brother of Sir Robert Peel, 1st Baronet, so was a first cousin of the British Prime Minister Sir Robert Peel. His father was said to be "descended from the well-known family of that name, so long in residence at Ashlyns, Great Berkhamsted," and first recorded there in 1431. They had been brewers and maltsters at Marlow since the middle of the 18th century. The young Wethered was educated at Eton College and Christ Church, Oxford, where he was a contemporary of Lewis Carroll. In the author's diaries a note reading "Harvey sang too, and Wethered" refers either to him or to his younger brother Owen Peel Wethered (1837-1908).

In 1849, his grandfather Thomas Wethered died at the age of 88, leaving a fortune of £100,000 and a brewery producing 24,500 barrels of beer a year which owned a hundred public houses in Buckinghamshire. One Marlow pub called The Two Brewers had a portrait on one side of its sign of an 18th-century Thomas Wethered, founder of the firm, with the member of parliament and brewer Samuel Whitbread on the other side.

== Life ==
Wethered became a captain in the 1st Bucks Rifle Volunteers, a unit of the Volunteer Force, resigning his commission in 1865 in favour of his younger brother Owen Peel Wethered.

In 1862, Wethered's father died, leaving his business to his sons. Wethered was already living at Seymour Court, Great Marlow. He later enlarged the house, which was on a low hill one mile north of the town.

At the 1868 general election Wethered was elected Member of Parliament (MP) for Great Marlow. He held the seat until 1880, but did not stand in that year's election and was succeeded by another Conservative, Major-General O. L. C. Williams.

With his two brothers, Wethered owned the family brewery in Marlow, known as Thomas Wethered and Sons, and he was often described as a brewer. Most of his contributions in parliament were to do with the licensed trade.

== Wife and children ==
On 9 September 1856, Wethered married Edith Grace, a daughter of the Rev. Hart Ethelston, Rector of St Mark's, Cheetham Hill, Manchester. Their eldest daughter, Edith Ethelston, married John Danvers Power, MVO, a barrister; their second daughter, Constance Anne Ellen, married William George Steuart-Menzies of Culdares, DL JP, of Arndilly House, Craigellachie, Banffshire. Another daughter, Laura Sophia, married Francis William Grubbe. Wethered died on 22 February 1921 at the age of 88, his widow on 1 September 1924.

== Publications ==
- Thomas O. Wethered, Teetotalism and the beer trade: a reprint of letters, correspondence, etc., relating thereto (W. H. Allen, 1885)
- Thomas O. Wethered, Memorial to the Prime Minister (Plumbly Bros., 1885)
- Thomas O. Wethered, The Church of England Temperance Society and moderate drinkers (W. H. Allen & Co., 1889)

Parliament of the United Kingdom
Preceded by Thomas Peers Williams; Brownlow William Knox	Member of Parliament for Great Marlow; 1868 – 1880	Succeeded by Owen Williams
