= Harry Waller (MP) =

British lawyer & politician (c. 1701–1772)

Harry Waller (c. 1701–1772) was a British lawyer and Whig politician who sat in the House of Commons from 1726 to 1747.

== Early life ==
Waller was the second son of Dr. Stephen Waller and his wife Judith Vernon, daughter of Sir Thomas Vernon MP of Farnham, Surrey. He was the younger brother of Edmund Waller. He was admitted at Inner Temple in 1716 and was called to the bar in 1725. He also entered Lincoln's Inn in 1721.

== Career ==
At the 1722, Waller stood for Parliament at Wycombe, where his family had a major interest and also at St Ives but was unsuccessful at both. He stood for Wycombe at a by-election on 1 February 1726, which was declared void after irregularities. After a second by-election on 3 March 1726, he was returned on petition as Member of Parliament for Wycombe on 17 March. The mayor responsible for the management of the elections was committed to Newgate as a result. Waller was returned unopposed at the 1727, 1734 and 1741 general elections, and was returned with his brother Edmund in 1734 and after.

After the fall of Walpole in 1742, Waller followed his elder brother Edmund into opposition and voted consistently against the ministry. However, Edmund took office under the Government as Cofferer of the Household in 1744, whereupon Harry was considered a ‘New Ally’ for the Government. Harry retained his seat until the 1747 general election, when he stood down in favour of his nephew, Edmund Waller junior.

== Personal life ==
Waller married Elizabeth Stapylton, daughter of Sir John Stapylton, 3rd Baronet on 4 August 1744, His nephew Edmund was appointed Master of St. Katharine's Hospital and Waller himself was appointed as deputy master under him in February 1747, a position he held for the rest of his life.

Waller died on 29 July 1772.

Parliament of Great Britain
Preceded by Charles Colyear; The Earl of Shelburne	Member of Parliament for Chipping Wycombe; 1726– 1747; With: The Earl of Shelburne 1726-1727; William Lee 1727-1730; Sir Charles Vernon 1730-1734; Edmund Waller 1734; Sir Charles Vernon 1734-1741; Edmund Waller 1741-1747	Succeeded by Edmund Waller, junior Edmund Waller
