= Miles Hobart =

English politician

Sir Miles Hobart (Circa 1598 – 20 June 1632) was an English politician who sat in the House of Commons from 1628 to 1629.

Hobart was the son of Miles Hobart of London & Harleyford (though others have confused him with the son of Sir Henry Hobart, 1st Baronet). He matriculated at Queen's College, Oxford on 30 June 1615, aged 16 and was a student of Gray's Inn in 1616. He was knighted at Salisbury on 8 August 1623. In 1628, he was elected Member of Parliament for Marlow. In the debate of 2 March 1629 about the "illegal imposition of Tonnage and Poundage" he locked the door of the House of Commons, against the King's Messenger and was accordingly imprisoned in the Tower of London. He sat until 1629, when King Charles I of England decided to rule without Parliament for eleven years.

Shortly after release from prison, Hobart was fatally injured in a carriage accident on Holborn Hill. Miles Hobart died on 20 June 1632, at Harleyford, and was buried at Marlow. A monument tablet with bust in the parish church was voted to him by Parliament in 1647.

Parliament of England
Preceded by John Backhouse; Sir William Hicks, 1st Baronet	Member of Parliament for Marlow; 1628–1629; With: Sir John Backhouse	Parliament suspended until 1640
