= Sir Thomas Rich, 5th Baronet =

Royal Navy Admiral and Member of Parliament (c.1733–1803)

Admiral Sir Thomas Rich Bt
- Born: c.1733 Sonning, Berkshire, UK
- Died: 6 April 1803; Sonning, Berkshire, UK
- Military career
- Allegiance: United Kingdom
- Branch: Royal Navy
- Rank: Admiral
- Commands: HMS Anson; HMS Senegal; HMS Gibraltar; HMS Enterprise; HMS Culloden; HMS Vengeance
- Conflicts: American War of Independence; Napoleonic Wars

Admiral Sir Thomas Rich, 5th Baronet (c.1733 – 6 April 1803) was a British naval officer and Member of Parliament.

He was born the eldest son of Sir William Rich, 4th Baronet of Sonning, Berkshire and his wife, Elizabeth Royall. He joined the British Royal Navy and was commissioned lieutenant on 25 March 1758. He succeeded as 5th Baronet on the death of his father on 17 July 1762.

In 1763 he commissioned the 6-gun cutter HMS Anson for service in the English Channel until 1766. He was then promoted commander of the 14-gun sloop HMS Senegal in March 1769 for service on the North America Station. This was followed by the command in North America of the 24-gun HMS Gibraltar from February 1771 to 1773.

In April 1775 he took command of the new 28-gun frigate HMS Enterprise and sailed to the Mediterranean Sea, where in March 1778 he captured the 16-gun American vessel Hope. The following year they drove a French privateer ashore, captured an American schooner laden with tobacco and escorted supplies into the beleaguered port of Gibraltar, remaining there for several months.

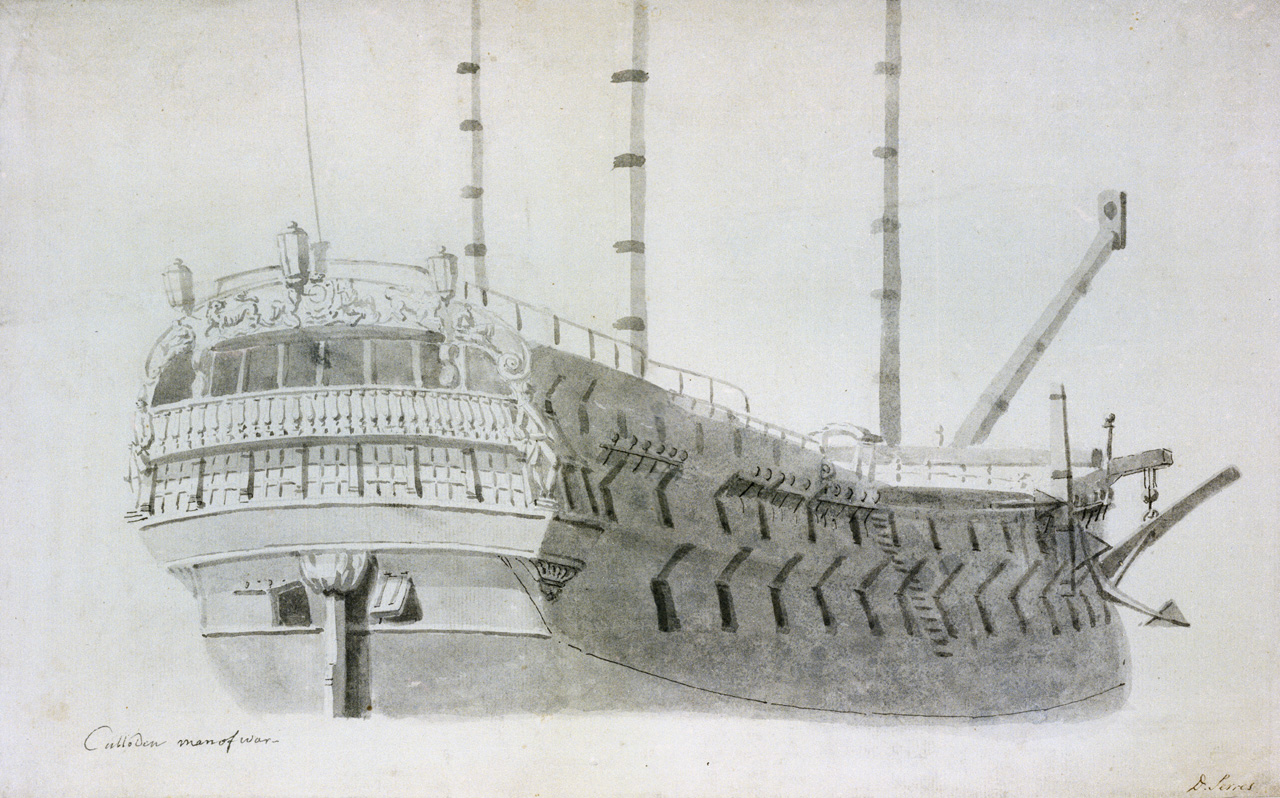
HMS Culloden

After the Moonlight Battle of 16 January 1780, when Rodney's fleet captured a number of Spanish vessels off Portugal as prizes, Rich was sent home in command of the captured 70-gun Princesa. He took her out to the Leeward Islands in November and took part in the Battle of Fort Royal on 29 April 1781, returning to England after a difficult voyage in HMS Princess Royal.

In 1786 he was asked to recommission the 74-gun guard ship HMS Culloden for three years, in 1790 the 74-gun HMS Vengeance and Culloden again in 1792.

He entered Parliament in 1784 as the member for Marlow, sitting until 1790.

He was promoted vice admiral on 1 June 1795 and advanced in retirement to admiral on 1 January 1801.

He died in Sonning on 6 April 1803. He had married Ann, the daughter and co-heiress of Richard Willis of Digswell, Hertfordshire. They left no children, and the baronetcy became extinct on his death. Rich however had six illegitimate children with Elizabeth Burt, the daughter of a general. Two of their sons, George Frederick Rich and Charles Rich entered the navy, rising to the ranks of post captain, and serving with Admiral Sir Edward William Campbell Rich Owen, who was the godson of Sir Thomas Rich. Sir Thomas's daughter Grace married Captain Anthony Abdy, while his youngest son Henry entered politics and was created a baronet in his own right in 1863.

Parliament of Great Britain
| Preceded by William Clayton; John Borlase Warren | Member of Parliament for Marlow; 1784–1790; With: William Clayton | Succeeded by Thomas Williams; William Lee-Antonie |
Baronetage of England
| Preceded by William Rich | Baronet (of Sunning); 1762 – 1803 | Extinct |
