= Corbet Woodall (gas engineer) =

English gas engineer

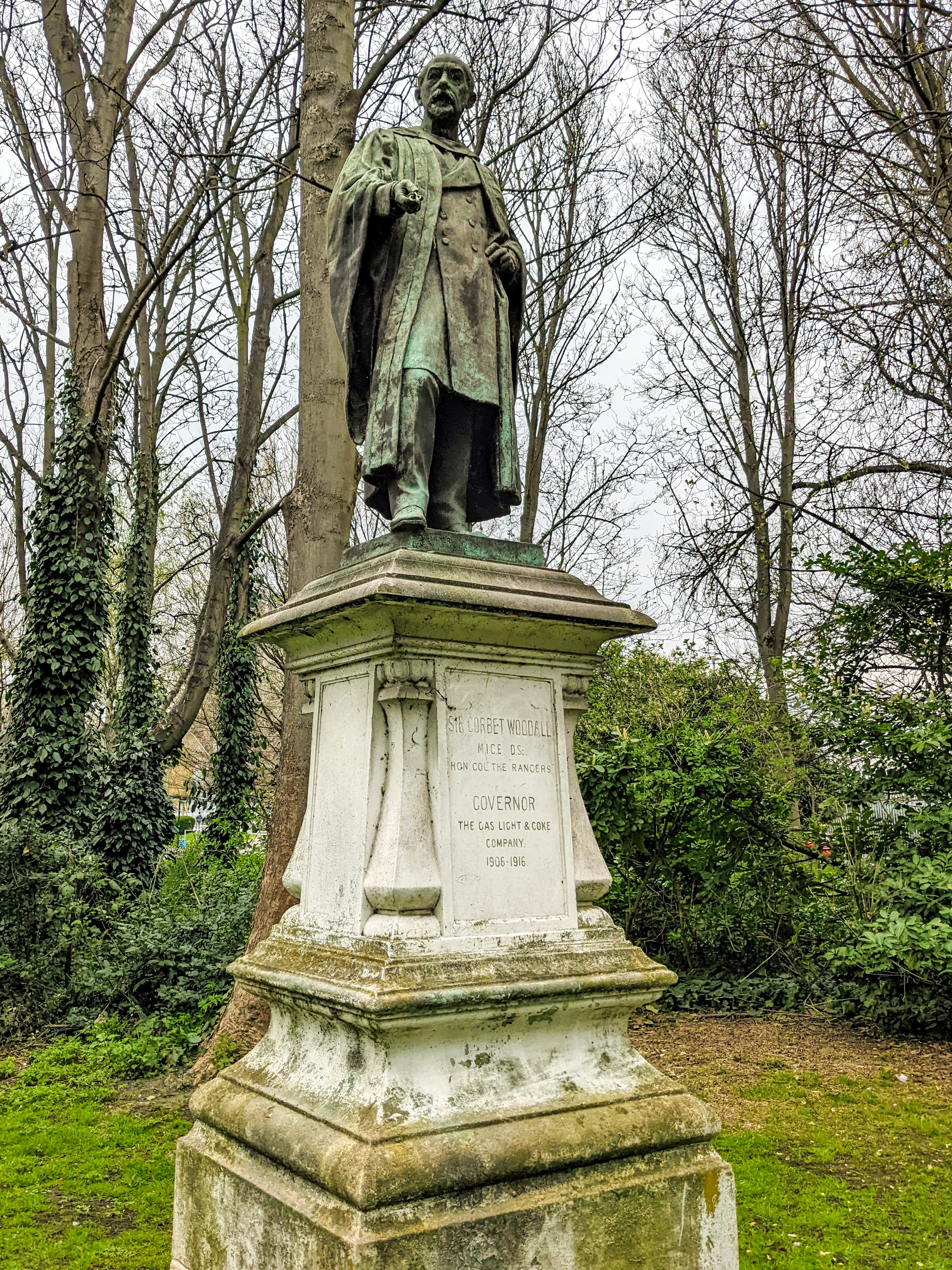
Statue of Sir Corbett Woodall by Arthur George Walker in Twelvetrees Crescent memorial garden

Sir Corbet Woodall (27 August 1841 – 17 May 1916) was an English gas engineer. He was Governor of the Gas Light and Coke Company from 1906 to 1916.

== Early life ==
He was born in Liverpool, where his father William Woodall (died 1871) was the manager of Liverpool gasworks. He was educated at the Congregationalist Crescent School in Liverpool, and followed his father and two older brothers in the coal gas industry. His eldest brother William Woodall was Liberal MP for Stoke-on-Trent and then Hanley.

== Career ==
Woodall moved to London to work for the Woolwich Equitable Gas Company in 1859. Approximately 6 years later, he became manager of the municipal gas works in Stockton-on-Tees. The small Stockton-on-Tees gasworks was substantially expanded under his management, and he also started providing his expertise as a consulting engineer to other gasworks in the north east of England. He returned to London in 1869 to become manager of the Phoenix Gas Company gasworks in Vauxhall, and became its chief engineer in 1872. He was in charge of the construction of the gas holders in Kennington Lane, near The Oval in 1878. He continued to work as a consulting engineer, and became a full-time consultant in private practice after the Phoenix Gas Company was acquired by the South Metropolitan Gas Company in 1880. In 1889 he bought Marle Hall in north Wales.

Recognized as a leading gas engineer, Woodall became a director of the Gas Light and Coke Company in 1897; it was the rival of Sir George Livesey's South Metropolitan Gas Company. Woodall helped the company become competitive through its efficiency, He succeeded Sir William Thomas Makins, Governor of the Gas Light and Coke Company in 1906: at this point it was the largest gas company in the world. Woodall tried to foster good industrial relations, introducing a co-partnership scheme.

Woodall was honorary colonel of the 12th Battalion, the London Regiment ("the Rangers"), a Territorial Force battalion mainly composed of gas company employees. He was also a partner of Edward B. Ellington in devising schemes for hydraulic power networks in various cities in the UK and Australia, including the London Hydraulic Power Company.

== Honours ==
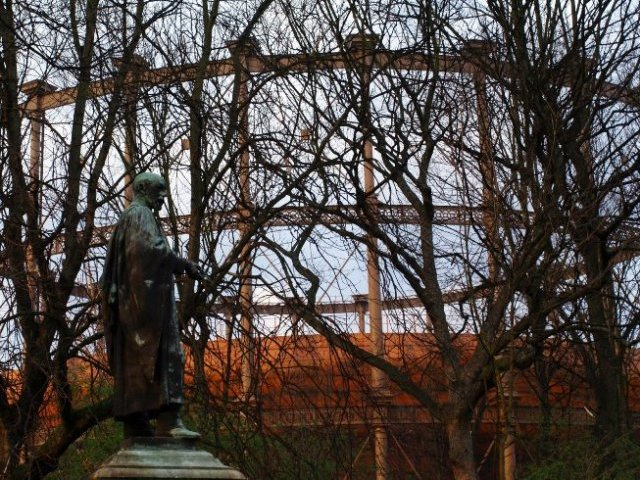
The statue of Sir Corbett Woodall, with gas holders of Bromley Gas Works visible behind

He was a member of the Gas Institute (later the Institution of Gas Engineers and now the Institution of Gas Engineers and Managers), the Institution of Civil Engineers and the Institution of Mechanical Engineers. He was elected president of the Institution of Gas Engineers three times, in 1877, 1897 and 1912. He became a justice of the peace in Bromley in 1911, received an honorary DSc from the University of Leeds in 1912, and was knighted for services to the gas industry in 1913.

He retired to the south of France in 1914, after he started to suffer from heart problems, and died in 1916. He was followed as Governor of the Gas Light and Coke Company by John Miles.

His Grade II listed statue stands in the gas employees' war memorial garden in Twelvetrees Crescent. Originally it was erected at Beckton Gas Works before 1926; it was moved to its present location in a garden at Twelvetrees Crescent, Bromley by Bow, near Bromley Gas Works, north of the London Gas Museum (closed in 1998), and close to a war memorial to employees of the Gas Light and Coke Company.

== Family ==
Woodall married Anne Whiteman in 1865. They had five daughters and five sons; four of the sons also worked in the gas industry. Henry joined the gas engineering consultancy practice and was also a director of the Gas Light and Coke Company; Harold worked with Arthur Duckham to develop continuous vertical retort for manufacturing gas from coal, and they founded Woodall-Duckham.
