= William Lee (English judge) =

British jurist and politician

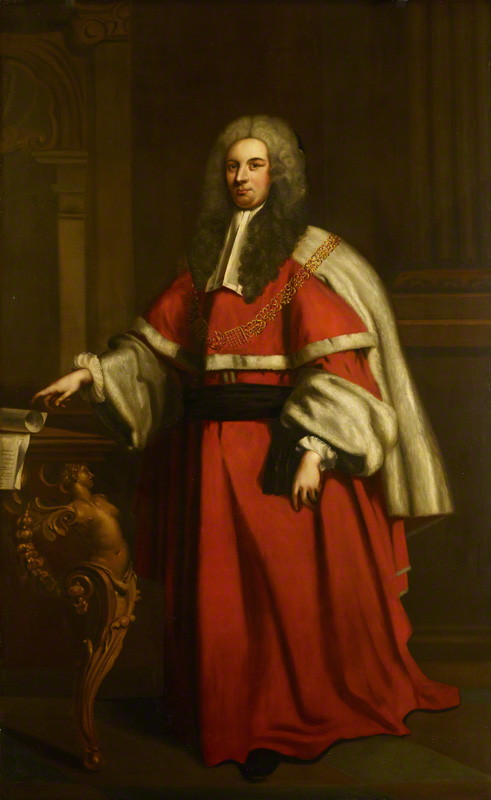
Sir William Lee

Sir William Lee PC (2 August 1688 – 8 April 1754) was a British jurist and politician.

== Life ==
He was the second son of Sir Thomas Lee, 2nd Baronet. He matriculated at Wadham College, Oxford in 1704, shortly after entering the Middle Temple; he did not take a degree, but was called to the bar in 1710. Member of Parliament for Wycombe from 1727 until 1730, he gave up the seat when he became a Justice of the King's Bench.

Lee was Lord Chief Justice of England and Wales from 8 June 1737 until his sudden death in 1754. He was appointed formally as Chancellor of the Exchequer as a temporary expedient on 8 March 1754, when Henry Pelham died, with his brother Sir George Lee as Under Treasurer of the Exchequer, until 6 April, his own death.

Lord Campbell noted that Lee "certainly stood up for the rights of woman more strenuously than any English judge before or since his time".

== Notes ==
Parliament of Great Britain
Preceded by The Earl of Shelburne; Harry Waller	Member of Parliament for Wycombe; 1727 – 1730; With: Harry Waller	Succeeded by Harry Waller; Sir Charles Vernon
Legal offices
Preceded by The Lord Hardwicke	Lord Chief Justice of the King's Bench; 1737–1754	Succeeded by Sir Dudley Ryder
Political offices
Preceded by Henry Pelham	Chancellor of the Exchequer; 1754	Succeeded by Henry Bilson Legge
