= George Bruere =

George Bruere (died 1743), of Covent Garden, London, and Great Marlow, Buckinghamshire, was an English Member of Parliament (MP).

He was a Member of the Parliament of England for Great Marlow 8 December 1710 to 1722.
