= Renn Hampden (died 1852) =

Renn Hampden was a Member of Parliament (MP) for Great Marlow from 1842 to 1847. Initially he lost the seat by one vote in the general election of 1841 but after an election petition two votes for his opponent were struck off, one for bribery and one by disqualification of the voter, and Hampden was deemed elected in April 1842. Hampden was a Conservative.
