= Thomas Williams of Llanidan =

Welsh politician (1737-1802)

The Right Honourable Thomas Williams
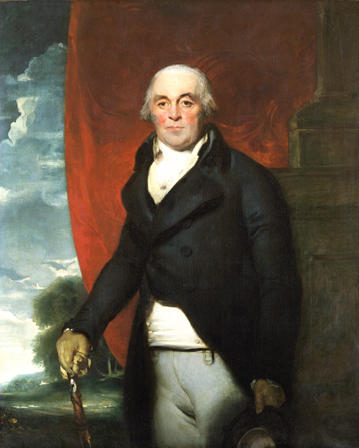

Member of Parliament for Great Marlow
- In office 1790–1802
- Preceded by: William Clayton; Thomas Rich
- Succeeded by: Pascoe Grenfell; Owen Williams

Personal details
- Born: 13 May 1737 Llanidan, Anglesey, Wales, Great Britain
- Died: 30 November 1802 (aged 65)

Thomas Williams (13 May 1737 – 30 November 1802) was a Welsh industrialist and politician who was a member of Parliament for Great Marlow and High Sheriff of Anglesey. Doing business in copper mining and manufacturing, he campaigned against the abolition of the transatlantic slave trade and was the richest man in Wales at the time of his death.

== Life ==
Thomas Williams was born in Llanidan, Anglesey, the son of Owen Williams of Cefn Coch in Llansadwrn.

In the 18th century, there was a significant shortage of food for labouring people. Williams, known to his Welsh speaking workmen as Twm Chwarae Teg ("Tom Fairplay"), once complained to the magistrate at Llanidan that the villagers on Anglesey raided his fields and stole the turnips intended for his cattle and used them to feed their families. His business rival, Matthew Boulton, called Williams the "copper king" – "the despotick sovereign of the copper trade". To his friend and agent he said, "Let me advise you to be extremely cautious in your dealings with Williams". He spoke of Williams as "a perfect tyrant and not over tenacious of his word and will screw damned hard when he has got anybody in his vice". Of the Cornish producers, Boulton said "they would not have submitted to be kicked and piss'd on by me as they have been by them" (Williams and his partner Wilkinson).

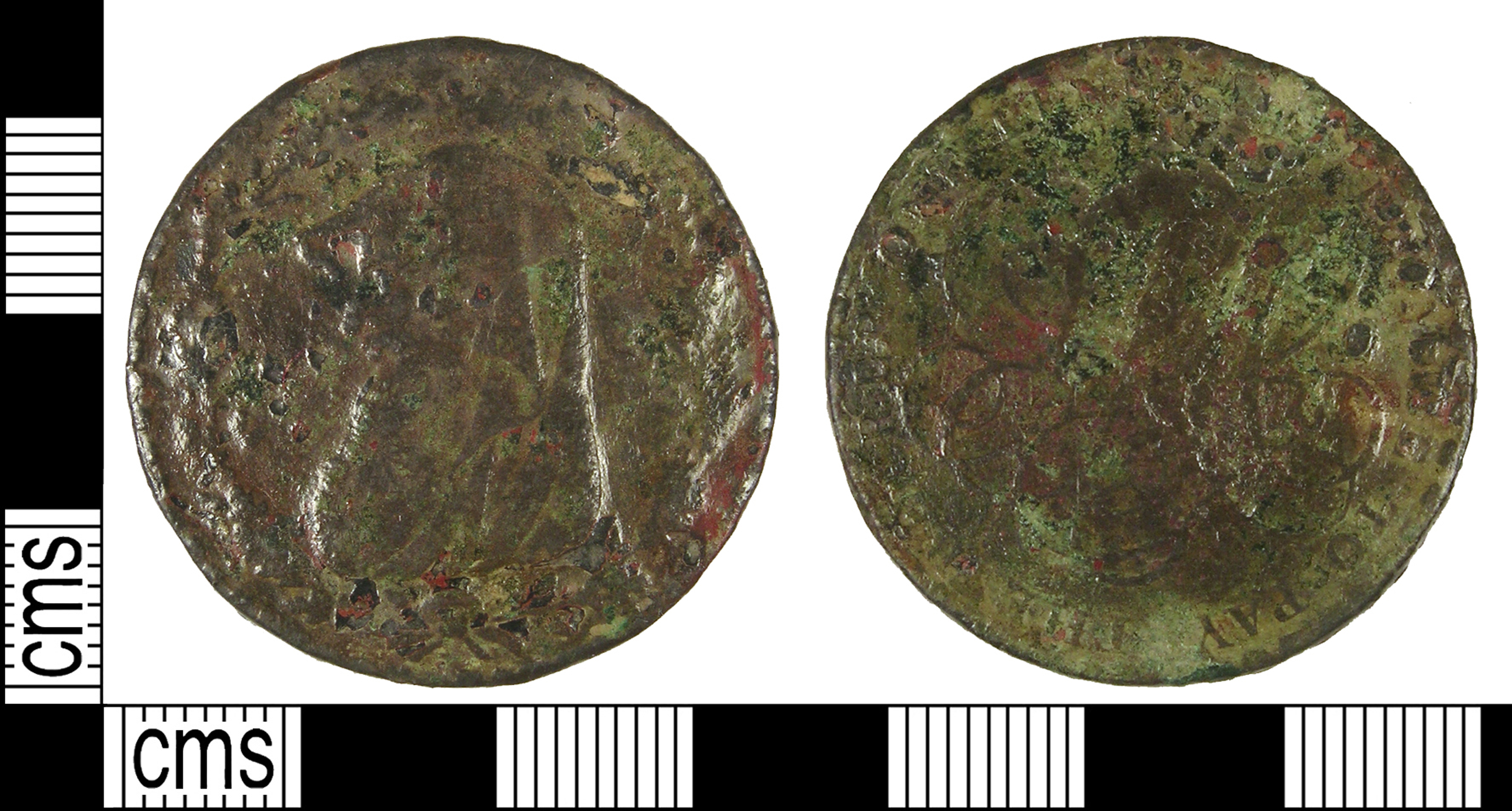
Trade token, value one penny, issued by Williams to pay workers at the Parys Mining Company

Williams' tenacity as a lawyer was very evident when acting for the Hughes family of Llysdulas who were in an acrimonious dispute with Sir Nicholas Bayly of Plas Newydd concerning the Parys Mountain copper mine. This dispute, which ran for over nine years, involved the interpretation of that very unsatisfactory testamentary device called a moiety. At one stage the dispute involved four years of expensive litigation in the Chancery court with the Attorney General and the Solicitor General acting for opposing sides and was not finally settled until 1778. In that year Sir Nicholas leased his own copper mine to a London banker John Dawes (a secret associate of Williams) for 21 years.

Williams emerged from the dispute as the managing partner with the Revd Edward Hughes and John Dawes in the Parys Mine Company. This under Williams control was cheap to run and extremely productive. His great problem was to obtain an attractive price for the copper. He faced a cartel of copper smelters whose aim was to buy cheap and sell dear. He moved decisively to establish his own smelting facilities and quickly entered into an agreement with John Mackay to establish an industrial complex at Ravenhead near St Helens in Lancashire. He also established warehousing and copper manufacturing and finishing facilities, and even a mint – thus creating a vertical organisation. In 1788, Williams purchased the Temple Mills at Bisham in Berkshire. He built himself a fine mansion there called Temple House and used the mills for smelting copper brought from his Welsh mines. He became MP for the nearby town of Marlow in Buckinghamshire.

He also acted quickly to absorb or control other producers – notably the Cornish mines to produce a complete response to the cartel. Although always the driving force, Williams built up and controlled a major commercial organisation and surrounded himself with able staff. The Revd Edward was always a sleeping partner but younger brother Michael Hughes was an able manager. Other partners and staff included The Earl of Uxbridge, Owen Williams, and Thomas Harrison.

His business organisation was first rate. He developed the technique of establishing his various businesses in separate companies. Thus the Parys Mine Company controlled its own smelting in South Wales, Lancashire and copper manufacture at Holywell and Wraysbury. Likewise the Mona mine (adjoining Parys) output was smelted by the Stanley Company in both Lancashire and South Wales. Other Companies dealt with manufacture at Greenfield near Flint and in the Thames Valley, Chemical Works (vitriol) at Garston Liverpool and still others with warehousing and banking.

Williams had built copper works at Flint and Penclawdd where he made copper and brass products. Many of these materials were for use in the African slave trade. These copper trinkets etc. were largely exported to Africa for use as payment for slaves, who were then transported to the West Indies and sold. The proceeds were then used to purchase commodities for import into Britain. Williams claimed to have invested £70,000 in this trade and petitioned parliament in 1788 when a bill was being discussed to prevent British ships from carrying slaves. Williams actively fought against the abolition of slavery and is said also to have introduced the use of copper bolts to fix the copper sheeting to naval vessels and it would appear that he sold them to all sides in the naval conflicts. When he died in 1802, 1,200 people were employed in his Parys and Mona mines, but five years later the number had dropped to 120. This owing partly to the collapse of copper prices, but also to the exhaustion of the known local copper deposits – but no doubt largely resulting from the death of the firm's great driving force.

He was High Sheriff of Anglesey from 1790 to 1791.

== Family ==
Williams married around 1763 Catherine Lloyd, daughter of John Lloyd of Anglesey. They had two sons and three daughters.

== See also ==
- Oxford Dictionary of National Biography article by J. R. Harris, Williams, Thomas (1737–1802) revised May 2005 accessed 21 November 2006]

Parliament of Great Britain
Preceded by William Clayton; Thomas Rich	Member of Parliament for Great Marlow; 1790–1800; With: William Lee-Antonie 1790–96; Owen Williams from 1796	Succeeded by Parliament of the United Kingdom
Parliament of the United Kingdom
Preceded by Parliament of Great Britain	Member of Parliament for Great Marlow; 1801–1802; With: Owen Williams	Succeeded by Pascoe Grenfell; Owen Williams
