= Hobbs (surname) =

Family name

Hobbs is a surname. Notable people with this surname include:

- Abigail Hobbs (fl. 1692), victim of Salem Witch trials
- Alan Hobbs (born 1944), English cricketer
- Albert Hobbs (1822–1897), American politician from New York
- Aleia Hobbs (born 1996), American track and field athlete
- Alexander R. Hobbs (1852–1929), American lawyer and politician from Virginia
- Alfred Charles Hobbs (1812–1891), American locksmith and inventor
- Allen Hobbs (1899–1960), American naval captain and governor of American Samoa
- Allyson Hobbs, American historian
- Angie Hobbs (born 1961), British philosopher
- Anne Hobbs (born 1959), English tennis player
- Arthur Hobbs, multiple people
- Basil Deacon Hobbs (1894–1965), British and Canadian aviator
- Becky Hobbs (born 1950), American musician
- Ben Hobbs (born 2003), Australian rules footballer
- Bill Hobbs (American football) (1946–2004), American football linebacker
- Bill Hobbs (baseball) (1893–1945), American baseball shortstop
- Bill Hobbs (rower) (1949–2020), American Olympic rower, brother of rower Franklin Hobbs
- Bob Hobbs (1926–2006), Australian rugby footballer
- Braydon Hobbs (born 1989), American basketball player
- Brian Kenneth Hobbs (1937–2004), Australian physician
- Bruce Hobbs (1920–2005), English jockey and trainer
- Bruce Edward Hobbs (born 1936), Australian geologist
- Catherine Hobbs (born 1968), British mathematician and educator
- Cathy Hobbs, American television host and interior designer
- Carleton Hobbs (1898–1978), English actor
- Cecil Hobbs (1907–1991), American historian
- Chelsea Hobbs (born 1985), Canadian actress
- Christopher Hobbs (born 1950), English composer
- Clark S. Hobbs (1888–1973), American reporter and editor
- Colin Hobbs (born 1946), Australian rules footballer
- Daniel Hobbs, American politician from Maine
- Dara Hobbs (born 1972), American operatic soprano
- Darwin Hobbs (born 1968), American gospel singer
- Daryl Hobbs (born 1968), American football wide receiver
- David Hobbs, multiple people
- Deliverance Hobbs (fl. 1692), victim of Salem Witch trials
- Eddie Hobbs (born 1962), Irish celebrity accountant
- Edward Hobbs (1868–1936), Australian politician
- Ellis Hobbs (born 1983), American football cornerback
- Fern Hobbs (1883–1964), American lawyer from Oregon
- Franklin Hobbs (born 1947), American Olympic rower, brother of rower Bill Hobbs
- Frederick Hobbs (disambiguation), multiple people
- Fredric Hobbs (1931–2018), American filmmaker
- Garry Hobbs, character in BBC soap opera EastEnders
- Gary Hobbs (born 1960), American musician and actor
- Gene Hobbs (born 1973), American technical diver and medical simulation expert
- George Hobbs (1907–1962), Canadian engineer and politician
- Gregory J. Hobbs Jr. (1944–2021), American lawyer and judge from Colorado
- Harry Hobbs, Australian lawyer and educator
- Hayford Hobbs (1890–1957), British film actor
- Helen Hobbs (born 1952), American medical researcher
- Henry Hobbs (American football) (1887–1931), American football player and coach
- Herschel Hobbs (1907–1995), American clergy
- Homer Hobbs (1923–1997), American football guard and coach
- Horton H. Hobbs Jr. (1914–1994), American taxonomist and carcinologist
- Howard Hobbs (born 1950), Australian politician
- Howard Frederick Hobbs (1902–1982), South Australian inventor
- Jack Hobbs (disambiguation), multiple people
- Jerry Hobbs (born 1942), American computer scientist
- Jessica Hobbs (born 1967), New Zealand television director
- Jock Hobbs (1960–2012), New Zealand rugby player and administrator
- John Hobbs, multiple people
- Jordan Hobbs (born 2003), American basketball player
- Julie Pullin (née Hobbs) (born 1975), British tennis player
- Karl Hobbs (born 1961), American basketball coach
- Katherine Hobbs, Canadian politician
- Katie Hobbs (born 1969), 24th governor of Arizona
- Katrina Hobbs (born 1971), New Zealand actress
- Keith Hobbs, multiple people
- Kevin Hobbs (born 1983), American football cornerback
- Leigh Hobbs (born 1953), Australian artist and author
- Leland Hobbs (1892–1966), United States Army officer
- Leonard S. Hobbs (1896–1977), American engineer
- Lillian Hobbs (1882–1952), New Zealand woman acquitted of murder
- Lucy Hobbs Taylor (1833–1910), first American woman to graduate from dental school
- Luke Hobbs, character in The Fast and the Furious
- Lyndall Hobbs (born 1952), Australian director and producer
- Lynne Hobbs, character in BBC soap opera EastEnders
- Marian Hobbs (born 1947), New Zealand politician
- Margaret Hobbs (1909–1997), Canadian educator and politician
- Mary Hobbs, multiple people
- Maureen Hobbs, New Zealand lawn bowler
- May Elliot Hobbs (1877–1956), Scottish singer and dancer
- Merv Hobbs (born 1942), Australian rules footballer
- Michael Hobbs, multiple people
- Nate Hobbs (born 1999), American football cornerback
- Nicholas Hobbs (1915–1983), American psychologist
- Nicola Hobbs (born 1987), English footballer
- Noah Hobbs (born 2004), English cyclist
- Norman Hobbs (1900–1966), English cricketer
- Patrick E. Hobbs (born 1960), American lawyer and educator
- Peter Hobbs, multiple people
- Philip Hobbs (born 1955), British horse trainer
- Powerhouse Hobbs (born 1991), American professional wrestler
- Randy Jo Hobbs (1948–1993), American musician
- Reginald Hobbs (1908–1977), British Army officer
- Renee Hobbs, American educator
- Richard Hobbs (ecologist), Australian ecologist and educator
- Richard Hobbs (organist) (c. 1726 – 1810), English organist
- Richard Hobbs (politician) (1833–1910), New Zealand politician
- Robert Hobbs, American art historian and curator
- Robin Hobbs (born 1942), English cricketer
- Roger Hobbs (1988–2016), American writer
- Roy Hobbs (tennis) (born 1989), Singaporean tennis player
- Rudy Hobbs (born 1976), American politician from Michigan
- Sam Hobbs (1887–1952), American politician from Alabama
- Sam Hobbs (rugby union) (born 1988), Welsh rugby player
- Sarah Hobbs (born 1970), American artist
- Simon Hobbs, American journalist
- Steve Hobbs (disambiguation), multiple people
- Sue Hobbs (born 1956/1957), Australian para-athlete and wheelchair basketball player
- Suzanne M. Babich (née Hobbs), American scientist and writer
- Talbot Hobbs (1864–1938), Australian architect and military officer
- Tameka Bradley Hobbs, American historian, educator and writer
- Terrance Hobbs (born 1970), American musician
- Thomas Hobbs, multiple people
- Truman McGill Hobbs (1921–2015), American judge from Alabama
- Ulysses Hobbs (1832–1911), American politician from Maryland
- Vanessa Hobbs (born 1987), British gymnast
- Vinnie Hobbs, American film editor
- William Hobbs (disambiguation), multiple people
- Zoe Hobbs (born 1997), New Zealand track and field athlete

== See also ==
- Hobbes (disambiguation)
