= Hobby (disambiguation) =

A hobby is an activity done regularly for pleasure.

Hobby may also refer to:

- Hobby (surname)
- Hobby (bird), a small, very fast falcon
- Irish Hobby, a type of horse ridden by Hobelars in the Middle Ages
- Hobby Airport, a public airport serving the Houston, Texas, area in the United States
- Hobbyist, slang for a sex client soliciting online

== Ships ==
- USS Hobby (DD-610), a United States Navy destroyer in commission from 1942 to 1946
- USS William M. Hobby (DE-286), a United States Navy destroyer escort converted during construction into the high-speed transport USS William M. Hobby (APD-95)
- USS William M. Hobby (APD-95), a United States high-speed transport in commission from 1945 to 1946

== See also ==
- Hobby horse
- Hobby horse (toy)
- Hobbe (disambiguation)
- Hobbie (disambiguation)
