= John Hobbs =

John Hobbs may refer to:

- John Hobbs (ornithologist) (1920–1990), police officer and ornithologist
- John Hobbs (baseball) (born 1956), Major League Baseball pitcher
- John Raymond Hobbs (1929–2008), professor of chemical immunology
- John Hobbs (missionary) (1800–1883), New Zealand missionary, artisan and interpreter
- John Hobbs (cricketer, born 1935), English cricketer
- John Hobbs, a county sheriff in Southeast Missouri in 1942
- Jack Hobbs (John Berry Hobbs, 1882–1963), English cricketer

== See also ==
- Jack Hobbs (disambiguation)
