= William Hobby =

William Hobby may refer to:

- William M. Hobby (1899–1942), United States Navy officer killed in action during World War II for whom a U.S. Navy ship was named
  - USS William M. Hobby, a United States Navy high-speed transport
- William P. Hobby (1878–1964), American publisher and politician
- William P. Hobby Jr. (born 1932), his son, American publisher and politician
