= Hobbes (disambiguation) =

Hobbes is primarily used to refer to:

Thomas Hobbes (1588–1679), English philosopher and creator of the social contract theory

Hobbes may also refer to:

== People ==
- Fredric Hobbs (1931–2018), American experimental filmmaker
- Halliwell Hobbes (1877–1962), actor
- John Oliver Hobbes (1867–1906), pen-name of Pearl Mary Teresa Craigie
- Roger Hobbes, English politician

== Characters ==
- Hobbes (Calvin and Hobbes), a tiger from the comic strip Calvin and Hobbes
- Hobbes, a character in the Fables comic book series
- Miranda Hobbes, a character on Sex and the City
- Ralgha nar Hhallas, known as "Hobbes", a character in the computer game series Wing Commander

== See also ==
- Hob (disambiguation)
- Hobb (disambiguation)
- Hobbe (disambiguation)
- Hobbs (disambiguation)
- Hobbie (disambiguation)
- Hobby (disambiguation)
- Hobbism
