= William Hobbs =

William Hobbs or Bill Hobbs may refer to:

- William Hobbs (politician) (1822–1890), doctor and politician in colonial Queensland
- William Herbert Hobbs (1864–1952), American geologist
- Bill Hobbs (baseball) (1893–1945), shortstop in Major League Baseball
- William J. Hobbs (1903–1977), American businessman, president of the Coca-Cola Company
- William G. Hobbs (1927–2012), Canadian artist
- William Hobbs (choreographer) (1939–2018), choreographer of staged fights
- Bill Hobbs (American football) (1946–2004), American football player
- Will Hobbs (1947–2025), American author
- Bill Hobbs (rower) (1949–2020), American rower
