= Hobbe =

Hobbe may refer to:

- Hobbe, a diminutive of the given name Robert (name)
- Hobbe Smith (1862-1942) Dutch post-impressionist painter
- Hobbe, the Chief, a playing card in the card game Happy Families
- Father Hobbe, a character from the 2000 Bernard Cornwell Grailquest novels, see Vagabond (novel)
- The Hobbe, a fictional race from the Fable videogame RPG series, see Fable: The Journey

== See also ==
- Cyrus Hobbi (born 1993) U.S. American football player
- Robert (disambiguation)
- Hobbie (disambiguation)
- Hobby (disambiguation)
- Hobbes (disambiguation)
- Hobbs (disambiguation)
- Hobb (disambiguation)
- Hob (disambiguation)
