= Hobbie =

Hobbie may refer to:

== Places ==
- Hobbie Ridge, a ridge that projects from the middle of the head of Meander Glacier

== People ==
- Glen Hobbie (1936–2013), American professional baseball player
- Holly Hobbie (born 1944), American writer, watercolorist, and illustrator
  - Holly Hobbie (character), the eponymous character she created
- Sarah Hobbie (fl. 1986–2014), American ecologist
- Selah R. Hobbie (1797–1854), U.S. Representative from New York

== Other uses ==
- Hobbie Accessible, American automobile manufactured in Hampton, Iowa from 1908 until 1909

== See also ==
- Hobby (disambiguation)
- Hobbe (disambiguation)
- Hobbes (disambiguation)
