= Hobby (surname) =

Hobby is a surname. Notable people with the surname include:

- Alfred Marmaduke Hobby (1836–1881), American merchant, politician, and poet, and Confederate States of America military officer
- Bertram Maurice Hobby (1905–1983), English entomologist
- James H. Hobby (1835–1882), United States Navy officer for whom a U.S. Navy ship was named
- Matt Hobby (born 1985), American actor and comedian
- Oveta Culp Hobby (1905–1995), American publisher, federal government official, and Women's Army Corps officer
- Sir Philip Hobby, an alternative spelling for Sir Philip Hoby (1505–1558), sometimes also spelled Sir Philip Hobbye, an English ambassador
- William M. Hobby, Jr., (1899–1942), United States Navy officer killed in action during World War II for whom a U.S. Navy ship was named
- William P. Hobby (1878–1964), American publisher and politician and the father of William P. Hobby, Jr.
- William P. Hobby, Jr. (born 1932), American publisher and politician and the son of William P. Hobby
