= Hobbs =

Hobbs may refer to:

== Surname ==
- Hobbs (surname)

=== Fictional ===
- Russel Hobbs of the virtual band Gorillaz
- Luke Hobbs, a character from The Fast and the Furious film series
- Lynne Hobbs, a character from EastEnders
- Garry Hobbs, a character from EastEnders
- Roy Hobbs (baseball), a baseball player in The Natural

== Places ==
=== Antarctica ===
- Hobbs Coast

=== Australia ===
- Hobbs Island (Tasmania)

=== United States ===
- Hobbs Island, Alabama
- Hobbs, Indiana
- Hobbs, Kentucky
- Hobbs, Maryland
- Hobbs, New Mexico
- Hobbs, Texas

== Companies ==
- Arding & Hobbs, a former London department store
- Hobbs Ltd, women's clothing stores in the United Kingdom
- Russell Hobbs Inc, an American manufacturer of home appliances

== Other uses ==
- Hobbs Act, a U.S. federal law
- Hobbs meter, a device that records elapsed time
- Hobbs Kessler (born 2003), American runner

== See also ==
- Hob (disambiguation)
- Hobb (disambiguation)
- Hobbes (disambiguation)
- Hobbism
