= Hob =

Hob, HOB or Hobs may refer to:

== Businesses and organizations ==
- Heart of Brooklyn, a tourism-related non-profit organization in New York City
- HOB GmbH & Co KG, an international computer company
- Hobs Reprographics, a British printer
- Hemne Orkladal Billag, a defunct Norwegian transport company
- House of Blues, a chain of music halls and restaurants

== People ==
- Hob Broun (1950–1987), American author
- Hob Bryan (born 1952), American politician
- Hob Hiller (1893–1956), American Major League Baseball player

== Fictional characters ==
- Hob Gadling, in The Sandman comic book series by Neil Gaiman
- Hob, a robot-like creature in the webcomic Dresden Codak
- Hob, in RoboCop 2

== Codes ==
- hob, ISO 639-3 code for the Mari language (Madang Province) of Papua New Guinea
- HOB, station code for Hoboken Terminal, New Jersey, United States
- HOB, IATA code for Lea County Regional Airport, New Mexico, United States
- HOB, UK code for HM Prison High Down, Surrey

== Other uses ==
- Gear hob, a tool used in gear-making
- A male ferret
- A stake used as a target in the game of quoits
- Hob (folklore), a household spirit in Northern England
- Hob or Old Hob, a nickname for the Devil
- Hob (hearth), a projection, shelf, grate or bench for holding food or utensils
- Cooktop, the top cooking surface on a kitchen stove
- Hob (unit), a Korean unit of volume equal to about 180 ml
- Hob (video game), an action-adventure game
- Hoboken-Verzeichnis, abbreviated "Hob.", the catalogue of the compositions of Joseph Haydn
- Hob, 2004 debut album of Egyptian singer Tamer Hosny
- House Office Building, where members of the United States House of Representatives work
- A nail on the sole of a hobnailed boot
- House of Balloons, 2011 mixtape by the Weeknd
  - House of Balloons / Glass Table Girls, title track from the mixtape by the Weeknd

== See also ==
- Hobb (disambiguation)
- Hobbe (disambiguation)
- Hobbes (disambiguation)
- Hobbs (disambiguation)
