= Hobb =

Hobb may refer to:

== Places ==
- Hobb Lake, Winslow Township, New Jersey, USA; a reservoir
- Hobb's Hill, Bodmin Moor, Cornwall, England, UK; a torr, see List of geographical tors

=== Facilities and structures ===
- Hobb Hotel, a 19th-century landmark in Woodland, Washington State, USA

== People ==
=== Surname ===
- Robin Hobb (born 1952) U.S. author

=== Given name ===
- "Hobb", a diminutive form for Robert (name)
- Hobb Wilson (1904–1977) Canadian hockey player

=== Fictional characters ===
- Edwin Hobb, computer scientist on the 2015 UK TV series HUM∀NS
- Graham Hobb, from the 1979 UK TV series The Omega Factor, see List of The Omega Factor episodes
- Walter Hobb from the horror franchise Friday the 13th, see List of Friday the 13th characters
- The Hobbs (Hobb Family) from the musical comedy Kreepy Hallow, by playwright The Kreep
- Hobb from the 1993 TV series Cadillacs and Dinosaurs
- Hobb, an anthropomorphic mole from the novel series The Mistmantle Chronicles; see List of The Mistmantle Chronicles characters

== Other uses ==
- "Hobb" (1993 song), a single by UK band C Cat Trance

== See also ==
- Bob (disambiguation)
- Hob (disambiguation)
- Hobbe (disambiguation)
- Hobbism
- Hobbs (disambiguation)
- Rob (disambiguation)
- Robert (disambiguation)
