= Hob (hearth) =

Cooking implement

In a kitchen the hob is a projection, shelf, grate or bench for holding food or utensils at the back or side of a hearth (fireplace) to keep them warm, or an internal chimney-corner. In modern British English usage, the word refers to a cooktop or hotplate, as distinguished from an oven.

== Etymology ==
The word is a noun meaning approximately "holder", derived from the Old English verb habban "to have, hold". The word hub "support of a disk or wheel" is apparently from the same source.

== Gallery ==
Hearths and hobs

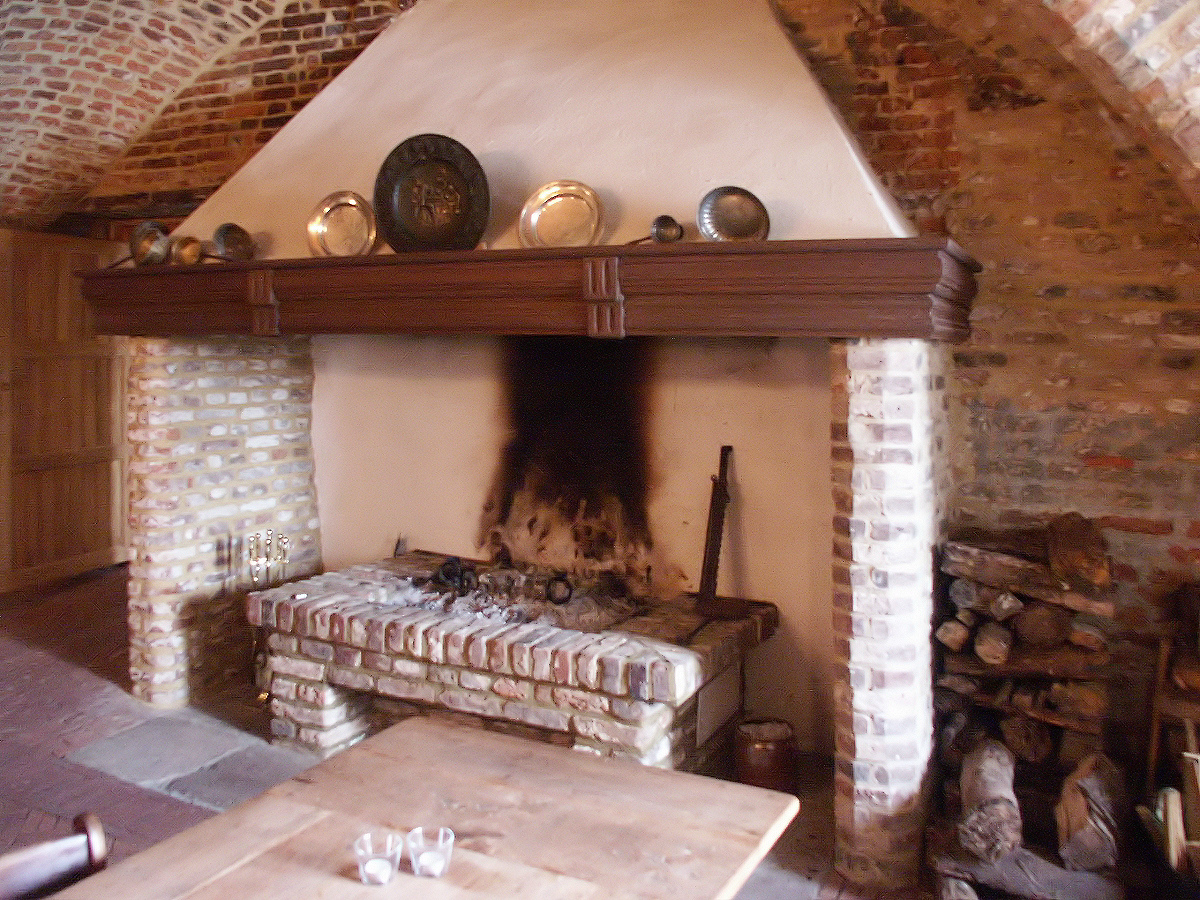
A fireplace in a German castle showing a brick hob.

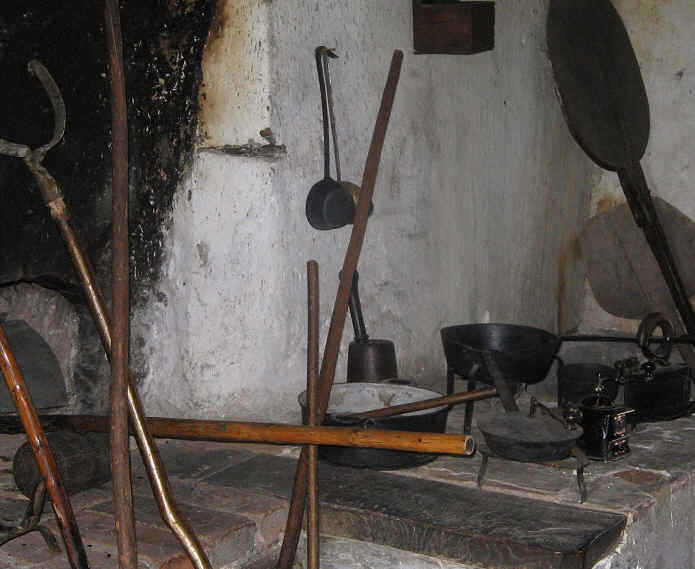
Hearth and hob in a traditional Slovenian kitchen.

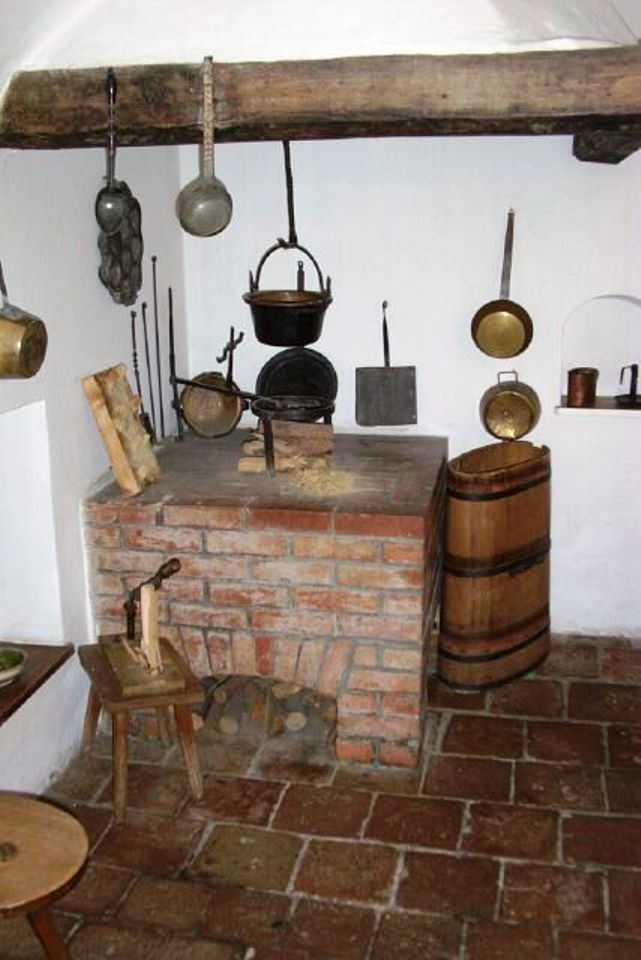
Reconstructed hearth and hob in the Fuggerei.

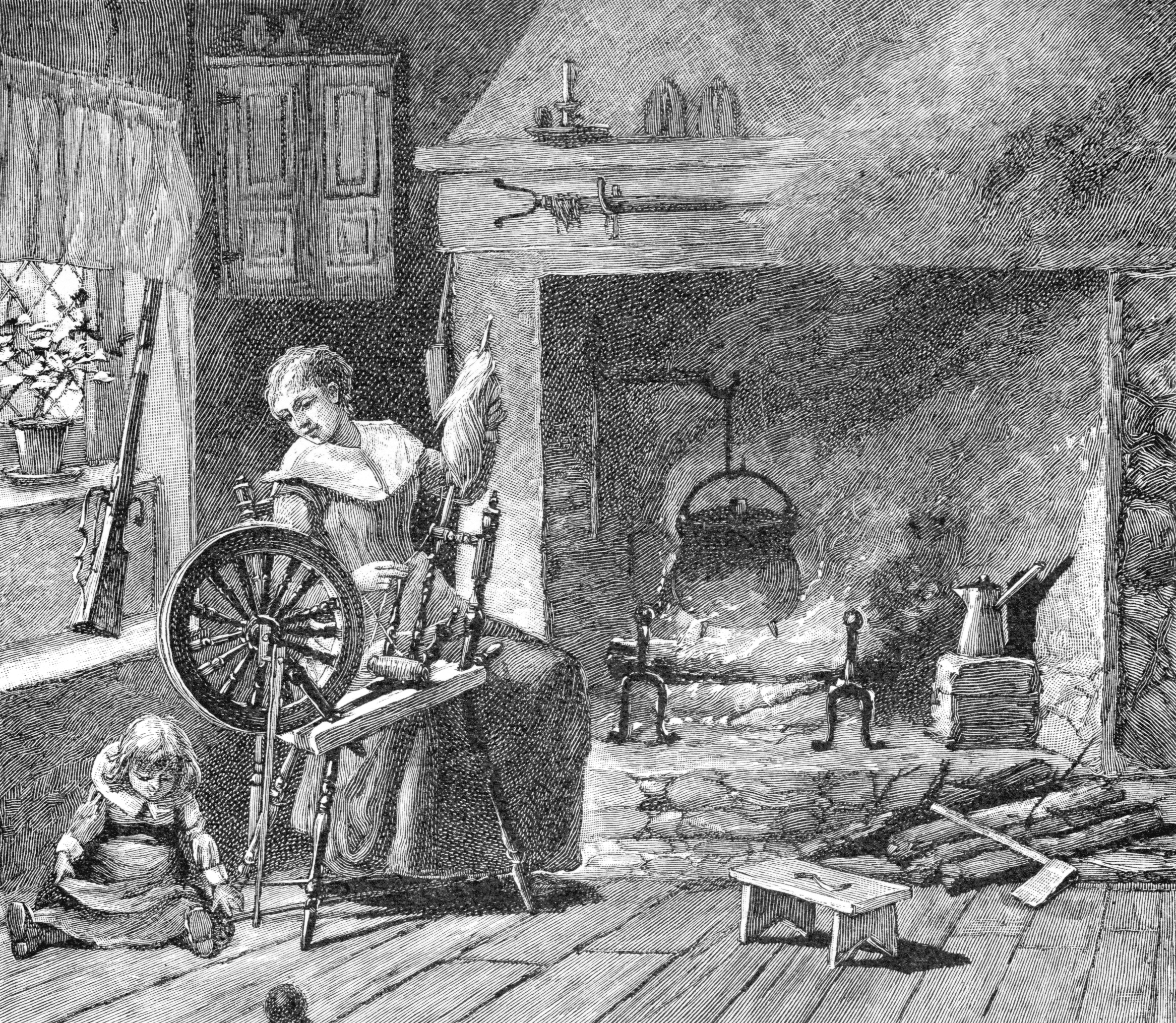
Colonial kitchen with a pitcher on the hob.

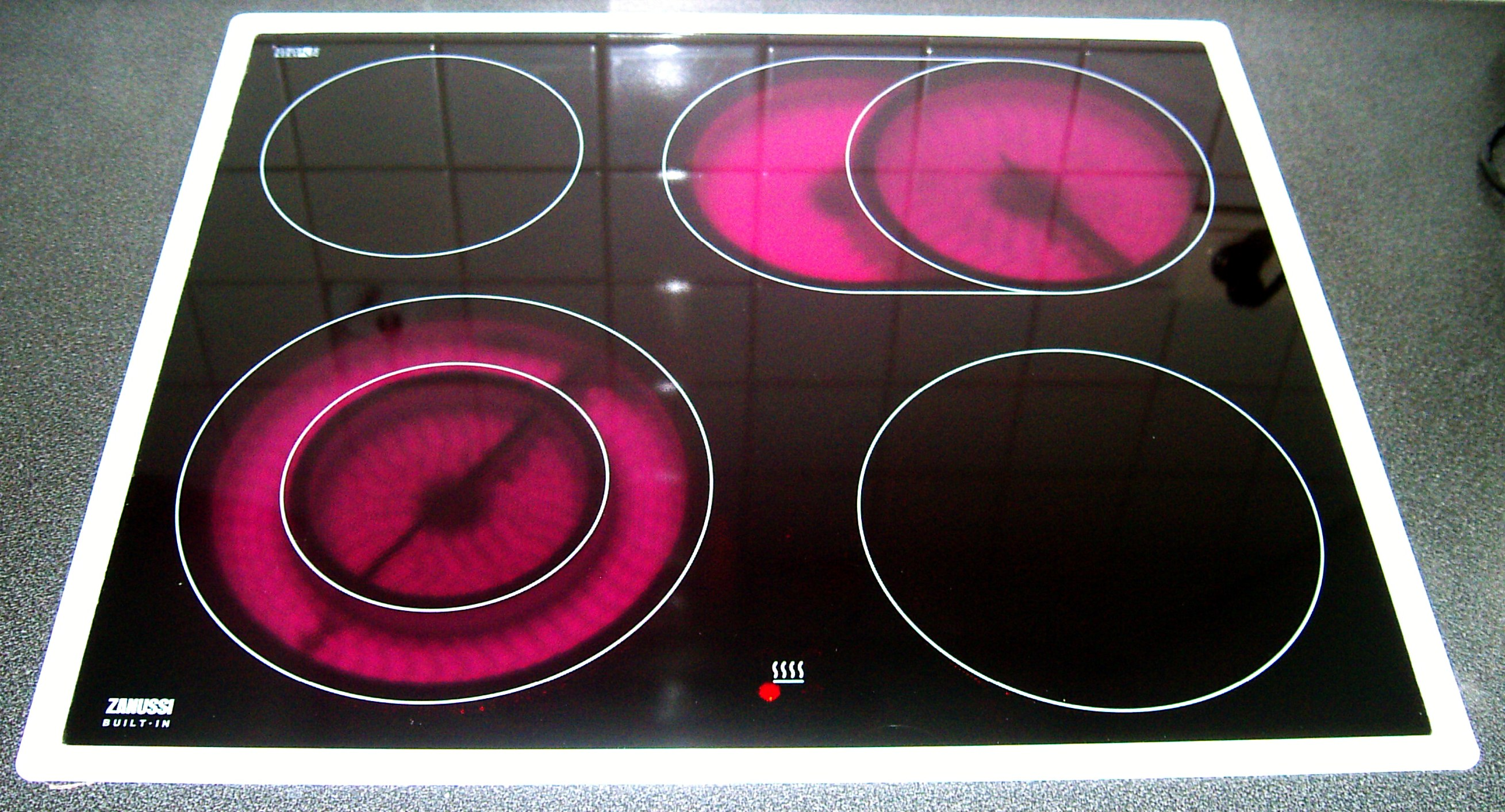
A cooktop is called a hob in modern British English.

== See also ==
- Hob (disambiguation)
- Buttumak
