= Arthur Hobbs =

Arthur Hobbs may refer to:

- Arthur Hobbs (WFA), first secretary of the WFA in 1969
- Arthur Hobbs (gridiron football) (born 1989)
- Arthur Hobbs (mathematician) (born 1940)
- Arthur Hobbs (How I Met Your Mother), a fictional character from How I Met Your Mother
