= Jack Hobbs (disambiguation) =

Jack Hobbs (1882–1963) was an English cricketer.

Jack Hobbs may also refer to:

- Jack Hobbs (actor) (1893–1968), British actor
- John Hobbs (baseball) or Jack Hobbs (born 1956), American baseball player
- Jack Hobbs (footballer) (born 1988), English footballer
- Jack Hobbs (horse) (foaled 2012), a British racehorse

== See also ==
- John Hobbs (disambiguation)
