= Frederick Hobbs =

Frederick Hobbs may refer to:

- Fred Hobbs (mayor) (1841–1920), mayor of Christchurch, New Zealand
- Fred R. Hobbs (1947–2010), American businessman politician, member of the Tennessee House of Representatives
- Fred Hobbs (rugby union) (1920–1985), New Zealand rugby union international
- Frederick Hobbs (Pennsylvania politician) (1934–2005), American politician, member of the Pennsylvania State Senate
- Frederick Hobbs (singer) (1874–1942), New Zealand-born singer, actor and theatre manager
- Fredric Hobbs (1931–2018), American artist and filmmaker
