= Michael Hobbs =

Michael Hobbs may refer to:

- Michael Hobbs (British Army officer) (1937–2026), British Army officer
- Michael Hobbs (rugby union) (born 1987), New Zealand rugby union player
- Michael Hobbs (actor) (born 1965), British actor

== See also ==
- Michael Hobbes, American journalist and podcaster
- Jock Hobbs (Michael James Bowie Hobbs, 1960–2012), New Zealand rugby player
