= List of The Mistmantle Chronicles characters =

The characters from The Mistmantle Chronicles series.

== Main character ==
Urchin
Urchin is a young, honey-colored red squirrel that is orphaned from birth and is not from the island of Mistmantle. His parents were Candle from Whitewings and Almond, originally from Ashfire, but then moved to Whitewings. Urchin looks up to Crispin and becomes his page but after Crispin is sent into exile, he becomes Padra's page, then to Companion to the King after bringing back Crispin from exile and finally a member of The Circle(a superior body of animals, who act as the King's advisors) in book three. In Urchin & the Raven War, Urchin has grown up and is a figure of respect in the circle, when the ravens attack he is sent to defend Curlingshell bay but the ravens manage to take it over anyway and Urchin is captured. But, he is rescued and helps to free Crispin, Cedar, Padra and Catkin who were also captured. He is badly injured at the end of the book and falls into a coma but is woken when given some of Apple's cordial and soon recovers. Corr the Voyager becomes his page. In Urchin & the Rage Tide Urchin becomes a captain and proposes to Sepia at the end of the book.

== Other characters ==
Fir
In his younger days Fir was in the guard, but he was a keen scholar and a deep thinker with a great love for the Heart and a gentle spirit. He soon realized his calling as a priest and has been the priest of Mistmantle for many years now. He limps, due to an old injury, and he has remarkable eyes, deep and joyful. Sometimes people ask for his blessing so they stay safe. He is a happy old priest and lives in his simply furnished turret at the highest point of the Mistmantle tower. He dies in his sleep of old age in book four. The old squirrel has a limp, and his favorite catchphrase is "Hm."
(Urchin of the Riding Stars, Urchin and the Heartstone, The Heir of Mistmantle, Urchin and the Raven War)

Crispin
Crispin is an excellent sword-squirrel, but rarely uses one except for practical purposes like cutting through ivy in the woods. Crispin rose quickly from a young tower squirrel to a member of the Circle, then to a Captain as his qualities of integrity, kindness, courage and resourcefulness were recognized and encouraged. He became king after defeating Husk in Book 1. He returned from exile with both sorrow and glee; sorrow because his lovely wife Whisper was killed by Gloss the mole. He has become the King of Mistmantle and his queen is Cedar, from Whitewings. He leads an army to Swan Isle and is badly injured in the fight. The old wound sustained at Swan Isle badly injures him, leaving his heart damaged. In Book 5, he sacrifices himself to let Sepia, who is trapped beyond the mists, come home to Mistmantle.
(Urchin of the Riding Stars, Urchin and the Heartstone, The Heir of Mistmantle, Urchin and the Raven War, Urchin and the Rage Tide)

Whisper
The squirrel that Crispin met on Swan Isle. She was the only one who was nice to Crispin and befriended him. Later on, she married Crispin. But then, she was slayed by a mole named Gloss. She died in book one. Urchin realizes in book two who Cedar had reminded him of: Whisper. She was quite unlike the chatty, rude squirrels on her island. Crispin gave her his Captain's circlet as a sign of their marriage.

Arran
Arran is an extremely sensible otter, one who sees what needs doing and does it with great efficiency. She reacts to a crisis with commonsense rather than emotion - but she cries when Crispin is exiled, and repeatedly risks her own safety to protect the young. She doesn't like to let Padra know how much she cares about him, because she's not altogether sure of his feelings for her. Whenever anyone says she should ask him to marry her, she just says 'He'd only laugh.' She later marries Padra and becomes a Captain of Mistmantle. She is the mother of Tide and Swanfeather. She is described as being a lighter color, like Urchin, with spiky, tufty fur on the top of her head.
(Urchin of the Riding Stars, Urchin and the Heartstone, The Heir of Mistmantle, Urchin and the Raven War, Urchin and the Rage Tide)

Padra
An otter captain. Padra is Crispin's best friend, and they share the same outlook of life. Padra's presence is reassuring, and if his responsibilities are sometimes heavy, he doesn't let it show. He dislikes injustice, especially towards the young, and can't stay away from the water for long. Padra has a long-term lover, Arran, but hasn't asked her to marry him because he's not convinced that she'll have him. Whenever any one says he should ask her, he just says 'She'd only hit me.' When he does finally ask her she hits him and he laughs, but they do get married and have three children, Tide, Swanfeather, and Fionn.
(Urchin of the Riding Stars, Urchin and the Heartstone, The Heir of Mistmantle, Urchin and the Raven War, Urchin and the Rage Tide)

Hope
His real name is Hoppen, and he's much loved by the animals in charge of the Old Palace nursery. Because he's short-sighted, he's brought up in secret. He has very good manners, adores his mother Thripple, and is a brave little soul determined to get places, even if he bumps into everything in his way. He found the Heartstone in book two. In book one, He is the reason for Husk's death, as Husk was running to the dark prison that had been blessed by Brother Fir, and Hope and Urchin were in the tunnels leading towards it. Hope tried to eat crushed berries, making a blood-like stain on his chest, plus for his short-sightedness, he was wandering around like he was searching for Husk, terrifyingly like Prince Tumble, making Husk flee and fall to his death.
(Urchin of the Riding Stars, Urchin and the Heartstone, The Heir of Mistmantle, Urchin and the Raven War)

Needle
Needle works at the tower, especially on the Threadings - the woven, stitched and painted pictures showing the history of Mistmantle. Needle is a young hedgehog and is fiercely loyal to her friends and family. She is a close friend of Urchin's. Later in book one she is promoted to "Companion to the King" and afterwards, in book three, she is promoted to the Circle.
(Urchin of the Riding Stars, Urchin and the Heartstone, The Heir of Mistmantle, Urchin and the Raven War, Urchin and the Rage Tide)

Lugg
Lugg is an old soldier, graying at the muzzle, who later becomes a Captain of Mistmantle. Like most moles he says little, and what he does say is brief and down-to-earth. He is a good judge of character and a no-nonsense, dependable animal with a dry sense of humor. He dies in book three while attempting to rescue Princess Catkin. He has a wife, Cott, and three daughters, Wing, the mother of Tip and Todd, Wren, who is married, and Moth, a member of the circle and now married to Twigg.
(Urchin of the Riding Stars, Urchin and the Heartstone, The Heir of Mistmantle)

Tay
Tay took an interest in the history of Mistmantle from a very early age, and then turned to a study of the law. She became expert in every aspect of the law and traditions of the island, and felt very strongly that they must always be upheld, however inconvenient. Dignity is important to her, and it is said that nobody has ever seen her laugh. She is very disapproving of silliness and play for an otter. She was held captive in book one after discovering the secret nursery.
(Urchin of the Riding Stars, Urchin and the Heartstone, The Heir of Mistmantle, Urchin and the Raven War)

Fingal
Captain Padra sent his younger brother Fingal to live on a different part of the island, preferring to keep him as far away from Husk as possible. We don't meet him until the ending of the first book, but he comes in a lot more in the next two. He is extremely carefree and talkative, and Urchin quickly realizes why Padra sent him away while Husk was in power. Throughout the second and third book, especially the third book, he matures noticeably, but is still the fun-loving and courageous otter that threw rocks at Husk's army in the first book. He is known for ridding the island of the cause of foul-drought and for his love of his own boat.
(Urchin of the Riding Stars, Urchin and the Heartstone, The Heir of Mistmantle, Urchin and the Raven War)

Crackle
Crackle is a tower squirrel who works at the kitchen. She is determined and tries to do everything herself. She wants to be recognized and praised. She has good-intentions but sometimes is misled. In the first book Crackle was Gleaner's best friend but Gleaner decided that she was too good for Crackle and Crackle desperately tries to become Urchin and Needle's friend.
(Urchin of the Riding Stars, Urchin and the Heartstone, The Heir of Mistmantle, Urchin and the Raven War)

Gleaner
Gleaner was once the squirrel maid in charge of Lady Aspen. Gleaner adores Lady Aspen and refuses to believe she had anything to do with Husk's tyranny. Gleaner cares about Aspen in the afterlife and is always seen bringing things to her grave. She gets very angry with those who talk badly about Aspen and easily jumps to conclusions. She is badly injured by the Silver Prince in book four.
(Urchin of the Riding Stars, Urchin and the Heartstone, The Heir of Mistmantle, Urchin and the Raven War)

Apple
Apple is the foster-mother of Urchin. Apple has a good heart and loves Urchin like a real son. At times she can get overexcited and she loves to chat. She always makes an impression wearing strange hats and making bitter cordial. She marries Filbert in book four.
(Urchin of the Riding Stars, Urchin and the Heartstone, The Heir of Mistmantle, Urchin and the Raven War)

Sepia
Sepia has the most beautiful singing voice on the island. She is in charge of the island choir and is always heard singing on special occasions. She is loving and kind and tries to comfort everyone in need. Sepia also has her "singing cave". She goes there to listen to the sound of her voice. She rescues Catkin in book three and is like an aunt to Catkin. In book four, there is evidence of a budding romance between Sepia and Urchin.
(Urchin of the Riding Stars, Urchin and the Heartstone, The Heir of Mistmantle, Urchin and the Raven War, Urchin and the Rage Tide)

Thripple
Thripple is Hope's mum. She cares about everything and worries about everyone. Thripple looks strange but her kind eyes conceal her strange appearance. She is very protective of her children.
(Urchin of the Riding Stars, Urchin and the Heartstone, The Heir of Mistmantle, Urchin and the Raven War)

Mother Huggen
Mother Huggen is a gentle, sweet and kind hedgehog. She cares about everyone and is kind to everyone she meets. She especially takes care and worries about the young ones. She was in charge of the secret nursery in book one, and was promoted to the Circle.
(Urchin of the Riding Stars, Urchin and the Heartstone, The Heir of Mistmantle, Urchin and the Raven War)

Moth
A maid at the Mistmantle Tower. She is understanding and comforts those in need. She is in charge of the queen and is sometimes seen helping Mother Huggen. She is the daughter of Lugg and marries the carpenter Twigg.
(Urchin of the Riding Stars, Urchin and the Heartstone, The Heir of Mistmantle, Urchin and the Raven War)

Lord Marshall Granite
Granite was originally a captain on Mistmantle and in charge of the armory. Then after the followers of Lord Husk were exiled he went to Whitewings and became Lord Marshall Granite. He liked it on Whitewings because he had his way and he could kill any animal for no big reason. He died in an earthquake on Whitewings after the Fortress collapsed.
(Urchin of the Riding Stars, Urchin and the Heartstone)

Cedar
Cedar is a red squirrel from the island of Whitewings and is an accomplished healer. She is the color of firelight. She was a friend of Urchin's parents and explains his origins to him. Cedar is instrumental in an undercover rescue of Urchin, and accompanies him back to Mistmantle. On Mistmantle she marries Crispin, making her the queen of Mistmantle. She is kind and gentle and mother of Catkin, Oakleaf, and Almondflower. In book two, it is revealed that she was originally, with Almond, from Ashfire, a volcanic island.
(Urchin and the Heartstone, The Heir of Mistmantle, Urchin and the Raven War, Urchin and the Rage Tide)

Scufflen
Scufflen is Needle's baby brother. He was going to be culled due to his curled paw but was rescued by Urchin, Lugg, and Captain Padra.
(Urchin of the Riding Stars, Urchin and the Heartstone, The Heir of Mistmantle, Urchin and the Raven War)

Juniper
Juniper is a novice-priest in training under Brother Fir. He is fostered by Damson and cares very much about her. He is a close friend of Urchin's, but struggles with jealousy of Urchin. He becomes The priest in book four after Fir dies. His real father was Husk.
(Urchin and the Heartstone, The Heir of Mistmantle, Urchin and the Raven War, Urchin and the Rage Tide)

Damson
Damson is the foster-mother of Juniper. She found Juniper in the water one night. She was almost drowned but she saved Juniper just in time. She is well-meaning and independent and hates to get in Juniper's way. She is very proud of Juniper. She dies after being affected by foul-drought. She was a close friend of Apple.
(Urchin and the Heartstone, The Heir of Mistmantle)

Docken
Docken is Thripple's husband and Hope's father. He is very serious about the things he has to do and very loyal to Crispin and Cedar. He, like Thripple, is very protective of his young. He is a Captain in book four but thinks it's only temporary until they find someone better.
(Urchin and the Heartstone, The Heir of Mistmantle, Urchin and the Raven War)

Whittle
Whittle is studying Mistmantle's history and traditions under Tay. Whittle is very serious about his duties. He is very hard-working and tries to do the best he can at everything.
(Urchin and the Heartstone, The Heir of Mistmantle, Urchin and the Raven War)

Scatter
Scatter is another squirrel from the island of Whitewings and is always trying to be helpful. Scatter always wants to feel important. She is a bit childish and loves playing. When Scatter stays on Mistmantle for a while she realizes she doesn't want to go back to Whitewings and asks Crispin if she can stay.
(Urchin and the Heartstone, The Heir of Mistmantle, Urchin and the Raven War)

Tide
Tide is the son of Arran and Padra. He is more sensible than Swanfeather and is more quiet and thoughtful and takes more from Arran and her personality.
(Urchin and the Heartstone, The Heir of Mistmantle, Urchin and the Raven War)

Swanfeather
Swanfeather is the daughter of Arran and Padra. She is more childish of the two otter siblings and has adapted many bad habits from their uncle Fingal.
(Urchin and the Heartstone, The Heir of Mistmantle, Urchin and the Raven War)

Tipp and Todd
Twin mole brothers who love to play and joke around. They are the grandsons of Captain Lugg. They have a hard time taking anything seriously and love action and adventure. Twigg is always happy to make them new toys out of wood.
(Urchin and the Heartstone, The Heir of Mistmantle, Urchin and the Raven War)

Arcneck
Lord Arcneck is the lord of Swan Isle. He was very temperamental towards Crispin and called him a 'Tree Rat'. He and Lady Arcneck carried Urchin and Crispin home to Mistmantle. In book four, he seeks help from Mistmantle in his War against the ravens. He is the father of Prince Crown.
(Urchin of the Riding Stars, Urchin and the Raven War)

Larch
Larch is from Whitewings. Larch is the rightful Queen of Whitewings but had to go into hiding after King Silverbirch took power. She is restored to power when Silverbirch is defeated. In book four, she comes to the aid of Mistmantle against the ravens.
(Urchin and the Heartstone, Urchin and the Raven War)

Quill
A young hedgehog who hangs around Hobb and Yarrow. He listens to them talk about Crispen and Cedar but has different opinions than them, though he is afraid to speak as they are older than he is.
(The Heir of Mistmantle, Urchin and the Raven War)

Catkin
The Heir of Mistmantle and daughter of Crispin and Cedar. She was kidnapped by Linty leaving others to believe there is a curse on the Heir of Mistmantle. In book four, she is captured by ravens and nearly drowns. She is described as strong-willed and bossy, but she desperately desires to be a good princess.
(The Heir of Mistmantle, Urchin and the Raven War)

=== From 'Urchin of the Riding Stars' ===
Husk
As a young squirrel, Husk had many great qualities - he was strong, brave, resourceful and clever. But he was too much aware of all this, and too ready to consider himself superior to other animals. He wanted to impress, and learned to conceal anything in himself which would meet with disapproval. He tried to take over Mistmantle by killing Prince Tumble, and seeing to Queen Spindle's death as well (through Aspen and Gleaner; Gleaner thought she was giving the Queen medicine, but it was poison) and framing Crispin for Prince Tumble's murder. Later, he falls off a sort of cliff in the dark ancient dungeon and dies. Some animals think they see him in book three, but it is only Juniper. When he was younger, he reasoned that his weak brother was a drain on society, and murdered him by pushing him off of a cliff. He was responsible for the death of Juniper's real mother and attempted to kill Juniper (his son) in order to avoid political complications. He married Aspen.

Aspen
Aspen was the eldest of three sisters - the younger ones both married 'off the island', leaving Mistmantle for ever. She realized early in life that she had beauty, intelligence, and charm, and was determined to use these to the greatest advantage. She marries Lord Husk. She fell out of a window with the king and died. Gleaner was her personal maid and is still convinced that Aspen was good and sweet. Aspen most probably poisoned the Queen, as she refuses to talk to Husk about it, and the "special medicine" that was only for the Queen was given to her by Gleaner after she fell. Gleaner said "She didn't want it, her being all honorable, but I gave it to her and it didn't help!"

Gloss
Gloss is a mole from Mistmantle. He is one of Husk and Aspen's supporters; he is killed by Lord Arcneck in the first book after murdering Whisper (thinking Whisper was Crispin because she wore his circlet) and attacking Crispin.

King Brushen
The hedgehog King of Mistmantle, was under heavy influence from Husk. He died when he fell out a window with Aspen.

Queen Spindle
The hedgehog queen of Mistmantle. She died from grief when her son was murdered.

Prince Tumble
The prince of Mistmantle. Husk stabbed him in the night and killed him. He continued to haunt his dreams, until Husk died, convinced that Prince Tumble (who was really Hope) was looking for him.

=== From 'Urchin and the Heartstone' ===
King Silverbirch
King Silverbirch is a tall, thin, long-clawed hedgehog who is the communist-like ruler of the isle of Whitewings. He was regent of Whitewings while his niece, Larch, was still young. He then took over. He is crazed about silver.

Smokewreath
Smokewreath is Silverbirch's sorcerer. He is a red squirrel. He is one of the main reasons that Silverbirch is in control of Whitewings. He uses the bodies of animals to create magic to find silver for King Silverbirch. He often senses beings of similar power and says that he needs them for his magic in order to kill them.

Lord Treeth
Lord Treeth goes to Mistmantle to try and convince Urchin to go to Whitewings but later gets caught and becomes a prisoner on Mistmantle.

Bronze
Bronze is a young hedgehog captain of sorts. He was on the ship that captured Urchin and took him to Whitewings. Like many hedgehogs he believes that hedgehogs are better than otters, moles, and squirrels. He was murdered by the spy Creeper.

Creeper
Creeper is a very small, dark-furred hedgehog. He came to Mistmantle with Lord Treeth in a sea chest, then snuck back to Whitewings and warned the King that moles were going to attack. He is a very silent spy that can creep up upon anybody.

Flame
Flame used to be the priest of Whitewings before King Silverbirch ruled. He was trained by Brother Candle. Flame went into hiding with Larch.

=== From 'The Heir of Mistmantle' ===
Hobb
Hobb is a rude and an untrusting mole. He doesn't believe in the newly appointed royal family of Crispin and Cedar. He has his own ideas on how Mistmantle should be run and acts upon this persistently.

Yarrow
Yarrow is a squirrel. He is a friend of Hobb and the uncle of Gleaner. He shares the same ideas as Hobb does and greatly dislikes the queen.

Hammily
Hammily is Yarrow's wife. She is greatly concerned about Yarrow even when she doesn't understand his actions. She is very-down to earth and polite.

Linty
A psychologically damaged squirrel. She had 2 children and both were sent away to be culled. This causes her to be very cautious and kidnap Catkin believing she is in danger of Husk. She later deludes herself into thinking that Catkin is one of her former children, Daisy, and attempts to leave Mistmantle with her, fearing that "Daisy" will die if she is returned to her family.

=== From 'Urchin and the Raven War' ===
Myrtle
A young apprentice hedgehog working on the Threadings. Sews prophetic pictures into the Threadings without knowing she's doing it.

Oakleaf
The prince, Crispin and Cedar's second child. Very like Crispin.

Almondflower
Catkin and Oakleaf's little sister.

Crown
Lord and Lady Arcneck's son, the swan prince.

Pitter
A young female squirrel from Swan Isle. Brought Mendingmoss to Mistmantle. She protects the 'princess's grave' fiercely, which is really Whisper's grave that Crispin made.

Corr
A young otter, the Voyager. Urchin's first page. Lives in a large family.

Filbert
A squirrel. Likes Apple's cordial; he says it's how his mother used to make cordial. Marries Apple in book 4.

Grith
Gloss's brother. He betrays Urchin and Catkin to the ravens, trying to avenge his brother's death, but is killed by ravens.

Archraven
The king raven who leads the other ravens in their attack on Swan Isle. He is killed by Crispin in battle on Swan Isle, but badly injures Crispin.

Silver Prince
Archraven's son. He is the ravens' justification for attack on Swan Isle. He has gray feathers that only look silver in the sunlight, hence his name. He is very cocky, yet foolish.

Taloness
Archraven's sister. She leads the attack on Mistmantle to avenge her brother whom Crispin killed. She is killed by her nephew, the Silver Prince, who leads a revolt against her.
