= William G. Hobbs =

British painter

William George Hobbs
- A self-portrait of William Hobbs
- Born: 16 May 1927; Alderney, Channel Islands
- Died: 29 September 2012 (aged 85); Brandon, Manitoba, Canada
- Education: Duke of York's Royal Military School, Dover, Kent, Devonport High School,(Evacuated to Penzance from Plymouth), West of England Academy of Art; Bristol University; University of Saskatchewan. Pan American University, Banff School of Fine Arts,
- Occupations: Physician, surgeon, and artist
- Parent(s): Frederick Walter Haydn Hobbs, Anna Helena Hobbs(nee Froseler)

William George Reginald Hobbs (16 May 1927 – 29 September 2012) was an Alderney-born Canadian artist.

== Early life ==
His family moved around considerably due to his father's career in the British Army. The family eventually settled in his fathers home town of Plymouth in the county of Devon. During the Second World War, William along with his three brothers Frederick, John and Dennis were evacuated from blitz-torn Plymouth to Penzance. Just after Victory in Europe, but still during World War II, William did his military service and received a scholarship to study medicine. He went to Bristol University where he also realized and developed a talent for art. His sketches and paintings were admired by art teachers at the university who advised him to study art rather than medicine. Nonetheless, William Hobbs graduated from Bristol with a degree as a general practitioner in medicine. He then joined the Royal Navy in the tradition of his family and became a ship's surgeon in 1950.

== Emigration ==
One of William's Paintings of Gainsborough titled 40 Below Zero.

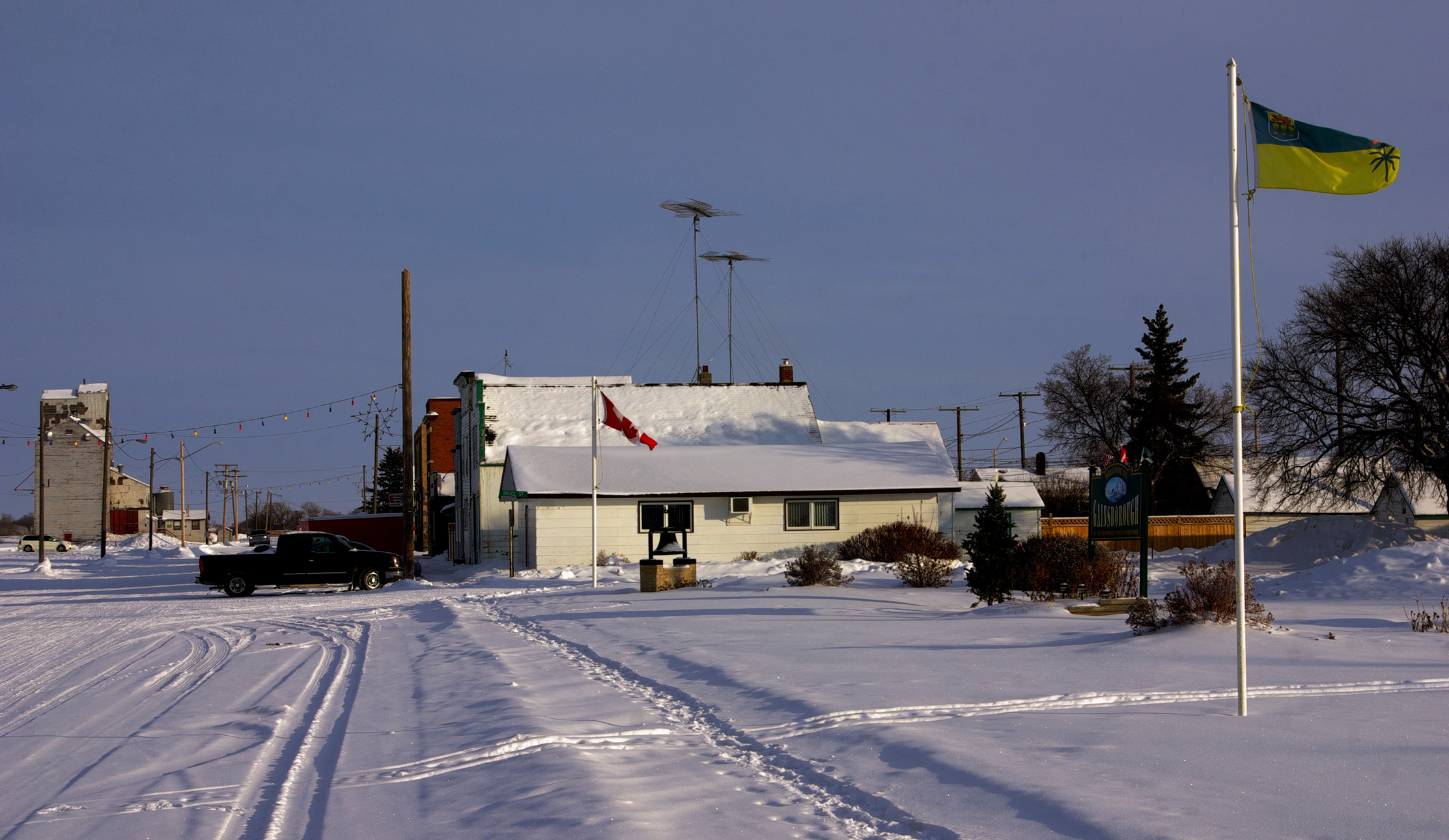
2011 image taken from same view point as 40 Below Zero. The former building block was levelled and is now Bennet Park. A town sign located there incorporates the painting in its design.

William Hobbs emigrated to Canada in 1959. In Canada he began a career as a physician and surgeon in the village Gainsborough, Saskatchewan and became a respected physician in the southeast Saskatchewan and southwestern Manitoba area. Notwithstanding the considerable demands in time alone imposed upon him by his role in this rural community, he managed to develop a technical skill in painting which won him first prize in a major Canadian art show in 1978. William Hobbs also attended courses at the Pan American University, Banff School of Fine Arts, and the Emma Lake Campus at the University of Saskatchewan.

== Artist ==
He took the first place at the Fifth Texas International Art Show in 1976 and second place at the seventh in 1978. He has been honoured with a number of one-man shows, as well as having his work selected for showing at the International Grand Prix of contemporary Art in Monte Carlo. His work was on exhibit at the winter garden pavilion in December 1978, under the high patronage of the Sovereign Prince and Princess of Monaco. Much of Hobbs's work reflects the influence his immigration had on him, as is portrayed in a series consisting of six major works on that subject. His work is in many North American and European collections and also in those of Mitsubishi Ltd., Marubeni Ltd. and Tohoku Electric Power of Japan, and other collections internationally.

He served as Mayor of Gainsborough, Saskatchewan in the 1970s. During his term as Mayor, he was instrumental in having a swimming pool built.

== Where's Rembrandt ==
There's a little Rembrandt in paintings by William Hobbs, and fans and spectators always look for in his work. Rembrandt is the nickname of the little Jack Russell Terrier that often appears in Williams railway paintings. It's a nod to the master Rembrandt, who placed a similar dog, darkly lit, in his most famous painting, The Night Watch. But in Hobbs's paintings, the dog doesn't scurry around musketeers in plumed hats and sashed waists but around old steam engine trains and train stations.

== Personal life ==
Hobbs was the second eldest of four brothers. The third eldest was John Raymond Hobbs (1929–2008), a professor of chemical immunology.

William Hobbs died in September 2012 at the age of 85.
