= Keith Hobbs =

Keith Hobbs may refer to:

- Keith Hobbs (footballer), association football player from New Zealand
- Keith Hobbs (politician) (born 1952), politician in Canada
- Keith Hobbs (priest) (1925–2001), Archdeacon of Chichester
