= Sarah Hobbie =

American ecologist

Academic background
- Education: Carleton College; University of California, Berkeley

Academic work
- Discipline: ecology
- Sub-discipline: ecosystem ecology
- Institutions: University of Minnesota
- Main interests: nutrient cycling
- Website: https://experts.umn.edu/en/persons/sarah-e-hobbie

Sarah E. Hobbie is an American ecologist, currently at the University of Minnesota, a National Academy of Sciences Fellow for Ecology, Evolution and Behavior in 2014 and a formerly Minnesota McKnight Land-Grant Professor.

Hobbie is an ecosystem ecologist, known for her studies of terrestrial carbon and nutrient cycling in ecosystems ranging from tundra to cities.

== Biography ==
Sarah grew up in St. Paul, Minnesota. She graduated from Carleton College in 1986 with a degree in biology and earned her Ph.D. in 1995 from the University of California, Berkeley. While a graduate student, she received the Murray Buell Award for excellence, the award recognized her research on the effect of increased temperature in Alaskan tundra on net ecosystem CO_{2} uptake. After her Ph.D., she was a post-doctoral fellow at Stanford University.

In 1998, she joined the faculty of the Ecology, Evolution and Behavior program at the University of Minnesota, where she is a Resident Fellow of the University of Minnesota's Institute on the Environment and is involved in undergraduate writing across the curriculum programming and in graduate education leadership.

Hobbie's research addresses the influence of human activities on terrestrial ecosystems. She explores the influence of changes in atmospheric composition and climate on ecosystem processes, the effects of urbanization and suburbanization on biogeochemical cycles, and the influence of plants on biogeochemical processes. Hobbie is particularly interested on global change, and she aims to understand how anthropogenic effects affect the carbon cycle; how biodiversity, atmospheric carbon dioxide, nitrogen, rainfall, and increases in temperatures influence grassland ecosystems; and how increases in temperature alter community and ecosystem processes at the southern boreal-temperate forest ecotone. In the area of urban ecology, Hobbie studies the effects of urban and suburban development on biogeochemical cycling. Her and her team focus on quantifying resources of nutrient pollutants to subwatersheds of the Mississippi River and how nutrients move from the land to the stormwater

She is active in the National Science Foundation's Long Term Ecological Research program (LTER), with ongoing research at the Cedar Creek LTER site in central Minnesota. She has served on the LTER Executive Board, on the National Center for Ecological Analysis and Synthesis Science Advisory Board, on NSF review panels, and contributed to a report for the Minnesota State Legislature evaluating the potential for the State’s terrestrial ecosystems to sequester carbon.

She was elected Fellow of the Ecological Society of America in 2015.

== Publications ==
- Pets, lawn fertilizer pose big threats to Mississippi River in Twin Cities
- What pollutes the urban Mississippi? Lawns, dogs and lots of pavement runoff
