= Mary Hobbs =

Mary Hobbs may refer to:

- Mary Anne Hobbs (born 1964), English DJ and music journalist
- Mary Mendenhall Hobbs (1852–1930), American Quaker advocate for women's education, temperance and suffrage
