= John Raymond Hobbs =

British surgeon

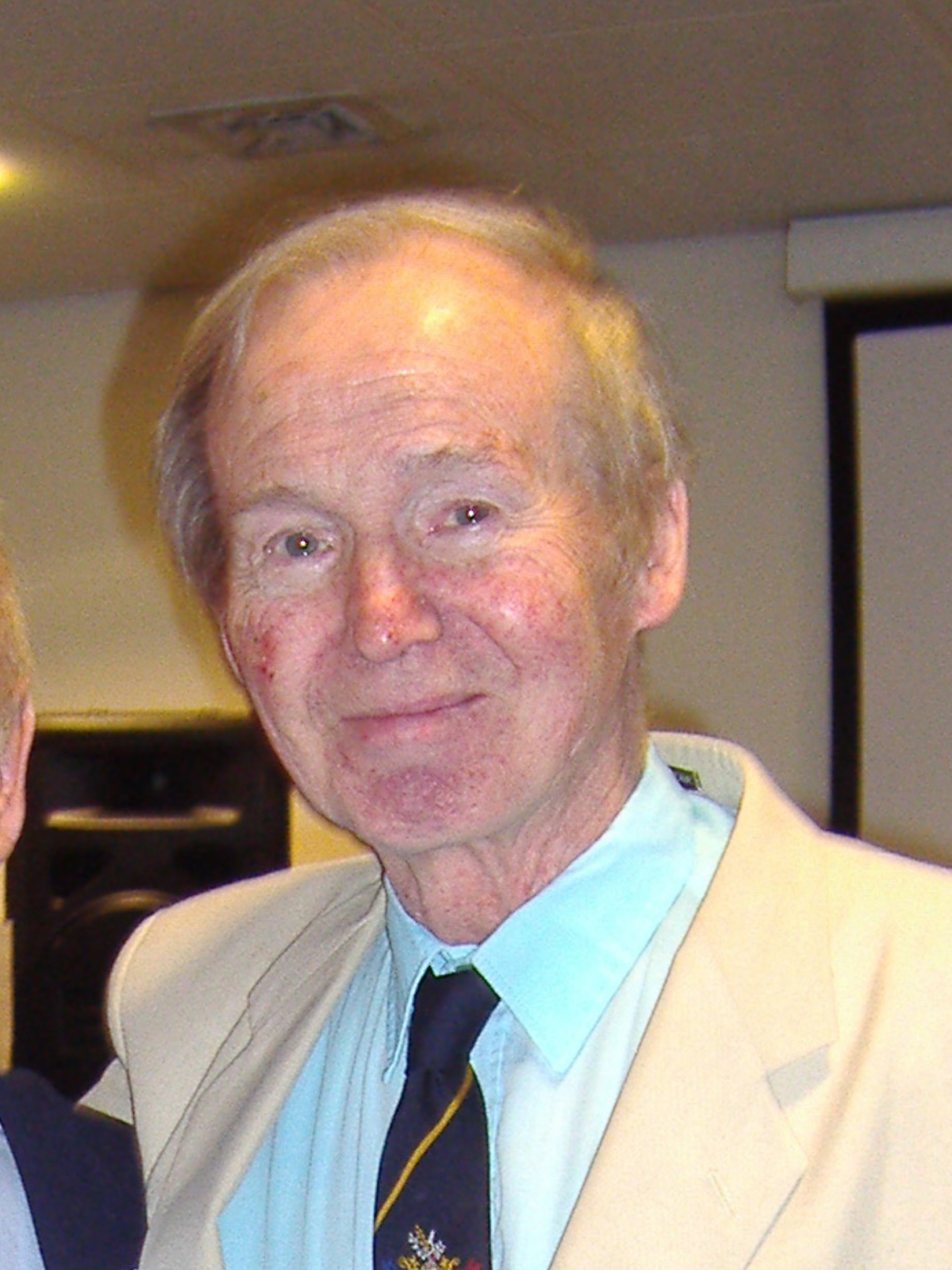
- Professor John Hobbs
- Born: 17 April 1929; Aldershot, Hampshire, England
- Died: 13 July 2008 (aged 79); Uxbridge, London, England
- Education: Middlesex Hospital, London
- Occupation: Professor of Chemical Immunology
- Spouse: Patricia Hobbs
- Parent(s): Frederick Walter Haydn Hobbs, Anna Helena Hobbs.

John Raymond Hobbs (17 April 1929 – 13 July 2008) was a professor who was at the forefront of the techniques of clinical immunology, protein biochemistry and bone marrow transplantation, specifically in child health.

== Early life ==
John Hobbs was born in Aldershot. He was the third son of four male children of a soldier's family. His family moved around considerably due to his father's career in the British Army. The family eventually settled in his father's home town of Plymouth in the county of Devon. During the Second World War, John, along with his three brothers Frederick, William and Dennis, were evacuated from blitz-torn Plymouth to Penzance. He left school at 16 and worked as a pathology laboratory assistant and did his National Service in Egypt with the British Army Medical Corps. After National Service, John used the money he had saved from his army sergeant's pay to put himself into Plymouth and Devonport Technical College where he achieved an External Inter.BSc within 9 months, gaining a state scholarship to study medicine, where he chose the Middlesex Hospital in London and won 7 prizes. From 1968–1996 Hobbs received 4 national prizes, 15 international awards and 4 honorary fellowships

== Medicine ==
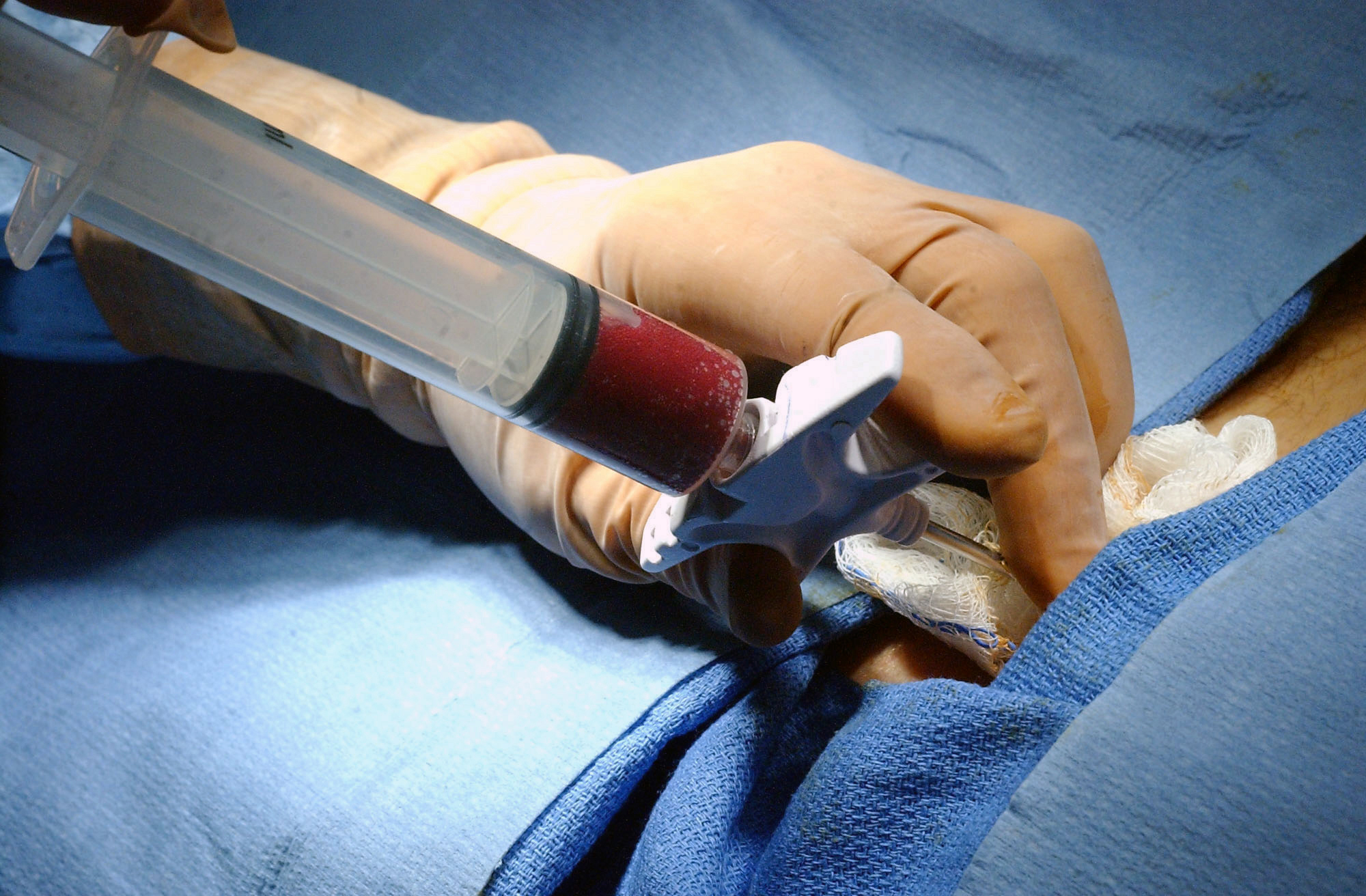
Bone marrow harvest

He specialised in Pathology and in 1963 was appointed consultant at Hammersmith Hospital, London. In 1970 he was appointed as Professor of Chemical Pathology at Westminster Medical School. In the early 1970s Professor Hobbs's Westminster team were doing ground breaking work. In 1970 the world's first successful intended stem cell transplant for a previously fatal human disease. In 1971 the first British Bone Marrow Transplant using bone marrow from a matching sibling. In the following year a transplant was successful using the bone marrow from father to son. In April 1973 Hobbs and his team were able to achieve the world's first bone marrow transplant using a matched but unrelated volunteer donor. With the success of this procedure steps were taken by professor Hobbs's team to set up the world's first unrelated bone marrow donor register. The tissue typing specialist of the team, David James, was instrumental in the setting up and the administration of this ground breaking register which was later named after Anthony Nolan. It established the future use of unrelated donors to patients, so far for over 10,000 people. This initiative was the blue print which would be copied around the world. The Westminster team completed 285 transplants before it and its specialist unit's sudden, unexpected, enforced closure, effectively in autumn of 1992. Tragically, this left a waiting list of children with virtually nowhere else in Britain to go for treatment of their genetic diseases and inborn errors. However, Hobbs had founded the COrrection of GEnetic diseases by Transplantation or COGENT movement, with a charitable trust which attracted £13 million 1971–2007. The remaining balance, with the assistance of the late Professor Anthony Oakhill, was used to create a new unit at the Royal Hospital for Sick Children in the city of Bristol, and so allowing work to be continued. It is now headed by Colin Steward. As for the children who were treated by Hobbs's bone marrow team at the Westminster hospital, most of these children now enjoy full lives as adults.

== Passing on his Knowledge ==
Hobbs became an enthusiastic and accomplished teacher and accepted invitations to lecture (over 30 endowed) in 58 different countries (in over half of Europe's medical schools, 25 in the US and over 30 of the Commonwealth universities). He was given the status of visiting professor on over 25 occasions and he contributed to many international meetings and committees. He was re-invited many times and Presidential status was awarded to him in 5 different scientific meetings. He acted as an advisor to Health Ministers in Russia, Poland, Uruguay, Hong Kong, China and Peru.

Throughout 30 years as a recognised teacher Hobbs encouraged his juniors. 134 university higher degrees were achieved by trainees for work completed within the departments he headed; 48 full university chairs have been awarded to such staff; 70 have become members or fellows of the royal College of Pathologists (including 18 non-medical); 12 scientific staff were helped to medical degrees; together with 42 students contemporary with his daughters.

== Achievements ==
- In Protein biochemistry – proved females treated for iron deficiency achieved the male normal range for haemoglobin blood levels; the preexisting 'normal' ranges for females were no longer acceptable.
- From monitoring the Myeloma Trials, the first to describe the natural history of myelomatosis and helped in 1971 to set up the Protein Reference Units which save the national health service £3 million each year. Hobbs retired as PRU chairman in 1994.
- Established the first non-invasive screening test of the newborn to detect those affected by cystic fibrosis 1968
- As Chairman of the Expert Panel on Proteins of the International Federation of Clinical Chemists (1971–1979) created International standards for many serum proteins.
- Developed successful uses of human tumour markers
- In Clinical Immunology,
- Standardised methods and reagents (some for WHO) to provide normal ranges from 12 weeks gestation to old age for caucasian populations
- Immunoglobolin levels.
- Responses to candida albicans.
- Complement activation.
- Mixed lymphocyte reaction T-cell receptors.
- Phagocyte function.
- First to fully describe IgA deficiency.
- IgM deficiency selective deficiency to staphylococci.
- Early to recognise a circulating subset of T-cells co-optable through Fc-receptors to become killer cells.
- Defined secondary deficiencies of B-cells> and T-cells and their possible treatments predictable by cytofluorometry
- In Bone Marrow Transplantation he had been taught at Registrar level, by the late Joseph Humble at Westminster Hospital in 1959–61 and was a volunteer donor of 500 ml of his own bone marrow (under anaesthesia) to be used for research purposes. When he returned in 1970 as head of chemical Pathology and Immunology he created the Westminster Children's Bone Marrow Team and lead it until 1992 in its pioneering work to treat 133 children with otherwise fatal genetic diseases. The team became so skilled that, of their last 56 transplants from matched family donors, all survived for over 100 days (a criterion for safety of the procedure). From matched unrelated donors 91% survived over 100 days. By 1992 these results were probably among the best in the world. The improvements in bone marrow transplantation introduced by Westminster have been published
- In Current Contents 1972, Hobbs was one of 11 British medical doctors included in a list of 'The World's top 1,000 scientists'.

== Family ==
John Raymond Hobbs was third eldest of four brothers. He was also the father of three daughters and eight grandchildren.

== Publications (some of 630) ==
7. Hobbs J.R., Bayliss, R.I.S., MacLagan, N.F. The routine use of 132-I in the diagnosis of thyroid disease (1963) Lancet, i, 8–13. (M.D. Thesis, London)

Hobbs, J. R. Displacement bone marrow transplantation and immunoprophylaxis for genetic diseases.Adv. Intern. Med. 33 (1987) 81–118

126 Valdimarrson, J.H., Higgs, J.M., Wells, R.S., Yamamura, M, Hobbs, J.R., Holt, P.J. Immune abnormalities associated with chronic mucocutaneous candidiasis, (1973) Cell Immunol. 6, 348–61

144 Ezeoke, A., Ferguson, N, Fakhri, O, Hekkens, W and Hobbs, J.R. Antibodies in the sera of celiac patients which can co-opt K-cells to attack gluten-labelled targets (1974) in W Hekkens, A.S. Pena (eds) Coeliac Disease, Stenfert Kroese/Leiden, pp 176–188

174 Hobbs, J.R., Barrett, A, de Souza, I., Morgan, L., Raggatt, P., Salih, H., Selection of anti-hormonal therapy of some cancers (1975) in D Minzuni et al. (eds) Host Defense Against Cancer and Its Potentiation, Univ of Tokyo Press, Tokyo/Univ. Park Press/Baltimore, pp 451–6

204 Hobbs J.R., Encouragement from research on the cancer of the individual patient (1977) in R.W. Raven, Outlook on Cancer, Plenum/London, pp 147–162

319 Hobbs J.R., AIDS (1984) letter B.J. Hosp. Med. 32:51

448 Hobbs J.R., The use of volunteer unrelated donors in J R Hobbs (ed) Correction of certain genetic diseases by transplantation, 1989, COGENT/London 1989: 147–158

484 Henderson D.C., Sheldon J., Riches P.G., Hobbs J.R. Cytokine induction of neopterin production, Clin Exp Immunol 1991; 83: 479–482

497 Wang Q., Rowbottom A., Riches P.G., Dadian G., Hobbs J.R. Combined detection of phenotype and Y chromosome by immunoenzymelabelling and in situ hybridisation on peripheral lymphocytes, J Immunol Methods 1991; 139: 251–5

547 Hobbs J.R., Wang Q., Henderson D.C., Downie C., Obaro S., Busulphan-cyclophosphamide induction used twice with 9/12 successes in the second bone-marrow transplant, COGENT 1992; 2: 127–135

630 Hobbs J.R., Further aspects of human immunoglobulin A deficiency, Ann Clin Biochem 2007; 44: 496–7

== See also ==
- His brother, Canadian artist William G. Hobbs.
