= Colin Hobbs =

Australian rules footballer

Personal information
- Full name: Colin Ralph Hobbs
- Born: 28 May 1946 (age 80)
- Original team: Fitzroy Under 19's
- Height: 182 cm (6 ft 0 in)
- Weight: 73 kg (161 lb)

Playing career^{1}
Years	Club	Games (Goals)
1966–71	Fitzroy	64 (6)
- ^{1} Playing statistics correct to the end of 1971.

Colin Hobbs (born 28 May 1946) is a former Australian rules footballer who played with Fitzroy in the Victorian Football League (VFL).
