= Thomas Hobbs =

Thomas Hobbs may refer to:

- Thomas Hobbes or Hobbs (1588–1679), English philosopher
- Thomas Saunders Hobbs (1856–1927), English-born Ontario merchant and politician
- Thomas Hobbs (MP), Member of Parliament for Weymouth in 1555; see Weymouth and Melcombe Regis
- Thomas Hobbs, actor in Prince Charles's Men and the King's Men, the latter from 1626 to 1637
- Thomas Hobbs (priest) (died 1509), Dean of Windsor

== See also ==
- Thomas Hobbes (priest), Dean of Exeter
- Thomas Hobbs Jr. House, on the National Register of Historic Places listings in York County, Maine
