= David Hobbs =

David Hobbs may refer to:

- David Hobbs (basketball) (born 1949), American basketball coach
- David Hobbs (racing driver) (born 1939), British former racing driver
- David Hobbs (rugby league) (born 1958), rugby league player
- David Hobbs (administrator), Secretary General of the NATO Parliamentary Assembly
