= John Hobbs (cricketer, born 1935) =

English cricketer

Personal information
- Full name: John Anthony David Hobbs
- Born: 30 November 1935; Aigburth, Lancashire, England
- Died: 21 June 2021 (aged 85); Stamford, Lincolnshire, England
- Batting: Right-handed

Domestic team information
- Years: Team
- 1956–1958: Oxford University

Career statistics
| Competition | First-class |
|---|---|
| Matches | 18 |
| Runs scored | 614 |
| Batting average | 17.54 |
| 100s/50s | 0/3 |
| Top score | 95 |
| Catches/stumpings | 18/– |
- Source: Cricinfo, 13 May 2020

John Anthony David Hobbs (30 November 1935 – 21 June 2021) was an English first-class cricketer.

Hobbs was born in the Liverpool suburb of Aigburth in November 1935. He later studied at St Peter's College at the University of Oxford. While studying at Oxford, he played first-class cricket for Oxford University, making his debut against Gloucestershire at Oxford in 1956. He played first-class cricket for Oxford until 1958, making a total of eighteen appearances. Hobbs scored a total of 614 runs in his eighteen matches, at an average of 17.54. He passed fifty on three occasions, with a high score of 95 against Middlesex in 1975.
