= Hobs Reprographics =

UK printing and document services company

Hobs Group
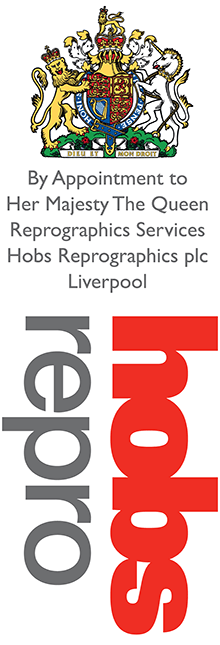
- Type: Limited Company
- Industry: Business Services
- Founded: July 1969; 57 years ago Liverpool, UK
- Area served: UK
- Key people: Steve Hill (Chairman); Craig Horwood (MD)
- Services: Document services, 3D printing and visualisation, "Bringing client's information and ideas to life"
- Website: www.hobs.com

Hobs Reprographics established in Liverpool in 1969 is a printing and document services company. It provides printing, design and scanning services, aimed at creative, professional and construction sectors.

Hobs has 24 branches across the country with over 300 employees. Hobs employs its own fleet of couriers, which offers quick services to construction project sites or secure services to professional and financial services clients.

Hobs carries the Queen's royal warrant, for services provided to the royal household.

== History of Hobs ==
Hobs was founded in Liverpool in 1969 when Kieran O'Brien perceived a gap in the market for a local drawing office that also offered a collection and delivery service and somewhere for clients and students to discuss their printing needs and get advice on the best way to produce their work. Kieran presented his ideas and business plan to JD Hackett, an Irish Reprographics company established in Dublin in 1954 and immediately secured their backing and investment. The two joined forces to establish Hobs which stands for Hackett and O'Brien.

The Liverpool Echo reported that Hobs were famous in the 1960s for their fleet of "Hobs girls" or the "Mini Girls". The Mini Girls were the team of couriers employed by Hobs, so called because of the cars they drove, or as some would suggest because of the mini skirts they wore, popular in the 60s. An all girl drivers fleet was seen as quite revolutionary for the time and Hobs were considered to be an early support of equality in the workforce. Liverpool Echo, May 1, 2006

=== 1980s ===
In 1982 Hobs Manchester opened on Kennedy Street comprising a branch manager, two printers and a delivery girl. In 1983, Hobs bought-out CT Reprographics Ltd on Deansgate and moved its operations from Kennedy Street to CT Reprographics existing building. The staff doubled in size overnight. Hobs dropped its name in favour of the already well established CT Reprographics Ltd brand. The same year CT Reprographics was the first company in the UK to purchase the advanced Xerox 2080 printer which became a welcomed addition to the two dyeline printing machines. Because of the size of the Xerox 2080, Kieran O'Brien had to seek new premises on Deansgate to house this machine. In 1987, bigger premises became available on Deansgate, so CT Reprographics and the Xerox 2080 were both co-located in the new building, and the CT Reprographics brand reverted to Hobs Manchester.

=== 1990s ===
In 1991 a presence in Birmingham was established with the acquisition of SFS Strada Ltd. This was followed the next year by the acquisitions of Scot Barker in 1992 and Cross Repro in 1997, both in Glasgow. In 1998 the business to a big step forward with the acquisition of multiple sites from Océ. In 1998 Hobs was granted a Royal Warrant of Appointment (United Kingdom) for services to the Royal Household which it retains to this day. Hobs On-Site was launched in 1999 to provide onsite reprographics and mail room services.

=== 2000s ===
In 2004 Hobs Legal Docs was formed, followed by the acquisition of Datalex Legal Docs in 2005. Miller Reprographics was acquired in 2007 in Glasgow, followed by Copyright Reprographics in Birmingham

=== 2010s ===
In 2011 Hobs acquired Thames Print Room in Reading and launched Hobs Exchange to provide bulk scanning and records management services. 2013 saw the acquisition of MPG, Manchester Print Graphics in the Northern Quarter of Manchester. In 2014 Business Growth Fund invested £7M in Hobs. In 2016, shortly after arrival of new CEO, James Duckenfield, Hobs acquired both K2 Legal Services into its legal division, Anexsys as well as Face Creative Services in London. In 2017 Hobs received further investment from BGF of £4m.
In 2018 Hobs divested its On-Site business to the Rigby Group. Later the same year it acquired rival company Call Print. In December 2018 Hobs were the first to invest in two Iridesse 6-colour digital production presses in the UK.

=== 2020s ===
In 2020 Hobs divested its Anexsys, legal services business to Xact Data Discovery and restructured the business and at the same time ceased being a public limited company. James Duckenfield stepped from being CEO to becoming a non-executive director and long standing employee Craig Horwood took over as managing director.
