= Steve Hobbs =

Steve(n) or Stephen Hobbs may refer to:

- Steve Hobbs (Missouri politician), Republican member of the Missouri House of Representatives
- Steve Hobbs (Washington politician) (born 1970), Washington Secretary of State
- Stephen Hobbs (born 1965), American football player
- Steven Hobbs (murderer) (born 1971), American murderer and suspected serial killer
