= Sarah Hobbs =

Artist

- Born: 1970 (age 55–56); Lynchburg, Virginia
- Education: University of Georgia
- Known for: photography
- Website: sarahhobbs.net

Sarah Hobbs (born 1970) is an artist. Hobbs is from Lynchburg, Virginia. She lives and works in Atlanta.

== Education ==
Hobbs received her Bachelor of Fine Arts in art history from the University of Georgia in Athens, Georgia in 1992 and her Master of Fine Arts degree in photography in 2000, also from the University of Georgia.

== Career ==
Hobbs builds psychological, room-scale still lives which engage "apprehension, frustration, confusion, indecision—emotions that trouble the soul" and photographs them as large format color images. Her photos, including those in "Small Problems in Living" (1999–2004), are taken on a 4x5 camera. These scenes are set up in Hobb's home or the homes of close friends; they are made to be dreamlike. Across her career, her photographs and installations are about "perfectionism and its cousins, obsessiveness and overcompensation." Hobbs' interest in human mania has spilled out from just photographs of staged scenes and into gallery installations, which suggest craft tipping over into mania and obsession. Broadly, her work also engages the psycho-social, alienation, irrational fears, little neurosis, and common bonds over shared problems.

"Sarah Hobbs's work explores and gives form to various human behaviors and compulsions. She carefully stages and photographs scenes that are meant to embody phobias, neuroses, and obsessions. Her intricate tableaus are simultaneously profound and witty, reflecting Hobbs's understanding of human psychology." - Katherine A. Bussard, Assistant Curator of Photography at The Art Institute of Chicago.

In 2011, her book Small Problems in Living was published; the book compiles three photographic series. In this project, "apparently familiar and harmless scenes become threatening or overwhelming," like way that a familiar scene could be "perceived by someone suffering from paranoia, obsessive-compulsive disorder, phobias or neurosis." Her work is featured in The Focal Press Companion to the Constructed Image in Contemporary Photography (2019) where it is reviewed as "provoking contemplation, inviting [viewers] to see spaces differently," and her contemporaries in fabricated, place-based constructed photography are listed as Noémie Goudal and Oh Soon-Hwa. Vitamin Ph (2006), another book featuring Hobbs' photographs, likens her images to Woody Allen's post-modern comic manifesto, "I can't express anger. I just grow a tumor instead."

== Exhibits and awards ==
In 2011 Hobbs received an Artadia Award. She was also awarded the Dave Brown Projects: Photography Competition 2015 Grand Prize. In 2017 Hobbs was an award recipient from IDEA Capital as she began to move into video work. In 2003 she was a finalist for the Forward Arts Foundation Emerging Artist Award. Hobbs was a Hudgens Prize finalist in 2017.

Hobbs' work has been exhibited widely and is held in notable public collections including at the Art Institute of Chicago, the Brooklyn Museum, the Los Angeles County Museum of Art, and the Museum of Contemporary Photography.

=== Selected exhibitions ===
- 2021 "Underexposed: Women Photographers from the Collection," High Museum of Art, Atlanta, Georgia
- 2020 Photography and Narrative, High Museum of Art, Atlanta, Georgia
- 2019 "Louder Than Words," Zuckerman Museum of Art, Kennesaw State University, Kennesaw, Georgia
- 2019 "Twilight Living," Hathaway Contemporary Gallery, Atlanta, Georgia (solo)
- 2017 Sarah Hobbs: Psychological Traces, Indianapolis Museum of Contemporary Art, Indianapolis, Indiana (solo)
- 2017 A Handful of Dust, in collaboration with Hannah Israel, Whitespace Gallery, Atlanta, Georgia
- 2016 What is Near: Reflections on Home, High Museum of Art, Atlanta, Georgia
- 2016 Somewhere in the Balance, Houston Center for Photography, Houston, Texas
- 2016 "Interior States," Pinnacle Gallery, Savannah College of Art and Design, Savannah, Georgia (solo)
- 2015 ArtLab: Sarah Hobbs: It Started as an Experiment, Seaboard Studios, Columbus State University, Columbus, Georgia (solo)
- 2015 "Flight in Place" (an installation in the home of writer Carson McCullers), Carson McCullers Center for Writers and Musicians, Columbus, Georgia (artist-in-residence) (solo)
- 2013 Looking Forward: Gifts of Contemporary Art from the Patricia A. Bell Collection, Montclair Art Museum, Montclair, New Jersey
- 2012 "Contents: Love, Anxiety, Happiness and Everything Else," Photolucida's Critical Mass 2011, at Photo Center NW, Seattle, Washington; Newspace Center for Photography, Portland, Oregon; and Rayko Photo Center, San Francisco, California
- 2011 "Sarah Hobbs: Out of Mind," Silver Eye Center for Photography, Pittsburgh, Pennsylvania (solo)
- 2008–2010 "Slightly Unbalanced," with work from Sophie Calle, Mike Kelly, Bruce Nauman, Sarah Hobbs, et al., Independent Curators International, Traveling Exhibition
- 2007 "On the Scene: Kota Ezawa, Sarah Hobbs, Angela Strassheim," Art Institute of Chicago, Chicago, Illinois
- 2006 "Sarah Hobbs: Does This Sound Like You?" Solomon Projects, Atlanta, Georgia (solo)
- 2004 Small Problems in Living, Yossi Milo Gallery, New York, New York
