= Arthur Hobbs (mathematician) =

American mathematician

Arthur Marmaduke Hobbs (19 June 1940 – 25 October 2020) was an American mathematician specializing in graph theory. He spent his teaching career at Texas A&M University.

== Early and personal life ==
Arthur Hobbs was born on June 19, 1940, in Washington, D.C. He was the eldest child of his family, having two younger brothers. His father was an engineer and later became an attorney. The family moved in 1941 to Pennsylvania, and again after World War II to South Bend, Indiana, where Arthur Hobbs grew up. He married his wife Barbara in 1964. They were married for 50 years until she died in 2014. They had two daughters, six grandchildren, and one great-granddaughter.

== Education and early career ==
After graduating in 1958 from John Adams High School, Hobbs studied mathematics at the University of Michigan, graduating in 1962. He then served in the US Army in Washington, D.C., for approximately two years, and then from 1965 to 1968 worked for the National Bureau of Standards.

He received his Ph.D. from the University of Waterloo in Ontario, Canada, in 1971. His research focused on Hamiltonian cycles, particularly concentrating in squares and higher powers of graphs, and his thesis adviser was the graph theorist William Thomas Tutte.

== Academic career ==
After receiving his Ph.D., Hobbs began teaching as a mathematics professor at Texas A&M University in 1971, where he worked until his retirement in 2008. He was the faculty senator for twelve years, and also taught various mathematics courses including, but not limited to calculus, combinatorics, discrete mathematics, graph theory, and number theory. Hobbs and his colleague taught a course in the intersection of graph theory and number theory, he explains:

We taught enough of the elements of our specialties that students could read a research paper including elements of both subjects. Then students were asked to select a paper from a list we provided, read it, and report on it to the class. An important aspect of the course was gaining a feeling for the discovery process involved in research. We asked about each idea presented, "Are there questions that are not addressed here? Can these ideas be extended in ways the authors did not discuss?" There was a test on each of number theory and graph theory just after the lectures on that topic, and the grade was based on the results of those tests and on the presentations made. One consequence of this course was a published research paper.

== Research ==
Hobbs' research before entering graduate school was on thickness of graphs. Later, in graduate school and for ten years following, he concentrated on Hamiltonian cycles, particularly in squares and higher powers of graphs. He then spent a couple of years working on the Gyarfas and Lehel conjecture that any family of trees T1; T2; : : : Tn, with 1; 2; : : : ; n vertices respectively, can be packed in an edge-disjoint manner into the complete graph on n vertices. This conjecture is still open. Hobbs also worked with packings of graphs with trees and coverings by trees, which he worked on with several co-authors, including Paul A. Catlin, Jerrold W. Grossman, Lavanya Kannan, and Hong-Jian Lai.

They defined the fractional arboricity of a graph as

$$\gamma(G) = \max_{H \subseteq G} \left({{|E(H)}|\over{|V(H)| - \omega(H)}}\right),$$

where ω(H is the number of components of H and the maximum is taken over all subgraphs H for which the denominator is not zero. They also defined the strength of a graph as

$$\eta(G) = \min_{S \subseteq E(G)} \left( {|S|\over{\omega(G-S)-\omega(G)}}\right),$$

where the maximum is taken over all subsets S of E(G) for which the denominator is not zero. Additionally, they characterized uniformly dense graphs, and have found several classes of uniformly dense graphs and several ways of constructing such graphs.

Hobbs had also done research in matroid theory.

== Publications ==
Dr. Hobbs has 40 publications in graph theory, and in 1989 co-authored the book Elementary Linear Algebra. He also wrote an essay on how to read research papers. A few publications are listed below:

- Hobbs, Arthur M.; Kannan, Lavanya; Lai, Hong-Jian; Lai, Hongyuan; Weng, Guoqing Balanced and 1-balanced graph constructions. Discrete Appl. Math. 158 (2010), no. 14, 1511–1523.
- Fleischner, Herbert; Hobbs, Arthur M.; Tapfuma Muzheve, Michael Hamiltonicity in vertex envelopes of plane cubic graphs. Discrete Math. 309 (2009), no. 14, 4793–4809.
- Kannan, Lavanya; Hobbs, Arthur; Lai, Hong-Jian; Lai, Hongyuan Transforming a graph into a 1-balanced graph. Discrete Appl. Math. 157 (2009), no. 2, 300–308
- A. M. Hobbs, H.-J. Lai, H. Lai, and G. Weng, Constructing Uniformly Dense Graphs, preprint, October 1, 1994
