= Peter Hobbs =

Peter Hobbs may refer to:

- Peter Hobbs (actor) (1918–2011), American actor
- Peter Hobbs (composer) (born 1970), New Zealand composer
- Peter Hobbs (engineer) (1916–2008), British engineer
- Peter Hobbs (novelist) (born 1973), British novelist
- Peter Hobbs (rugby union), English rugby union player
- Peter V. Hobbs (1936–2005), British atmospheric scientist
