= Hobbs, Kentucky =

Unincorporated community in Kentucky, United States

Hobbs
- Unincorporated community
- Location within the state of Kentucky Hobbs (the United States)
- Coordinates: 37°55′38″N 85°37′31″W
- Country: United States
- State: Kentucky
- County: Bullitt
- Elevation: 587 ft (179 m)
- Time zone: UTC-5 (Eastern (EST))
  - Summer (DST): UTC-4 (EST)
- GNIS feature ID: 508259

Hobbs is an unincorporated community located in Bullitt County, Kentucky, United States. It was also known as Quarry Switch.
