= Bill Hobbs (baseball) =

American baseball player (1893–1945)

- Shortstop
- Born: May 7, 1893; Grant's Lick, Kentucky
- Died: January 5, 1945 (aged 51); Hamilton, Ohio
- Batted: Right Threw: Right

MLB debut
- August 9, 1913, for the Cincinnati Reds

Last MLB appearance
- August 27, 1916, for the Cincinnati Reds

MLB statistics
- Games played: 10
- At bats: 15
- Hits: 2
- Stats at Baseball Reference

Teams
- Cincinnati Reds (1913, 1916)

William Lee Hobbs (May 7, 1893 – January 5, 1945) was a shortstop in Major League Baseball. Nicknamed "Smokey", he played for the Cincinnati Reds.
