= John Hobbs (baseball) =

American baseball player (born 1956)

- Pitcher
- Born: November 11, 1956 (age 69); Philadelphia, Pennsylvania, U.S.
- Batted: Right Threw: Left

MLB debut
- August 31, 1981, for the Minnesota Twins

Last MLB appearance
- September 24, 1981, for the Minnesota Twins

MLB statistics
- Games pitched: 4
- Earned run average: 3.18
- Strikeouts: 1
- Stats at Baseball Reference

Teams
- Minnesota Twins (1981)

John Douglas "Jack" Hobbs (born November 11, 1956) is a former Major League Baseball pitcher who played for the Minnesota Twins in 1981. He played in the minor leagues from 1978 to 1983. Hobbs is also a radio broadcasting industry executive.

Jack Hobbs is a graduate of Lynchburg College, where he majored in Political Science / Pre Law. While at Lynchburg, Hobbs was named All-American in 1978 - and subsequently drafted by the Seattle Mariners in the 7th round of the 1978 amateur draft.

Hobbs was Drafted by the Minnesota Twins from the Mariners in December 8, 1980 in the rule 5 draft. Hobbs was 24 years old when he broke into the big leagues on August 31, 1981, with the Twins. His uniform number was 40.

Hobbs later entered the radio broadcasting industry and became Executive Vice President / Chief Marketing Officer of Spanish-language radio broadcaster Univision Radio, a division of Univision Communications Inc.

Hobbs has received recognition within the media, entertainment and marketing industries for his leadership and expertise related to the understanding of Hispanic consumer behavior in the United States. Throughout his successful career, Hobbs has received several distinguished accolades including recognition as one of the most influential executives in Hispanic Media. Jack Hobbs was honored by his peers in receiving the 2007 HispanicAd.com 'Media Executive of the Year' award at the Association of Hispanic Advertising Agencies bi-annual conference in San Antonio, Texas on Thursday April 17, 2008.
