= USS Hobby =

Benson-class destroyer

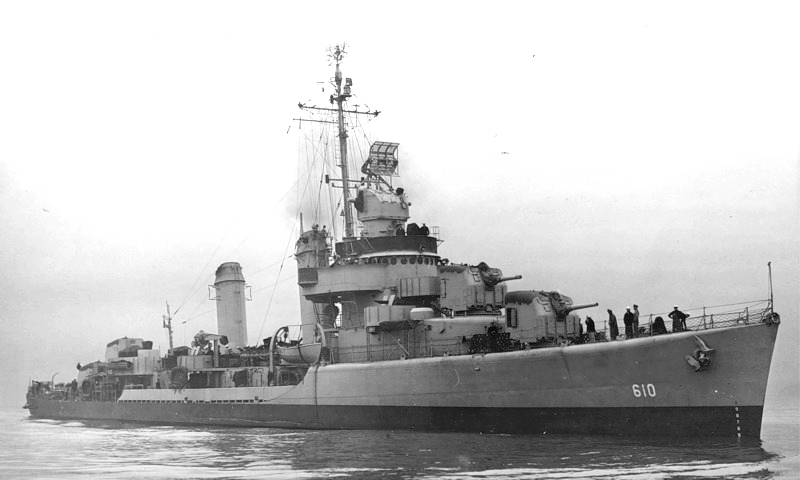
- USS Hobby, DD 610, Mare Island, 26 January 1943

History

United States
- Name: USS Hobby (DD-610)
- Namesake: James H. Hobby
- Builder: Bethlehem Shipbuilding Corporation, San Francisco, California
- Launched: 4 June 1942
- Commissioned: 18 November 1942
- Decommissioned: 1 February 1946
- Stricken: 1 July 1971
- Fate: Sunk in exercise, 1 June 1972

General characteristics
- Class & type: Benson-class destroyer
- Displacement: 1,620 tons
- Length: 348 ft 4 in (106.17 m)
- Beam: 36 ft 1 in (11.00 m)
- Draft: 17 ft 4 in (5.28 m)
- Speed: 38 knots (70 km/h; 44 mph)
- Complement: 259
- Armament: 4 × 5-inch 38 caliber guns; 4 × 20 mm guns; 5 × 21 inch (533 mm) torpedo tubes

USS Hobby (DD-610) was a Benson-class destroyer in the United States Navy during World War II.

== Namesake ==
James H. Hobby was born on 27 April 1835 at New Boston, New Hampshire. He was appointed 3rd assistant engineer in 1848. He resigned on 21 June 1855, but was re-appointed 2nd assistant engineer on 4 June 1861. He served with distinction throughout the American Civil War and as 1st assistant engineer of USS Sassacus, participated in an engagement with the Confederate ships CSS Bombshell and CSS Albemarle in Albemarle Sound on 5 May 1864. Although scalded when a shot from Albemarle cut Sassacus's steam pipes, Hobby remained at his post to control the engines, thus enabling the vessel to retire successfully from the action and preventing an explosion. When Sassacus was out of danger, the badly wounded engineer was carried to the deck for medical attention. For his heroism Hobby was promoted 30 numbers in grade. He was placed on the retired list on 19 October 1870, and died on 17 November 1882.

== Construction and commissioning ==
Hobby was launched on 4 June 1942 by the Bethlehem Steel Corporation, San Francisco, California; sponsored by Mrs. Walter Davis, whose four sons were on active duty with the Navy; and commissioned on 18 November 1942, Lieutenant Commander Ernest Blake in command.

- Film Reference, The launch of DD-610 was featured in the film the 1943 film DESTROYER

== Service history ==
After shakedown off the West Coast, Hobby proceeded to New York City on 12 February 1943, to begin transatlantic convoy duty between there and Casablanca. In five voyages to the Mediterranean Sea that year, Hobby developed several U-boat contacts and was credited with inflicting severe damage on one marauder on 9 May. She sailed from Norfolk, Virginia on 2 January 1944 for the Pacific, where she remained in the New Guinea area until 22 August providing fire support and ASW screen for various invasions in the Admiralty and Schouten Islands. Sailing north in the fall, Hobby provided fire support for Peleliu and Ngesebus island invasions and then remained on screening duty through November. Despite frequent contacts with Japanese aircraft, she emerged untouched.

On 10 December, Hobby sortied with the fast carriers of Task Force 38 for strikes on the important Philippines target of Luzon. She remained with the carriers through further strikes on the Philippines, Formosa, and the China coast into 1945, as U.S. naval power pushed closer to Japan. On 16 February, Hobby joined Admiral Marc Mitscher's fast carriers of the 5th Fleet as they carried out the first air strikes against Tokyo since the Doolittle Raid of April 1942. In addition to screening tankers for the carrier force, she operated off Iwo Jima and later off Okinawa as part of the valuable tankers ASW screen. Detached from Pacific duty at the end of June, Hobby arrived Seattle on 17 July 1945 for overhaul. News of the Japanese surrender reached her while she was in drydock.

Hobby sailed to New York on 6 October to participate in Navy Day ceremonies, during which she hosted foreign naval attaches and congressmen during the Presidential Review of the fleet. Proceeding to Charleston on 1 November 1945, Hobby decommissioned there and went into reserve on 1 February 1946. Hobby was transferred in January 1947 to Orange, Texas. She was struck from the Naval Vessel Register on 1 July 1971 and disposed of in a fleet exercise on 1 June 1972.

Film footage of the launching of USS Hobby was used as the "USS John Paul Jones" in the 1943 film Destroyer with Edward G. Robinson and Glenn Ford.

== Awards ==
Hobby was awarded 10 battle stars for her service in World War II.

As of 2009, no other ship in the United States Navy has been named Hobby.
