= USS William M. Hobby =

1944 Crosley-class high speed transport

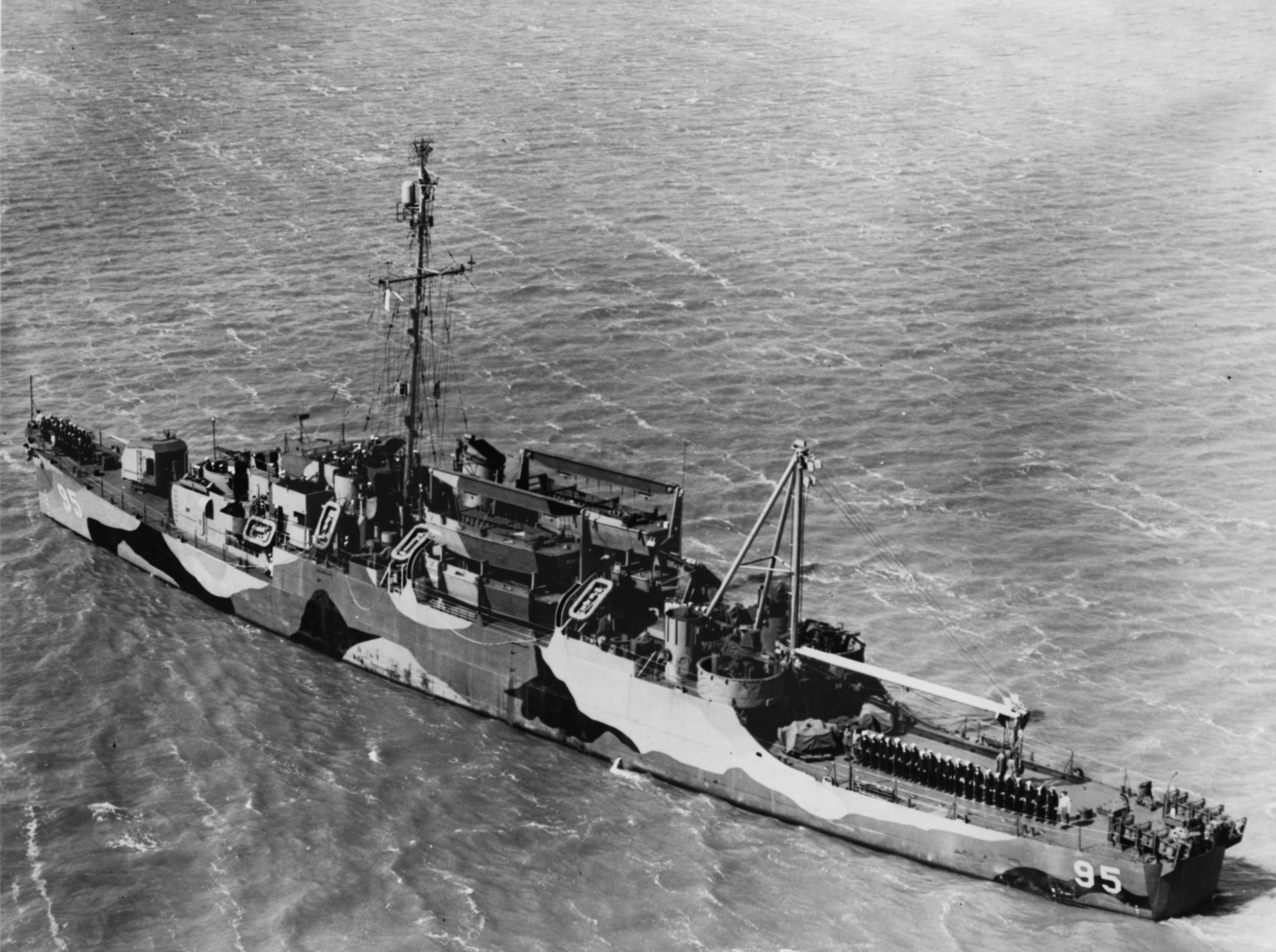
- USS William M. Hobby

History

United States
- Name: USS William M. Hobby
- Namesake: Commander William M. Hobby (1899-1942), U.S. Navy officer killed in action aboard USS Juneau (CL-52)
- Builder: Charleston Navy Yard
- Laid down: 15 November 1943
- Launched: 2 February 1944 (floated out of drydock)
- Sponsored by: Miss Catherine Hobby
- Commissioned: 4 April 1945
- Decommissioned: 6 April 1946
- Reclassified: From destroyer escort (DE-236) to high-speed transport (APD-95) 17 June 1945 or 17 July 1944
- Stricken: 1 May 1967
- Fate: Transferred to South Korea 23 July 1967; served in Republic of Korea Navy as ROKS Jeju (PF-87), later reclassified as APD-87; stricken and scrapped 1989
- Notes: Laid down as Rudderow-class destroyer escort USS William M. Hobby (DE-236)

General characteristics
- Class & type: Crosley-class high speed transport
- Displacement: 2,130 long tons (2,164 t) full
- Length: 306 ft (93 m)
- Beam: 37 ft (11 m)
- Draft: 12 ft 7 in (3.84 m)
- Speed: 23 knots (43 km/h; 26 mph)
- Troops: 162
- Complement: 204
- Armament: 1 × 5 in (130 mm) gun; 6 × 40 mm guns; 6 × 20 mm guns; 2 × depth charge tracks

USS William M. Hobby (APD-95), ex-DE-236, was a United States Navy high-speed transport in commission from 1945 to 1946.

== Namesake ==
William Matthews Hobby Jr., was born on 27 July 1899 in Sylvania, Georgia. He was appointed a midshipman from the Georgia's 1st congressional district on 20 June 1919, attended the United States Naval Academy at Annapolis, Maryland, and graduated in the class of 1923. After initial sea duty on the battleship USS Oklahoma from June 1923 to April 1925, Hobby underwent brief aviation instruction at Naval Air Station Pensacola at Pensacola, Florida. He then reported to the destroyer USS Kidder on 21 November 1925 and served in Kidder as she earned the Second Nicaraguan Campaign Medal.

Hobby then underwent submarine instruction at Submarine Base New London in New London, Connecticut, from late December 1927 to June 1928. He then travelled to the United States Asiatic Fleet, where he reported to the submarine tender USS Canopus on 10 August 1928, prior to his joining the submarine USS S-37 on 20 August 1928. After successive tours in the submarines USS S-41 and USS S-30, Hobby returned to the United States for service at the United States Naval Academy from May 1931 to June 1933. He then helped to fit out the submarine USS Cachalot before serving back-to-back tours on the battleship USS Tennessee and training ship USS Wyoming into the summer of 1938.

Hobby reported to the Federal Shipbuilding and Dry Dock Company at Kearny, New Jersey, on 11 May 1939, to supervise the fitting out of the new Sims-class destroyer USS Anderson and to become its first commanding officer when it was placed in commission. Detached from Anderson on 22 March 1941, Hobby then rejoined the battleship Oklahoma on 26 March 1941 as damage control officer and first lieutenant. After Oklahoma capsized and sank in the Japanese attack on Pearl Harbor on 7 December 1941, Hobby served briefly in the 12th Naval District before he joined the new battleship USS Washington on 3 January 1942. He acted as navigator of Washington until he relieved Commander Walter E. Moore as executive officer of the light cruiser USS Juneau at Espiritu Santo on 2 November 1942.

On 12 November 1942, ten days after he reported aboard, Juneau was heavily damaged during the Naval Battle of Guadalcanal. The following afternoon, 13 November 1942, while it was returning to Espiritu Santo, the Japanese submarine I-26 torpedoed Juneau. The torpedo hit detonated Juneau's magazine, and the ship disintegrated in a massive explosion, leaving only ten survivors.

== Construction and commissioning ==
William M. Hobby was laid down as the Rudderow-class destroyer escort USS William M. Hobby (DE-236) on 15 November 1943 by the Charleston Navy Yard. She was built in a drydock and floated out on 2 February 1944, so there was no formal launching. The ship was reclassified as a Crosley-class high-speed transport and redesignated APD-95 on either 17 June 1945 or 17 July 1944. After conversion to her new role, she was simultaneously christened—sponsored by Miss Catherine Hobby, sister of the ship's namesake, Commander William M. Hobby—and commissioned on 4 April 1945.

== Service history ==
=== World War II ===
Following shakedown training in Guantánamo Bay, Cuba, William M. Hobby proceeded to Norfolk, Virginia. From 16 May 1945 to 21 May 1945, she conducted an "amphibious shakedown," including shore bombardment exercises off Bloodsworth Island in Chesapeake Bay. After post-shakedown repairs at the Norfolk Navy Yard in Portsmouth, Virginia, William M. Hobby held additional shakedown gunnery training in Chesapeake Bay before she departed Hampton Roads, Virginia, on 3 June 1945, bound for the Panama Canal Zone in company with the high-speed transport USS Amesbury (APD-46).

William M. Hobby reached Cristóbal, Panama Canal Zone, on 8 June 1945, completed the transit of the Panama Canal on 10 June 1945, and set course for the California coast immediately thereafter. Arriving at San Diego, California on 17 June 1945, she got underway for the Hawaiian Islands in company with Amesbury and destroyer escort USS O'Reilly (DE-330) on 20 June 1945.

Arriving at Pearl Harbor, Territory of Hawaii, on 27 June 1945, William M. Hobby trained underwater demolition teams at Ma'alaea Bay, Maui, Territory of Hawaii, in July before she embarked Underwater Demolition Team 29 for transportation to the United States West Coast. Departing the Hawaiian Islands on 2 August 1945, William M. Hobby made port at Oceanside, California, on 9 August 1945.

Shifting briefly to San Pedro, California, William M. Hobby returned to Oceanside and disembarked Underwater Demolition Team 29 on 13 August 1945. The following day, 14 August 1945 – 15 August 1945 across the International Date Line in East Asia -- Japan surrendered, ending World War II.

=== Postwar ===
On 16 August 1945, William M. Hobby got underway for Hawaii. Reaching Pearl Harbor on 22 August 1945, she got underway on 24 August 1945 for the Marshall Islands, in company with high-speed transports USS Ira Jeffrey (APD-44) and USS Blessman (APD-48), and arrived at Eniwetok on 1 September 1945. Pushing on to the Philippines, she anchored in Manila Bay on 5 September 1945. William M. Hobby cruised in the Philippine Islands—touching at Subic Bay, Zamboanga, Mindanao, Bugo, Macajalar Bay, and San Pedro Bay—until she departed for Okinawa, and from thence to Japan.

Reaching Wakayama, Japan, on 28 September 1945, William M. Hobby soon got underway for Hiro Wan, Honshu, with Underwater Demolition Team 5 embarked. Daybreak on 1 October 1945 found her entering the Inland Sea. There, she joined destroyer minelayer USS Tracy (DM-19), which led William M. Hobby to her anchorage at Hiro Wan. That morning, William M. Hobby sighted a floating naval mine off her port bow and destroyed it with 40-millimeter, 20-millimeter, and rifle fire. William M. Hobby's embarked underwater demolition team reconnoitered beaches and shore installations at Hiro Wan from 2 October 1945 to 10 October 1945 to prepare the way for the arrival of American occupation troops in the Kure area.

On 11 October 1945, William M. Hobby got underway for the island of Shikoku and arrived at the port of Mitsuhama later that day. She disembarked the 15 United States Army officers, 18 enlisted men, and two Japanese officers whom she had carried as passengers and remained at anchor off Mitsuhama while Underwater Demolition Team 5 reconnoitered the beaches there.

After returning once more to Hiro Wan, William M. Hobby got underway for the United States on 14 October 1945. Proceeding via Guam, Eniwetok, Pearl Harbor, San Diego, and the Panama Canal, she arrived at Philadelphia, Pennsylvania, on 9 December 1945. She subsequently shifted southward via Norfolk to Green Cove Springs, Florida, where she arrived on 6 January 1946.

== Decommissioning and disposal ==
William M. Hobby was decommissioned at Green Cove Springs on 6 April 1946 and placed in reserve there. She remained in reserve until she was stricken from the Navy List on 1 May 1967.

== Republic of Korea Navy service ==
Transferred to the government of South Korea on a grant-in-aid on 23 July 1967, William M. Hobby was reclassified in Republic of Korea Navy service as a gunboat and renamed ROKS Chr Ju (PG-87). In 1972, Chr Ju was reclassified in South Korean service as a high-speed transport and redesignated APD-87.

Chr Ju was stricken by the Republic of Korea Navy and scrapped in 1989.
