= Baptist Hicks, 1st Viscount Campden =

English cloth merchant and politician

Baptist Hicks
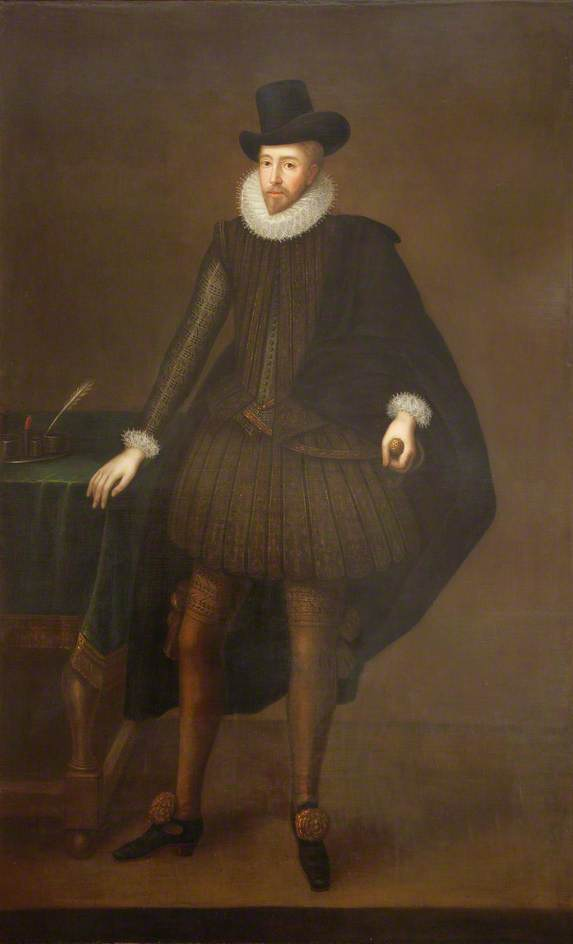
- Born: 1551
- Died: 18 October 1629 (aged 77–78)
- Occupations: Merchant, politician
- Mother: Julian Penn
- Relatives: Michael Hicks (brother)

Baptist Hicks, 1st Viscount Campden (1551 – 18 October 1629) was an English cloth merchant and politician who sat in the House of Commons between 1621 and 1628. King James I knighted Hicks in 1603 and in 1620 he was created a baronet.

He was MP for Tavistock in the House of Commons of 1621 and for Tewkesbury in the parliaments of 1624, 1625, 1626 and 1628. In 1628, he was elevated to the peerage as Baron Hicks, of Ilmington in the County of Warwick, and Viscount Campden, of Campden in the County of Gloucester, with remainder to his son-in-law, Edward Noel, husband of his daughter Juliana.

== Early life ==
Hicks was the youngest of six sons born to Robert and Juliana Hicks, and the grandson of John Hicks of Tortworth. His father died while Baptist was only a child. His mother was a moneylender and he was one of three sons who survived childhood. The others were Clement and Michael Hickes.

Baptist Hicks matriculated at Trinity College, Cambridge, in 1568 and was admitted to the Inner Temple in 1573.

== Career ==
Hicks was brought up in his father's business and took over the business from his mother, who died in 1592. He imported rich silks from Italy and other foreign places. Through the influence of his brother Michael he contracted a large amount of business with the court and amassed a large fortune. Hicks sold "watchet" blue velvet and taffeta for bed hangings to the Earl of Northumberland in 1586, from his shop at the sign of the White Bear. By 1596 he was appointed Mercer to Queen Elizabeth I regarding the purchase of fabrics. In April 1602 Hicks supplied Elizabeth I with satin used for "maskes and byllements".

Hicks supplied textiles to James VI of Scotland, notably for the occasion of the baptism of Prince Henry at Stirling Castle in 1594. Hicks wrote to James VI on 1 March 1600 hoping for repayment of sums due to him by Robert Jousie, a bankrupted textile merchant working on the king's behalf. He had written twice before to the king, and was disappointed to hear from the Scottish ambassador that he would not be paid from the annuity awarded by Queen Elizabeth. Hicks employed Humphrey Dethick as his factor in Florence buying fabrics, until he left in 1602.

Having made large loans to the Crown and prominent courtiers, he was knighted on 23 July 1603, soon after the accession of James I. Hicks was one of the first citizens who kept a shop (at the White Bear on Cheapside) to continue in trade once knighted. James ordered Hicks to send a variety of fabrics to Scotland for his wife, Anne of Denmark. Hicks was asked to supply crimson velvet, damask, and satin for the coronation on 25 July. He was paid £3,000, but was left with 1,400 yards of unused fabric. He was in dispute with the Court of Aldermen of the City of London because he was unwilling to serve as an alderman; however the king directed that he be excused as a "king's servant".

Hicks supplied King James's court with silks and "rich mercery ware", and supplied velvet to Bess of Hardwick and her son William Cavendish, 1st Earl of Devonshire. He was allocated £2000 from the duty on sea coal to remunerate him for fabric supplied to royal wardrobe ordered by the Earl of Dunbar.

With Thomas Woodward, Hicks provided the fabrics supplied to Princess Elizabeth for her wedding to Frederick V of the Palatinate in February 1613; and to the Lord Chancellor, Francis Bacon, for the visit of the Archbishop of Spalato in 1618.

Hicks was created a baronet on 1 July 1620 and began a career in public service. He was appointed one of the Commissioners to inquire into the condition of St. Paul's Cathedral, and was elected as MP for Tavistock in 1620, and for Tewkesbury from 1624 to 1628.

On 5 May 1628 he was ennobled as Baron Hicks of Ilmington in the County of Warwick, and Viscount Campden of Campden.

== Estates and philanthropy ==
Sir Baptist Hicks's estate in Chipping Campden, after a drawing from the 18th century

Hicks's commercial success enabled him to acquire country estates. He purchased the manor of Campden soon after 1608 and built a large manor house there near the church, around 1612. The property included gardens, a very early example of a garden canal, water gardens and terraces. The house was burned down by Royalists in the Civil War.

He purchased the manor of Exton, Rutland, in 1614, where members of the Hicks and Campden family are buried in the parish church. In 1620, he purchased the manor of Hampstead.

He founded and endowed an almshouse in 1612 for 12 pensioners in Chipping Campden; the Grade I listed Almshouses on Church Street still remains in use for that purpose. In 1627, he built a market hall at the centre of Chipping Campden as a shelter for the vendors; the Grade I listed building is still in use.

Hicks also built a large mansion in Kensington; and paid for a new sessions house for the Middlesex magistrates in Clerkenwell, which was named Hicks Hall in his honour.

He performed many other charitable acts, giving £100,000 for charity.

== Personal life, death, and legacy ==
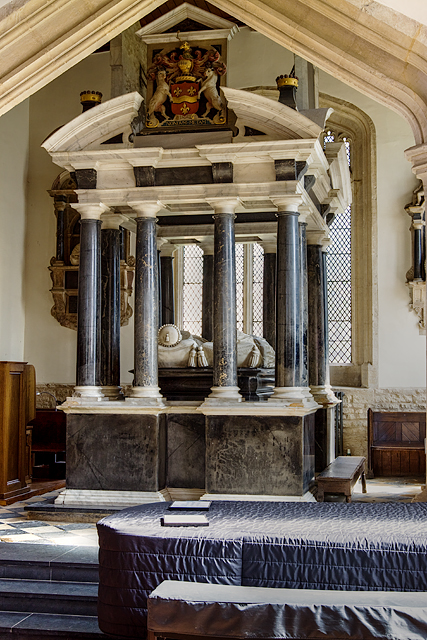
The Hicks memorial in St James church

Hicks married Elizabeth May on 7 September 1584. She was the daughter of Richard May of London and Sussex, and sister of Sir Humphrey May, Alderman of London. They had three sons, who all died young, and two daughters.

His elder daughter Julianna married Edward, Lord Noel, a son of Andrew Noel and his wife Mabel Harington, who became 2nd Viscount Campden.

His younger daughter Mary married:

1. Sir Charles Morrison, 1st Baronet of Cashiobury,
2. Sir John Cooper, 1st Baronet,
3. Sir Edward Alford.

Hicks died at the age of 78 and is buried under a classical monument in Chipping Campden St James church.

His will left £10,000 for charitable purposes; the funds helped to establish Campden Charities, a non-profit organization to alleviate poverty in Kensington.

All that now remains of Sir Baptist Hicks's once imposing estate are a gatehouse and two Jacobean banqueting houses; the latter of which were restored by the Landmark Trust. Afterwards, Lady Juliana Noel, Sir Baptist's daughter, her husband Edward Noel, 2nd Viscount Campden, and family lived at the converted stables near the site in Calf Lane, now called the Court House. Her descendant still lives in that Grade II listed building.

Parliament of England
Preceded by Edward Duncombe; Sir Francis Glanville	Member of Parliament for Tavistock; 1621–1622; With: Sir Francis Glanville	Succeeded by John Pym; Sampson Hele
Preceded by Giles Brydges; Sir Dudley Digges	Member of Parliament for Tewkesbury; 1624–1628; With: Sir Dudley Digges 1624–1626; Sir Thomas Colepeper 1628	Succeeded by Sir Thomas Colepeper; Sir William Hicks
Peerage of England
New creation	Viscount Campden; 1628–1629	Succeeded by Edward Noel
Baronetage of England
New creation	Baronet (of Campden); 1620–1629	Extinct
