= John Strype =

English clergyman, historian and biographer (1643–1737)

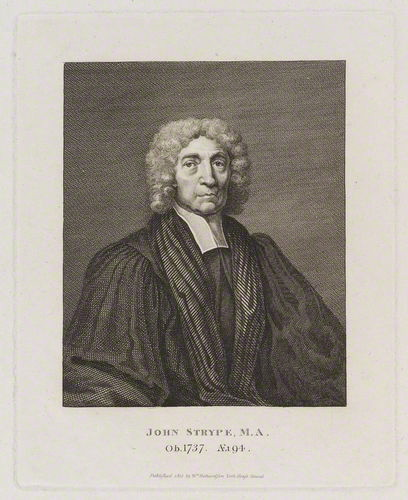
John Strype, engraving by William Richardson.

John Strype (1 November 1643 – 11 December 1737) was an English clergyman, historian and biographer from London. He became a merchant when settling in Petticoat Lane. In his twenties, he became perpetual curate of Theydon Bois, Essex and later became curate of Leyton; this allowed him direct correspondence with several highly notable ecclesiastical figures of his time. He wrote extensively in his later years.

== Life ==
Born in Houndsditch, London, he was the son of John Strype (or van Stryp) and cousin to sailor and writer Robert Knox. A member of a Huguenot family who, in order to escape religious persecution within Brabant, had settled in East London. Located in what has now become known as Strype Street in Petticoat Lane, he was a merchant and silk throwster. The younger John was educated at St Paul's School, and on 5 July 1662 entered Jesus College, Cambridge; he went on from there to St Catharine's Hall, where he graduated B.A. in 1665 and M.A. in 1669.

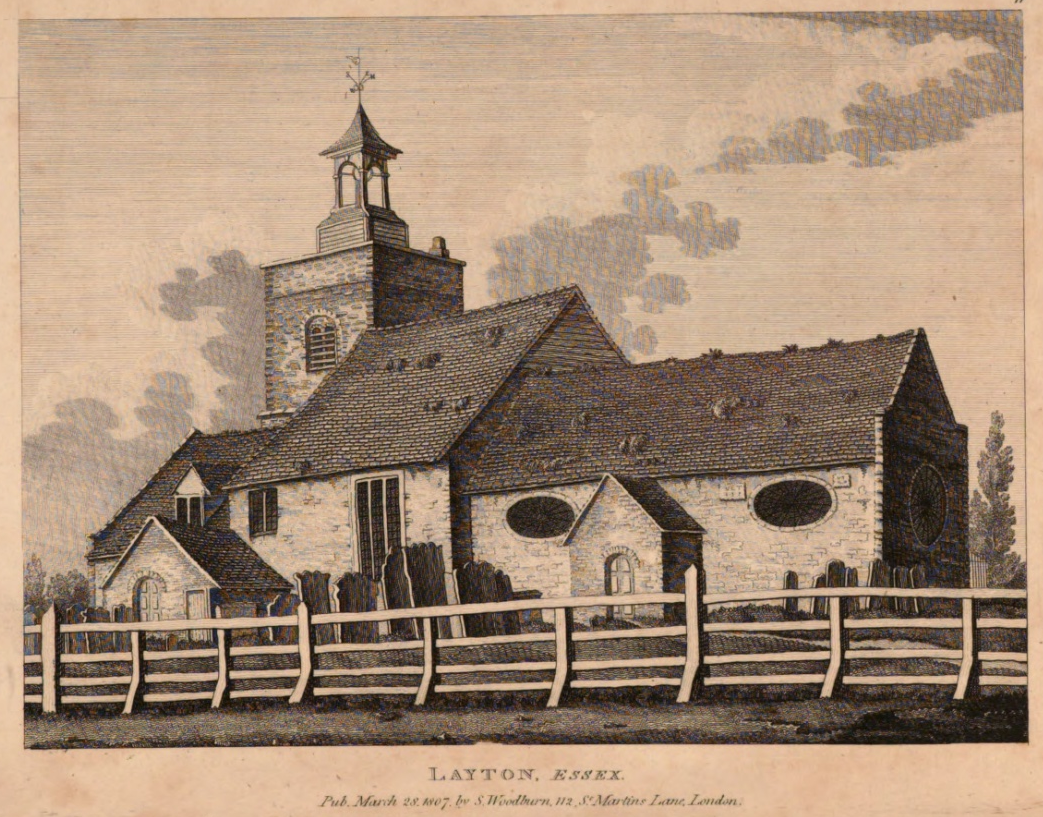
St Mary's Church, Leyton, where Strype was the curate and parish priest for 68 years and is buried.

On 14 July 1669 Strype became perpetual curate of Theydon Bois, and a few months afterwards curate and lecturer of Leyton in the same county. He was never instituted or inducted to the living of St Mary's Church, Leyton, but in 1674 he was licensed by the Bishop of London to preach and expound the word of God, and to perform the office of priest and curate while it was vacant, and until his death he received the profits of it. In 1711 he obtained from Archbishop Thomas Tenison the sinecure of West Tarring, Sussex, and he discharged the duties of lecturer at Hackney from 1689 until 1724. In Hackney, he spent his last years with a married granddaughter, the wife of a surgeon, Thomas Harris, dying there at the age of 94. He was buried in the church at Leyton.

== Works ==
Through his friendship with Sir William Hicks, Strype obtained access to the papers of Sir Michael Hicks, secretary to Lord Burghley, from which he made extensive transcripts; he also carried on an extensive correspondence with Archbishop William Wake and Bishops Gilbert Burnet, Francis Atterbury and Nicholson. The materials he obtained were used in his historical and biographical works, which relate chiefly to the period of the Protestant Reformation. Most of his original materials have been preserved, and are included among the Lansdowne manuscripts in the British Library. His publications consist historical reference material of considerable value, and are convenient books of reference.

Strype's major works are:

- the Memorials of Thomas Cranmer, Archbishop of Canterbury, 1694 (ed. for the EccI. Hist. Soc., in 3 vols., Oxford, 1848–1854; and in 2 vols. with notes by PE Barnes, London, 1853)
- Life of the learned Sir Thomas Smith (1698)
- Life and Acts of John Aylmer, Lord Bishop of London (1701)
- Life of the learned Sir John Cheke, with his Treatise on Superstition (1705)
- Annals of the Reformation in England (4 volumes: vol. I 1709–1725; vol. II 1725; vol. III 1728; vol. IV 1731, 2nd edition 1735, 3rd edition 1736–1738)
- Life and Acts of Edmund Grindal, Archbishop of Canterbury (1710)
- Life and Acts of Matthew Parker, Archbishop of Canterbury (1711)
- Life and Acts of John Whitgift, Archbishop of Canterbury (1718)
- A Survey of the Cities of London and Westminster (1720), an updated edition of the original A Survey of London by John Stow (1598, 2nd edition 1603)
- Ecclesiastical Memorials (5 vols., 1721; 3 vols., 1733).

His Historical and Biographical Works were reprinted in 59 vols. at the Clarendon Press, Oxford, between 1812 (Cranmer) and 1824 (Annals). A general index by Robert French Laurence in 2 vols. was added in 1828. Strype also published, besides a number of single sermons, an edition of John Lightfoot's Works (1684); and in 1700 Some genuine Remains of John Lightfoot ... with a large preface concerning the author.

=== Online versions ===
- Memorials of the Most Reverend Father in God, Thomas Cranmer, Sometime Lord Archbishop of Canterbury by John Strype (Oxford University Press, 1812): Volume I, Volume II
- The Life of the Learned Sir Thomas Smith, Kt.D.C.L. by John Strype (Clarendon Press, 1820)
- Historical Collection of the Life and Acts of John Aylmer by John Strype (1821 ed.)
- The Life of the Learned Sir John Cheke, Kt. by John Strype (1821 ed.)
- The Life and Acts of Edmund Grindal by John Strype (1821 ed.)
- The Life and Acts of Matthew Parker by John Strype (1821 ed.): Volume I, Volume II, Volume III
- The Life and Acts of John Whitgift, D.D. by John Strype (1822 ed.): Volume I, Volume II, Volume III
- Ecclesiastical Memorials, Relating Chiefly to Religion, and the Reformation of It, and the Emergencies of the Church of England, Under King Henry VIII, King Edward VI, and Queen Mary I by John Strype (Clarendon Press, 1822): Vol. I, Pt. I, Vol. I, Pt. II, Vol. II, Pt. I, Vol. II, Pt. II, Vol. III, Pt. I, Vol. III, Pt. II
- Annals of the Reformation and Establishment of Religion, and Other Various Occurrences in the Church of England, During Queen Elizabeth's Happy Reign by John Strype (1824 ed.): Vol. I, Pt. I, Vol. I, Pt. II, Vol. II, Pt. I, Vol. II., Pt. II, Vol. III, Pt. I, Vol. III, Pt. II, Vol. IV
