= Hicks-Beach =

Hicks-Beach or Hicks Beach is a surname, and may refer to:

- Hicks baronets
- Various of the Hicks and Hicks Beach Baronets, of Beverston, and the family of the Earl St Aldwyn
  - Sir Michael Hicks Beach, 8th Baronet (1809–1854), Conservative Member of Parliament for East Gloucestershire
  - Michael Hicks Beach, 1st Earl St Aldwyn (1837–1916), Conservative Member of Parliament, Chancellor of the Exchequer
  - Michael Hicks Beach, 2nd Earl St Aldwyn (1912–1992), Conservative politician
- William Frederick Hicks-Beach (1841–1923), Conservative Member of Parliament for Tewkesbury 1916–1918
- Michael Hugh Hicks-Beach, Viscount Quenington (1877–1916), Conservative Member of Parliament for Tewkesbury 1906–1916
- William W. Hicks Beach (1907–1975), Conservative Party Member of Parliament for Cheltenham 1950–1964
