= Diggs baronets =

Extinct baronetcy in the Baronetage of England

Escutcheon of the Diggs baronets of Chilham Castle

The Diggs baronetcy, of Chilham Castle in the County of Kent, was a title in the Baronetage of England. It was created on 6 March 1666 for Maurice Diggs. He was the grandson of Sir Dudley Digges, Master of the Rolls from 1636 to 1639, and the great-grandson of Sir Thomas Digges, the astronomer and mathematician. The title became extinct on Diggs's death in 1672.

== Marriage and issue ==
Diggs married, firstly, Bennet Dixwell, daughter of Mark Dixwell of Folkestone and Brome, and sister of Sir Basil Dixwell, 1st Baronet of the Dixwell baronets of Tirlingham (1628). He married, secondly in 1661, Judith Rose, daughter and co-heir of George Rose, of Eastergate, Sussex. He left no issue.

== Diggs baronets, of Chilham Castle (1666) ==
- Sir Maurice Diggs, 1st Baronet (c. 1638–1666)
