= Thomas Colepeper (Royalist) =

English Royalist politician and writer on usury

Sir Thomas Colepeper (1578 – January 1661) was an English politician who sat in the House of Commons at various times between 1614 and 1629. He supported the Royalist cause in the English Civil War. He is known also as a writer on usury.

== Life ==
Colepeper was the third son of Francis Colepeper of Hollingbourne Manor, Kent, and the eldest by his second wife Joan Pordage (died 1597), daughter of John Pordage of Rodmersham, and widow of William Stede of Harrietsham. He matriculated at Hart Hall, Oxford on 15 October 1591 at the age of 13. His father died the same year, and left him his favourite house, Greenway Court. He entered Middle Temple in 1594.

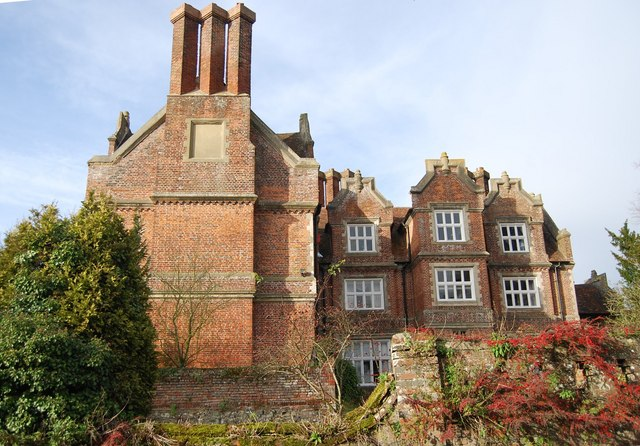
Hollingbourne Manor, the main Colepeper residence

== Career ==
In 1614, Colepeper was elected Member of Parliament for Chippenham in the Addled Parliament. He was knighted on 23 September 1619. In 1628 he was elected MP for Tewkesbury and sat until 1629 when King Charles I decided to rule without parliament for eleven years.

Colepeper had a large estate at Hasleton near Northleach, Kent. In 1632 he bought Leeds Castle as a home for his sons, although he later disinherited his eldest son Sir Cheney over their political differences. During the English Civil War he was an officer of the King's revenue, but never took up arms. On 39 April 1646, he compounded for delinquency. He was set a fine of £1,318 on 24 September 1646 which was reduced on review on 16 January 1647 to £1044, and further reduced on 27 November 1647 to £844. His finances never fully recovered from the burden of the fine, he died deeply in debt. He was imprisoned briefly in 1651. Until the Restoration of Charles II he lived quietly on his estates. He may have hoped, despite his age, to play some part in politics after the Restoration, since his son-in-law Lord Colepeper was close to the King, but Lord Colepeper died almost at once.

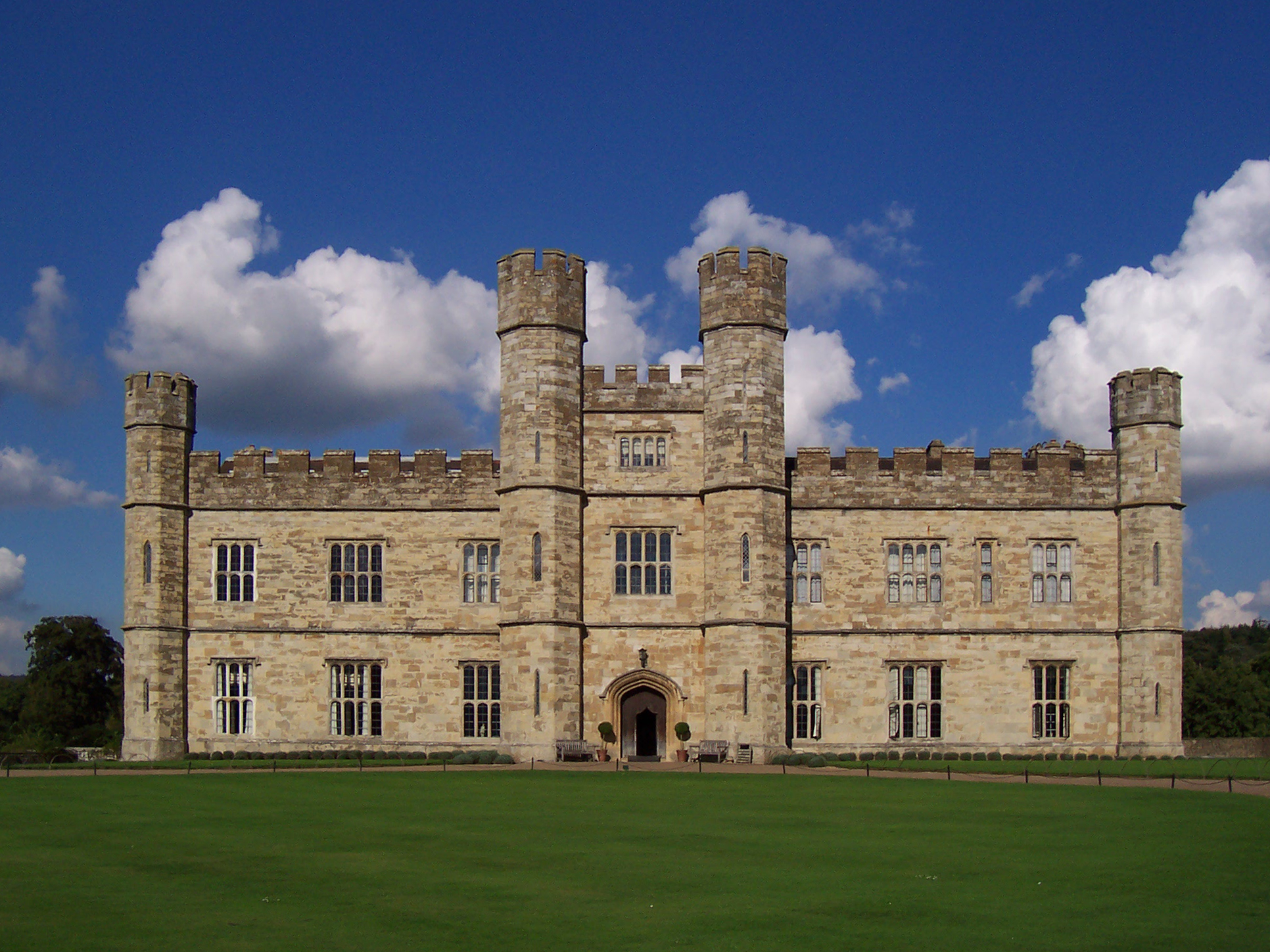
Leeds Castle, which Sir Thomas bought in 1632

== Family ==
Colepeper died in 1661 and was buried at Hollingbourne on 25 January 1661, beside his wife in the chapel which he had built to house their remains. He had married in 1600 Elizabeth Cheney, daughter of John Cheney of Guestling, Sussex; she died in 1638. They had eleven children, including Sir Cheney Culpeper, Thomas junior, who inherited most of the family estates after their father's quarrel with Cheney, John, Cicely, who married Ralph Freke, and Judith, who was the second wife of her cousin John Colepeper, 1st Baron Colepeper, one of the King's closest advisers.

== Works ==
Colepeper published in 1623 his Tract against the High Rate of Usury, a work already presented to Parliament two years earlier. In it he argued for a reduction of the highest permitted annual interest rate, from 10%, presenting a case from other countries where the limit was 6%. Legislation in 1624 reduced the limit to 8%. Colepeper's work was reprinted in 1641, and in 1668.

Parliament of England
Preceded by Sir Dudley Digges; Baptist Hicks	Member of Parliament for Tewkesbury; 1628–1629; With: Baptist Hicks 1628; Sir William Hicks, 1st Baronet	Parliament suspended until 1640
