= Mary Halford =

Mary Halford may refer to:

- Mary Halford (tennis) (1915–2009), British tennis player
- Mary Halford, birth name of Mary Davis (1866–1941), British artist

== See also ==
- Mary Holford
