= Jeremiah Whitaker Newman =

English surgeon and medical writer;

- Born: 1759
- Died: 27 July 1839 (aged 79–80)
- Occupations: Surgeon and medical writer

Jeremiah Whitaker Newman (1759 – 27 July 1839) was an English surgeon and medical writer.

== Biography ==
Newman was the son of Arthur Newman, surgeon, of Ringwood, Hampshire. He was born in 1759.

=== Career ===
He became a member of the Corporation of Surgeons, and was in practice at Ringwood in 1783. In consequence of ill-health he removed to Dover, where he made the acquaintance of Sir Thomas Mantell and his wife, and resided for many years in their house.

On 9 Dec. 1790 he was admitted an extra-licentiate of the College of Physicians of London (Munk, Coll. of Phys. 2nd edit. ii. 414). He was a favourite with the eccentric Messenger Monsey, the resident physician at Chelsea Hospital, of whom he wrote (but did not publish) an amusing memoir.

=== Personal life ===
He married and settled on his own estate at Ringwood, where he died on 27 July 1839.

== Publications ==
His principal work, published anonymously, was The Lounger's Commonplace Book, or Miscellaneous Collections in History, Criticism, Biography, Poetry, and Romance, 3rd edit. 4 vols., London, 1805–7, 8vo; and 2 vols., London, 1838, 8vo.

He also wrote A Short Inquiry into the Merits of Solvents, so far as it may be necessary to compare them with the Operation of Lithotomy, London, 1781, 8vo; and ‘An Essay on the Principles and Manners of the Medical Profession; with some Occasional Remarks on the Use and Abuse of Medicines. These two tracts were republished in 1789 under the title of Medical Essays, with Additions.
