= Chilham =

Village in Kent, England

Coordinates: 51.244°N 0.961°E

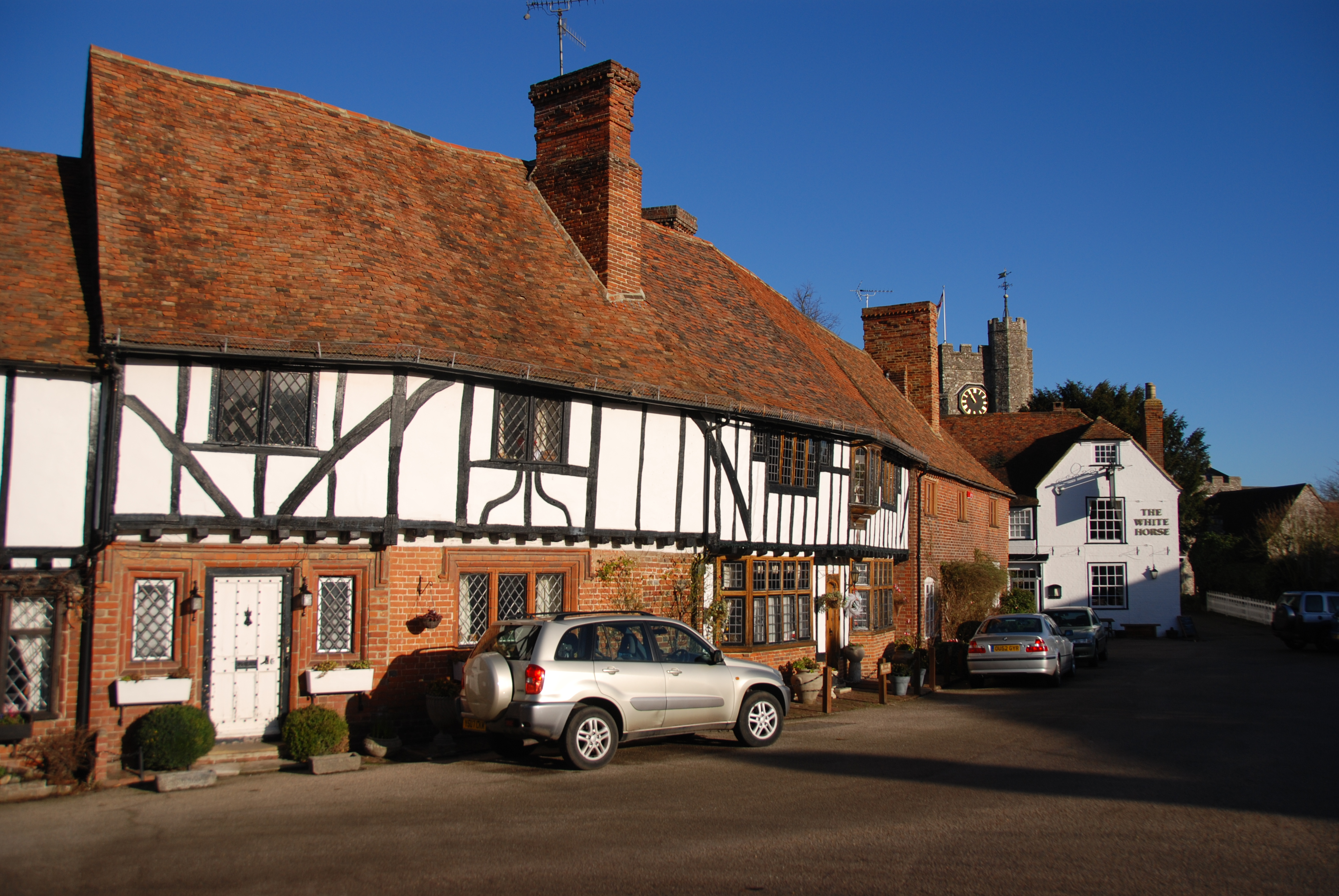
- Chilham Square

- Location within Kent
- Area: 13.85 km^{2} (5.35 sq mi)
- Population: 1,124 (Civil Parish 2011)
  - Density: 81/km^{2} (210/sq mi)
- OS grid reference: TR065536
- Civil parish: Chilham
- District: Ashford
- Shire county: Kent
- Region: South East
- Country: England
- Sovereign state: United Kingdom
- Post town: CANTERBURY
- Postcode district: CT4
- Dialling code: 01227
- Police: Kent
- Fire: Kent
- Ambulance: South East Coast
- UK Parliament: Weald of Kent

Chilham is a village and civil parish in the Borough of Ashford in Kent, England. It sits on the north bank of the Great Stour around 5 1/2 miles (9 kilometres) to the southwest of Canterbury and seven miles (eleven kilometres) northeast of Ashford. It is a mostly agricultural parish, with settlement clustered around Chilham village centre, which is next to the Grade I-listed Chilham Castle. Well-preserved roads and mostly residential listed buildings in the centre have led to its use as a location in television and film. Also lying within the civil parish is the smaller linear settlement of Shottenden, which is situated 1 1/2 miles (2.5 kilometres) west of Chilham.

== History ==
The village has a number of period houses such as the former vicarage, which dates from 1742.

The village is supposed to have been the first place in England to be bombed by the Germans during World War II.

The castle was owned by the Viscounts Massereene and Ferrard until its sale in 1997. From 2013 it was owned by Stuart Wheeler, founder of the spread-betting firm IG Index, until his death in July 2020.

== Geography ==
The village of Chilham is in the valley of the Great Stour River and beside the A28 road six miles (ten kilometres) southwest of Canterbury. It is centred on a market square, where a traditional annual May Day is celebrated. At each end of the square are its major buildings: Chilham Castle and the 15th-century parish church, dedicated to St Mary. It has been claimed that St Thomas Becket was buried in the churchyard, despite his ornate tomb in Canterbury Cathedral, destroyed at the Reformation. There are two other named localities in the civil parish: Shottenden and a much smaller neighbourhood, Old Wives Lees.

The Pilgrims Way passes through Chilham on the way to Canterbury, and the railway station is in a part of the village sometimes called Bagham on the line from Ashford to Canterbury.

== Amenities ==
There are two large public houses in Chilham, the Woolpack and the White Horse, which dates from the 16th century. Other amenities include a restaurant and tea shop, post office, gift shop, bus stop, tennis club, sports centre, children's playground and 15th-century village hall which originally was the tithe barn for the castle. Most shops are also along the main through road towards Canterbury just before the entry to the network of streets having the oldest buildings in the village.

== Culture and media ==
The Neolithic longbarrow of Julliberrie's Grave is on the Julliberrie Downs east of the river.

Chilham and the surrounding area was one of the locations for much of Powell and Pressburger's 1944 film A Canterbury Tale. In 1965 it was used for part of the filming of The Amorous Adventures of Moll Flanders starring Kim Novak, Leo McKern and Angela Lansbury, and it was also used as a location for the BBC's 2009 adaptation of Jane Austen's novel Emma. The village and the castle featured heavily in a fake snow-bound episode of Agatha Christie's Poirot called Hercule Poirot's Christmas starring David Suchet. The village was made over to sunnier times for The Moving Finger, a mystery featuring Agatha Christie's other famous sleuth Miss Jane Marple, portrayed by Geraldine McEwan, and appeared as Riseholme in the 1985 LWT/Channel 4 adaptation of E.F. Benson's Mapp and Lucia, which also starred Geraldine McEwan.

== Notable residents ==
- Sir George Colbrooke (1729–1809), banker
- Dudley Digges (1582/3–1639), politician and diplomat
- West Digges (1720–1786), actor and theatre manager
- Philip Francis (1708–1773), writer and translator
- Thomas Mantell (1751–1831), antiquary
- William Ridge (1859–1930), novelist and short-story writer
- Charles Shannon (1863–1937), artist
- Augustus Toplady (1740–1778), cleric

== See also ==
- Listed buildings in Chilham
