= Julian Penn =

English business person and moneylender

- Born: Julian Arthur (prob) Clapton in Gordano
- Died: 14 November 1592
- Other names: Julian(a) Hick(e)s
- Occupation: moneylender
- Known for: businessperson and moneylender
- Spouse(s): Robert Hicks; Anthony Penn
- Children: 3; including Baptist Hicks, Michael Hicks

Julian Penn born Julian Arthur became Julian Hicks (c. 1520 – 14 November 1592) was an English business person and moneylender. She owned lands in London and Bristol and ran businesses.

== Life ==
Penn was probably born in Clapton in Gordano as her father Willam Arthur was from there. She married Robert Hicks but its not known when or where this took place. They lived in London where her husband ran the White Bear mercer's shop in the City of London on Cheapside. They had six sons. The eldest son became Sir Michael Hickes and two others, Baptist Hicks, 1st Viscount Campden and Clement Hickes survived childhood.

Her husband made a will on 21 November 1557 in her favour and when he died she inherited his goods, ironmongery business and lands in Bristol and Gloucestershire. He did leave a property in London to his brother but that was to go to Julian eventually. Julian could write but with a poor hand and bad spelling, but with her skills and her sons she managed the business.

She married again to Anthony Penn and when he died in 1572 he left all his goods to Julian. He also left a black gown to Michael, Clement and Baptist Hickes, his son Anthony Penn and another fifty black gowns for Julian to decide who had them. Julian was a friend of Richard Twedy of Boreham in Essex, who bequeathed his house to her in 1575.

In 1576 or 1577 she took stock of her assets noting that "from the first day of my birth I never deserved penny or piece of bread … God hath done it all, giving and taking". She included a large amount of good debts, her property "White Bear" at Cheapside and her current residence which she bought in 1559. In addition she had plate, jewels, tapestry, linen and furniture.

The poet and courtier Edward de Vere, 17th Earl of Oxford improved her financial prospects when he agreed to rent a room from her for £100 per year in 1591. However the Earl left without paying her but she had agreed beforehand that Thomas Churchyard would be his guarantor. She contacted him about the debt. She died in the following year.
