= Edward Ferrers (MP, will proved 1639) =

Edward Ferrers (c. 1573 – will proved 1639) was an English politician who sat in the House of Commons from 1610 to 1611.

Ferrers was the eldest son of Roger Ferrers of Fiddlington. In 1610, Ferrers was elected as the first Member of Parliament for Tewkesbury when it received its franchise.

Ferrers was the brother of William Ferrers (died 1625) who was a benefactor of the free grammar school.

Parliament of England
New constituency	Member of Parliament for Tewkesbury; 1610; With: Sir Dudley Digges	Succeeded by Sir Dudley Digges; Sir John Ratcliffe
