= Listed buildings in Chilham =

Historic structures in Kent, England

Chilham is a village and civil parish in the Borough of Ashford of Kent, England. It contains four grade I, one grade II* and 82 grade II listed buildings that are recorded in the National Heritage List for England.

This list is based on the information retrieved online from Historic England.

== Key ==
Grade	Criteria
I	Buildings that are of exceptional interest
II*	Particularly important buildings of more than special interest
II	Buildings that are of special interest

== Listing ==
Name	Grade	Location	Type	Completed (Note: The date given is the date used by Historic England as significant for the initial building or that of an important part in the structure's description.)	Date designated	Grid ref. (Note: The grid reference is based on the British national grid reference system, sometimes known as OSGB36, used by the Ordnance Survey.) Geo-coordinates	Notes	Entry number (Note: The "List Entry Number" is a unique number assigned to each listed building and scheduled monument by Historic England.)	Image	Wikidata
Barn 10 Yards West of Howlett's Farmhouse	II				13 August 1984	TR0499654124; 51°14′58″N 0°56′10″E		1299777	Upload Photo	Q26587141
Bridge Over Lake at Chilham Park	II				13 August 1984	TR0694653311; 51°14′29″N 0°57′48″E		1071305	Upload Photo	Q26326408
Chilham Castle	I	CT4 8DB			13 October 1952	TR0668753479; 51°14′35″N 0°57′35″E		1071304	Chilham Castle More images	Q5098912
Chilham Mills	II				4 March 1986	TR0774053369; 51°14′30″N 0°58′29″E		1234921	Upload Photo	Q26528291
Church of St Mary	I				27 November 1957	TR0688553656; 51°14′40″N 0°57′46″E		1071308	Church of St Mary More images	Q17529308
Elephant House	II				13 August 1984	TR0690753467; 51°14′34″N 0°57′47″E		1071306	Elephant House More images	Q26326409
Ha Ha to South of Chilham Castle	II				13 August 1984	TR0666053386; 51°14′32″N 0°57′34″E		1185181	Upload Photo	Q26480492
Sundial 20 Yards South West of Chilham Castle	II				13 August 1984	TR0668553434; 51°14′33″N 0°57′35″E		1071307	Upload Photo	Q26326411
Terraces to South of Chilham Castle	II				13 August 1984	TR0671453441; 51°14′34″N 0°57′37″E		1185185	Upload Photo	Q26480496
East Stour Farmhouse and Garden Wall	II	Ashford Road			13 August 1984	TR0753552098; 51°13′49″N 0°58′16″E		1362742	Upload Photo	Q26644612
Bagham Cottage	II	Canterbury Road, Bagham Cross			13 August 1984	TR0755953654; 51°14′39″N 0°58′21″E		1362743	Upload Photo	Q26644613
Bagham Farmhouse	II	Canterbury Road, Bagham Cross			13 August 1984	TR0771853687; 51°14′40″N 0°58′29″E		1071309	Upload Photo	Q26326412
Barn 25 Yards South of Bagham Farmhouse	II	Canterbury Road, Bagham Cross			13 August 1984	TR0771953637; 51°14′39″N 0°58′29″E		1185230	Upload Photo	Q26480544
Denmark House	II	Canterbury Road, Bagham Cross			13 August 1984	TR0754353650; 51°14′39″N 0°58′20″E		1185235	Upload Photo	Q26480547
Shalmsford Bridge Cottage	II	Canterbury Road			13 August 1984	TR0892554887; 51°15′17″N 0°59′34″E		1185225	Upload Photo	Q26480539
Chilham Castle Keep and Donkey Wheel	I	Chilham Castle			13 October 1952	TR0663553463; 51°14′34″N 0°57′33″E		1185170	Chilham Castle Keep and Donkey Wheel More images	Q17529345
2 and 3, Church Hill	II	2 and 3, Church Hill			13 August 1984	TR0682353655; 51°14′40″N 0°57′43″E		1071310	Upload Photo	Q26326414
Dane Street House	II	Dane Street			13 August 1984	TR0579552948; 51°14′19″N 0°56′48″E		1362744	Upload Photo	Q26644614
Tavern Cottage	II	4, Dane Street			27 November 1957	TR0577452906; 51°14′18″N 0°56′47″E		1185239	Upload Photo	Q26480552
Barn 25 Yards South of Denne Manor	II	Denne Manor Lane, Shottenden			13 August 1984	TR0428453312; 51°14′33″N 0°55′31″E		1071312	Upload Photo	Q26326418
Cock Farm House	II	Denne Manor Lane, Canterbury, CT4 8JH			27 November 1957	TR0435854187; 51°15′01″N 0°55′37″E		1071311	Upload Photo	Q26326416
Denne Manor	II	Denne Manor Lane, Shottenden			27 November 1957	TR0429953350; 51°14′34″N 0°55′32″E		1185258	Upload Photo	Q26480573
Wall to Chilham Castle Estate, from Gatehouse South	II	From Gatehouse South, School Hill			13 August 1984	TR0687553503; 51°14′35″N 0°57′45″E		1071286	Wall to Chilham Castle Estate, from Gatehouse South More images	Q26326375
K6 Telephone Kiosk	II	Herons Close			4 February 1992	TR0708953593; 51°14′38″N 0°57′56″E		1234948	Upload Photo	Q26528318
Burgoyne's	II	High Street			13 October 1952	TR0690653579; 51°14′38″N 0°57′47″E		1185317	Upload Photo	Q26480634
Churchyard Wall from the Olde Cottage 20 Yards to Bakery House	II	High Street			13 August 1984	TR0687353599; 51°14′39″N 0°57′45″E		1362745	Upload Photo	Q26644615
Clovers	II	High Street			27 November 1957	TR0686153598; 51°14′39″N 0°57′45″E		1185325	Upload Photo	Q26480644
Crea House	II	High Street			13 October 1952	TR0689253579; 51°14′38″N 0°57′46″E		1071276	Upload Photo	Q26326354
Forge House and Bookshop	II	High Street			13 October 1952	TR0701753578; 51°14′38″N 0°57′53″E		1362767	Upload Photo	Q26644636
Hatfield House Hatfield Lodge	II	High Street			13 October 1952	TR0712953575; 51°14′37″N 0°57′58″E		1362766	Upload Photo	Q26644635
The Olde Cottage	II	High Street			13 August 1984	TR0686753607; 51°14′39″N 0°57′45″E		1299759	Upload Photo	Q26587125
Barn 30 Yards West of Cork Farmhouse	II	Long Hill, Old Wives Lees			13 August 1984	TR0705754627; 51°15′12″N 0°57′57″E		1185336	Upload Photo	Q26480653
Cork Farmhouse	II	Long Hill, Old Wives Lees			27 November 1957	TR0708554614; 51°15′11″N 0°57′58″E		1071277	Upload Photo	Q26326356
Lower Ensden Farmhouse	II	Lower Ensden Road, Old Wives Lees			13 August 1984	TR0743955699; 51°15′46″N 0°58′19″E		1362729	Upload Photo	Q26644600
Oasts and Oasthouse 50 Yards East of Lower Ensden Farmhouse	II	Lower Ensden Road, Old Wives Lees			13 August 1984	TR0753755628; 51°15′43″N 0°58′24″E		1071278	Upload Photo	Q26326358
Barn 50 Yards West of North Court Farmhouse	II	Lower Lees, Old Wives Lees			13 August 1984	TR0748655029; 51°15′24″N 0°58′20″E		1362730	Upload Photo	Q26644601
Garden Cottages	II	1-4, Lower Lees, Old Wives Lees			30 October 1974	TR0767954917; 51°15′20″N 0°58′30″E		1299690	Upload Photo	Q26587064
Barn 15 Yards South of Young Manor	II	Maidstone Road			13 August 1984	TR0532152722; 51°14′12″N 0°56′24″E		1071280	Upload Photo	Q26326364
Dane Court	II	Maidstone Road			27 November 1957	TR0568853125; 51°14′25″N 0°56′43″E		1071279	Upload Photo	Q26326361
Village Hall	II	Maidstone Road			13 August 1984	TR0648953609; 51°14′39″N 0°57′26″E		1299698	Upload Photo	Q26587071
Young Manor Farmhouse	II	Maidstone Road			27 November 1957	TR0529952753; 51°14′13″N 0°56′22″E		1185384	Upload Photo	Q26480701
April Cottage	II	9, Mountain Street			13 August 1984	TR0690152774; 51°14′12″N 0°57′45″E		1185419	Upload Photo	Q26480732
Heron Manor Monkton Cottage	II	Mountain Street			13 August 1984	TR0687352909; 51°14′16″N 0°57′44″E		1071281	Heron Manor Monkton Cottage More images	Q26326366
Hurst Farmhouse	I	Mountain Street			27 November 1957	TR0665951824; 51°13′41″N 0°57′31″E		1071283	Hurst Farmhouse More images	Q17529302
Monkton Manor	II	6, Mountain Street			27 November 1957	TR0688452801; 51°14′13″N 0°57′44″E		1071282	Monkton Manor More images	Q26326368
Pilgrims	II	Mulberry Hill			13 August 1984	TR0751053780; 51°14′44″N 0°58′18″E		1185420	Upload Photo	Q26480733
Little Belke	II	School Hill			13 August 1984	TR0684153557; 51°14′37″N 0°57′44″E		1071284	Upload Photo	Q26326369
St Mary's Church of England Primary School - Old Schoolmaster's House	II	School Hill			13 August 1984	TR0687753537; 51°14′37″N 0°57′45″E		1071285	Upload Photo	Q26326372
St Mary's Church of England Primary School and Wall to North	II	School Hill			13 August 1984	TR0687553528; 51°14′36″N 0°57′45″E		1366080	St Mary's Church of England Primary School and Wall to North More images	Q26647712
The School Canteen	II	School Hill			13 August 1984	TR0685553551; 51°14′37″N 0°57′44″E		1299674	Upload Photo	Q26587048
Barn, 20 Yards North of Upper Ensign House	II	20 Yards North Of Upper Ensign House, Selling Road, Old Wives Lees			13 August 1984	TR0672055975; 51°15′56″N 0°57′42″E		1366083	Upload Photo	Q26647715
Grove Cottages	II	Selling Road, Old Wives Lees			13 August 1984	TR0654755673; 51°15′46″N 0°57′33″E		1071287	Upload Photo	Q26326376
Phyllis Farmhouse	II	Selling Road, Old Wives Lees			13 August 1984	TR0701555245; 51°15′32″N 0°57′56″E		1299650	Upload Photo	Q26587026
Upper Ensign House	II	Selling Road, Old Wives Lees			13 August 1984	TR0673155945; 51°15′55″N 0°57′43″E		1362731	Upload Photo	Q26644602
Former Barn 25 Yards South West of Matthews Farmhouse	II	Shottenden Road, CT4 8JA, Shottenden			13 August 1984	TR0405554111; 51°14′59″N 0°55′21″E		1362732	Upload Photo	Q26644603
Hares Farmhouse	II	Shottenden Road, Shottenden			13 August 1984	TR0434654217; 51°15′02″N 0°55′36″E		1071288	Upload Photo	Q26326379
Matthew Farmhouse	II	Shottenden Road, Shottenden			13 August 1984	TR0406354153; 51°15′00″N 0°55′22″E		1185515	Upload Photo	Q26480831
Myrtle House	II	Stonestile Lane, Shottenden			27 November 1957	TR0457254342; 51°15′06″N 0°55′48″E		1362755	Upload Photo	Q26644625
Boundary Wall of Chilham Castle from Gatehouse North 50 Yards to Well Cottage	II	Taylors Hill			13 August 1984	TR0677853589; 51°14′38″N 0°57′40″E		1071253	Upload Photo	Q26326303
Fern Cottage	II	Taylors Hill			13 October 1952	TR0678153611; 51°14′39″N 0°57′41″E		1362757	Upload Photo	Q26644627
Thompsons House	II	Taylors Hill			13 August 1984	TR0676653611; 51°14′39″N 0°57′40″E		1071254	Upload Photo	Q26326305
Vergers Lodge	II	Taylors Hill			13 October 1952	TR0677453611; 51°14′39″N 0°57′40″E		1071255	Upload Photo	Q26326307
Well Cottage	II	Taylors Hill			13 October 1952	TR0677053599; 51°14′39″N 0°57′40″E		1362756	Upload Photo	Q26644626
5 and 6, the Square	II	5 and 6, The Square			13 October 1952	TR0682053619; 51°14′39″N 0°57′43″E		1185547	5 and 6, the Square More images	Q26480865
Belke House	II	The Square			13 October 1952	TR0682653568; 51°14′38″N 0°57′43″E		1071250	Upload Photo	Q26326298
Chantry Cottage	II	The Square			13 October 1952	TR0685353600; 51°14′39″N 0°57′44″E		1071291	Chantry Cottage More images	Q26326386
Chilham Antiques	II	4, The Square			13 October 1952	TR0681253613; 51°14′39″N 0°57′42″E		1071290	Chilham Antiques More images	Q26326383
Chilham War Memorial	II	The Square, Canterbury			15 April 2015	TR0685353634; 51°14′40″N 0°57′44″E		1426105	Chilham War Memorial More images	Q26677258
Chrisholme	II	The Square			13 October 1952	TR0683053576; 51°14′38″N 0°57′43″E		1185566	Upload Photo	Q26480886
Clements Cottage	II	The Square			13 October 1952	TR0685253614; 51°14′39″N 0°57′44″E		1071289	Clements Cottage More images	Q26326382
Gate Houses and Gateway to Chilham Castle	II	The Square			13 August 1984	TR0679053577; 51°14′38″N 0°57′41″E		1362754	Gate Houses and Gateway to Chilham Castle More images	Q26644624
Haddon Cottage	II	3, The Square			13 October 1952	TR0680453610; 51°14′39″N 0°57′42″E		1299624	Haddon Cottage More images	Q26587004
Orion's Cottage	II	The Square			13 October 1952	TR0679253609; 51°14′39″N 0°57′41″E		1071251	Orion's Cottage More images	Q26326301
Peacock Antiques Tudor Lodge Gift Shop	II	The Square			13 October 1952	TR0684453589; 51°14′38″N 0°57′44″E		1362734	Peacock Antiques Tudor Lodge Gift Shop More images	Q26644605
The Church Mouse	II	2, The Square, Canterbury, CT4 8BY			13 October 1952	TR0679753608; 51°14′39″N 0°57′41″E		1362733	The Church Mouse More images	Q26644604
The Smithy Tudor Cottage	II	The Square			13 October 1952	TR0684953595; 51°14′38″N 0°57′44″E		1185556	The Smithy Tudor Cottage More images	Q26480874
The Vicarage	II*	The Square			13 October 1952	TR0694253682; 51°14′41″N 0°57′49″E		1071252	The Vicarage More images	Q17556173
The White Horse	II	The Square			13 October 1952	TR0683553624; 51°14′39″N 0°57′43″E		1299622	The White Horse More images	Q26587002
Bakery House and Evern House	II	The Street, CT4 8BX			13 August 1984	TR0688853597; 51°14′38″N 0°57′46″E		1362764	Upload Photo	Q26644633
Clifton Cottage	II	The Street, CT4 8BX			13 October 1952	TR0690653594; 51°14′38″N 0°57′47″E		1071271	Upload Photo	Q26326343
Cumberland Cottage	II	The Street, CT4 8BX			13 October 1952	TR0694953595; 51°14′38″N 0°57′49″E		1071272	Upload Photo	Q26326346
Cumberland House	II	The Street, CT4 8BX			13 October 1952	TR0692353595; 51°14′38″N 0°57′48″E		1362765	Upload Photo	Q26644634
The Old Coach House	II	The Street, CT4 8DN			13 October 1952	TR0707053595; 51°14′38″N 0°57′55″E		1071273	Upload Photo	Q26326347
Thydon Cottage	II	The Street, CT4 8BX			13 October 1952	TR0692353580; 51°14′38″N 0°57′48″E		1362728	Upload Photo	Q26644599
Wisteria House	II	The Street, CT4 8BX			13 October 1952	TR0693353578; 51°14′38″N 0°57′48″E		1071275	Upload Photo	Q26326352
Woolpack Inn	II	The Street, CT4 8DL			13 October 1952	TR0706953573; 51°14′37″N 0°57′55″E		1071274	Woolpack Inn More images	Q26326350

== See also ==
- Grade I listed buildings in Kent
- Grade II* listed buildings in Kent

== Sources ==
- Newman, John (2012) [1969], Kent: West and the Weald, The Buildings of England, New Haven and London: Yale University Press, ISBN 978-0-300-18509-6
