= Dudley Digges =

English diplomat and politician (1583–1639)

Sir Dudley Digges
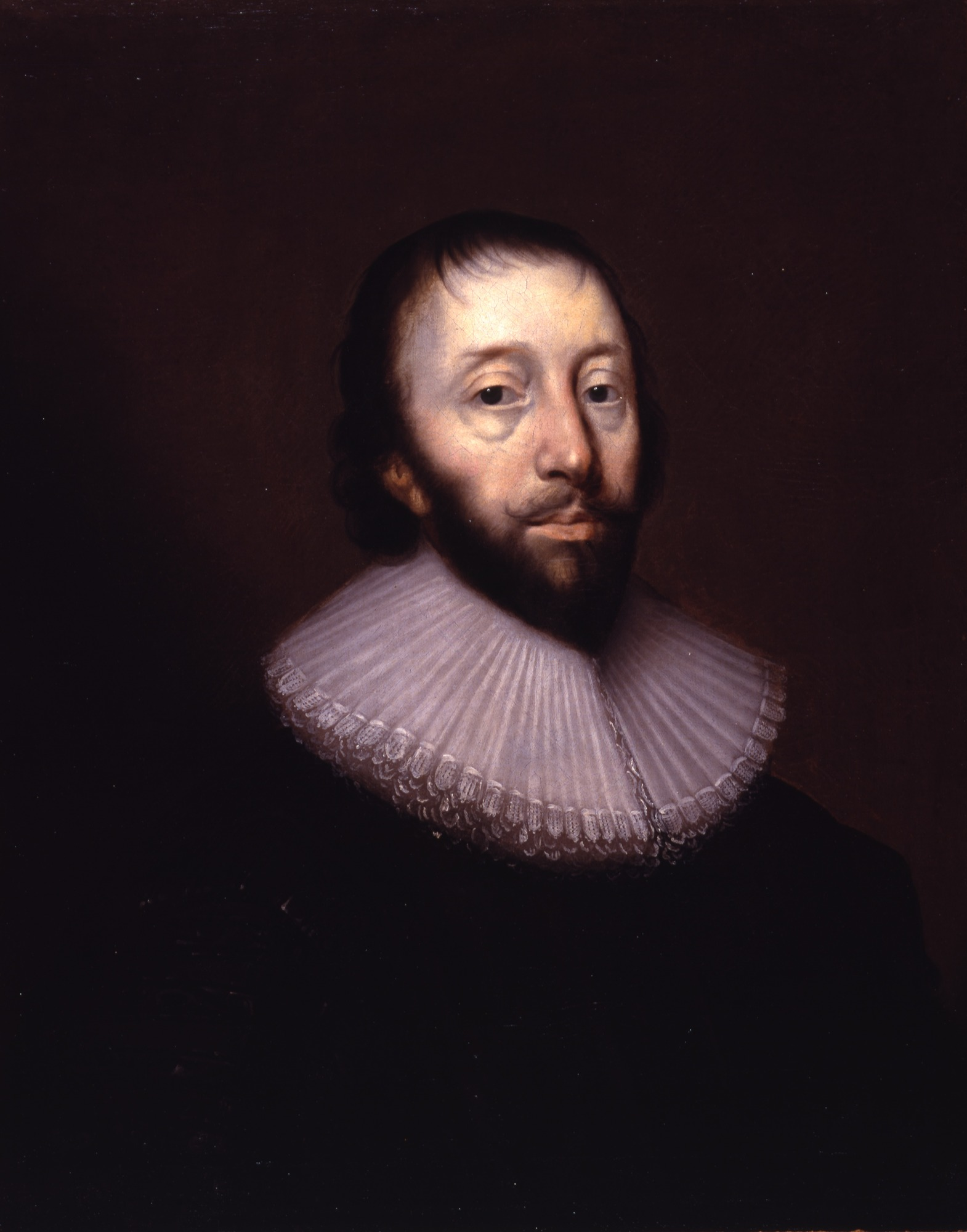

Member of Parliament for Tewkesbury

Member of Parliament for Kent
- In office 1610–1626
- Preceded by: Constituency established
- Succeeded by: Sir Baptist Hicks; Sir Thomas Colepeper
- In office 1628–1629
- Preceded by: Sir Edward Hales; Sir Edward Scot
- Succeeded by: Personal Rule

Personal details
- Born: 19 May 1583
- Died: 18 March 1639 (aged 55)
- Spouse: Mary Kempe
- Children: Edward Digges
- Parent(s): Thomas Digges; Anne St Leger

Sir Dudley Digges (b. May 19, 1583 – d. March 18, 1639) was an English diplomat and politician who represented Tewkesbury and Kent in the House of Commons of England between 1610 and 1629. Digges was also a "Virginia adventurer," an investor who ventured his capital in the Virginia Company of London; his son Edward Digges would go on to be Governor of Virginia. Dudley Digges was responsible for the rebuilding of Chilham Castle, completed in around 1616.

== Early life ==
Digges was the son of the mathematician Thomas Digges of Digges Court, Barham, Kent, and Anne St Leger (d. 1636), the daughter of Warham St Leger. Dudley matriculated at University College, Oxford on 18 July 1600, when aged 17, and was awarded BA on 1 July 1601.

== Career in politics ==
Digges was knighted by James I at Whitehall on 29 April 1607. In 1610, he was elected Member of Parliament for the newly enfranchised constituency of Tewkesbury.

He was a friend of Henry Hudson and, in 1610, he was one of those who fitted out Hudson for his last voyage. As a result, Digges' name was given to Digges Islands, at the mouth of Hudson Bay in Canada, and to Cape Digges, at the easternmost extremity of these islands. In 1614, Digges was re-elected MP for Tewkesbury to the Addled Parliament. He backed the explorations of William Baffin in 1615 and 1616, with several of the same group of "adventurers". In 1616 he completed his mansion of Chilham Castle, Kent, on land inherited from his father-in-law.

Digges became a gentleman of the privy chamber in 1618. He was named ambassador to Muscovy in 1618–1619 and Special Ambassador to Holland in 1620. He was re-elected MP for Tewkesbury in 1621, 1624, 1625, and 1626. In the latter parliament, he was active in the impeachment of the Duke of Buckingham during the crisis of 1626 that followed the aborted expedition to Cádiz, when Digges and Archbishop Abbot co-operated to co-ordinate the attacks in the Houses of Lords and Commons. Digges was for a time imprisoned in the Fleet Prison by order of the King, but was released on apologizing to the King, an act that John Eliot was unwilling to perform. In 1628, Digges was elected MP for Kent and sat until 1629 when King Charles decided to rule without parliament for eleven years.

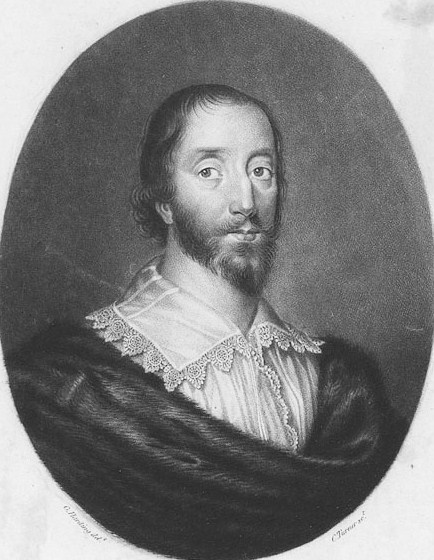
Sir Dudley Digges

In 1631, Digges became a bencher of Gray's Inn and was master in chancery from 1631 to 1637.

That same year (1631), he was one of the commission appointed by the Privy Council "to consider how the plantation of Virginia now standeth, and to consider what commodity may be raised in those parts," and in 1634, he was appointed Commissioner for Virginia Tobacco. In 1638, he was appointed Master of the Rolls until his death in 1639.

== Published work ==
Digges published several political and economic works, The Worthiness of Warre and Warriors (1604), The Defence of Trade (1615), Rights and Privileges of the Subject (1642), and, posthumously, The Compleat Ambassador: or Two Treaties of the Intended Marriage of Qu. Elizabeth of Glorious Memory (1655), a notable study of the two French marriage embassies, of Anjou and of Alençon, which revealed in unprecedented fashion the official despatches and correspondence and is a landmark in English historiography.

Digges left a fund in his will that provided, for some 200 years after his death, an annuity of £20 as prize money for races between the men and women of the parish of Chilham, Kent.

== Family ==
Coat of Arms of Dudley Digges

Digges married Mary Kempe, daughter and co-heir of Sir Thomas Kempe of Olantigh, Kent. They had eight sons and three daughters. Digges's son Edward was among the "planters," who emigrated in the 1640s and became Governor of Virginia. Another son, Dudley (c. 1612–1643) published a treatise on the Illegality of Subjects taking up Arms against their Sovereigns (1643). Sir Dudley Digges and Lady Mary Kemp had 11 children, 8 boys and 3 girls, of who 8 survived to adulthood:

- Thomas Digges (b. 1603)
- Ann Digges (b. 1616)
- Elizabeth Digges (b. 1617)
- Francis Digges (b. 1619)
- Edward Digges (1621–1675), a barrister and colonist who served as Colonial Governor of Virginia from March 1655 to December 1656. Edward Digges' grandson Dudley Digges (patriot) (c. 1728 – 1790), served in the House of Burgesses from 1752 until the Revolutionary War. This Dudley Digges was a member of the Committee of Safety established by the Virginia Conventions to act in the absence of the royal governor, he would become a lieutenant governor of Virginia and was one of the members of the Virginia Assembly captured by the British in a Charlottesville raid in 1781.
- Leonard Digges (b. 1622)
- Herbert Digges (b. 1628)
- Richard Digges (b. 1635)

== See also ==
- Diggs baronets

== Footnotes ==
Parliament of England
New constituency	Member of Parliament for Tewkesbury; 1610–1626; With: Edward Ferrers 1610–1611; Sir John Ratcliffe 1614; Giles Brydges 1621–1622; Sir Baptist Hicks 1624–1626	Succeeded by Sir Baptist Hicks; Sir Thomas Colepeper
Preceded by Sir Edward Hales; Sir Edward Scot	Member of Parliament for Kent; 1628–1629; With: Thomas Finch	Parliament suspended until 1640
