= Michael Hicks (courtier) =

English courtier and politician

- Born: 21 October 1543
- Died: 15 August 1612 (aged 68); Ruckholt, Leyton, Essex
- Resting place: St Mary's Church, Leyton
- Education: Trinity College, Cambridge
- Occupations: Aristocrat, merchant, politician
- Spouse: Elizabeth Colston
- Children: Sir William Hicks, 1st Baronet
- Mother: Julian Penn
- Relatives: Baptist Hicks, 1st Viscount Campden (brother)

Sir Michael Hicks (21 October 1543 – 15 August 1612) was an English courtier and politician who was secretary to Lord Burghley during the reign of Queen Elizabeth I.

== Early life ==
Michael Hicks (or Hickes) born 21 October 1543, was the eldest son of Robert Hicks of Bristol, Gloucestershire, at one time a London merchant. His mother was Julian (or Juliana), daughter and heiress of William Arthur of Somerset. His younger brother, Baptist, was created Viscount Campden. Michael matriculated at Trinity College, Cambridge, in 1559 and was admitted to Lincoln's Inn in 1564.

== Career ==
Joining the household of Sir William Cecil, the future Lord Burghley, he rose to become one of Burghley's two principal secretaries at the time he was the Queen's chief minister. Taking the same position with Sir Robert Cecil after Burghley's death, Hicks became an influential figure at court and appears to have been popular. Kimber & Johnson (1771) state that he "by his ingenious education and good parts, became very polite and agreeable and was admitted into a society of learned and eminent persons, having the accomplishment of a facetious wit to recommend him", but also that "many persons, knowing what interest he had with Sir Robert ... made him their friend, at any rate, to solicit their causes with him, who was ever... ready to gratify Sir Michael, especially where the benefit was likely to accrue to him".

Hicks appeared to have possessed considerable financial abilities, and his personal friends sought his aid and counsel in their pecuniary difficulties. He lent Francis Bacon money in 1593, and between that year and 1608 Bacon sent him several appeals for further loans. Hicks proved a very friendly creditor. Bacon invariably wrote to him in amicable terms and urged him to preserve good relations between himself and Sir Robert Cecil. To Fulke Greville, another friend, Hicks also rendered similar services. He became wealthy enough to purchase two estates, Beverstone in Gloucestershire and Ruckholt in Leyton, Essex. The latter, which he acquired of a stepson by 1597, he made his chief home.

In August 1597, Hicks was anticipating a visit by Elizabeth I to his house at Ruckholt in Essex. Henry Maynard, another of Burghley's secretaries, advised him to have his wife give the queen a gift of a fine waistcoat or ruff. Hicks's house at Ruckholt was demolished in 1757.

In June 1604, he was granted the site and demesne of the priory of Lenton, Nottinghamshire. On 16 June 1604, Hicks entertained James I at Ruckholt, and on 6 August the king knighted him at Theobalds. He died at Ruckholt on 15 August 1612 and was buried in the chancel of the neighbouring church of Leyton, where an elaborate monument in alabaster, with recumbent figures of himself (in full armour) and of his widow, was erected to his memory.

Hicks was an MP in every Parliament but one between 1585 and his death, representing Truro (1584), Shaftesbury (1588–89 and 1593), Gatton (1597–98) and Horsham (1601 and 1604–1611).

On 17 May 1603, Hicks became Receiver-General for the county of Middlesex but seems to have surrendered the post on 12 July 1604. According to Wotton, Hicks "was well skilled in philological learning, and had read over the polite Roman historians and moralists; out of which authors he made large collections, especially of the moral and wise sentences out of which he filled divers paper-books, remaining in the family".

Historian A. L. Rowse describes Hicks as a supporter of the Puritans and suggests he was the author (who to this day has not been conclusively identified) of the Marprelate Tracts. Rowse's view is based on the observation that the tracts were "clearly written by someone in a position to know everybody who was anybody" and the opinion that Hicks had a "merry, facetious pen". However, Rowse himself admits that the secret of the author's identity "seems lost forever".

== Personal life and death ==
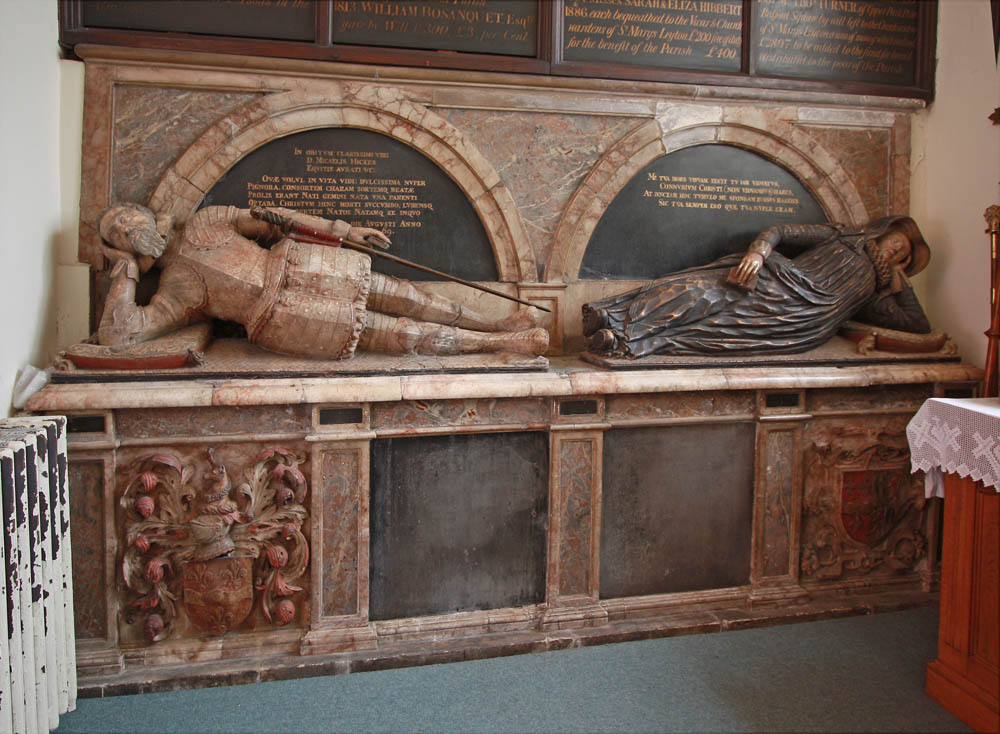
Monument at St Mary's Church, Leyton

In 1597, Hicks married Elizabeth Colston of Forest House, widow of Henry Pervis or Parvish (said to be an Italian merchant) of Ruckholt. Their eldest son, William (1596–1680), was created a baronet in 1619. He also served as a member of parliament and was later imprisoned during the Civil War for his Royalist loyalties. The Earls St Aldwyn were his descendants.

Their daughter Elizabeth Hicks married Sir William Armine, 1st Baronet, and had issue.

Their daughter Sarah Hicks married Nathaniel Jeffries and had issue.

Hicks died at Ruckholt on 15 August 1612 of a "burning ague". It was said his illness was caused by swimming during the hot summer. He was buried at St Mary's Church, Leyton, where his sculptural monument survives, depicting him and his wife as semi-reclining figures.
