= Mary Davis (artist) =

British painter (1866–1941)

- Born: Mary Halford; 22 March 1866; London, England
- Died: 30 October 1941 (aged 75); Romsey, Hampshire, England
- Education: Ridley Art School
- Known for: Painting
- Title: Lady Davis
- Spouse: Sir Edmund Davis (m. 1889–1939, his death)

Mary Davis, Lady Davis (née Halford; 22 March 1866 – 30 October 1941) was a British artist known as a designer and painter of fans.

== Biography ==
Davis was born in London and studied art at the Ridley Art School. She exhibited landscape paintings and painted fans at the Royal Academy in London from 1886 onwards and at the Paris Salon from 1898.

In 1914 Davis had a joint exhibition with Charles Conder, another noted fan artist of the time, in New York at the Colnaghi & Obach gallery. In 1919, Davis shared an exhibition, entitled Pictures, Portraits, Fans and Frivolities, with Laura Anning Bell and Constance Rea at the Fine Art Society in London.

Davis also exhibited at the Leicester Galleries, the Grosvenor Gallery and with both the Royal Institute of Oil Painters and the International Society of Sculptors, Painters and Gravers. The Tate holds an example of her painted fans.

In 1889, she had married Edmund Davis, who was knighted in 1927. Edmund Davis had made a fortune from mining in South Africa and when he settled in London, the couple began assembling a substantial art collection that included paintings by Old Masters, such as Canaletto and Rembrandt, plus more contemporary artists including Whistler. The collection was exhibited to the public at the French Gallery in 1915. Five old-master paintings were stolen from their collection in 1938.

The couple also commissioned artists, including Charles Conder, to decorate their Holland Park home and also Chilham Castle, which they owned until after Edmund's death in 1939. In due course, the Davises donated works from their art collection to the Iziko South African National Gallery and to the Musée du Luxembourg in Paris. They also donated some items to the Tate collection.
