= Chilham Castle =

Manor house and keep in Kent, England

- Chilham, Kent, England
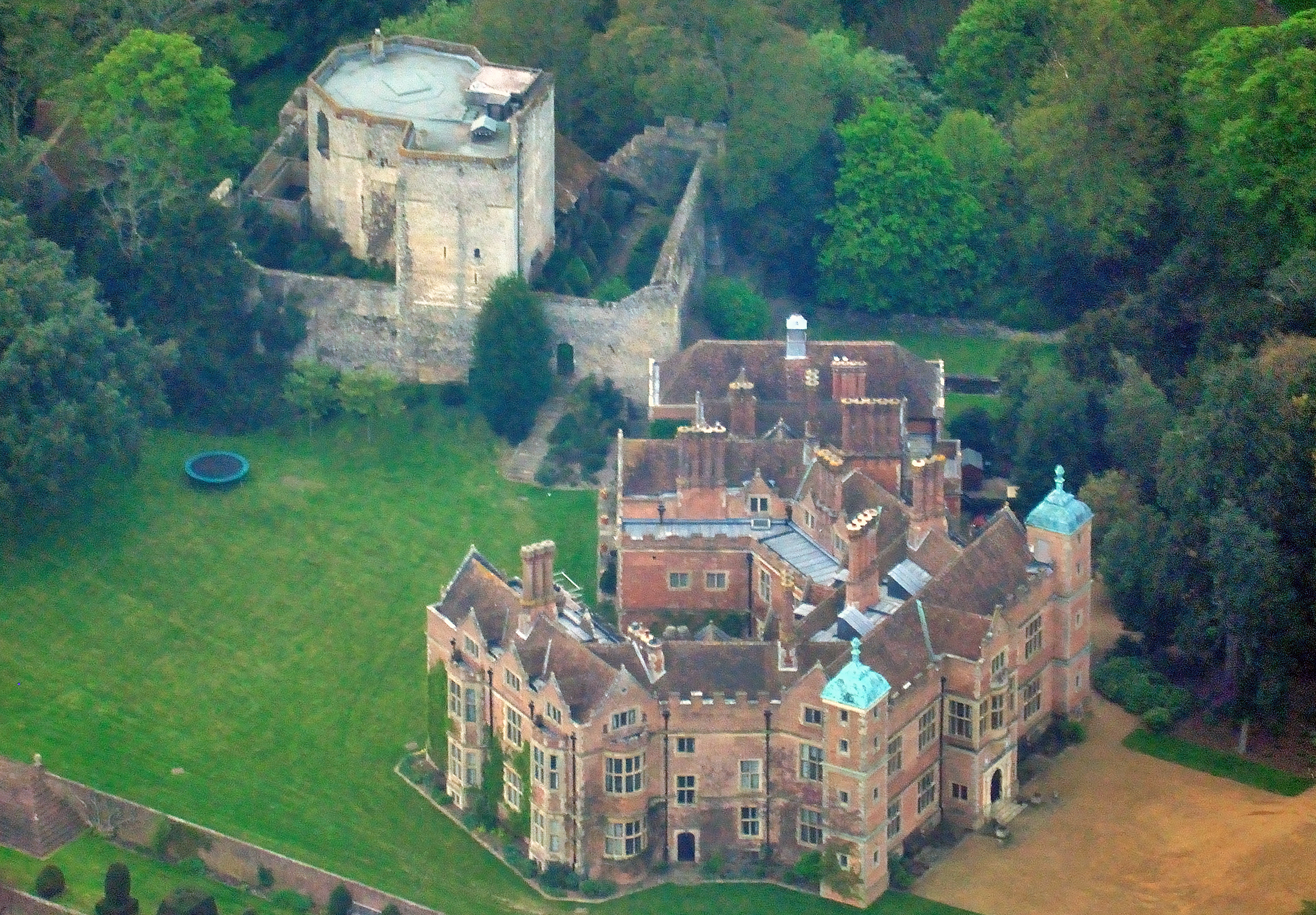

Site information
- Type: Manor house and keep
- Controlled by: Historic England
- Condition: Excellent

Location
- Location in Kent
- Location within Kent
- Coordinates: 51.243°N 0.960°E

Site history
- Built: 1612–1616
- Built by: Sir Dudley Digges
- In use: Private Residence
- Materials: Brick and Stone

Chilham Castle is a Jacobean manor house and keep in the village of Chilham, between Ashford and Canterbury in the county of Kent, England. The keep is of Norman origin and dates to 1174, although it may have been built on an older Anglo-Saxon fortification. The manor house was completed in 1616 for Sir Dudley Digges. Various renovations and improvements to the Manor House and surrounding gardens took place in the 18th and 19th centuries.

== History ==
The polygonal keep of the Norman Castle, the oldest building in the village, dates from 1174 and is still inhabited today, making it one of the oldest dwellings in Great Britain. It was said to have been built for King Henry II, although archaeological excavations carried out in the 1920s suggest that it stands on the foundations of a much older Anglo-Saxon fortification, possibly dating from the seventh century. In June 1320, Chilham Castle was the venue for a reception hosted by Bartholomew de Badlesmere for Edward II and his entourage when they were travelling through Dover en route for France.

The Jacobean building, within sight of the keep, was completed in 1616 for Sir Dudley Digges on a hexagonal plan, with five angled ranges and the sixth left open. It has battlemented parapets, clustered facetted columnar brick chimneys and corner towers with squared ogee cappings.

The Victorian tradition that this house was designed by Inigo Jones is not credited by architectural historians. Indeed, Nicholas Stone, a master mason who had worked under Jones's direction at Holyrood Palace in 1616, and at the Whitehall Banqueting House, was commissioned to add a funerary chapel to Chilham Church for Dudley Digges to contain Stone's funerary monument to Lady Digges in the early 1630s. If any traces of Jones were discernible at Chilham Castle, Nicholas Stone might be considered as a candidate. It is, nevertheless, one of the finer mansions in the south-east of England and commands exceptional views across the valley of the River Stour, Kent.

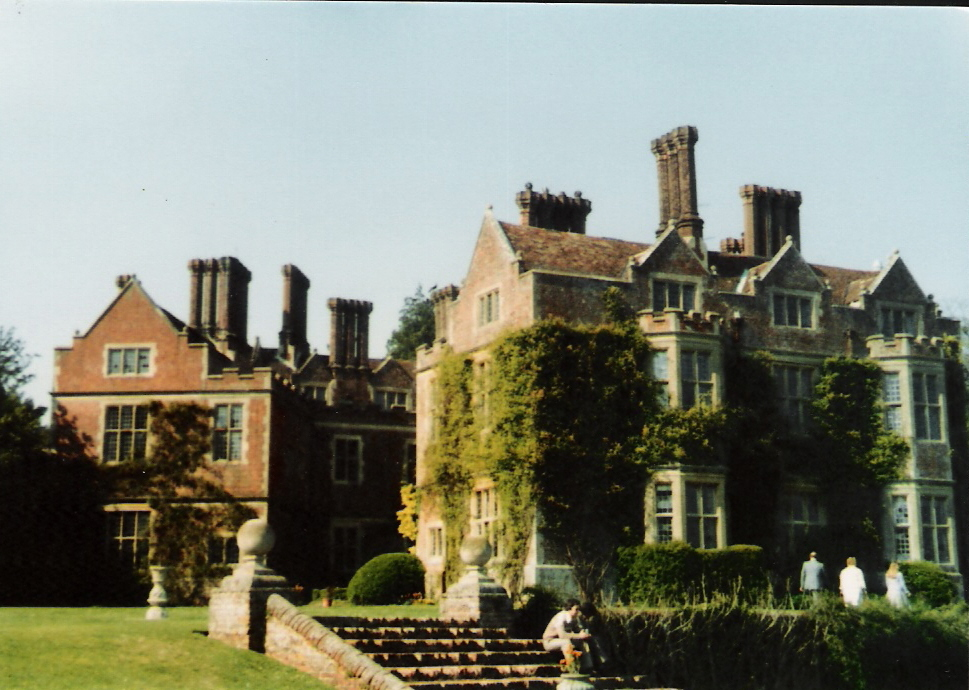
Chilham Castle: the open rear range of the hexagonal plan, open to lawn and terraces

The gardens, originally thought to have been laid out by John Tradescant the Elder, were redesigned twice in the 18th century. First, under the London banker James Colebrooke, (who bought the estate from the Digges family) fine vistas were created stretching to the river and then under Thomas Heron (who acquired the estate from Colebrooke's son Robert), Capability Brown made further recommendations for change, some of which were implemented.

Chilham Castle was purchased by James Wildman in 1794 and in 1816 was inherited by his son James Beckford Wildman, who sold it in 1861 because of falling income after emancipation of the slaves on the family estates in the West Indies. Plans of Chilham showing some of the substantial changes made to the building by David Brandon for Charles Hardy in 1862 and by Herbert Baker for mining magnate Sir Edmund and Lady Davis in the early 1920s are conserved in the Victoria and Albert Museum. Sir Edmund and Lady Davis were serious art collectors. Five of their old-master paintings were stolen from the castle in 1938.

The present terracing, altered in the 18th and 19th centuries, leads down to a fishing lake dating from the time of Charles Hardy's son Charles Stewart Hardy in the 1860s. The walls to the grounds date mostly from the 18th century, although the two gatehouses were only added in the early 1920s, again replacing a very different 19th-century one.

In the 1920s, The Keep was the country residence of the well-known British painters and art collectors Charles Ricketts and Charles Haslewood Shannon.

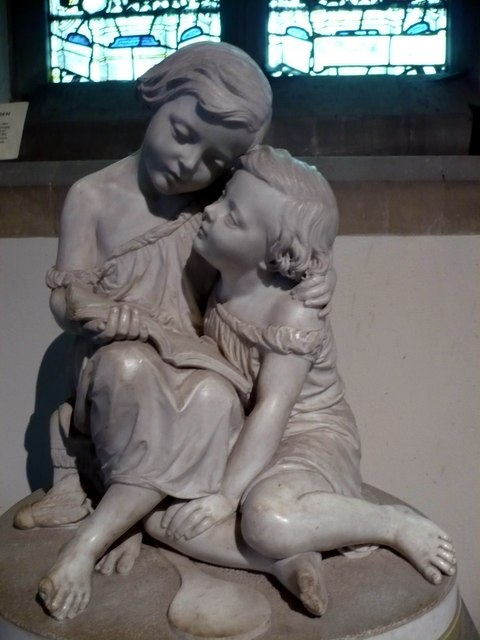
The Hardy Children, monument in St. Mary's church. The book shows an illustration from Babes in the Wood

From 1949 until his death in 1992, it was owned by the 13th Viscount Massereene. Chilham Castle was owned by the financier and UKIP activist Stuart Wheeler, who lived there with his three daughters, Sarah, Jacquetta, and Charlotte until his death in 2020. Stuart's wife died in 2016.

The site now hosts the Chilham Park Equestrian Centre.

On April 13, 2021, the castle was put up for sale for £15 million.

== In popular culture ==
In 1965, Chilham Castle was used for part of the filming of The Amorous Adventures of Moll Flanders starring Kim Novak, Leo McKern and Angela Lansbury. In 1985, the site featured in an episode of 1980s police drama Dempsey & Makepeace as Makepeace's family home. The episode was titled 'Cry God For Harry' and most of the hour-long episode was filmed in the castle and its grounds. In 1989, it also featured in the first episode of the ITV adventure game show Interceptor produced by Chatsworth Television who were responsible for the earlier Treasure Hunt series. A medieval joust was being held there and a contestant was required to take part to progress further in the show.

In 1994, the castle featured in an episode of Agatha Christie's Poirot (ITV), as Simeon Lee's manor house Gorston Hall. It was also used in the 2006 TV episode, The Moving Finger (part of Agatha Christie's Marple) as the magnificent home of Cardew Pye. The rest of the village also features in the film.

The castle has also featured in productions such as Hercule Poirot's Christmas, Married... with Children season 6, and the drama series Moon and Son.

== See also ==
- Castles in Great Britain and Ireland
- List of castles in England
