= Thomas Mantell (antiquary) =

English antiquarian

- Born: 1751
- Died: 1831 (aged 79–80)
- Occupation: Antiquarian

Sir Thomas Mantell (1751–1831) was an English antiquarian.

== Biography ==
Mantell was the only son of Thomas Mantell, surgeon, of Chilham, Kent, by Catharine, daughter of John Nichols, rector of Fordwich. He belonged to the Kentish branch of the Mantells. Pegge the antiquary was his godfather. Early in life, he settled at Dover in his father's profession, but retired after being appointed agent for prisoners of war and transports at Dover. In 1814, he was appointed agent for packets at Dover, a post at that time demanding unremitting attention. He was for many years a magistrate at Dover, and six times its mayor. He was knighted on 13 May 1820 during his mayoralty. He died at his house in Dover on 21 December 1831, aged 80, and was buried in the family vault at Chilham. He married Anne, daughter of William Oakley, but left no family.

Mantell was elected fellow of the Society of Antiquaries in 1810. He investigated the tumuli in various parts of Kent, and was a collector of antiquities. His publications were: 1. 'Short Directions for the Management of Infants,' 1787. 2. 'Case of Imperforate Anus successfully treated' in 'Memoirs of Medicine,' vol. iii. 1792. 3. 'An Account of Cinque Ports Meetings, called Brotherhoods and Guestlings,' Dover, 1811, 4to.; reissued with additions as 'Cinque Ports, Brotherhoods, and Guestlings,' Dover, 1828, 4to. 4. 'Coronation Ceremonies . . . relative to the Barons of the Cinque Ports,' &c., Dover, 1820, 4to.
