= Hicks baronets =

Title in the Baronetage of England

There have been two baronetcies created for persons with the surname Hicks, both in the Baronetage of England. One creation is extant as of 2008.

The Hicks, later Hicks Beach Baronetcy, of Beverston in the County of Gloucester, was created in the Baronetage of England on 21 July 1619. For more information on this creation, see the Earl St Aldwyn.

The Hicks, later Noel Baronetcy, of Campden in the County of Gloucester, was created in the Baronetage of England on 1 July 1620. For more information on this creation, see the Earl of Gainsborough.

== Hicks, later Hicks Beach baronets, of Beverston (1619) ==
- see the Earl St Aldwyn

== Hicks, later Noel baronets, of Campden (1620) ==
- see the Earl of Gainsborough
