= Sir William Hicks, 1st Baronet =

English Member of Parliament

Sir William Hicks Bt MP
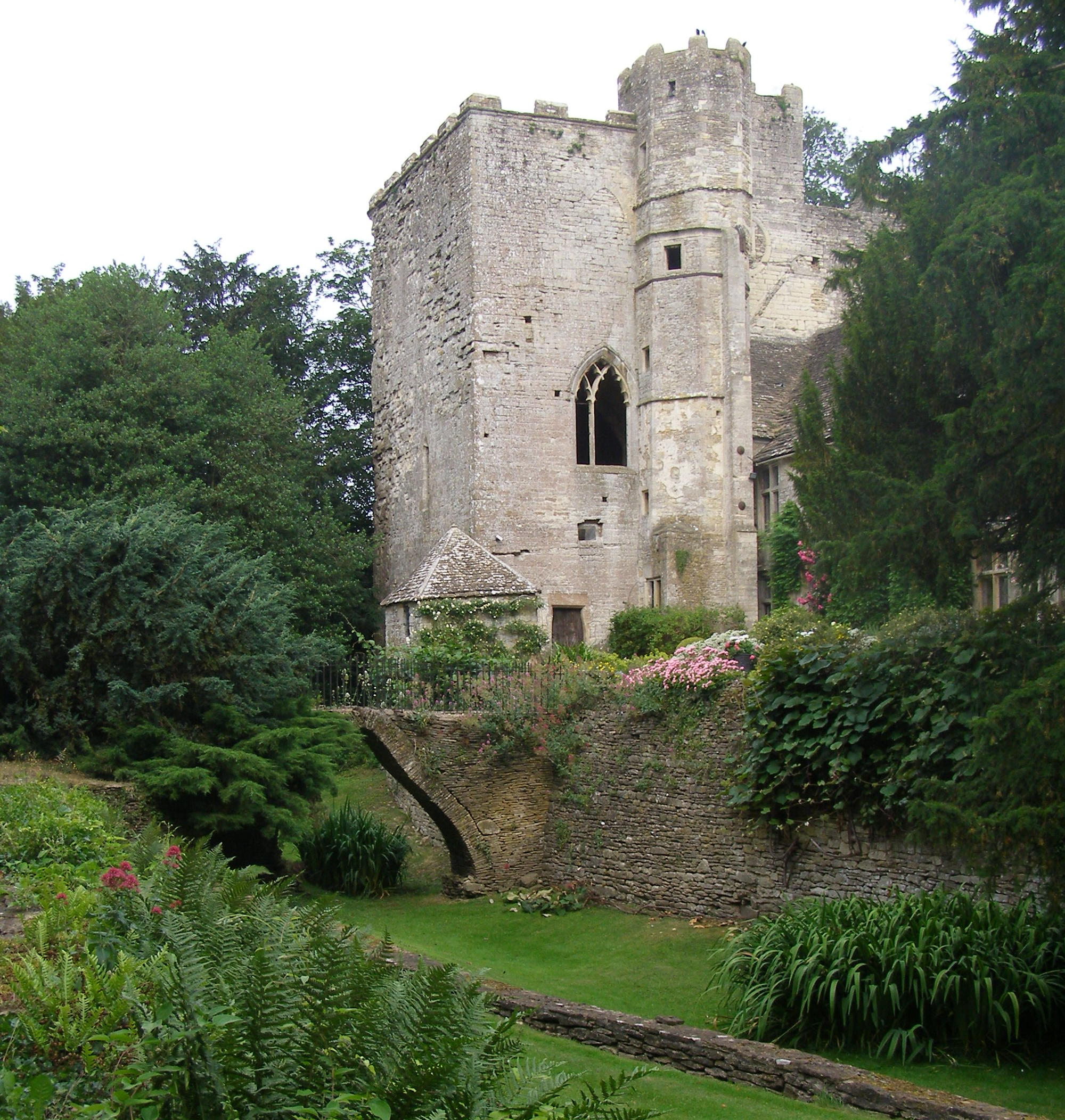
- Beverstone Castle, Gloucestershire
- Born: 1596
- Died: 9 October 1680 (aged 83–84)
- Education: Trinity College, Cambridge
- Occupations: Aristocrat, merchant, politician
- Spouse: Margaret Paget
- Children: 4 sons, 4 daughters
- Parent(s): Sir Michael Hicks; Elizabeth Coulston
- Relatives: William Paget, 4th Baron Paget de Beaudesert (father-in-law)

Sir William Hicks, 1st Baronet (1596 – 9 October 1680), of Beverston, in Gloucestershire, and of Ruckholt, at Leyton in Essex, was an English Member of Parliament.

== Early life ==
William Hicks was born in 1596. He was the son of the wealthy courtier Sir Michael Hicks, who was secretary to Lord Burghley during the reign of Queen Elizabeth, and wife Elizabeth Coulston; Burghley was his godfather, and he was named William in Burghley's honour. He inherited a substantial estate, including Beverstone Castle, on his father's death in 1612, and on 21 July 1619 was created a baronet.

It is said in the Dictionary of National Biography that he was educated at Trinity College, Cambridge, though this is not confirmed by the Venn reference work on Cambridge graduates.

== Career ==
Hicks served in two Parliaments as member for Great Marlow, that of 1625–6 and once more in the Short Parliament of 1640. During the Civil War he was a staunch Royalist, and saw action at the Siege of Colchester in 1648, as a result of which he was imprisoned for several weeks.

In 1669, Hicks acquired the manor of Chigwell, Essex.

== Personal life and death ==
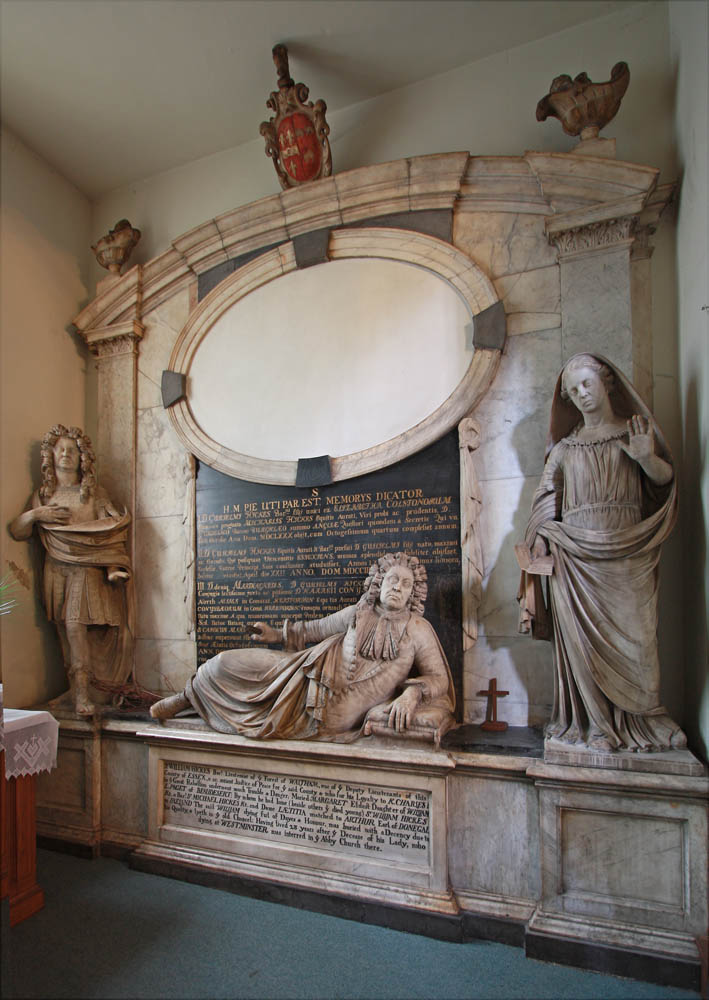
Monument at St Mary's Church, Leyton

He married Margaret Paget (born c. 1604 – buried 10 September 1652), daughter of William Paget, 4th Baron Paget de Beaudesert, and Lettice Knollys, and they had a number of children:

- Baptist, who died young
- Elizabeth, who died young
- Sir William Hicks, 2nd Baronet (1629–1703), succeeded to the baronetcy
- Letitia Hicks, who married Arthur Chichester, 1st Earl of Donegall
- Catherine, who died young
- Francis, who died young
- Sir Michael Hicks, whose line inherited the baronetcy after the death of the last of his brother's descendants, and from whom the Earls St Aldwyn are descended
- Elizabeth, who died young

Hicks died on 9 October 1680. He was buried at Leyton Parish Church where his monument records "his loyalty to King Charles in the Great Rebellion".

== Notes ==
Baronetage of England
| New creation | Baronet (of Beverston); 1619–1680 | Succeeded by William Hicks |
