= Thomas Hoby (disambiguation) =

Thomas Hoby was an English diplomat and translator.

Thomas Hoby may also refer to:

- Thomas Posthumous Hoby (1566–1640), English Puritan and politician
- Thomas Hoby (died 1706) (1642–1706), MP for Great Marlow and Salisbury
- Sir Thomas Hoby, 3rd Baronet (1685–1730) of the Hoby baronets
- Sir Thomas Hoby, 4th Baronet (died 1744), MP for Great Marlow

== See also ==
- Hoby (disambiguation)
