= Hoby (surname) =

Hoby is a surname, and may refer to:

- Alan Hoby (1914–2008), English sports journalist
- Edward Hoby (1560–1617), English diplomat, son of Thomas Hoby
- Hermione Hoby (born 1985), British author, journalist and cultural critic
- John Hoby (c. 1668 – 1689), English Member of Parliament
- Lady Margaret Hoby (1571–1633), English diarist
- Peregrine Hoby (1602–1679), English landowner and Member of Parliament
- Philip Hoby (1505–1558), English ambassador
- Sir Philip Hoby, 5th Baronet (c. 1716–1766), Church of Ireland priest
- Thomas Hoby (1530–1566), English diplomat and translator
- Thomas Hoby (died 1706) (1642–c.1706), English politician, son of Peregrine Hoby
- Thomas Posthumous Hoby (1566–1640), English politician
- Sir Thomas Hoby, 4th Baronet (after 1706 – 1744), English politician

== See also ==
- Hobby (surname)
- Hoby baronets

–
