= Anne Doddington =

English heiress

Anne Hoby (née Doddington, formerly Anne Greville, Baroness Brooke) (c. 1642–1690) was an English heiress.

== Early life ==
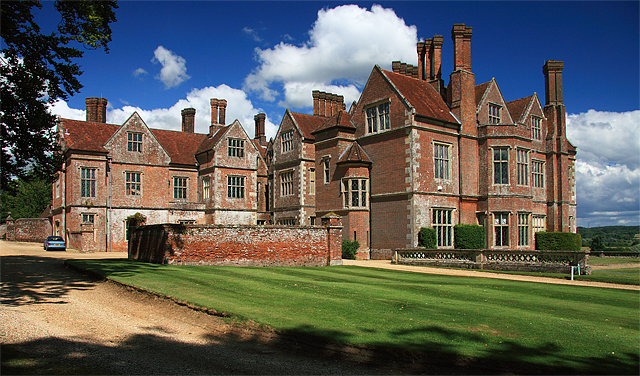
Her family estate, Breamore House, Hampshire.

Anne Doddington was born c. 1642 and was a daughter of John Doddington of Breamore House. Her mother was a sister of Sir Thomas Trench and her only surviving sibling was her sister Margaret Doddington, who married Sir Thomas Hannan, but died childless. Her father was a Member of Parliament for Lymington and had inherited a great number of estates, including the manor of South Charford.

Her father was the fourth son, and eventual heir, of Sir William Doddington of Breamore, an MP who served as High Sheriff of Hampshire. Among her extended family was uncle Herbert Doddington, aunt Katherine Doddington (wife of Peregrine Hoby, MP for Great Marlow), and aunt Ann Doddington (wife of John Bulkeley, MP for Yarmouth, Newtown, Hampshire, Christchurch, and Lymington). Through her father's maternal family, she was a descendant of Sir John Herbert of Neath Abbeym who served as Secretary of State under Elizabeth I and James I.

== Personal life ==
Anne was twice married. Her first husband was Robert Greville, 4th Baron Brooke (c. 1641–1676) of Beauchamps Court. Lord Brooke was a son of Robert Greville, 2nd Baron Brooke of Beauchamps Court and Lady Catherine Russell (a daughter of Francis Russell, 4th Earl of Bedford). His elder brother Francis Greville, 3rd Baron Brooke died unmarried in 1658 and her husband acceded to the barony. As a result of her marriage, Anne was styled as Baroness Brooke of Beauchamps Court and her surname became Greville. Her husband was one of the six commissioners deputed to invite the return of Charles II in 1660 and also served as Lord Lieutenant of Staffordshire. Together, they were the parents of six sons (John, Francis, Charles, Robert, William, and Fulke Greville) and two daughter, including:

- Hon. Anne Greville (c. 1670–1706), who married William Pierrepont, 4th Earl of Kingston-upon-Hull (c. 1662–1690) around 1685. After his death in 1690, she married William Pierrepont of Nottingham.
- Hon. Doddington Greville (1671–1720), who married Charles Montagu, 1st Duke of Manchester (c. 1662–1722), son of Robert Montagu, 3rd Earl of Manchester and the former Anne Yelverton (daughter of Sir Christopher Yelverton, 1st Baronet), in 1690 and became the first Duchess of Manchester.

Lord Brooke outlived all of his six sons before dying in 1676 when he was succeeded in his titles by his younger brother, Fulke Greville, 5th Baron Brooke (1643–1710), who represented Warwick in the House of Commons.

=== Second marriage ===
After the death of her first husband, she married her first cousin, Thomas Hoby (a son of Peregrine Hoby, MP, and the former Katherine Doddington) sometime after 1677. His elder brother was Sir Edward Hoby, 1st Baronet. After her marriage to Thomas, her married name became Hoby. Moby was a Member of Parliament for Great Marlow and Salisbury.

She died on 3 February 1690–91, intestate and her estate was administered to her husband on 8 July 1691. She was buried on 19 February 1690–91 at Breamore, Hampshire, England. Her widower died in 1706.

=== Descendants ===
Through her daughter Doddington, she was a grandmother of both the 2nd Duke of Manchester and the 3rd Duke of Manchester, and also of Charlotte Byng, Viscountess Torrington.
