= Winch (disambiguation) =

A winch is a mechanical device used to pull in, let out, or otherwise adjust the tension of a rope or cable.

Winch or winching may also refer to:

== People ==
- Eli Winch (1848–1938), an American manufacturer and politician
- Ernest Winch (1879–1957), a Canadian politician from British Columbia
- Harold Winch (1907–1993), a Canadian politician
- Hope Winch (1894 - 1944), English pharmacist
- Humphrey Winch (1555–1625), a judge who had a distinguished career in Ireland and England
- Sir Humphrey Winch, 1st Baronet (1622–1703), an English politician
- Joan Winch (1935–2022), Australian nurse and educator
- Nathaniel John Winch (1768–1838), English merchant, botanist and geologist
- Peter Winch (1926–1997), a British philosopher
- Ruth Winch (1870–1952), a British tennis player

== Activities ==
- Off-roading#Winch events with 4x4 vehicles in harsh environments termed "winching"

== See also ==
- Winch baronets, a title in the Baronetage of England
- East Winch, a village in Norfolk, England
- West Winch, a village in Norfolk, England
- Largo Winch, a Belgian comic book series
- Wrench (disambiguation)
