= Thomas Hoby (died 1706) =

English politician

Thomas Hoby JP DL

Member of Parliament for Salisbury
- In office 1689–1698 Serving with Giles Eyre, Thomas Pitt, Sir Thomas Mompesson
- Preceded by: John Wyndham
- Succeeded by: Charles Fox

Member of Parliament for Great Marlow
- In office 1681–1681 Serving with John Borlase
- Preceded by: Sir Humphrey Winch
- Succeeded by: Sir Humphrey Winch

Personal details
- Born: 1642
- Died: c. 1706
- Political party: Whig
- Spouse: Anne, Baroness Brooke (died 1690)
- Relations: Sir Edward Hoby, 1st Baronet (brother)
- Parent(s): Katherine Doddington Hoby; Peregrine Hoby

Thomas Hoby JP DL (1642 – c. 1706) of Bisham Abbey, Berkshire and Breamore, Hampshire, was an English politician.

== Early life ==
He was a younger son of the former Katherine Doddington and Peregrine Hoby, MP for Great Marlow. His elder brother was Edward Hoby (who was created a baronet by King Charles II in 1666), Sir John Hoby, 2nd Baronet (who succeeded to their brother's baronetcy), and Philip Hoby (who married Elizabeth Tyrrell, a daughter of Sir Timothy Tyrrell, a governor of Cardiff Castle).

== Career ==
Hoby was a Commissioner for Assessment for Berkshire, from 1679 to 1680, and for Hampshire, Wiltshire and Salisbury, from 1689 to 1690. From 1689 until his death, he was Justice of the Peace and Deputy Lieutenant for Hampshire and Wiltshire. He also served as Commissioner for Wastes and Spoils for New Forest in 1691.

After two unsuccessful attempts to enter the second Exclusion Parliament, he was returned as a Member of Parliament of the Parliament of England for the family borough, Great Marlow in 1681 succeeding Sir Humphrey Winch. He was appointed to the committee to draw up the third exclusion bill.

Through his marriage to his widowed cousin, he gained property downstream from Salisbury in the Avon Valley, for which he was returned to the Convention, succeeding John Wyndham as a Whig Member for Salisbury, serving on most, if not all, of the nineteen committees. He serving in three consecutive Parliaments from January 1689 to 1698.

== Personal life ==
Sometime after 1677, Hoby was married his first cousin, Anne, Baroness Brooke after the death of her first husband, Robert Greville, 4th Baron Brooke of Beauchamps Court (a son of Robert Greville, 2nd Baron Brooke and Lady Catherine Russell, and grandson of Francis Russell, 4th Earl of Bedford). Anne was a daughter of John Doddington of Breamore House, MP for Lymington, and a granddaughter of Sir William Doddington, who served as High Sheriff of Hampshire. Among her extended family was uncle Herbert Doddington and aunt Ann Doddington (wife of John Bulkeley, MP for Yarmouth, Newtown, Hampshire, Christchurch, Hampshire and Lymington). Through her father's maternal family, she was a descendant of Sir John Herbert of Neath Abbeym who served as Secretary of State under Elizabeth I and James I.

Hoby died around 1706. His will, which bequeathed his lands to his elder brother, was proved on 14 October 1707.

Parliament of England
Preceded by John Wyndham	Member of Parliament for Salisbury; 1689–1698; With: Giles Eyre, Thomas Pitt, Sir Thomas Mompesson	Succeeded by Charles Fox
Preceded by Sir Humphrey Winch	Member of Parliament for Great Marlow; 1681–1681; With: John Borlase	Succeeded by Sir Humphrey Winch
