= Peregrine Hoby =

English landowner and member of parliament (1602–1679)

Member of Parliament for Great Marlow
- In office 1660–1679 Serving with Bulstrode Whitelocke
- Preceded by: John Borlase; Gabriel Hippesley
- Succeeded by: Bulstrode Whitelocke; One seat vacant
- In office 1659–1659 Serving with William Borlase
- Preceded by: Constituency temporarily abolished
- Succeeded by: Bulstrode Whitelocke; One seat vacant
- In office 1640–1648 Serving with William Borlase; Charles Cheyne
- Preceded by: Bulstrode Whitelocke; One seat vacant
- Succeeded by: John Borlase; Sir Humphrey Winch

Personal details
- Born: 1 September 1602
- Died: 6 May 1679 (aged 76)
- Spouse: Katherine Doddington (m. 1631)
- Children: 5, including Sir Edward, Thomas
- Parent(s): Sir Edward Hoby; Katherine Pinckney
- Education: Eton College

Peregrine Hoby (1 September 1602 – 6 May 1679), was an English landowner and member of parliament who sat in the House of Commons at various times between 1640 and 1679.

== Early life ==
Hoby was the illegitimate son and heir of Sir Edward Hoby of Bisham Abbey in Berkshire, by Katherine Pinckney, a favourite of James I. His father, who was twice married (including to Margaret Carey, a daughter of Queen Elizabeth's cousin Henry Carey, 1st Baron Hunsdon) but never to his mother, had no legitimate children but Peregrine was brought up by him nevertheless and eventually made his father's heir.

His father was the eldest son of the English Ambassador to France Sir Thomas Hoby and his wife Elizabeth Cooke (the third daughter of Sir Anthony Cooke of Gidea Hall, tutor to Edward VI) and his younger brother was Thomas Posthumous Hoby. After his grandfather's death in Paris while Ambassador, his grandmother remarried to John, Lord Russell, eldest surviving son and heir to Francis Russell, 2nd Earl of Bedford (from this marriage, he was a nephew of Anne Russell, wife of Henry Somerset, 1st Marquess of Worcester). His father was also the nephew of William Cecil, Lord Burghley.

Hoby attended Eton College between 1612 and 1616. At his father's death in 1617, the elder Hoby committed him to the care of the Archbishop of Canterbury George Abbot.

== Career ==
He was High Sheriff of Berkshire in 1640. In November 1640 he was elected Member of Parliament for Great Marlow in the Long Parliament in a disputed election. He was excluded in Pride's Purge in December 1648. In 1659 he was elected MP for Great Marlow in the Third Protectorate Parliament.

He was also elected in 1660 for the Convention Parliament and in 1661 for the Cavalier Parliament. He sat until 1679 and died later in the same year at the age of 76.

== Personal life ==
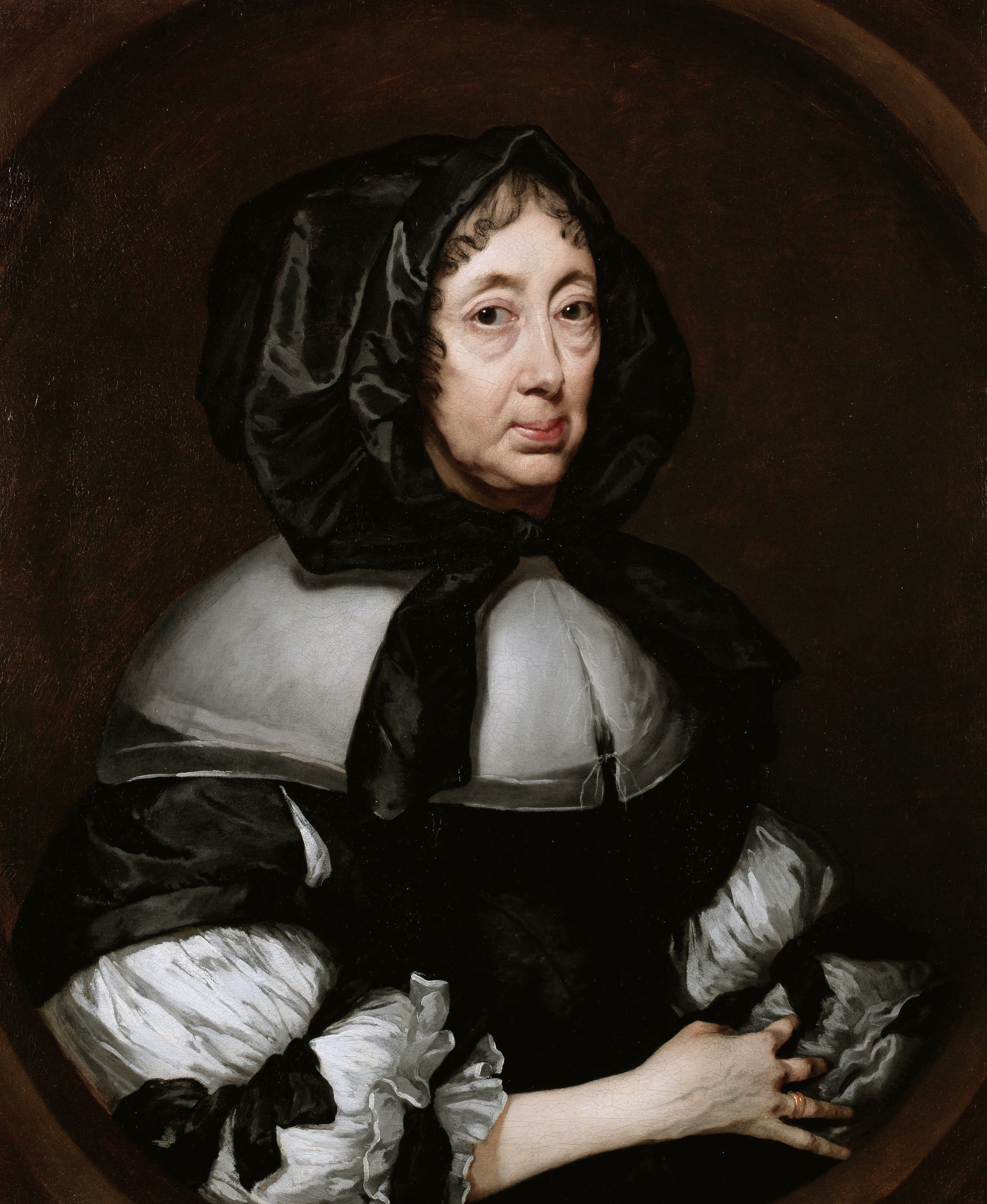
Hoby's wife, Katherine Doddington, by Pieter Borsselaer.

On 14 April 1631, Hoby married Katherine Doddington (died 1687) daughter and co-heiress of Mary (née Herbert) Doddington and Sir William Doddington of Breamore House in Hampshire. Among her siblings were brothers Herbert and John Doddington, both MPs for Lymington like their father. Together, they had four sons and one daughter, including:

- Sir Edward Hoby, 1st Baronet (1634–1675), his eldest son who was created a baronet by King Charles II in 1666. He married Elizabeth Styles, daughter and co-heiress of Francis Styles of Little Missenden.
- Sir John Hoby, 2nd Baronet (1635–1702), who married Mary Long, daughter and heiress of Thomas Long. They were the parents of Sir Thomas Hoby, 3rd Baronet.
- Philip Hoby (c. 1640–1678), who married Elizabeth Tyrrell, a daughter of Sir Timothy Tyrrell, a governor of Cardiff Castle, and sister of Sir Timothy and Sir Thomas Tyrrell.
- Thomas Hoby (1642–1706), an MP for Great Marlow and Salisbury who married his cousin, the Dowager Baroness Brooke (the former Anne Doddington), the daughter and heiress of John Doddington. She was the widow of Robert Greville, 4th Baron Brooke of Beauchamps Court (son of Robert Greville, 2nd Baron Brooke).

Hoby died on 6 May 1679. As his eldest son Edward predeceased him in 1675, Peregrine's heir was his second son, John, who also inherited his brother's baronetcy by special remainder.

=== Descendants ===
Through his grandson Sir Thomas Hoby, 3rd Baronet (1685–1730), the High Sheriff of Hampshire in 1715, he was a great-grandfather of Sir Thomas Hoby, 4th Baronet (c. 1714–1744) and the Rev. Sir Philip Hoby, 5th Baronet (c. 1716–1766), who both died unmarried at which time the baronetcy became extinct.

Parliament of England
Preceded by John Borlase; Gabriel Hippesley	Member of Parliament for Great Marlow; 1640–1648; With: Bulstrode Whitelocke	Succeeded by Bulstrode Whitelocke; One seat vacant
Constituency temporarily abolished	Member of Parliament for Great Marlow; 1659; With: William Borlase	Succeeded by Bulstrode Whitelocke; One seat vacant
Preceded by Bulstrode Whitelocke; One seat vacant	Member of Parliament for Great Marlow; 1660–1679; With: William Borlase 1660–1665; Charles Cheyne 1666–1679	Succeeded by John Borlase; Sir Humphrey Winch
