= John Doddington =

English landowner and politician

Member of Parliament for Lymington
- In office 1640–1640 Serving with John Kempe
- Preceded by: Parliament suspended since 1629
- Succeeded by: John Button; Henry Campion

Personal details
- Relations: Herbert Doddington (brother); Sir Edward Hoby, 1st Baronet (nephew)
- Children: Margaret Doddington; Anne Dodington
- Parent(s): Sir William Doddington; Mary Herbert Doddington

John Doddington was an English landowner and politician who sat in the House of Commons in 1640.

== Early life ==
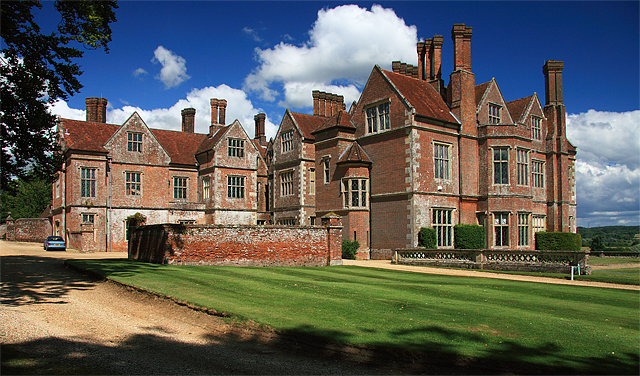
Breamore House, Hampshire.

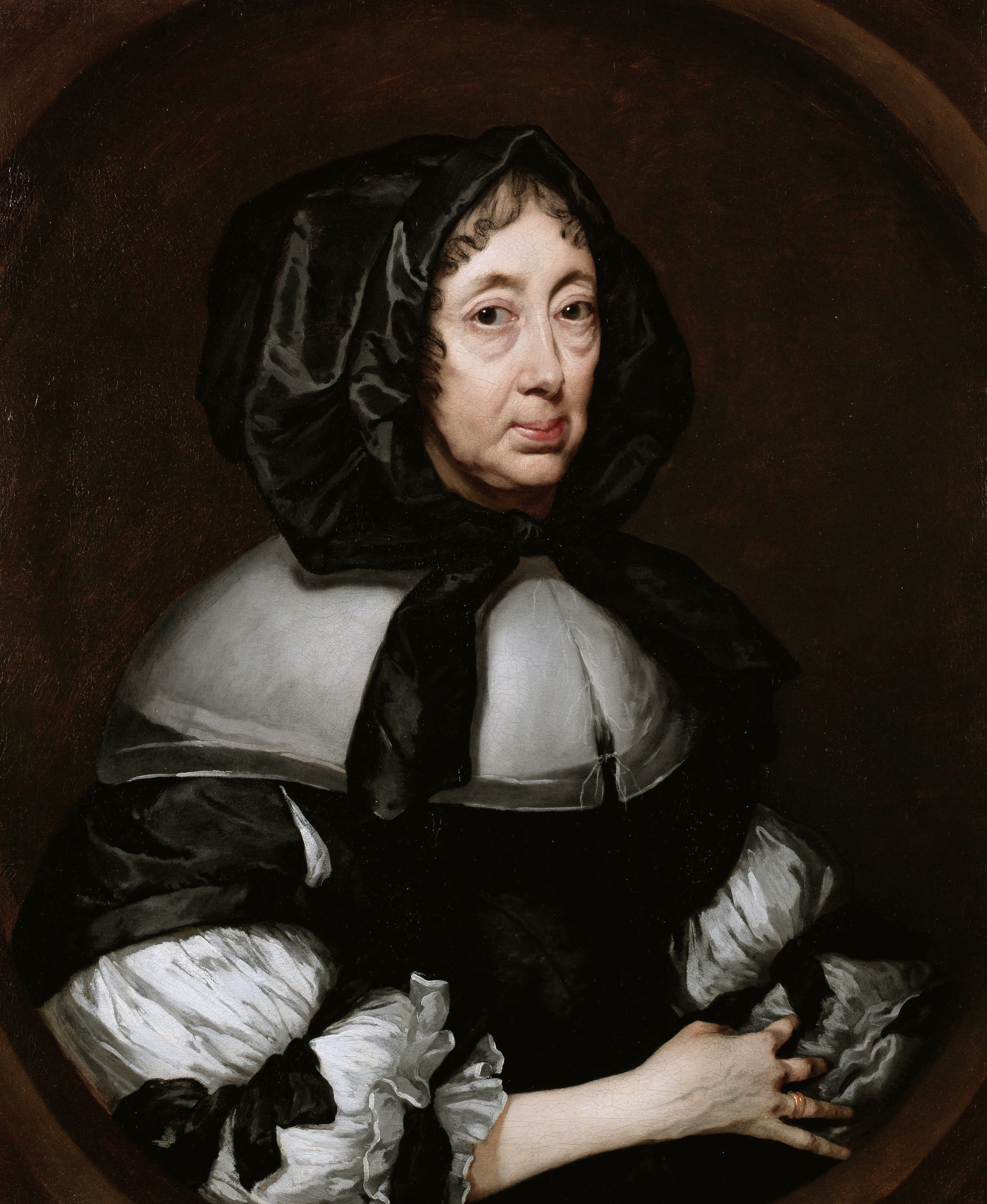
Portrait of his sister, Katherine Doddington Hoby, by Pieter Borsselaer.

Doddington was the fourth son of the former Mary Herbert and Sir William Doddington (1572–1638) of Breamore, an MP who served as High Sheriff of Hampshire. When his parents married, his mother brought the manor of Candleston Castle. His father settled the manor of South Charford on his brother Herbert Doddington when he married Elizabeth Colles in 1629. His sister Katherine Doddington married Peregrine Hoby, MP for Great Marlow, and his sister Ann Doddington married John Bulkeley, MP for Yarmouth, Newtown, Hampshire, Christchurch, Hampshire and Lymington.

In 1629, his brother Henry Doddington was hanged in London for murdering their mother.

His paternal grandfather was William Dodington of Breamore House (who died in 1600), and his maternal grandparents were Margaret (née Morgan) Herbert and Sir John Herbert of Neath Abbey who served as Secretary of State under Elizabeth I and James I.

== Career ==
After his brother Herbert died childless in 1633, his father held the manor of South Charford again until his death in 1638, when John inherited all his estates and Breamore House.

In April 1640, Doddington was elected Member of Parliament for Lymington in the Short Parliament.

== Personal life ==
Doddington married a sister of Sir Thomas Trench. Together they had two daughters:

- Margaret Doddington, who married Sir Thomas Hannan but died childless.
- Anne Dodington (c. 1642–1690), who married Robert Greville, 4th Baron Brooke (c. 1641–1676), son of Robert Greville, 2nd Baron Brooke. After his death in 1676, she married Thomas Hoby MP for Great Marlow and Salisbury.

=== Descendants ===
Through his daughter Anne, he was a grandfather of Doddington Greville, Duchess of Manchester (1671–1720), who married Charles Montagu, 1st Duke of Manchester in 1690, as well as John, Francis, Charles, Robert, William, and Fulke Greville. As all their sons died before their father, the titles passed to his younger brother, Fulke Greville, 5th Baron Brooke (1643–1710), who inherited the manor of South Charford remaining in the family until around 1748, when Francis Greville, 8th Baron Brooke sold his Hampshire estates.

Parliament of England
Vacant Parliament suspended since 1629	Member of Parliament for Lymington; 1640; With: John Kempe	Succeeded by John Button; Henry Campion
