= Sir Humphrey Winch, 1st Baronet =

English politician

Sir Humphrey Winch, 1st Baronet (3 January 1622 – December 1703) was an English politician who sat in the House of Commons between 1660 and 1689.

Winch was the eldest son of Onslow Winch of Everton, Bedfordshire and his wife Judith Burgoyne, daughter of Roger Burgoyne of Wroxall, Warwickshire and his first wife Margaret Wendy, and sister of Sir John Burgoyne, 1st Baronet. His other grandfather was Sir Humphrey Winch, Lord Chief Justice of Ireland (died 1625). Winch purchased the Hawnes estate (now known as Haynes Park) in Bedfordshire in 1654 and by 1659 had sold the manor of Everton which he had inherited from his father.

== Career ==
In 1660, Winch was elected Member of Parliament for Bedford in the Convention Parliament. He was created a baronet of Hawnes in the County of Bedford on 9 June 1660. In 1661 he was elected MP for Bedfordshire in the Cavalier Parliament and sat until 1679. He was a diligent MP who sat on numerous committees in the Commons, and was regarded as a reliable supporter of the Crown. He sold the estate of Hawnes in 1667 to Sir George Carteret, Bt, and moved to Harleyford Manor, near Great Marlow. He was MP for Great Marlow from 1679 to 1681 and from 1685 to 1689. He was a Lord Commissioner of the Admiralty between 1679 and 1684.

Winch died at the age of 81.

== Family ==
Winch married Rebecca Browne, daughter of Alderman Martin Browne of London. He had at least three daughters: Judith, who married Sir Humphrey Forster, 2nd Baronet, Rebecca, who married Sir Thomas Lawley, 3rd Baronet, and Mary, who married Francis Bickley, 3rd Baronet, but no sons, and the title became extinct on his death in 1703, although it was erroneously assumed by his nephew, Humphrey Winch, of Branston, Lincolnshire. He had settled his Lincolnshire estates on his brother Richard. His descendants through his grandson Sir Robert Lawley gained the title Baron Wenlock.

His widow died in 1713: her manuscript book of family recipes and herbal remedies has survived. It contains some useful information on the family's history, such as the early death of nearly all her Lawley grandchildren: of fourteen children of Sir Thomas Lawley and Rebecca, only three reached adulthood. One of the three surviving children, Elizabeth, was through her second marriage to Sir Nicholas Lawes, Governor of Jamaica, the ancestor of Anne, Duchess of Cumberland and Strathearn.

Parliament of England
Preceded by Sir Beauchamp St John; Sir Samuel Luke	Member of Parliament for Bedford; 1660; With: Sir Samuel Luke	Succeeded by Richard Taylor; John Kelyng
Preceded by Lord Bruce of Whorlton; Samuel Browne	Member of Parliament for Bedfordshire; 1661–1679; With: Lord Bruce of Whorlton 1661–1664; Sir John Napier, Bt	Succeeded by Lord Russell; Sir Humphrey Monoux, Bt
Preceded by Charles Cheyne; Peregrine Hoby	Member of Parliament for Great Marlow; 1679–1681; With: John Borlase	Succeeded by John Borlase; Thomas Hoby
Preceded by John Borlase; Thomas Hoby	Member of Parliament for Great Marlow; 1685–1689; With: Sir John Borlase, Bt	Succeeded by Sir John Borlase, Bt; The Viscount Falkland
Baronetage of England
New creation	Baronet (of Hawnes); 1660–1703	Extinct
