= Hoby =

Hoby may refer to:

== People with the given name ==
- Hoby Brenner (born 1959), former American football tight end
- Hoby Darling, American business executive
- Hoby Milner (born 1991), an American professional baseball pitcher for the Philadelphia Phillies

== People with the surname ==
- Hoby (surname)

== Places named Hoby ==
- Bräkne-Hoby, a locality in Sweden
- Hoby, Leicestershire, a village in England

== Fictional characters named Hoby ==
- Hoby Gilman, Texas Ranger played by Robert Culp in Trackdown (TV series)

== Other uses ==
- Hoby treasure, an archeological discovery in Denmark
- Hugh O'Brian Youth Leadership Foundation, a youth organization in the United States

== See also ==
- Hoby baronets
- Bräkne-Hoby
- Hobby (disambiguation)
