= John Button (Parliamentarian) =

English politician

John Button (died 1665) of Buckland, near Lymington, Hampshire was an English politician who sat in the House of Commons at various times between 1625 and 1648. He fought on the Parliamentary side in the English Civil War.

Button was the son of John Button of Upavon, Wiltshire. He succeeded his father in 1601, and inherited Buckland, Hampshire from his uncle Henry in 1624. He was appointed High Sheriff of Hampshire for 1636.

In 1625, he was elected Member of Parliament for Lymington. He was elected MP for Lymington again in November 1640 for the Long Parliament. Button fought in the parliamentary army and held local offices and that of Captain of Hurst Castle from 1643 to 1645. He was secluded in 1648 under Pride's Purge.

Button married as his first wife Eleanor South, daughter of Thomas South of South Baddesley. Their son John was later MP for Lymington.

Parliament of England
Preceded by Nicholas Ferrar; John Moor	Member of Parliament for Lymington; 1625; With: John Mills	Succeeded by Herbert Doddington; John Moor
Preceded by John Doddington; John Kempe	Member of Parliament for Lymington; 1640–1649; With: Henry Campion	Succeeded by Not represented in Rump Parliament
