= Leicester boy =

Witchcraft trial of 15 women in Leicester, UK

The Leicester boy trial was one of Leicester's most notorious witchcraft cases, in which a thirteen-year-old boy publicly accused 15 women of causing a possession within him. The case took place in Husbands Bosworth, a small village not far from Leicester in 1616. John Smith fell into a series of violent fits, not even several men could hold him down. He made strange noises, and, as noted in a letter from Alderman Robert Heyrick to his brother Sir William, he would beat himself with inhuman strength, yet somehow remain unharmed. He gave extensive details on their familiars. The two judges, Sir Humphrey Winch and Sir Ranulph Crewe quickly condemned the women, rounding all 15 of them up. Nine of them were tried, found guilty and hanged for allegedly possessing John Smith. The other six were placed in prison to wait their turn. None of them were named before being hanged. King James I happened to be passing through about a month later, and heard what was going on. He called for John Smith to be questioned, and had little trouble determining the child was fraudulent. He broke down, and confessed the truth. Of the six women who had been imprisoned, only five of them were released, as one of them died inside. According to a timeline, the woman who had died told the jailer she was working with the witches against Smith the day before she died. She had begged him not to say anything because the witches would harm her.

It was not until recently that courts began to consider child testimonies again, though they still deeply consider them before trusting them. Due to the Leicester Boy case, and others like it, many judges were wary of trusting anyone, especially children, in claims of witchcraft. The two judges associated with the cases had their reputations seriously damaged, and the story was transformed into a satirical comedy making fun of them in The Devil Is an Ass by Ben Jonson.

== Religious and political background ==
During the time of the witch trials, it was not difficult to rile people up over accusations of witchcraft. The Witchcraft Act 1603 had just been passed by King James. The act, which was named An Act Against Conjuration, Witchcraft and dealing with evil and wicked spirits, altered the law and made witchcraft a felony punishable by death. It added that it would be without the benefit of the clergy for anyone who "invoked evil spirits or communed with familiars". Ironically it was the King himself who put an end to the Leicester hysteria.

== Events leading up to the trial ==
Before the trial, John Smith began to have these strange fits during which he exhibited inhuman levels of strength. No number of men could hold the boy down, and he would beat himself, sometimes up to 300 times at once, all over his body without leaving a mark. During these fits, he would speak in strangled phrases and contract his "whole body within the compass of a Joyn'd-stool". He would write in Hebrew and Greek characters. He told the judges, and others, that he was being possessed by witches' familiars, and described them at great length. He listed off "horse, cat, dog, pullemar, fish, code" and made out the animal's cries based on which was allegedly possessing him. The boy's family called in the Bosworth witches, nine of them, to attempt to exorcise the boy. However, they were unable to. It was July 1616. The women were hauled off, and hanged. Later in the year, in October, he accused six more women of witchcraft against him. The women were listed as anonymous, and unnamed, and hauled off for inquisition.

== The Trials ==
It was 18 July 1616. The first six women were made to chant a counter spell, which was intended to identify them as witches. John Smith would cry out in pain and distress anytime they didn't chant:

I such a one chardge the hors. Yf I be a wiche, that thou com forthe of the child.

All nine of them were hanged as witches in the trial that same day. The rest were imprisoned by the judges of assize, Sir Humphrey Winch and Sir Ranulph Crewe later in the year. Allegedly, one of the six women, listed as anonymous, confessed to the jailer that she was "in concert with her familiar, and with the other accused witches, to torment Smyth." She begged him to keep her secret, and the following day, she died in the cell.

King James came passing through, and caught wind of the witchcraft trials. He was curious, and wanted to see who had made the accusation. Upon learning that it was a mere 13-year-old boy, he summoned him as quickly as possible, and promptly declared him to be a fraud. The five survivors were released from prison.

== Literary adaptations and other media ==
- A History of Witchcraft in England from 1558 to 1718, Wallace Notestein
- King James I and "The Devil is an Ass" Vol. 9, No. 2, G.L. Kittredge
- Witch Hunts in the Western World: Persecution and Punishment from the Inquisition through the Salem Trials, Brian Pavlac
- Ben Jonson: A Life, Ian Donaldson
- Dictionary of Witchcraft, David Pickering

== Media ==
- The Witches of Husbands Bosworth, Liberal England: The witches of Husbands Bosworth 29 August 2009
- The Witch Trial That Made Legal History, Frances Cronin, BBC News The witch trial that made legal history

== Similar cases ==
=== Pendle Witch Trials ===
Jennet Device, 9 years old, was the key witness in the Pendle Witch Trials against 12 people who were charged with the murder of 10 people with witchcraft. 10 were tried in 1612 as a group, and were hanged for child murder and cannibalism. Device gave evidence against her mother, brother and sister. Later in life, she was tried and found guilty in 1633–1634, and imprisoned until death.

=== Torsåker Witch Trials ===
The Torsåker witch trials in Sweden were intense, and children were actively used to give the trial the priest, Laurentius Christophori Hornæus, wanted. He would torture them psychologically and physically until they would say what he wanted them to say. On 15 October over 100 people were accused, and a majority were executed. This went on until 1676, when authorities were finally able to prove that the children were falsely testifying.

=== Sarah Good ===
In Salem, Massachusetts, Sarah Good, along with Sarah Osborne and Tituba, were accused in February 1692 of afflicting Betty Parris and Abigail Williams, two young girls who were having hysterical fits and convulsions. The whole town wanted to rid themselves of Sarah Good, who was considered a homeless beggar. She simply repeated over and over that she was falsely accused. Her execution was in July 1692.

== See also ==
- Gävle Boy
