= Borlase baronets =

Extinct baronetcy in the Baronetage of England

Borlase baronets, of Bockmer
- Arms: Ermine on a bend sable two arms issuing from the clouds rending a horse-shoe, all proper

The Borlase Baronetcy, of Bockmer in the County of Buckinghamshire was a title in the Baronetage of England. It was created on 4 May 1642 for John Borlase, Member of Parliament for Great Marlow, Corfe Castle and Wycombe. He was succeeded by his only son, who also sat in the House of Commons for Wycombe and Great Marlow. On the second Baronet's death in 1689, the baronetcy became extinct.

== Borlase baronets, of Bockmer (1642) ==
- Sir John Borlase, 1st Baronet (1619–1672)
- Sir John Borlase, 2nd Baronet (1640–1689)
