= Sir John Borlase, 2nd Baronet =

English politician

Sir John Borlase, 2nd Baronet (1640 – 1 February 1689) was an English politician.

Born in Bockmer End in Buckinghamshire, he was the son of Sir John Borlase, 1st Baronet and Alice Bankes, daughter of Sir John Bankes, Lord Chief Justice of the Court of Common Pleas and Mary Hawtrey. His nephew was Borlase Warren.

John Borlase was educated at Oriel College, Oxford, where he matriculated in 1658. In 1672, he succeeded his father as the 2nd baronet. A year later, he entered the English House of Commons as member of parliament (MP) for Wycombe, representing the constituency until 1681. From 1685 until his death in 1689, he was also returned for Great Marlow.

Borlase died unmarried and was buried in Stratton Audley in Oxfordshire. With his death the baronetcy became extinct. His estate passed eventually to his nephew Borlase Warren, who sat as MP for Nottingham in four Parliaments between 1713 and 1747.

Parliament of England
| Preceded by Sir John Borlase, Bt; Sir Edmund Pye, Bt | Member of Parliament for Wycombe; 1673–1681; With: Sir Edmund Pye, Bt 1673; Robert Sawyer 1673–1679; Thomas Lewes 1679–1681 | Succeeded by Sir Dennis Hampson, Bt; Edward Baldwin |
| Preceded by Thomas Hoby; John Borlase | Member of Parliament for Great Marlow; 1685–1689; With: Sir Humphrey Winch 1685–1689; The Viscount Falkland 1689 | Succeeded by The Viscount Falkland; John Hoby |
Baronetage of England
| Preceded by John Borlase | Baronet (of Bockmer); 1672–1689 | Extinct |
