= John More (died 1638) =

English politician

John More (c. 1578–1638) was an English politician who sat in the House of Commons in 1624 and 1626.

More was the son of Thomas Moore of Faringdon in Berkshire. In 1624, he was elected member of parliament for Lymington in the Happy Parliament. He was elected MP for Lymington again in 1626.

More died at the age of about 60.

Parliament of England
Preceded by Sir William Doddington; Henry Crompton	Member of Parliament for Lymington; 1624; With: Nicholas Ferrar	Succeeded by John Button; John Mills
Preceded by John Button; John Mills	Member of Parliament for Lymington; 1626; With: Herbert Doddington	Succeeded by Herbert Doddington; Richard Whitehead
