= Wrench (disambiguation) =

A wrench or spanner is a type of hand tool.

Wrench may also refer to:

== Arts and entertainment ==
- Wrench (comics), a fictional character in the Marvel Universe
- The Wrench, a 1978 novel by Primo Levi
- Mr. Wrench, a fictional character in the American TV series Fargo
- "Wrench", a song by The Almighty from Crank
- "Wrench", a song by Apparatus from their self-titled album
- "Wrench", a song by Funeral for a Friend from Your History Is Mine: 2002–2009

== Other uses ==
- Wrench (surname) (including a list of people with the name)
- Wrench (screw theory), in applied mathematics and physics

== See also ==
- Wrench fault, in geology
- Winch, a mechanical device used mostly for (un)winding of ropes
