= William Borlase (died 1665) =

English politician

William Borlase (15 October 1620 – October 1665) was an English politician of the Borlase family who sat in the House of Commons between 1659 and 1665.

Borlase was the younger son of Sir William Borlase of Marlow who was MP for Wycombe, and his wife Amy Popham, daughter of Sir Francis Popham. His elder brother was Sir John Borlase, 1st Baronet. He matriculated at Magdalen Hall, Oxford on 30 April 1635, aged 14, and was a student at Inner Temple in 1637.

In 1659, Borlase was elected Member of Parliament for Great Marlow in the Third Protectorate Parliament. He was re-elected for Great Marlow in the Convention Parliament and again in 1661 for the Cavalier Parliament. He sat until his death in 1665 at the age of 45. He was buried on 1 November 1665.

Borlase married Joanna Bankes, daughter of Sir John Bankes, Chief Justice of the Common Pleas and his wife Mary Hawtrey; her sister Alice married his brother John. They had a son and four daughters. His son John was MP for Marlow in 1679. His daughter Henrietta married firstly Sir Richard Astley, 1st Baronet and secondly in 1690, John Richmond Webb of Biddesden, Wiltshire. His daughter Anne married Thomas Wingfield, High Sheriff of Shropshire in 1692, and his daughter Alicia married John Wallop of Farleigh Wallop, Hampshire and had issue, including John Wallop, 1st Earl of Portsmouth.

Parliament of England
Preceded by Not represented in Second Protectorate Parliament	Member of Parliament for Great Marlow; 1659; With: Peregrine Hoby	Succeeded by Bulstrode Whitelocke
Preceded by Bulstrode Whitelocke	Member of Parliament for Great Marlow; 1660–1665; With: Peregrine Hoby	Succeeded by Peregrine Hoby; Charles Cheyne
