= Winch baronets =

Extinct baronetcy in the Baronetage of England

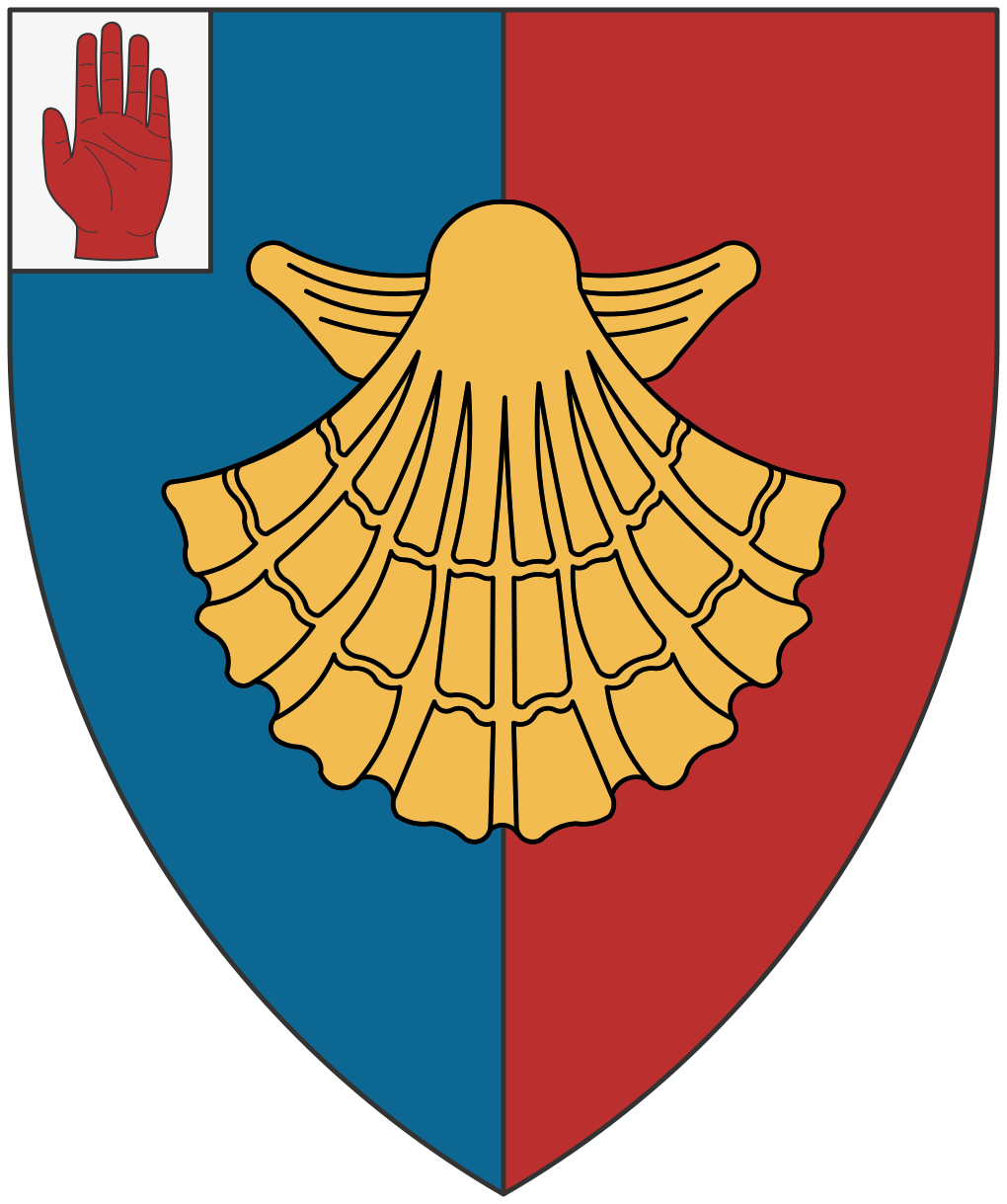
Arms of Winch of Hawnes

The Winch Baronetcy, of Hawnes in the County of Bedford, was a title in the Baronetage of England. It was created on 9 June 1660 for Humphrey Winch, subsequently Member of Parliament for Bedford, Bedfordshire and Great Marlow and a Lord Commissioner of the Admiralty. He was the grandson and namesake of Sir Humphrey Winch. Winch had no sons and the title became extinct on his death in 1703, although it was erroneously assumed by his nephew, Humphrey Winch, of Branston, Lincolnshire.

Winch purchased the Hawnes estate in Bedfordshire in 1654. However, it was sold in 1667 to Sir George Carteret, Bt.

== Winch baronets, of Hawnes (1660) ==
- Sir Humphrey Winch, 1st Baronet (1622–1703)
