= John Kempe (MP) =

English politician

John Kempe (c. 1610 – 5 October 1652) was an English politician who sat in the House of Commons from 1640 to 1652. He supported the Parliamentarian cause in the English Civil War.

Kempe was the son of Thomas Kempe of Beaulieu, and his wife Mary Oglander, daughter of Sir William Oglander. His father died in 1622, leaving him the family estate, and his mother remarried Bromfield. He was admitted at Gray's Inn on 2 May 1631.

In April 1640, Kempe was elected Member of Parliament for Lymington in the Short Parliament. In 1645, he elected MP for Christchurch in the Long Parliament. He carried the demands of the Parliamentarians to the King Charles when he was imprisoned at Carisbrooke Castle, but is not recorded in the Rump Parliament after Pride's Purge'

Kempe lived at Buckler's Hard, near Beaulieu and at Haywood in the parish of Boldre. He died unmarried in 1652 at the age of 41 and was buried at Boldre Church on 7 October. There remains a striking alabaster bust with a Latin inscription on the north wall of the nave at Boldre Church.

Parliament of England
Vacant Parliament suspended since 1629	Member of Parliament for Lymington; 1640; With: John Doddington	Succeeded by John Button; Henry Campion
Preceded by Matthew Davis; Henry Tulse	Member of Parliament for Christchurch; 1640–1653; With: Richard Edwards	Not represented in Barebones Parliament
