= Sir John Borlase, 1st Baronet =

English politician (1619-1672)

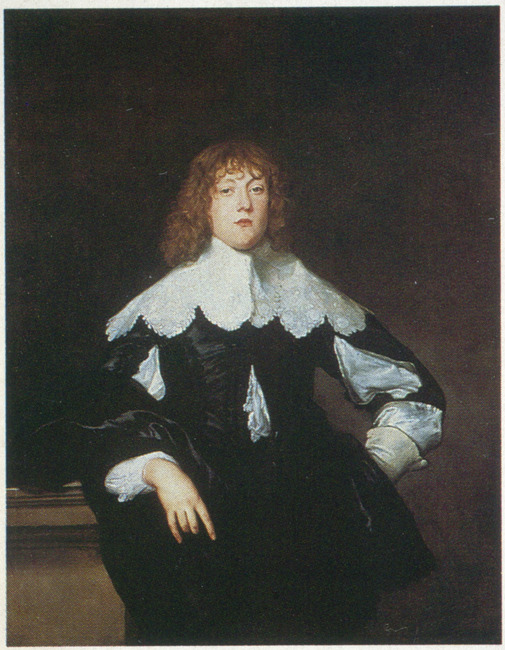
Van Dyck - Portrait of Sir John Borlase (1637-1638)

Sir John Borlase, 1st Baronet (21 August 1619 – 8 August 1672) of Bockmer, Medmenham, Buckinghamshire was an English politician who sat in the House of Commons between 1640 and 1644. He supported the Royalist cause in the English Civil War.

== Background ==
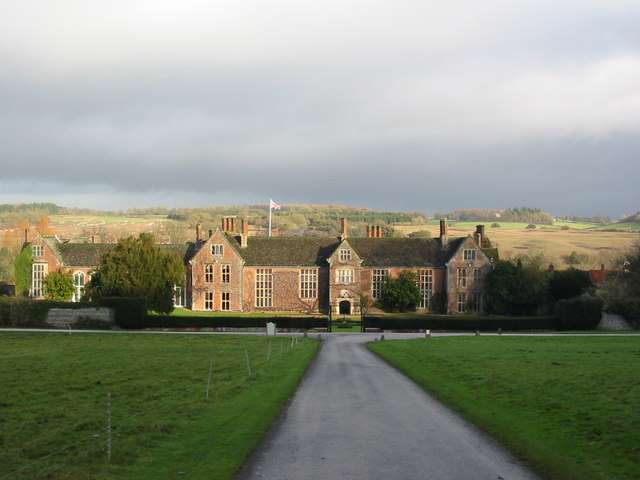
Littlecote House

Borlase was born at the Popham family seat of Littlecote House, Wiltshire, the eldest son of Sir William Borlase and his wife Amy Popham, daughter of Sir Francis Popham. William Borlase MP his younger brother.

He was educated at Magdalen Hall, Oxford, where he matriculated on 30 April 1635. He was called to the Bar by the Inner Temple in the following year.

== Career ==
In April 1640, Borlase was elected Member of Parliament for Great Marlow in the Short Parliament. His re-election as MP for Marlow to the Long Parliament in November 1640 was declared void after a dispute. Instead, Borlase was returned as MP for Corfe Castle in 1641. On 4 May 1642, he was created baronet of Bockmer, in the County of Buckingham. He was disabled from sitting for his Royalist tendencies in 1644. In 1645, he was imprisoned by order of Oliver Cromwell, but released for a fine of £2400 a year later.

After the Restoration, Borlase represented Wycombe in the Cavalier Parliament from 1661 until his death in 1672.

Borlase died, aged 52 at Bockmer and was buried in Little Marlow four days later.

== Family ==
Borlase married Alice Bankes, daughter of Sir John Bankes, Chief Justice of the Common Pleas and his wife Mary Hawtrey, at St Giles in the Fields, London on 4 December 1637. They had seven children, six daughters and one son. He was succeeded in the baronetcy by his only son John. John had no issue, and on his death, his estates passed to his nephew, Borlase Warren, the son of his sister Anne.

Parliament of England
Vacant Parliament suspended since 1629	Member of Parliament for Great Marlow; 1640; With: Sir William Hicks, 1st Baronet; Gabriel Hippesley	Succeeded by Bulstrode Whitelocke; Peregrine Hoby
Preceded by Sir Francis Windebank; Giles Green	Member of Parliament for Corfe Castle; 1640–1644; With: Giles Green	Succeeded by Giles Green; Francis Chettel
Preceded by Edmund Petty; Richard Browne	Member of Parliament for Wycombe; 1661–1672; With: Sir Edmund Pye, Bt	Succeeded by Sir John Borlase, Bt; Sir Edmund Pye, Bt
Baronetage of England
New creation	Baronet (of Bockmer); 1642–1672	Succeeded by John Borlase
