= Wrench (surname) =

Wrench is a surname, and may refer to:

- Benjamin Wrench (1778–1843), English actor
- Christopher Wrench (born 1958), Australian organist and lecturer
- Connor Wrench (born 2001), British rugby player
- David Wrench (disambiguation), multiple people
- Edward Thomas Jones Wrench (1828–1893), Australian businessman
- Edwin Wrench (1876–1948), English-born Australian politician
- Evelyn Wrench (1882–1966), British journalist
- George Wrench (1876–1948), English-born Australian politician
- Guy T. Wrench (1877–1954), British agronomist and physician
- John Wrench (1911–2009), American mathematician
- John Mervyn Dallas Wrench (1883–1961), British engineer
- Margaret Stanley-Wrench (1916–1974), English poet and author
- Mark Wrench (born 1969), English footballer
- Nigel Wrench, English radio presenter
- Sarah Wrench (1833–1848), reputed witch buried at East Mersea
