= Gabriel Hippesley =

English courtier and politician

Gabriel Hippesley was an English courtier and politician.

An equerry to King Charles I, he was severely fined by Parliament for his adherence to the royal cause.

He was elected, together with Sir John Borlase, 1st Baronet, as a Member of the Parliament of England for Great Marlow in the Long Parliament of November 1640. The election was declared void and in a second election Parliamentarians Peregrine Hoby and Bulstrode Whitelocke were declared elected instead.

Hippesley married Amy Popham, the widow of William Borlase, MP, and had one son.
