= Richard Whitehead (Hampshire MP) =

English politician

Richard Whitehead or Whithed (1594 – c. 1663) was an English politician who sat in the House of Commons at various times between 1628 and 1653. He fought for the Parliamentary army in the English Civil War.

Whitehead was baptised on 15 January 1594, the eldest son of Sir Henry Whitehead of Norman Court, Hampshire and his first wife Anne, daughter of James Weston, the chancellor of the Diocese of Lichfield. He was educated at Brasenose College, Oxford, where he matriculated in 1610, and was awarded BA in 1612. He studied law at the Inner Temple in 1613 and travelled abroad between 1614 and 1617.

In 1628, he was elected Member of Parliament for Lymington and sat until 1629 when King Charles decided to rule without parliament for eleven years. Whitehead inherited the family estates at Shirley and Hill on the death of his father in 1629. In 1635, he was appointed High Sheriff of Hampshire when he had the task of collecting ship money for the county. He wrote to the council complaining of the backwardness of the county, and imprisoned a constable who failed to certify the defaulters and who argued that the money "would never be gathered during his lifetime". Nevertheless, he was ordered to collect the arrears, which stood at £404.

In April 1640, Whitehead was elected Member of Parliament for Hampshire in the Short Parliament. He was re-elected MP for Hampshire for the Long Parliament in November 1640. Whitehead became a faithful adherent of Parliament during the Civil War, possibly soured against the King's cause because of his experience with collecting ship money. He was one of the colonels of regiments in the Parliamentary army of Hampshire and Sussex, together with Richard Norton, Onslow, Jarvis, and Morley.

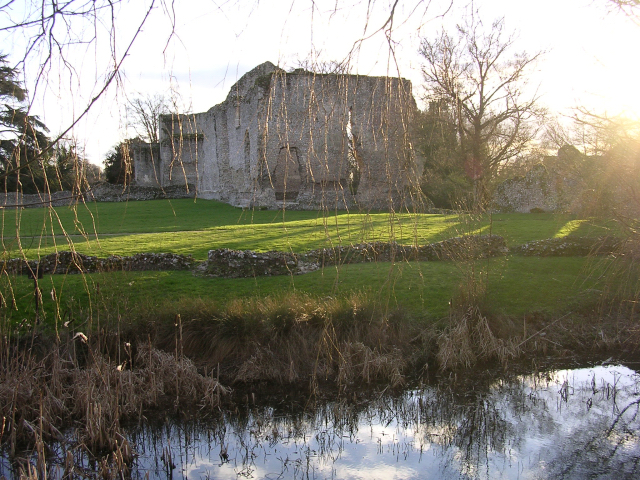
Ruins of Bishop's Waltham Palace

In 1643, Whitehead was appointed to extract large sums of money from Royalists on pain of imprisonment at Portsmouth, and is said to have remarked that he "had been at a great charge to build a cage at Portsmouth where many Hampton birds should sing very suddenly." Under the command of General William Waller he was present at the siege of Basing House at the beginning of 1644. He also besieged Bishop's Waltham Palace, and obtained its surrender with the help of Major-General Richard Browne's London brigade. He was given permission "to pull down the house if he chose." In June 1644 the House of Commons instructed him and others to sequestrate the estates of Papists and delinquents valued at less than £12,000 within London and Westminster in order to pay off arrears to the garrisons of Portsmouth and of Hurst Castle, Southsea Castle and Calshot Castle.

Whitehead was married three times. His first wife, by a marriage settlement dated 1 August 1621, was Margery Culliford, daughter of John Culliford of Encombe, Dorset. The couple had three sons and eight daughters, among whom were Henry, Richard's heir and MP for Portsmouth in 1660 and Stockbridge from 1679 to 1680, and Richard, who sat for Stockbridge in 1659 and 1660. Richard remarried c.1640 to Lucy, daughter of Robert Dove, vicar of St Neots, Huntingdonshire between 1616 and 1622. Lucy was the widow of Richard Organ of Lambourn, Berkshire. Richard Organ had died by 1638. The couple had no children, with Lucy dying in 1652. Richard Whitehead then married Cecilia, daughter of Richard Browne of Betchworth Castle, Surrey. Cecilia had been twice married already, and was the widow of firstly Robert Edolph of Hinxhill, Kent, and secondly of Sir Francis Knollys of Reading, Berkshire. Richard Whitehead died c. 1663. His will, dated 22 December 1659, was proved on 17 May 1664. His third wife outlived him, dying in 1677.

Parliament of England
Preceded by John More; Herbert Doddington	Member of Parliament for Lymington; 1628–1629; With: Herbert Doddington	Parliament suspended until 1640
Vacant Parliament suspended since 1629	Member of Parliament for Hampshire; 1640–1648; With: Sir Henry Wallop; Richard Norton	Succeeded by Richard Norton; Richard Major; John Hildesley
