= Ranulph Crewe =

English judge (1558–1646)

The Right Honourable Sir Ranulph Crewe
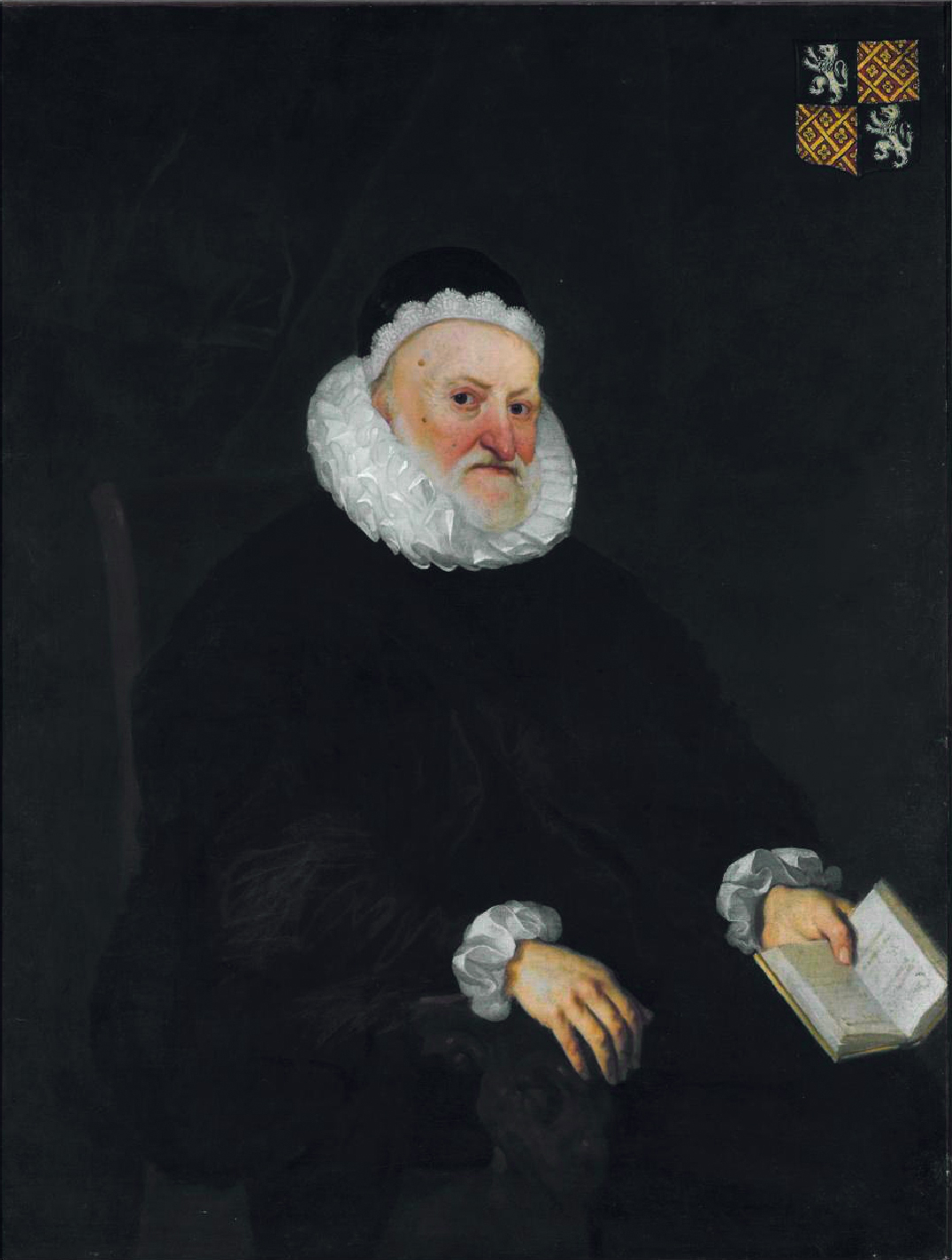
- Sir Ranulph Crewe, by Peter Lely

Lord Chief Justice of the King's Bench
- In office 1625–1626
- Preceded by: James Ley
- Succeeded by: Nicholas Hyde

Personal details
- Born: 1558
- Died: 3 January 1645-6 (aged 87-88) Westminster
- Resting place: Barthomley
- Education: Christ's College, Cambridge

Sir Ranulph (or Ranulphe, Randolph, or Randall) Crew(e) (1558 – 3 January 1646) was an English judge and Chief Justice of the King's Bench.

== Early life and career ==
Ranulph Crewe was the second son of John Crew of Nantwich, who is said to have been a tanner, by Alice, daughter of Humphrey Mainwaring. He attended Shrewsbury School and, in 1576, Christ's College, Cambridge, but did not take a degree. He was admitted a member of Lincoln's Inn on 13 November 1577, called to the bar on 8 November 1584, returned to parliament as junior member for Brackley, Northamptonshire, in 1597, elected a Bencher of Lincoln's Inn in 1600, and Autumn Reader there in 1602. The earliest reported case in which he was engaged was tried in the Queen's Bench in Hilary term 1597–8, when he acted as junior to the attorney-general, Coke. In 1604 he was selected by the House of Commons to state objections to the adoption of the new style of king of Great Britain in the conference with the lords.

== Involvement in leading trials ==
His name does not appear in the official list of returns to parliament after 1597. He was certainly, however, the member for Saltash in 1614, and was elected speaker (7 April). He was knighted in June, and took the degree of serjeant-at-law in July of the following year. In the address with which, according to custom, he opened the session in 1614, he enlarged upon the length of the royal pedigree, to which he gave a fabulous extension.

In January 1614–15, Crewe was appointed one of the commissioners for the examination, under torture, of the Puritan minister Edmond Peacham for high treason, in that his attacks, which were never published, on the King and his ministers could be construed as incitement to regicide and rebellion. Peacham refused to speak even after being tortured on the rack. Crewe concurred with the advice of the majority of the High Court judges that Peacham's unpublished writings clearly amounted to treason, although Coke in a celebrated ruling called Peacham's Case vehemently disagreed. Peacham was sent down to Somersetshire to stand his trial at the assizes. Crewe prosecuted, and Peacham was convicted. He was sentenced to death but allowed to die in prison.

Crewe's professional reputation was somewhat damaged by the Leicester boy Witch Trials, where he sat as an extra judge of assize. Nine women were hanged on the evidence of a young boy called John Smith whom Crewe, and his colleague Sir Humphrey Winch, found entirely credible, but whom King James soon after declared to be a fraud.

Crewe was a member of the commission which tried Richard Weston for the murder of Sir Thomas Overbury in 1615, and was concerned with Bacon and Montague in the prosecution of the Earl and Countess of Somerset as accessories before the fact to Overbury's murder in the following year. In 1621 he conducted the prosecution of Henry Yelverton, the attorney-general, for certain alleged misdemeanours in connection with patents. The same year Crewe prosecuted Sir Francis Mitchell for alleged corrupt practices in executing 'the commission concerning gold and silver thread,' conducted the impeachment of Sir John Bennet, judge of the Prerogative court, for corruption in his office, and materially contributed to the settlement of an important point in the law of impeachment. Edward Floyde, having published a libel on the Princess Palatine, was impeached by the commons, and sentenced to the pillory. The lords disputed the right of the commons to pass sentence upon the offender on two grounds : (1) that he was not a member of their house; (2) that the offence did not touch their privileges. At the conference which followed Crewe adduced a precedent from the reign of Henry IV in support of the contention of the lords, and the commons being able to produce no counter-precedent the question was quietly settled by the commons entering in the journal a minute to the effect that the proceedings against Floyde should not become a precedent. In 1624 Crewe presented part of the case against Lionel Cranfield, earl of Middlesex, on his impeachment. The same year he was appointed king's serjeant.

== Lord Chief Justice ==
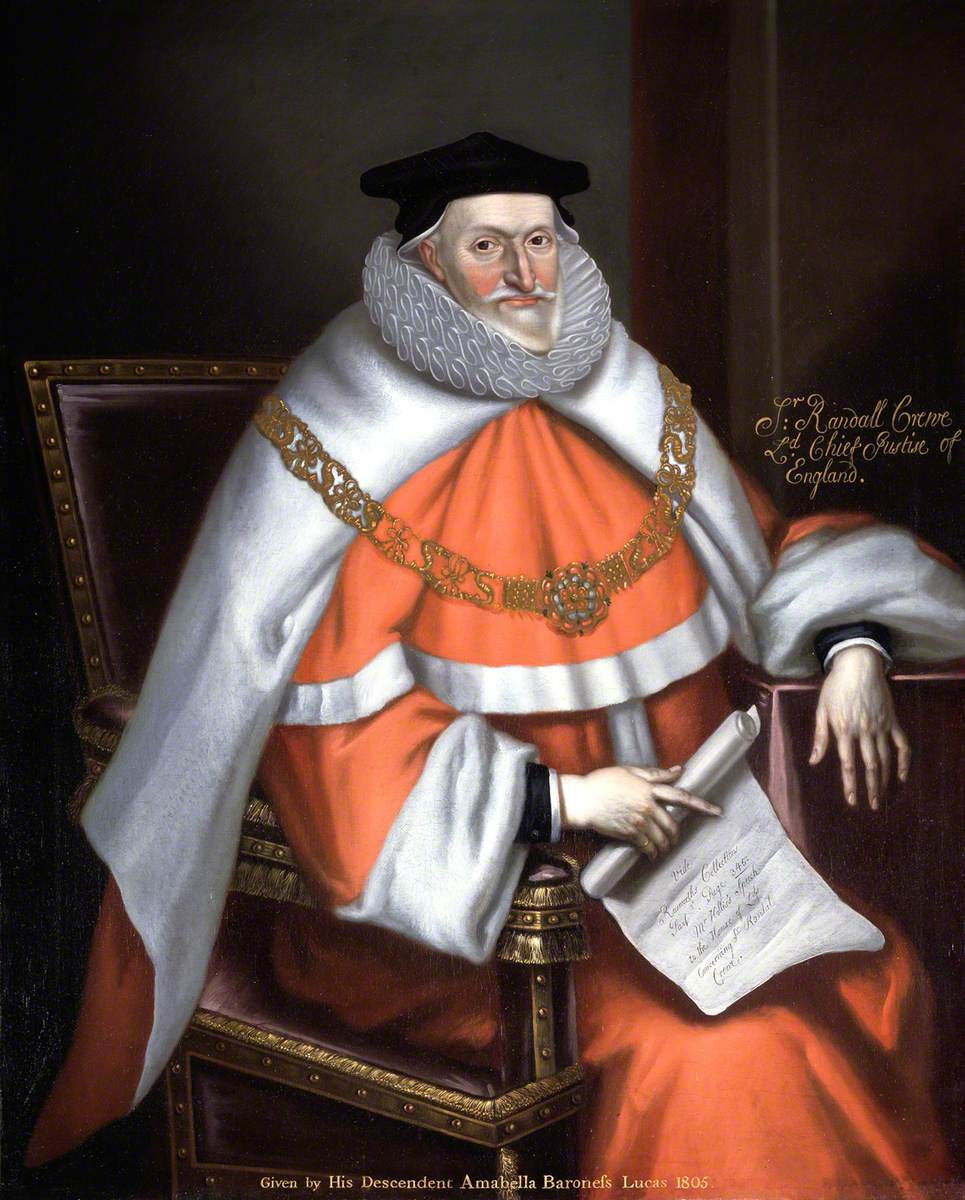
Crewe as Lord Chief Justice

The following year (26 January 1625) he was created chief justice of the king's bench by King James I. On 9 November 1626, he was removed by Charles I for having refused to subscribe to a document affirming the legality of forced loans. All his colleagues seem to have concurred with him, but he alone was punished.

=== The Oxford peerage case ===
The Crewe family is said to be among the most ancient in the kingdom, a fact the importance of which is not likely to have been underrated by Sir Ranulph, if we may judge by his eloquent prologue to the Oxford peerage case, decided 1625, which is one of the few passages of really fine prose to be found in the Law Reports. "Time" he said, "hath his revolutions, and there must be an end to all temporal things, finis rerum"... "Where," he asks, "is Bohun, where's Mowbray, where's Mortimer? Nay, which is more and most of all, where is Plantagenet? They are entombed in the urns and sepulchres of mortality. And yet let the name and dignity of De Vere stand so long as it pleaseth God."

== Retirement ==
From a letter written by him to the Duke of Buckingham (28 June 1628) it seems that he hoped to receive some compensation through Buckingham's support. On the assassination of Buckingham (24 August 1628) Crewe urged his suit upon the king himself, but without success. After the impeachment in 1641 of the judges who had affirmed the legality of Ship money, Denzil Holles moved the House of Lords to petition the king to compensate Crewe, who seems to have passed the rest of his days in retirement, partly in London, and partly at his seat, Crewe Hall, Barthomley, Cheshire, built by him upon an estate said to have belonged to his ancestors, which he purchased from Coke in 1608. Crewe Hall was garrisoned for the parliament, taken by Byron in December 1643, and retaken in the following February. A letter from Crewe to Sir Richard Browne at Paris, under date 10 April 1644, describing the growing exasperation of 'this plus quam civile bellum,' as he called it, and the devastation of the country, is preserved in the British Museum, and is printed in the Fairfax Correspondence. Crewe died at Westminster on 3 January 1645–6, and was buried on 5 June in a chapel built by himself at Barthomley.

== Private life ==
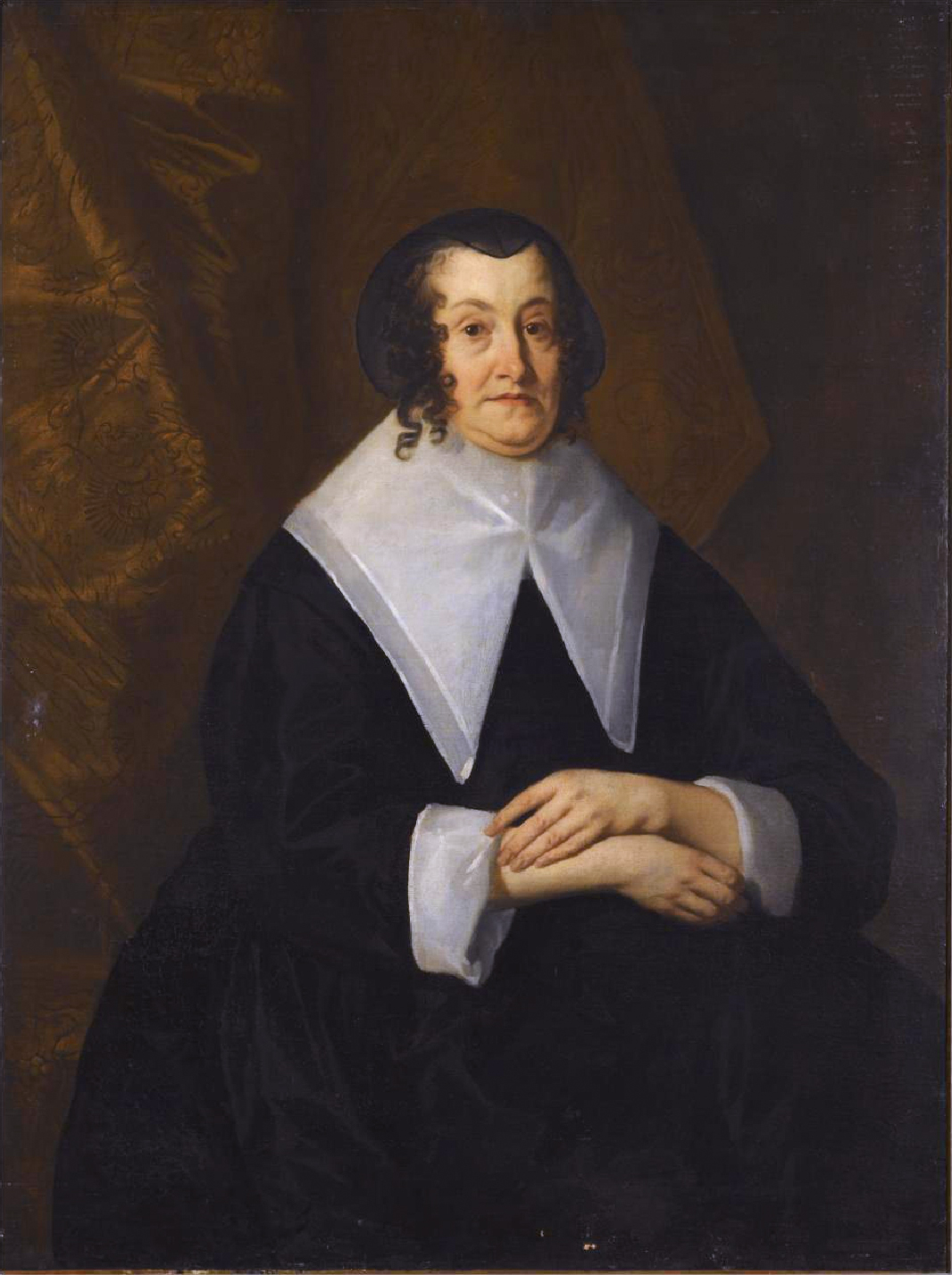
Crewe's second wife, Julia Fasey (Peter Lely)

He married twice:

1. on 20 July 1598, Julia, daughter and coheiress of John Clipsby or Clippesby of Clippesby, Norfolk, who died on 29 July 1603;
2. on 12 April 1607, Julia, daughter of Edward Fasey of London, relict of Sir Thomas Hesketh, knight, who died on 10 August 1629. Julia Fasey was the widow of a prosperous Gray's Inn lawyer with a flourishing practice. It enabled Ranulph to buy an estate at Barthomley in Cheshire from Sir Christopher Hatton.

By his first wife, he had two sons, Clipsby Crew and John Crew, who were both MPs.

Political offices
Preceded by Sir Edward Phelips	Speaker of the House of Commons; 1614	Succeeded by Sir Thomas Richardson
