= Thomas Hoby =

English diplomat and translator

Sir Thomas Hoby

Ambassador of the Kingdom of England to France
- In office 1566–1566
- Preceded by: Nicholas Wotton
- Succeeded by: Sir Nicolas Throckmorton

Personal details
- Born: 1530
- Died: 13 July 1566 (aged 35–36) Paris, France
- Spouse: Elizabeth Cooke (m. 1558)
- Relations: Sir Philip Hoby (brother); Peregrine Hoby (grandson)
- Children: 4, including Edward, Thomas
- Parent(s): William Hoby; Katherine Forden Hoby
- Education: St. John's College, Cambridge

Sir Thomas Hoby (1530 – 13 July 1566) was an English diplomat and translator.

== Early life ==
Hoby was born in 1530. He was the second son of William Hoby of Leominster, Herefordshire, by his second wife, Katherine, daughter of John Forden. He was a brother-in-law of William Cecil, Lord Burghley, the Queen's principal minister, and an uncle of Robert Cecil, 1st Earl of Salisbury, who succeeded his father as Secretary of State. Among his siblings was brother Sir William Hoby of Hayles.

He matriculated at St. John's College, Cambridge in 1546. Encouraged by his sophisticated half-brother, Sir Philip Hoby (later the English Ambassador to the Holy Roman Empire and Flanders), he subsequently visited France, Italy, and other foreign countries, and, as Roger Ascham states, "was many wayes well furnished with learning, and very expert in knowledge of divers tongues." His tour of Italy, which included visits to Calabria and Sicily and which he documented in his autobiography, is the most extensive known to have been undertaken by an Englishman in the 16th century. In this and other respects, it may be regarded as a pioneering Grand Tour.

== Career ==
Hoby translated Martin Bucer's Gratulation to the Church of England (1549), and Baldassare Castiglione's Il Cortegiano (1561). The latter translation of The Courtier, entitled The Courtyer of Count Baldessar Castilio, had great popularity and was one of the key books of the English Renaissance. It provided a philosophy of life for the Elizabethan era gentleman. A reading of its pages fitted him for the full assimilation of the elaborate refinements of the new Renaissance society. It furnished his imagination with the symbol of a completely developed individual, an individual who united ethical theory with spontaneity and richness of character.

On 9 March 1566 he was knighted at Greenwich, and was sent as Ambassador to France at the end of the month. At the time of his landing in Calais, on 9 April, a soldier at the town gate shot through the English flag in two places. Hoby demanded redress for the insult, and obtained it after some delay, but he was not permitted to view the new fortifications.

== Personal life ==
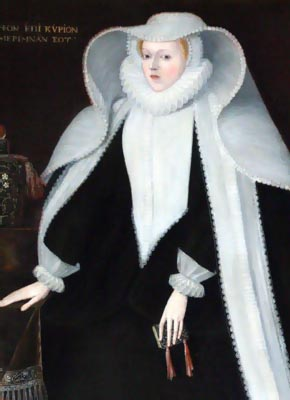
Portrait of Hoby's wife Elizabeth, at Bisham Abbey.

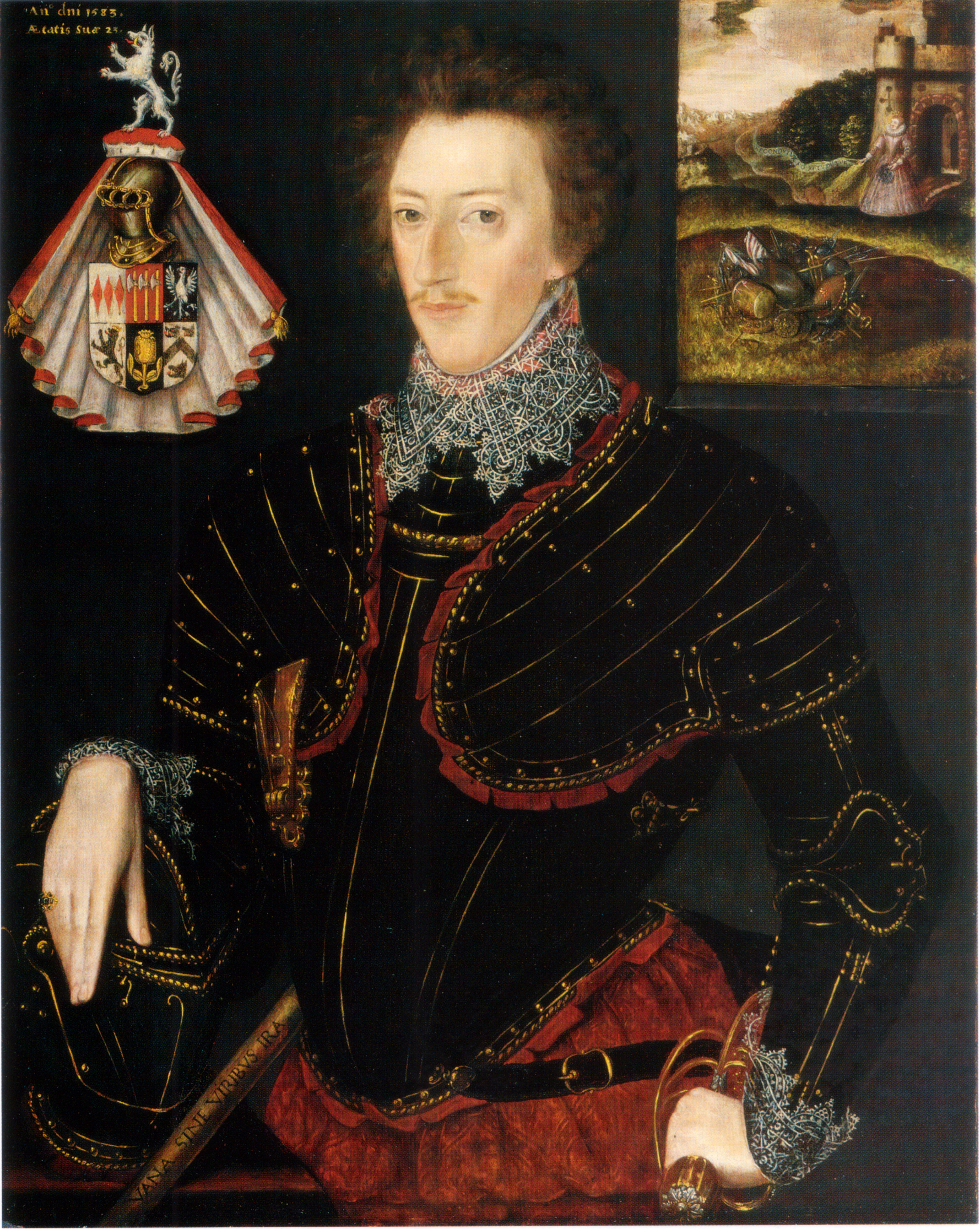
Portrait of Hoby's eldest son, Edward, in 1583

On 27 June 1558, Hoby married Elizabeth, the third daughter of Sir Anthony Cooke, of Gidea Hall, Essex. Elizabeth was a sister-in-law of Lord Burghley and a great friend of Queen Elizabeth I. After their marriage, they resided at Bisham Abbey in Berkshire and were the parents of two daughters, who died young, and two sons (both subsequently knighted), including:

- Edward Hoby (1560–1617), married Margaret Carey, a daughter of Henry Carey, 1st Baron Hunsdon (the cousin of Queen Elizabeth). After she died in 1605, he married Cicely Unton (d. 1618), the daughter of Sir Edward Unton and Lady Anne Seymour (a daughter of Edward Seymour, 1st Duke of Somerset and Anne Seymour, Duchess of Somerset).
- Thomas Posthumous Hoby (1566–1640), a Member of Parliament for Appleby, Scarborough, and Ripon, who married Margaret (née Dakins) Devereux Sidney (1571–1633), daughter and heiress of Arthur Dakins, already the widow of two men, of Walter Devereux (a younger brother of the Earl of Essex), and Thomas Sidney (a brother of the poet Philip Sidney).

He died in Paris on 13 July 1566, and was buried at Bisham, Berkshire, where his widow erected a monument to his memory and to that of his half-brother Sir Philip Hoby. (Note: The adults Elizabeth and Anne commemorated on the family tomb were not these daughters (who are depicted as children); they were rather the daughters which Hoby's wife, Elizabeth, had with her second husband Lord Russell. They had three children in total, Elizabeth Russell, Anne Russell (wife of Henry Somerset, 1st Marquess of Worcester) and Francis Russell, who died young.) His widow remarried in 1574, to John, Lord Russell, eldest surviving son and heir to Francis Russell, 2nd Earl of Bedford, but John died in 1584 before acceding to the Earldom of Bedford (which passed to his nephew, Edward in 1585).

=== Descendants ===
His eldest son, Edward, did not produce any children from his two marriages; however, he had a natural son, whom he recognized as his own and made him his heir: Peregrine Hoby (1602–1679) with Katherine Pinckney, a favourite of James I. Peregrine was himself the father of Sir Edward Hoby, 1st Baronet (1634–1675), whose baronetcy continued until the fifth Baronet died in 1766, and Thomas Hoby (1642–1706), an MP for Great Marlow and Salisbury

As his second son, Thomas, died without issue, he left his manor of Hackness to John Sydenham of Brympton in Somerset, the son of his first cousin Alice Hoby, daughter of Sir William Hoby of Hayles, who was Hoby's uncle. He made further bequests to other members of the Sydenham family, and he also left each of his servants three years' wages.
