= Sir Philip Hoby, 5th Baronet =

Irish clergyman

Sir Philip Hoby, 5th Baronet (c. 1716 – 29 June 1766) was a clergyman in the Church of Ireland during the 18th century.

== Biography ==
His elder brother was Sir Thomas Hoby, 4th Baronet (c. 1714–1744), MP for Great Marlow like their great-grandfather, Peregrine Hoby. Hoby was educated at Trinity College, Dublin. He was Prebendary of Kilmactalway at St Patrick's Cathedral, Dublin from 1743 to 1748; and Chancellor there from 1748. He was Dean of Ardfert from 1748 until his death.

Upon his death on 29 June 1766, the baronetcy became extinct.

Baronetage of England
Preceded by Thomas Hoby	Baronet (of Bisham); 1744–1766	Extinct
