= William Doddington =

English landowner and politician

Sir William Doddington (1572–1638) was an English landowner and politician who sat in the House of Commons from 1621 to 1622.

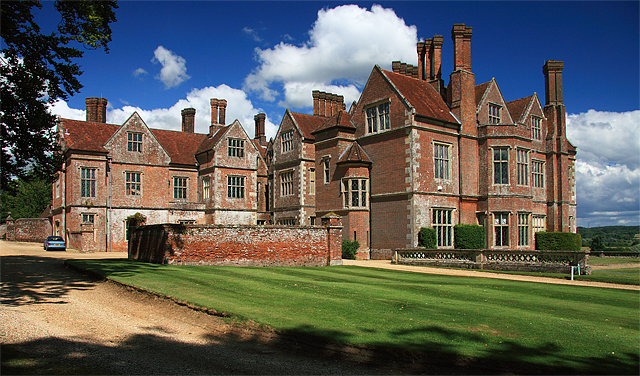
Breamore House, Hampshire, view from the south

Doddington was the son of William Dodington of Breamore House, Hampshire, and Christian Walsingham, widow of John Tamworth. In 1605, he was High Sheriff of Hampshire. In 1621, he was elected Member of Parliament for Lymington. He was holding the manor of South Charford in 1624 and in 1629 settled it on his son Herbert on his marriage. After Herbert died childless in 1633, Doddington held the manor again until his death in 1638, when it passed to his younger son John.

Doddington was noted for his charitable actions.

Doddington married Mary Herbert daughter of Sir John Herbert of, Neath Abbey, Castell-nedd, Glamorganshire. She brought him the manor of Candeston Castle. His daughter Katherine married Peregrine Hoby and they had four sons and one daughter. His daughter Ann married John Bulkeley.

Parliament of England
Preceded by Philip Fleming; Charles Thynne	Member of Parliament for Lymington; 1621; With: Henry Crompton	Succeeded by Nicholas Ferrar; John More
