= John Wyndham (of Norrington) =

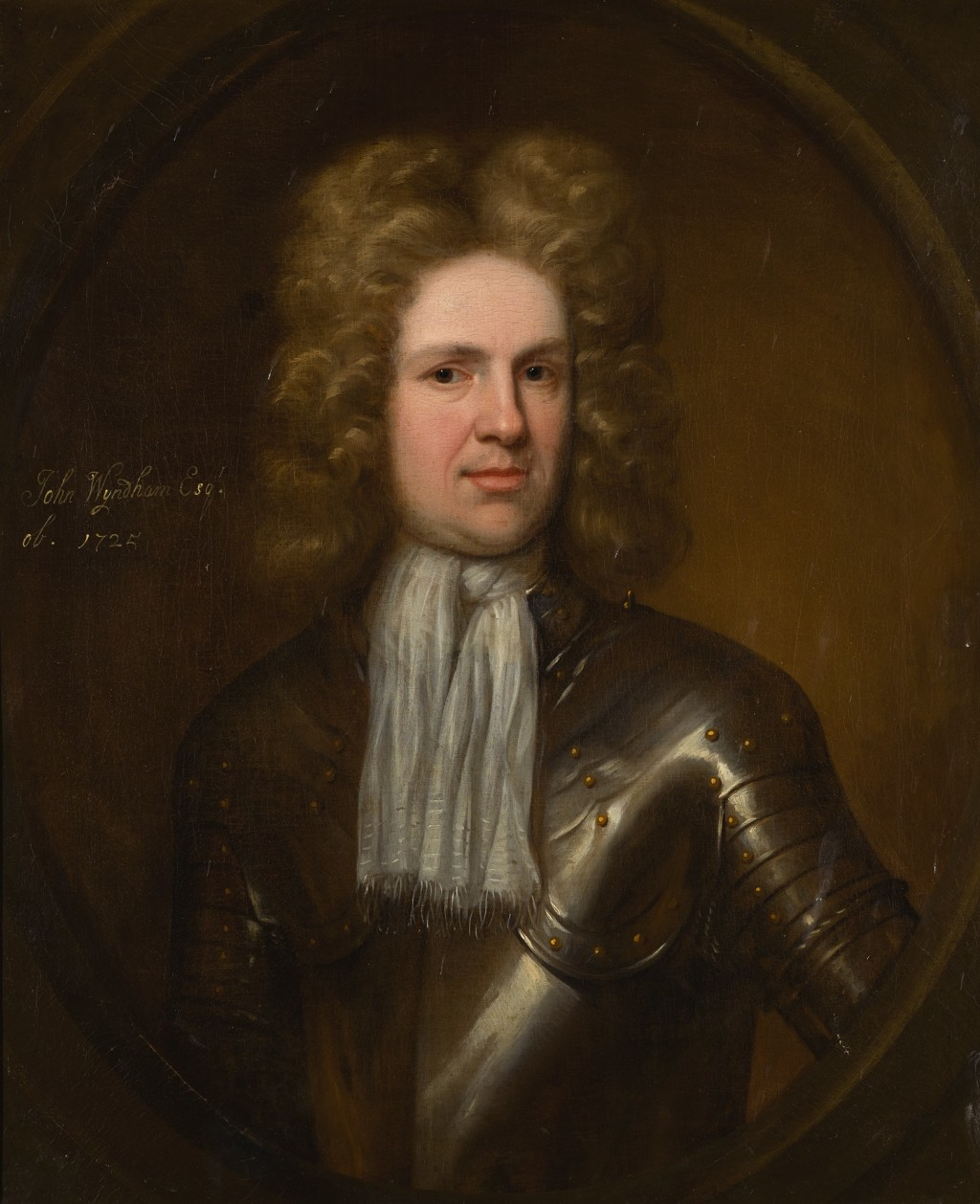

Member of the English Parliament for Salisbury
- In office 1681, 1685

John Wyndham (2 March 1648 – 29 February 1724) was the member of the Parliament of England for Salisbury for the parliaments of 1681 and 1685.
