= David Wrench =

David Wrench may refer to:

- David Wrench (rugby league) (born 1978), rugby league footballer
- David Wrench (rugby union) (1936–2018), rugby union player
- David Wrench (music producer), record producer, mixer, engineer, musician
