= John Borlase (died 1681) =

English politician

John Borlase (1650–1681), of Great Marlow, Buckinghamshire, was an English politician.

== Early life ==
Borlase was educated at Eton and Magdalen Hall, Oxford. His father was the MP, William Borlase. His mother was Joanna Bankes, daughter of Sir.John Bankes, Chief Justice of the Common Pleas.

== Career ==
He was a Member (MP) of the Parliament of England for Great Marlow in March 1679, October 1679 and 1681. During the Exclusion Crisis he was said to support Exclusion, and was marked by Anthony Ashley-Cooper, 1st Earl of Shaftesbury as "honest", in the sense of reliable. However he obtained leave to retire to the country, and took no part in the Exclusion debates, nor does he seem to have played any further part in Parliamentary business.
