= Sir Thomas Hoby, 4th Baronet =

English politician

Sir Thomas Hoby, 4th Baronet (after 1706 – 1 June 1744), of Bisham, Berkshire, was an English Member of Parliament (MP).

He was a Member of the Parliament of England for Great Marlow in the period 8 April 1732 – 1 June 1744.

Parliament of Great Britain
Preceded by Edmund Waller; George Robinson	Member of Parliament for Great Marlow; 1732–1744; With: Edmund Waller (1732–1741); Samuel Tufnell (1741–1744)	Succeeded by Samuel Tufnell; William Ockenden
Baronetage of England
Preceded by Thomas Hoby	Baronet (of Bisham); 1730–1744	Succeeded by Philip Hoby
