= Humphrey Winch =

Sixteenth century English member of Parliament

Sir Humphrey Winch (1555–1625) was an English-born politician and judge. He had a distinguished career in both Ireland and England, but his reputation was seriously damaged by the Leicester witch trials of 1616, which resulted in the hanging of several innocent women.

== Family ==
He was born in Bedfordshire, second son of John Winch (died 1598) of Northill. He married Cicely Onslow, daughter of Richard Onslow (died 1571), Speaker of the House of Commons, and his wife Catherine Harding. They had two surviving children, including Onslow, who married a sister of Sir John Burgoyne, 1st Baronet, and was the father of Sir Humphrey Winch, 1st Baronet. Later notable descendants included Anne, Duchess of Cumberland and Strathearn.

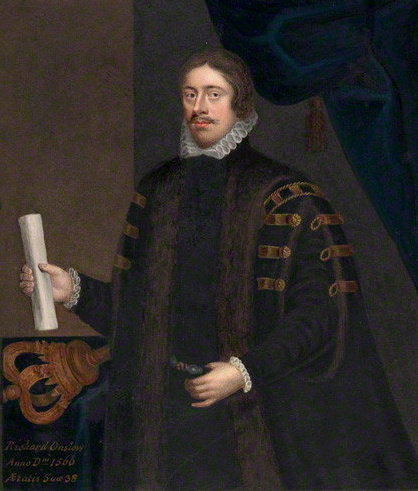
Richard Onslow, Speaker of the House of Commons and father-in-law of Humphrey Winch

== Political career ==
He matriculated from St John's College, Cambridge; was called to the Bar in 1581 and became a bencher of Lincoln's Inn in 1596. He enjoyed the patronage of Oliver St John, 3rd Baron St John of Bletso. Through St John's influence, he was elected to the House of Commons as MP for Bedford in 1593, and served in each successive Parliament up to 1606.

In the earlier part of his career in Parliament, he was identified with the Puritan faction in the Commons. He gave great offence to Queen Elizabeth I in 1593 by supporting a proposal by Sir Peter Wentworth, the chief spokesman in the Commons for the Puritans, to introduce a Bill to settle the royal succession, a subject on which the Queen absolutely forbade any debate in Parliament, let alone any attempt to legislate for it. His offence was compounded by the fact that the meetings to discuss the Bill were held in his barrister's chambers at Lincoln's Inn. Compared to the fate of Wentworth, who was sent to the Tower of London and died there three years later, Winch's punishment was mild enough: he was forbidden to leave London for a time, but allowed to continue to attend Parliament. His disgrace was temporary, but thereafter he confined his speeches in the Commons to non-contentious matters.

== Judge ==
In 1606, despite his earlier conflict with the Crown, he was recommended to King James I as a man who was suitable for judicial appointment, by reason of his legal ability and integrity. For this purpose, he was made a serjeant-at-law and knighted, then appointed Chief Baron of the Irish Exchequer.

He received glowing reports as a judge, being praised as "understanding and painstaking". Francis Bacon said that Winch's qualities of "quickness, industry and dispatch" made him a model for other judges to emulate. In 1607 he was one of four senior judges who became members of the King's Inns, thus helping to revive an institution which had become almost moribund. He was conscientious in going on assize and was regular in attendance at the Court of Castle Chamber (the Irish equivalent of Star Chamber). After two years he was promoted to the office of Lord Chief Justice of the King's Bench in Ireland.

Winch, like many (though by no means all) transplanted English officials disliked the Irish climate and complained of its effect on his health. He also grumbled about the lack of staff to support him and the "humiliating" fees he received (although he did receive an initial payment of £100 towards his expenses). From 1610 onwards he was lobbying for a speedy return to England. Despite the reluctance of the Dublin Government to lose such a valued Crown servant, he was transferred to the English Court of Common Pleas in 1611. He returned to Ireland on official business in 1613, and was regarded as an expert on Irish matters, sitting on the Privy Council committees on Irish affairs.

== Leicester witch trials ==
See main article: Leicester boy

Winch's illustrious reputation as a judge was dealt a serious blow by his conduct at the summer assizes in Leicester in 1616. Fifteen women had been charged with witchcraft on the sole evidence of a young boy called John Smith, who claimed that they had possessed him. The judges, Winch and Ranulph Crewe, found the boy to be a credible witness: while six of the accused were spared the death penalty in favour of a prison sentence, nine were condemned to death and hanged. A month after the hangings King James I visited Leicester. The King had always shown a keen interest in witchcraft, but, although he was a firm believer in the reality of witches, he could be sceptical about individual cases, and was quite shrewd in detecting impostors. He examined the boy John Smith and promptly declared him to be a fraud. The boy broke down and confessed that he had lied, and the five surviving convicts (one had already died) were released from prison.

== Death ==
Despite the damage to his reputation caused by the witchcraft trial's fiasco, Winch remained on the bench until he died suddenly at Chancery Lane from a stroke in February 1625. An impressive memorial was raised to him in St Mary's Church, Everton.

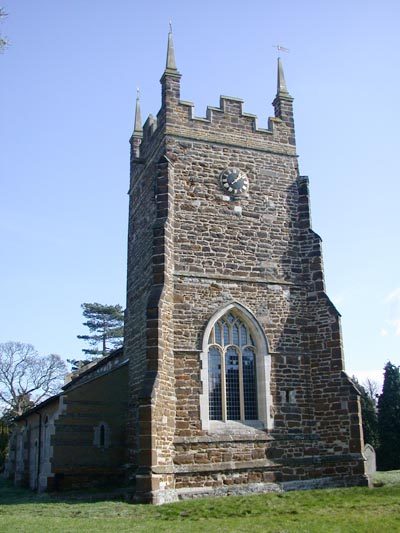
St Mary's Church, Everton, where Winch is buried

He apologised in his will to his wife for the "poor estate which I must leave her". She outlived him by three or four years. The inadequacy of his reward had been a constant theme of his for many years. Probably by the standards of Jacobean judges, his fortune was not large: but his estates were not negligible. In addition to Everton, he had an estate at Potton, Bedfordshire, and another at Gamlingay in Cambridgeshire.

Legal offices
Preceded by James Ley	Lord Chief Justice of Ireland; 1608–1611	Succeeded by John Denham
