= Herbert Doddington =

English politician

Herbert Doddington (died 1633) was an English politician who sat in the House of Commons from 1626 to 1629.

Doddington was the son of Sir William Doddington of Breamore House Hampshire and his wife Mary Herbert daughter of Sir John Herbert of Neath Abbey, Castell-nedd, Glamorganshire.

In 1626, Doddington was elected Member of Parliament for Lymington. He was re-elected MP for Lymington in 1628 and sat until 1629 when King Charles decided to rule without parliament for eleven years. On his marriage in 1629 his father settled on him the estate of South Charford, but he died in 1633.

Doddington married Elizabeth Colles, daughter of John Colles in 1629, but they had no children.

Parliament of England
Preceded by John Button; John Mills	Member of Parliament for Lymington; 1626–1629; With: John More 1626; Richard Whitehead	Parliament suspended until 1640
