= Breamore House =

Country house in Breamore, Hampshire, England

Coordinates: 50.9705°N 1.7839°W

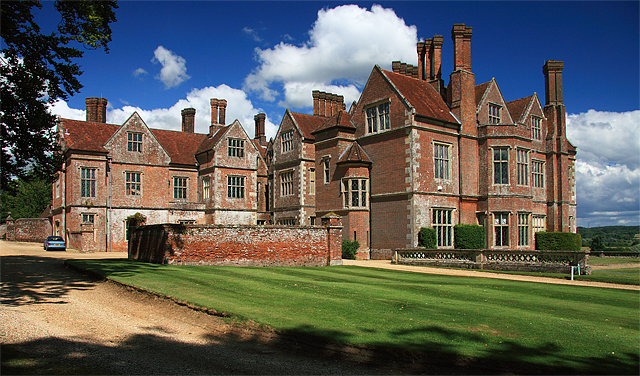
Breamore House, view from the south

Breamore House is an Elizabethan manor house noted for its fine collection of paintings and furniture and situated NW of Breamore village, north of Fordingbridge, Hampshire, England. Though it remains in private hands, it is open to visitors from April to October.

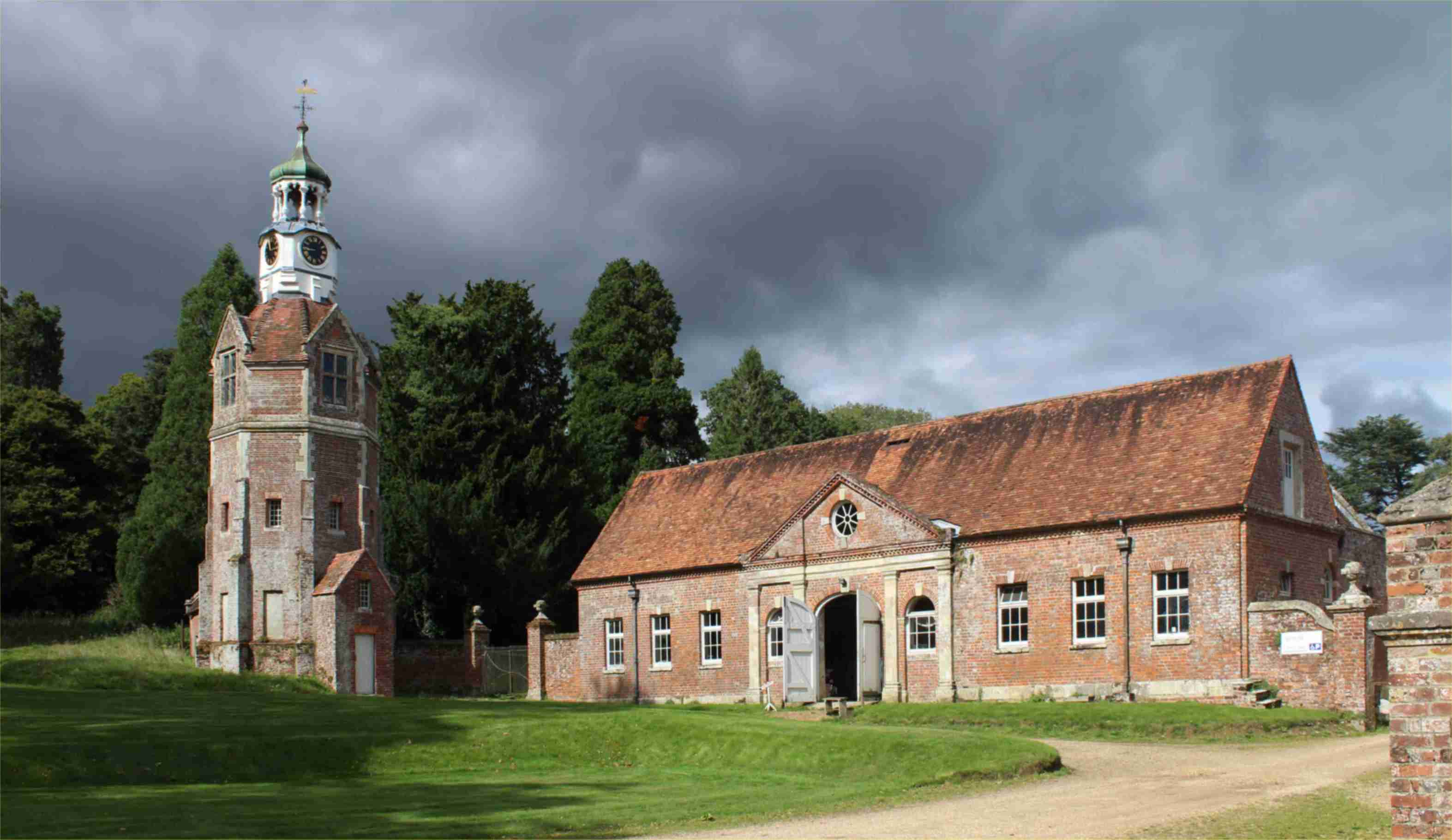
Breamore house stables and tower N of main house

Breamore House was completed in 1583 by the Dodington family, and was built on the site of Breamore Priory. The building underwent minor changes in the 18th century and underwent considerable restoration after a major fire in 1856.

Purchased in the 18th century by Sir Edward Hulse, Baronet, M.D., physician to Queen Anne and Kings George I and George II, the house is still inhabited by the Hulse family (see Hulse baronets).

After marriage with Dame Elizabeth, daughter of Sir Richard Levett, Lord Mayor of London and owner of Kew Palace, the Hulse family acquired many heirlooms of the Sussex Levetts, an ancient Norman family, which are on display in the house.

Levett's other daughter, Frances, married Thomas Lewis Esq. of St. Pierre, Monmouthshire, Wales; his daughter Mary married Abraham Blackborne, a London merchant who lived at Clapham, whose son, also named Abraham, vicar of Dagenham, married Frances Fanshawe, daughter of Thomas Fanshawe of Parsloes Manor.

Sir Edward Hulse's only daughter, Elizabeth, married John Calvert of Albury Hall, Hertfordshire in 1757. John Calvert was member of Parliament for Wendover in 1754 and later for Hertford. The wedding was performed by Abraham Blackborne, vicar of Dagenham, Essex. The brothers Thomas, Edward and Richard, sons of Sir Edward Hulse and his wife Elizabeth, all attended the University of Cambridge. A fourth son, Levett, died as an infant.

== Film Locations ==
Breamore House was used as one of the locations for the 2005 film Pride & Prejudice.

Breamore was also a filming location for HBO's 2009 special on Winston Churchill entitled Into the Storm, where the house stood in for Chequers, the home of the Prime Minister.
