= Hoby baronets =

Extinct baronetcy in the Baronetage of England

The Hoby Baronetcy, of Bisham in the County of Berkshire, was a title in the Baronetage of England. It was created on 12 July 1666 for Edward Hoby, the son of Peregrine Hoby (1602–1679), during his father's lifetime.

The fourth baronet sat as member of parliament for Great Marlow. The fifth baronet served as Dean of Ardfert; the title became extinct on his death in 1766.

== Hoby baronets, of Bisham (1666) ==
- Sir Edward Hoby, 1st Baronet (1634–1675)
- Sir John Hoby, 2nd Baronet (1635–1702), brother of the first baronet
- Sir Thomas Hoby, 3rd Baronet (1685–1730)
- Sir Thomas Hoby, 4th Baronet (died 1744)
- Sir Philip Hoby, 5th Baronet (c. 1716–1766)
