= List of MPs elected in the 1818 United Kingdom general election =

1818–1820 Parliament of the United Kingdom
←	1812–1818 Parliament	1820–1826 Parliament	→
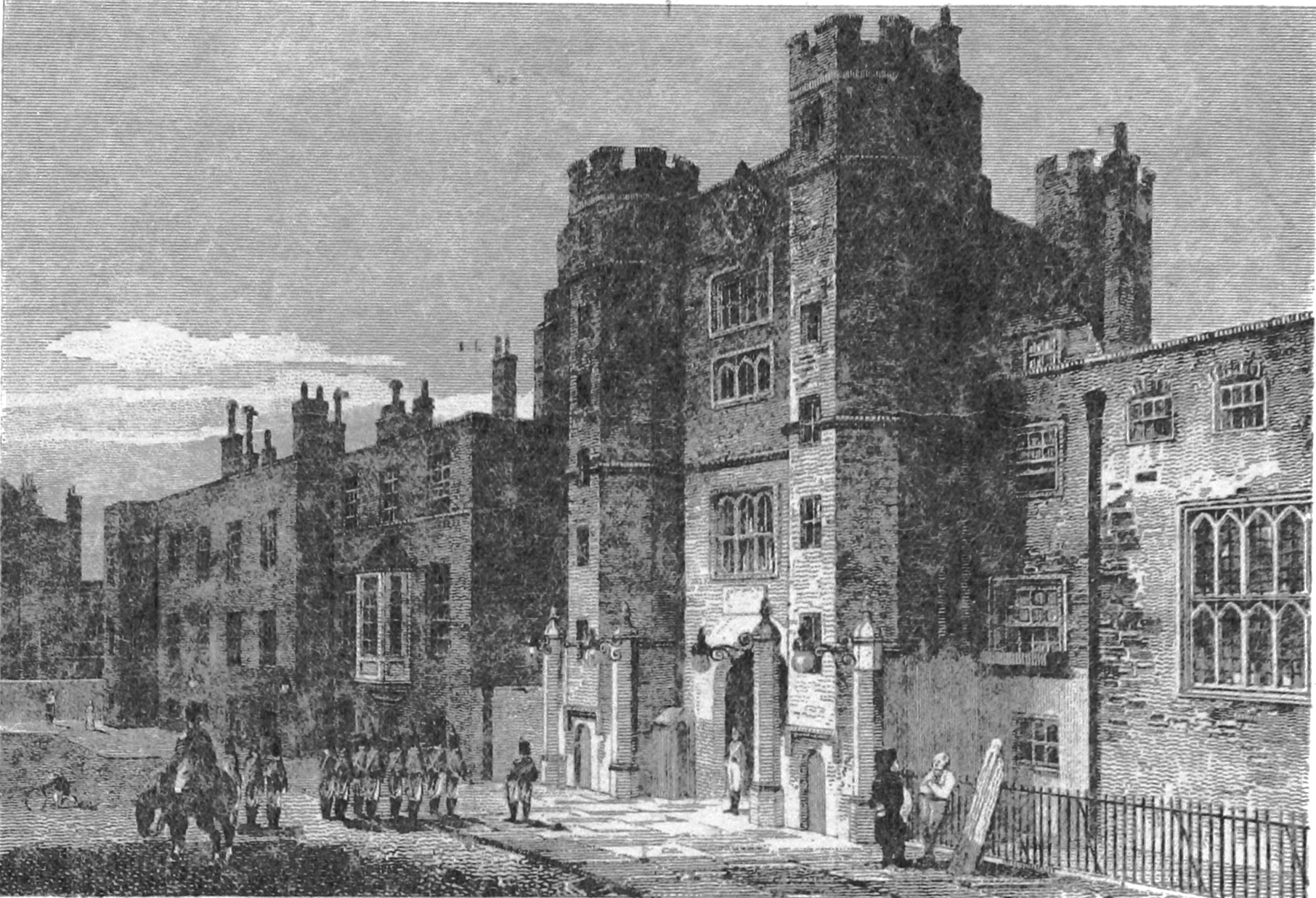
- The Palace of Westminster in 1820

Overview
- Legislative body: Parliament of the United Kingdom
- Jurisdiction: United Kingdom
- Meeting place: Palace of Westminster
- Term: 14 January 1819 – 29 February 1820
- Election: 1818 United Kingdom general election
- Government: Liverpool ministry

House of Commons
- Members: 638
- Speaker: Charles Abbot

House of Lords
- Lord Chancellor: John Scott, 1st Earl of Eldon

Crown-in-Parliament George III

Sessions
- 1st: 14 January 1819 – 13 July 1819
- 2nd: 23 November 1819 – 28 February 1820

List of MPs elected in the 1818 United Kingdom general election

This is a list of the Members of Parliament (MPs) elected to the House of Commons of the United Kingdom in the 1818 United Kingdom general election, the 6th Parliament of the United Kingdom, and their replacements returned at subsequent by-elections, arranged by constituency.

Table of contents:

A B C D E F G H I J K L M N O P Q R S T U V W X Y Z By-elections Changes

== A ==
Aberdeen Burghs (seat 1/1)	Joseph Hume	Whig
Aberdeenshire (seat 1/1)	James Ferguson	Tory
Abingdon (seat 1/1)	John Maberly	Whig
Aldborough (seat 1/2)	Henry Fynes	Tory
Aldborough (seat 2/2)	Granville Venables Vernon	Tory
Aldeburgh (seat 1/2)	Samuel Walker	Tory
Aldeburgh (seat 2/2)	Joshua Walker	Tory
Amersham (seat 1/2)	William Tyrwhitt-Drake	Tory
Amersham (seat 2/2)	Thomas Tyrwhitt-Drake	Tory
Andover (seat 1/2)	Thomas Assheton Smith I	Tory
Andover (seat 2/2)	Newton Fellowes	Whig
Anglesey (seat 1/1)	Berkeley Paget	Whig
Anstruther Easter Burghs (seat 1/1)	Alexander Maconochie – took office Replaced by Sir William Rae 1819	
County Antrim(seat 1/2)	Hon. John Bruce Richard O'Neill	Tory
County Antrim (seat 2/2)	Hugh Henry John Seymour	Tory
Appleby (seat 1/2)	George Fludyer – resigned Replaced by Adolphus John Dalrymple 1819	Tory
Appleby (seat 2/2)	Lucius Concannon	Whig
Argyllshire (seat 1/1)	Lord John Campbell	
Armagh (seat 1/1)	John Leslie Foster	Tory
County Armagh (seat 1/2)	Charles Brownlow	Whig
County Armagh (seat 2/2)	William Richardson	Tory
Arundel (seat 1/2)	Lord Henry Howard-Molyneux-Howard	Whig
Arundel (seat 2/2)	Sir Arthur Leary Piggott – died Replaced by Robert Blake 1819	
Ashburton (seat 1/2)	Sir Lawrence Vaughan Palk	
Ashburton (seat 2/2)	John Singleton Copley	
Athlone (seat 1/1)	John Gordon	
Aylesbury (seat 1/2)	George Nugent-Grenville	Whig
Aylesbury (seat 2/2)	William Rickford	Whig
Ayr Burghs (seat 1/1)	Thomas Francis Kennedy	Whig
Ayrshire (seat 1/1)	James Montgomerie	
== B ==
Banbury (seat 1/1)	Frederick Sylvester North Douglas – died Replaced by Heneage Legge 1819	
Bandon	Augustus Clifford	Whig
Banffshire (seat 1/1)	The Earl Fife	
Barnstaple (seat 1/2)	Sir Manasseh Masseh Lopes	Tory
Barnstaple (seat 2/2)	Francis Ommanney	
Bath (seat 1/2)	Lord John Thynne	
Bath (seat 2/2)	Charles Palmer	
Beaumaris (seat 1/1)	Thomas Lewis	
Bedford (seat 1/2)	Lord George Russell	Whig
Bedford (seat 2/2)	William Henry Whitbread	Whig
Bedfordshire (seat 1/2)	Marquess of Tavistock	Whig
Bedfordshire (seat 2/2)	Sir John Osborn, 5th Bt	Tory
Belfast	Arthur Chichester	Tory
Bere Alston (seat 1/2)	Hon. Josceline Percy	
Bere Alston (seat 2/2)	Lord Lovaine	
Berkshire (seat 1/2)	Hon. Richard Neville	Whig
Berkshire (seat 2/2)	Charles Dundas	Whig
Berwickshire (seat 1/1)	Sir John Marjoribanks	Tory
Berwick-upon-Tweed (seat 1/2)	Alexander Allan	
Berwick-upon-Tweed (seat 2/2)	Henry Heneage St Paul	
Beverley (seat 1/2)	John Wharton	Whig
Beverley (seat 2/2)	Robert Christie Burton	Tory
Bewdley (seat 1/1)	Wilson Roberts	Tory
Bishops Castle (seat 1/2)	William Clive	
Bishops Castle (seat 2/2)	John Robinson – died Replaced by Douglas James William Kinnaird 1819	
Bletchingley (seat 1/2)	Matthew Russell – sat for Saltash; Replaced by Sir William Curtis 1819	
Bletchingley (seat 2/2)	George Tennyson – resigned Replaced by Marquess of Titchfield 1819	
Bodmin (seat 1/2)	Thomas Bradyll	
Bodmin (seat 2/2)	Davies Giddy	
Boroughbridge (seat 1/2)	Marmaduke Lawson	Whig
Boroughbridge (seat 2/2)	George Mundy	Tory
Bossiney (seat 1/2)	Hon. James Stuart-Wortley – sat for Yorkshire; Replaced by John William Ward 1819	Tory; Tory
Bossiney (seat 2/2)	Sir Compton Domvile	
Boston (seat 1/2)	William Alexander Madocks	
Boston (seat 2/2)	Peter Robert Drummond Burrell	
Brackley (seat 1/2)	Henry Wrottesley	Tory
Brackley (seat 2/2)	Robert Haldane Bradshaw	Tory
Bramber (seat 1/2)	John Irving	
Bramber (seat 2/2)	William Wilberforce	Independent
Brecon (seat 1/1)	George Gould Morgan	Tory
Breconshire (seat 1/1)	Thomas Wood	Tory
Bridgnorth (seat 1/2)	Sir Thomas Tyrwhitt Jones	
Bridgnorth (seat 2/2)	Thomas Whitmore	
Bridgwater (seat 1/2)	William Astell	
Bridgwater (seat 2/2)	George Pocock	
Bridport (seat 1/2)	Henry Charles Sturt	Tory
Bridport (seat 2/2)	Sir Horace St Paul, Bt	
Bristol (seat 1/2)	Richard Hart Davis	Tory
Bristol (seat 2/2)	Edward Protheroe	Whig
Buckingham (seat 1/2)	Sir George Nugent, 1st Bt.	
Buckingham (seat 2/2)	William Henry Fremantle	
Buckinghamshire (seat 1/2)	Marquess of Chandos|	
Buckinghamshire (seat 2/2)	William Selby Lowndes	
Bury St Edmunds (seat 1/2)	The Earl of Euston	
Bury St Edmunds (seat 2/2)	Hon. Arthur Upton	
Buteshire (seat 0/0)	Alternated with Caithness. No representation in 1818	
== C ==
Caernarvon Boroughs (seat 1/1)	Hon. Sir Charles Paget	
Caernarvonshire (seat 1/1)	Robert Williams	
Caithness (seat 1/1)	George Sinclair	Whig
Callington (seat 1/2)	Hon. Edward Pyndar Lygon	Tory
Callington (seat 2/2)	Sir Christopher Robinson	Tory
Calne (seat 1/2)	James Macdonald	
Calne (seat 2/2)	Hon. James Abercromby	Whig
Cambridge (seat 1/2)	Edward Finch – resigned Replaced by Frederick William Trench 1819	Tory; Tory
Cambridge (seat 2/2)	Robert Manners	Tory
Cambridgeshire (seat 1/2)	Lord Charles Manners	
Cambridgeshire (seat 2/2)	Lord Francis Osborne	Tory
Cambridge University (seat 1/2)	John Henry Smyth	Whig
Cambridge University (seat 2/2)	The Viscount Palmerston	Tory
Camelford (seat 1/2)	Mark Milbank – void Election.. Replaced by John Stewart 1819	Whig; Tory
Camelford (seat 2/2)	John Bushby Maitland Replaced by Lewis Allsopp	Whig; Tory
Canterbury (seat 1/2)	Edward Bligh	Whig
Canterbury (seat 2/2)	Stephen Rumbold Lushington	Tory
Cardiff Boroughs (seat 1/1)	Lord Patrick Crichton-Stuart	
Cardigan Boroughs (seat 1/1)	Pryse Pryse	
Cardiganshire (seat 1/1)	William Edward Powell	Tory
Carlisle (seat 1/2)	Sir James Graham, 1st Bt	Tory
Carlisle (seat 2/2)	John Christian Curwen	Whig
Carlow (seat 1/1)	Charles Harvey-Saville-Onley	Tory
County Carlow (seat 1/2)	Sir Ulysses Burgh	Tory
County Carlow (seat 2/2)	Henry Bruen	Tory
Carmarthen (seat 1/1)	John Frederick Campbell	
Carmarthenshire (seat 1/1)	Lord Robert Seymour	Tory
Carrickfergus (seat 1/1)	Earl of Belfast	Tory
Cashel (seat 1/1)	Richard Pennefather – resigned Replaced by Ebenezer John Collett 1819	Tory
Castle Rising (seat 1/2)	Earl of Rocksavage	Tory
Castle Rising (seat 2/2)	Fulk Greville Howard	Tory
County Cavan (seat 1/2)	John Maxwell-Barry	Tory
County Cavan (seat 2/2)	Nathaniel Sneyd	Tory
Cheshire (seat 1/2)	Davies Davenport	
Cheshire (seat 2/2)	Wilbraham Egerton	Tory
Chester (seat 1/2)	Viscount Belgrave	
Chester (seat 2/2)	Thomas Grosvenor	
Chichester (seat 1/2)	Earl of March – succeeded to peerage Replaced by Lord John George Lennox 1819	Tory
Chichester (seat 2/2)	William Huskisson	Tory
Chippenham (seat 1/2)	William Miles	Tory
Chippenham (seat 2/2)	Marquess of Blandford	
Christchurch (seat 1/2)	William Sturges Bourne	Tory
Christchurch (seat 2/2)	George Henry Rose	Tory
Cirencester (seat 1/2)	Joseph Cripps	Tory
Cirencester (seat 2/2)	Henry Bathurst	Tory
Clackmannanshire (seat 1/1)	Alternated with Kinross-shire. Unrepresented in this Parliament	
County Clare (seat 1/2)	William Vesey-FitzGerald	Tory
County Clare (seat 2/2)	Sir Edward O'Brien, 4th Baronet	Whig
Clitheroe (seat 1/2)	Hon. William Cust	Tory
Clitheroe (seat 2/2)	Hon. Robert Curzon	Tory
Clonmel (seat 1/1)	William Bagwell – resigned Replaced by John Kiely 1819	Tory; Tory
Cockermouth (seat 1/2)	John Henry Lowther	Tory
Cockermouth (seat 2/2)	Sir John Beckett	Tory
Colchester (seat 1/2)	Daniel Whittle Harvey	Radical
Colchester (seat 2/2)	James Beckford Wildman	Tory
Coleraine (seat 1/1)	John Poo Beresford	Tory
Corfe Castle (seat 1/2)	George Bankes	Tory
Corfe Castle (seat 2/2)	Henry Bankes	Tory
Cork (seat 1/2)	Sir Nicholas Colthurst, Bt	Tory
Cork (seat 2/2)	Hon. Christopher Hely-Hutchinson	Whig
County Cork (seat 1/2)	Viscount Kingsborough	Whig
County Cork (seat 2/2)	Viscount Ennismore	
Cornwall (seat 1/2)	John Hearle Tremayne	Tory
Cornwall (seat 2/2)	Sir William Lemon, Bt	Whig
Coventry (seat 1/2)	Edward Ellice	Whig
Coventry (seat 2/2)	Peter Moore	
Cricklade (seat 1/2)	Joseph Pitt	
Cricklade (seat 2/2)	Robert Gordon	Whig
Cromartyshire (seat 1/1)	Roderick Macleod	
Cumberland (seat 1/2)	Viscount Morpeth	Tory
Cumberland (seat 2/2)	John Lowther	Tory
== D ==
Dartmouth (seat 1/2)	John Bastard	Tory
Dartmouth (seat 2/2)	Arthur Howe Holdsworth – resigned Replaced by Charles Milne Ricketts 1820	
Denbigh Boroughs (seat 1/1)	John Wynne Griffith	Whig
Denbighshire (seat 1/1)	Sir Watkin Williams-Wynn, 5th Baronet	
Derby (seat 1/2)	Henry Cavendish	Whig
Derby (seat 2/2)	Thomas William Coke	
Derbyshire (seat 1/2)	Lord George Cavendish	Whig
Derbyshire (seat 2/2)	Edward Miller Mundy	Tory
Devizes (seat 1/2)	John Pearse	
Devizes (seat 2/2)	Thomas Grimston Estcourt	
Devon (seat 1/2)	Edmund Pollexfen Bastard	Tory
Devon (seat 2/2)	Viscount Ebrington	Whig
County Donegal (seat 1/2)	Earl of Mount Charles	Tory
County Donegal (seat 2/2)	George Vaughan Hart	–
Dorchester (seat 1/2)	Samuel Shepherd – took office Replaced by Charles Warren 1819	
Dorchester (seat 2/2)	Robert Williams	
Dorset (seat 1/2)	Edward Berkeley Portman	
Dorset (seat 2/2)	William Morton Pitt	
Dover (seat 1/2)	John Jackson	
Dover (seat 2/2)	Edward Bootle-Wilbraham	
County Down (seat 1/2)	Lord Arthur Moyses William Hill	Whig
County Down (seat 2/2)	Robert Stewart, Viscount Castlereagh	Tory
Downpatrick	Viscount Glerawly	Tory
Downton (seat 1/2)	Viscount Folkestone – sat for Salisbury; Replaced by Bartholomew Bouverie 1819	Whig; Whig
Downton (seat 2/2)	Sir William Scott – sat for Oxford University; Replaced by Sir Thomas Brooke Pechell 1819	Tory; Tory
Drogheda	Henry Meade Ogle	Tory
Droitwich (seat 1/2)	The Earl of Sefton	Whig
Droitwich (seat 2/2)	Andrew Foley – died Replaced by Thomas Foley 1819	Whig; Whig
Dublin (seat 1/2)	Robert Shaw	Tory
Dublin (seat 2/2)	Rt Hon. Henry Grattan	Whig
County Dublin (seat 1/2)	Hans Hamilton	Tory
County Dublin (seat 2/2)	Richard Talbot	Whig
Dublin University	William Plunket	Whig
Dumfries Burghs (seat 1/1)	Lord William Douglas	
Dumfriesshire (seat 1/1)	Sir William Johnstone Hope	
Dunbartonshire (seat 1/1)	Archibald Campbell Colquhoun	
Dundalk	Gerrard Callaghan	Tory
Dungannon	Hon. Thomas Knox	
Dungarvan	Hon. George Walpole	Whig
Dunwich (seat 1/2)	Michael Barne	
Dunwich (seat 2/2)	The Lord Huntingfield – resigned Replaced by William Alexander Mackinnon 1819	
Durham (City of) (seat 1/2)	Richard Wharton	Tory
Durham (City of) (seat 2/2)	Michael Angelo Taylor	Whig
Durham (County) (seat 1/2)	John George Lambton	Radical
Durham (County) (seat 2/2)	William Vane Powlett	Whig
Dysart Burghs (seat 1/1)	Sir Ronald Crauford Ferguson	Whig
== E ==
East Grinstead (seat 1/2)	The Hon. Charles Jenkinson	
East Grinstead (seat 2/2)	Lord Strathavon	
East Looe (seat 1/2)	Sir Edward Buller	Tory
East Looe (seat 2/2)	Thomas Potter Macqueen	Tory
East Retford (seat 1/2)	William Evans	
East Retford (seat 2/2)	Samuel Crompton	
Edinburgh (seat 1/1)	William Dundas	
Edinburghshire (seat 1/1)	Sir George Clerk	
Elgin Burghs (seat 1/1)	Robert Grant	
Elginshire (seat 1/1)	Francis William Grant	Tory
Ennis	Spencer Perceval	Tory
Enniskillen	Richard Magenis	Tory
Essex (seat 1/2)	John Archer Houblon	
Essex (seat 2/2)	Charles Callis Western	
Evesham (seat 1/2)	William Rouse-Boughton; Replaced by Sir Charles Cockerell	
Evesham (seat 2/2)	Humphrey Howorth	Whig
Exeter (seat 1/2)	William Courtenay	
Exeter (seat 2/2)	Robert William Newman	
Eye (seat 1/2)	Robert Gifford	
Eye (seat 2/2)	Mark Singleton	
== F ==
County Fermanagh (seat 1/2)	Mervyn Archdall	Tory
County Fermanagh (seat 2/2)	Hon. Galbraith Lowry Cole	Tory
Fife (seat 1/1)	William Wemyss	
Flint Boroughs (seat 1/1)	William Shipley	
Flintshire (seat 1/1)	Sir Thomas Mostyn	
Forfarshire (seat 1/1)	William Maule	
Fowey (seat 1/2)	George Lucy – unseated on petition Replaced by Viscount Valletort 1818 – died Replaced by Mathias Attwood 1819 – unseated on petition Replaced by Viscount Valletort 1819	Tory
Fowey (seat 2/2)	Hon. James Hamilton Stanhope	Tory
== G ==
Galway	Valentine Blake	Tory
County Galway (seat 1/2)	James Daly	Tory
County Galway (seat 2/2)	Richard Martin	Tory
Gatton (seat 1/2)	Abel Rous Dottin	
Gatton (seat 2/2)	John Fleming	
Glamorganshire (seat 1/1)	John Edwards	
Glasgow Burghs (seat 1/1)	Alexander Houstoun	
Gloucester (seat 1/2)	Robert Bransby Cooper	Tory
Gloucester (seat 2/2)	Edward Webb	Whig
Gloucestershire (seat 1/2)	Lord Edward Somerset	Tory
Gloucestershire (seat 2/2)	Sir Berkeley Guise, Bt	Whig
Grampound (seat 1/2)	John Innes	
Grampound (seat 2/2)	Alexander Robertson	
Grantham (seat 1/2)	Edward Cust	
Grantham (seat 2/2)	Sir William Earle Welby, Bt	
Great Bedwyn (seat 1/2)	Sir John Nicholl	Tory
Great Bedwyn (seat 2/2)	John Jacob Buxton	Tory
Great Grimsby (seat 1/2)	John Nicholas Fazakerley	
Great Grimsby (seat 2/2)	Charles Tennyson	
Great Marlow (seat 1/2)	Pascoe Grenfell	Whig
Great Marlow (seat 2/2)	Owen Williams	Whig
Great Yarmouth (seat 1/2)	Thomas William Anson – raised to peerage Replaced by George Anson 1819	
Great Yarmouth (seat 2/2)	Charles Edmund Rumbold	
Guildford (seat 1/2)	William Draper Best –took office Replaced by Charles Baring Wall 1819	Tory
Guildford (seat 2/2)	Arthur Onslow	Tory
== H ==
Haddington Burghs (seat 1/1)	Dudley North	Whig
Haddingtonshire (seat 1/1)	Sir James Suttie	
Hampshire (seat 1/2)	Thomas Freeman Heathcote	
Hampshire (seat 2/2)	William John Chute	
Harwich (seat 1/2)	Nicholas Vansittart	Tory
Harwich (seat 2/2)	Charles Bathurst	
Haslemere (seat 1/2)	Robert Ward	Tory
Haslemere (seat 2/2)	Charles Long	Tory
Hastings (seat 1/2)	James Dawkins	
Hastings (seat 2/2)	George Peter Holford	
Haverfordwest (seat 1/1)	William Henry Scourfield	
Hedon (seat 1/2)	Edmund Turton	
Hedon (seat 2/2)	Robert Farrand	Whig
Helston (seat 1/2)	Lord James Townshend	Tory
Helston (seat 2/2)	Harrington Hudson	
Hereford (seat 1/2)	Thomas Powell Symonds – died Replaced by Richard Philip Scudamore 1819	
Hereford (seat 2/2)	Viscount Eastnor	
Herefordshire (seat 1/2)	Sir Robert Price, Bt	Whig
Herefordshire (seat 2/2)	Sir John Cotterell, Bt	Tory
Hertford (seat 1/2)	Viscount Cranborne	Tory
Hertford (seat 2/2)	Nicolson Calvert	Whig
Hertfordshire (seat 1/2)	Thomas Brand – succeeded to peerage Replaced by William Lamb 1819	Whig; Whig
Hertfordshire (seat 2/2)	Sir John Sebright, Bt	Whig
Heytesbury (seat 1/2)	George James Welbore Agar-Ellis	
Heytesbury (seat 2/2)	William Henry John Scott	
Higham Ferrers (seat 1/1)	William Plumer	Whig
Hindon (seat 1/2)	William Beckford	Whig
Hindon (seat 2/2)	Frederick Gough-Calthorpe	Whig
Honiton (seat 1/2)	Hon. Peregrine Cust	
Honiton (seat 2/2)	Samuel Crawley	
Horsham (seat 1/2)	George Phillips	
Horsham (seat 2/2)	Robert Hurst	Whig
Huntingdon (seat 1/2)	William Augustus Montagu	
Huntingdon (seat 2/2)	John Calvert	
Huntingdonshire (seat 1/2)	Lord Frederick Montagu	
Huntingdonshire (seat 2/2)	William Henry Fellowes	
Hythe (seat 1/2)	John Bladen Taylor – resigned Replaced by Samuel Jones Loyd 1819	
Hythe (seat 2/2)	Sir John Perring	
== I ==
Ilchester (seat 1/2)	Sir Isaac Coffin, Bt.	Whig
Ilchester (seat 2/2)	John William Drage Merest	Whig
Inverness Burghs (seat 1/1)	George Cumming	Tory
Inverness-shire (seat 1/1)	Charles Grant	Tory
Ipswich (seat 1/2)	William Newton	
Ipswich (seat 2/2)	Robert Alexander Crickitt	
== K ==
Kent (seat 1/2)	Sir Edward Knatchbull – died Replaced by Sir Edward Knatchbull 1819	Tory
Kent (seat 2/2)	William Philip Honywood	Whig
County Kerry (seat 1/2)	James Crosbie	
County Kerry (seat 2/2)	Rt Hon. Maurice Fitzgerald	Whig
County Kildare (seat 1/2)	Lord William Charles O'Brien Fitzgerald 1814	Whig
County Kildare (seat 2/2)	Robert La Touche	Whig
Kilkenny (seat 1/1)	Charles Harward Blunden 1814	
County Kilkenny (seat 1/2)	Hon. Frederick Ponsonby	Whig
County Kilkenny (seat 2/2)	Hon. James Butler	Whig
Kincardineshire (seat 1/1)	George Harley Drummond	
King's County (seat 1/2)	John Clere Parsons	Tory
King's County (seat 2/2)	Thomas Bernard (senior)	Tory
King's Lynn (seat 1/2)	Lord Walpole	
King's Lynn (seat 2/2)	Sir Martin ffolkes, Bt	
Kingston upon Hull (seat 1/2)	John Mitchell	Tory
Kingston upon Hull (seat 2/2)	James Graham	Whig
Kinross-shire (seat 0/0)	Thomas Graham – died Replaced by George Edward Graham 1819	
Kinsale (seat 1/1)	George Coussmaker	
Kirkcudbright Stewartry (seat 1/1)	James Dunlop	
Knaresborough (seat 1/2)	Sir James Mackintosh	Whig
Knaresborough (seat 2/2)	George Tierney	Whig
== L ==
Lanarkshire (seat 1/1)	Lord Archibald Hamilton	Whig
Lancashire (seat 1/2)	Lord Stanley	
Lancashire (seat 2/2)	John Blackburne	
Lancaster (seat 1/2)	John Gladstone	Tory
Lancaster (seat 2/2)	Gabriel Doveton	Whig
Launceston (seat 1/2)	Pownoll Bastard Pellew	Tory
Launceston (seat 2/2)	James Brogden	Tory
Leicester (seat 1/2)	Thomas Babington	
Leicester (seat 2/2)	Thomas Pares	
Leicestershire (seat 1/2)	Lord Robert William Manners	
Leicestershire (seat 2/2)	Charles March Phillipps	
County Leitrim (seat 1/2)	Luke White	
County Leitrim (seat 2/2)	John La Touche	
Leominster (seat 1/2)	John Lubbock	
Leominster (seat 2/2)	Sir William Cuningham-Fairlie	
Lewes (seat 1/2)	George Shiffner	
Lewes (seat 2/2)	Sir John Shelley	
Lichfield (seat 1/2)	George Granville Venables Vernon	Whig
Lichfield (seat 2/2)	Sir George Anson	Whig
Limerick	John Prendergast Vereker	Tory
County Limerick (seat 1/2)	Hon. William Henry Quin	
County Limerick (seat 2/2)	Richard FitzGibbon	
Lincoln (seat 1/2)	Ralph Bernal	
Lincoln (seat 2/2)	Coningsby Waldo Sibthorp	
Lincolnshire (seat 1/2)	Charles Anderson-Pelham	
Lincolnshire (seat 2/2)	Charles Chaplin	
Linlithgow Burghs (seat 1/1)	Sir John Buchanan Riddell – died Replaced by John Pringle 1819	
Linlithgowshire (seat 1/1)	Sir Alexander Hope	
Lisburn	John Leslie Foster – sat for Armagh City; Replaced by Horace Seymour 1819	Tory
Liskeard (seat 1/2)	William Eliot	Tory
Liskeard (seat 2/2)	Sir William Pringle	Tory
Liverpool (seat 1/2)	Isaac Gascoyne	Tory
Liverpool (seat 2/2)	George Canning	Tory
London (City of) (seat 1/4)	Thomas Wilson	Tory
London (City of) (seat 2/4)	Robert Waithman	Whig
London (City of) (seat 3/4)	John Thomas Thorp	Whig
London (City of) (seat 4/4)	Matthew Wood	Whig
Londonderry	Sir George Hill, Bt	Tory
County Londonderry (seat 1/2)	Alexander Robert Stewart	Tory
County Londonderry (seat 2/2)	George Robert Dawson	Tory
County Longford (seat 1/2)	Sir Thomas Fetherston – died Replaced by Sir George Ralph Fetherston 1819	Tory
County Longford (seat 2/2)	Viscount Forbes	Tory
Lostwithiel (seat 1/2)	Sir Robert Wigram	Tory
Lostwithiel (seat 2/2)	Sir Alexander Cray Grant	Tory
County Louth (seat 1/2)	John Foster	Tory
County Louth (seat 2/2)	Viscount Jocelyn	Tory
Ludgershall (seat 1/2)	The Earl of Carhampton	Tory
Ludgershall (seat 2/2)	(Sir) Sandford Graham	Whig
Ludlow (seat 1/2)	Viscount Clive	Tory
Ludlow (seat 2/2)	Robert Clive	
Lyme Regis (seat 1/2)	Vere Fane	Tory
Lyme Regis (seat 2/2)	John Thomas Fane	Tory
Lymington (seat 1/2)	Sir Harry Burrard-Neale, Bt	
Lymington (seat 2/2)	Vere Fane	
== M ==
Maidstone (seat 1/2)	Abraham Wildey Robarts	Whig
Maidstone (seat 2/2)	George Longman	
Maldon (seat 1/2)	Joseph Holden Strutt	Tory
Maldon (seat 2/2)	Benjamin Gaskell	Whig
Mallow	William Wrixon Becher	Whig
Malmesbury (seat 1/2)	(Sir) Charles Forbes	Tory
Malmesbury (seat 2/2)	Kirkman Finlay	Tory
Malton (seat 1/2)	John Ramsden	Whig
Malton (seat 2/2)	Viscount Duncannon	Whig
Marlborough (seat 1/2)	John Wodehouse	–
Marlborough (seat 2/2)	Lord Brudenell	Tory
County Mayo (seat 1/2)	James Browne	Tory
County Mayo (seat 2/2)	Dominick Browne	Whig
County Meath (seat 1/2)	Thomas Taylour, Earl of Bective	
County Meath (seat 2/2)	Sir Marcus Somerville, Bt	Whig
Merionethshire (seat 1/1)	Sir Robert Williames Vaughan	Tory
Middlesex (seat 1/2)	George Byng	Whig
Middlesex (seat 2/2)	William Mellish	Tory
Midhurst (seat 1/2)	Samuel Smith	
Midhurst (seat 2/2)	John Smith	Tory
Milborne Port (seat 1/2)	Edward Paget	Tory
Milborne Port (seat 2/2)	Robert Matthew Casberd	Tory
Minehead (seat 1/2)	John Fownes Luttrell, junior	Tory
Minehead (seat 2/2)	Henry Fownes Luttrell	Tory
Mitchell (seat 1/2)	Sir George Staunton, Bt	
Mitchell (seat 2/2)	William Leake	
County Monaghan (seat 1/2)	Henry Westenra	
County Monaghan (seat 2/2)	Charles Powell Leslie II	
Monmouth Boroughs (seat 1/1)	Marquess of Worcester	
Monmouthshire (seat 1/2)	Lt Col. Sir Charles Morgan	
Monmouthshire (seat 2/2)	Lord Granville Somerset	
Montgomery (seat 1/1)	Henry Clive	
Montgomeryshire (seat 1/1)	Charles Williams-Wynn	Tory
Morpeth (seat 1/2)	William Ord	Whig
Morpeth (seat 2/2)	Hon. William Howard	
== N ==
Nairnshire (seat 0/0)	Alternated with Cromartyshire. No representation in 1818	
New Romney (seat 1/2)	Andrew Strahan	Tory
New Romney (seat 2/2)	Richard Erle Drax Grosvenor – died Replaced by Richard Edward Erle Drax Grosvenor 1819	- Whig
New Ross	John Carroll	
New Shoreham (seat 1/2)	Sir Charles Merrik Burrell, Bt	Tory
New Shoreham (seat 2/2)	James Lloyd	
Newark (seat 1/2)	Henry Willoughby	Tory
Newark (seat 2/2)	Sir William Henry Clinton	Tory
Newcastle-under-Lyme (seat 1/2)	William Shepherd Kinnersley	Tory
Newcastle-under-Lyme (seat 2/2)	Robert John Wilmot	Tory
Newcastle-upon-Tyne (seat 1/2)	Sir Matthew White Ridley, Bt	Whig
Newcastle-upon-Tyne (seat 2/2)	Cuthbert Ellison	Whig
Newport (Cornwall) (seat 1/2)	William Northey	Tory
Newport (Cornwall) (seat 2/2)	Jonathan Raine	Tory
Newport (Isle of Wight) (seat 1/2)	Charles Duncombe	
Newport (Isle of Wight) (seat 2/2)	Leonard Worsley-Holmes	
Newry	Francis Needham became an Irish peer Replaced by Francis Jack Needham 1819	Tory; Tory
Newton (Lancashire) (seat 1/2)	Thomas Legh	
Newton (Lancashire) (seat 2/2)	Thomas Claughton	
Newtown (Isle of Wight) (seat 1/2)	Hudson Gurney	Whig
Newtown (Isle of Wight) (seat 2/2)	George Anderson-Pelham	Whig
Norfolk (seat 1/2)	Thomas Coke	Whig
Norfolk (seat 2/2)	Edmund Wodehouse 1817	Tory
Northallerton (seat 1/2)	Viscount Lascelles	Tory
Northallerton (seat 2/2)	Henry Peirse (younger)	Whig
Northampton (seat 1/2)	Lord Compton	
Northampton (seat 2/2)	Sir Edward Kerrison, Bt.	
Northamptonshire (seat 1/2)	Viscount Althorp	Whig
Northamptonshire (seat 2/2)	William Ralph Cartwright	Tory
Northumberland (seat 1/2)	Sir Charles Monck	
Northumberland (seat 2/2)	Thomas Wentworth Beaumont	
Norwich (seat 1/2)	William Smith	Radical
Norwich (seat 2/2)	Richard Hanbury Gurney	
Nottingham (seat 1/2)	The Lord Rancliffe	
Nottingham (seat 2/2)	Joseph Birch	Tory
Nottinghamshire (seat 1/2)	Frank Frank	
Nottinghamshire (seat 2/2)	Lord William Bentinck	
== O ==
Okehampton (seat 1/2)	Christopher Savile – died Replaced by The Lord Dunalley 1819	Tory; Whig
Okehampton (seat 2/2)	Albany Savile	Tory
Old Sarum (seat 1/2)	James Alexander	Tory
Old Sarum (seat 2/2)	Arthur Johnston Crawford	Tory
Orford (seat 1/2)	John Douglas	Tory
Orford (seat 2/2)	Edmond Alexander MacNaghten	Tory
Orkney and Shetland (seat 1/1)	George Heneage Lawrence Dundas	
Oxford (seat 1/2)	John Atkyns-Wright	
Oxford (seat 2/2)	Frederick St John	
Oxfordshire (seat 1/2)	William Henry Ashhurst	Whig; Tory
Oxfordshire (seat 2/2)	John Fane	Tory
Oxford University (seat 1/2)	Sir William Scott	Tory
Oxford University (seat 2/2)	Robert Peel	Tory
== P ==
Peeblesshire (seat 1/1)	James Montgomery	
Pembroke Boroughs (seat 1/1)	John Hensleigh Allen	Whig
Pembrokeshire (seat 1/1)	John Owen	
Penryn (seat 1/2)	Henry Swann – election voided on petition Seat vacant 1818	Tory
Penryn (seat 2/2)	Sir Christopher Hawkins	Tory
Perth Burghs (seat 1/1)	Archibald Campbell	
Perthshire (seat 1/1)	James Drummond	Tory
Peterborough (seat 1/2)	William Lamb – resigned Replaced by Sir Robert Heron 1819	Whig
Peterborough (seat 2/2)	William Elliot – died Replaced by James Scarlett 1819	Whig
Petersfield (seat 1/2)	Hylton Jolliffe	
Petersfield (seat 2/2)	George Canning II	
Plymouth (seat 1/2)	Sir William Congreve	
Plymouth (seat 2/2)	Sir Thomas Byam Martin	
Plympton Erle (seat 1/2)	Ranald George Macdonald	
Plympton Erle (seat 2/2)	Alexander Boswell	
Pontefract (seat 1/2)	Thomas Houldsworth	
Pontefract (seat 2/2)	Viscount Pollington	
Poole (seat 1/2)	John Dent	
Poole (seat 2/2)	Benjamin Lester Lester	Whig
Portarlington	Richard Sharp – resigned Replaced by David Ricardo 1819	
Portsmouth (seat 1/2)	Sir George Cockburn, Bt	Tory
Portsmouth (seat 2/2)	John Carter	Whig; Whig
Preston (seat 1/2)	Edmund Hornby	Whig
Preston (seat 2/2)	Samuel Horrocks	Tory
== Q ==
Queenborough (seat 1/2)	Robert Moorsom	Tory
Queenborough (seat 2/2)	Hon. Edmund Phipps	Tory
Queen's County (seat 1/2)	Hon. William Wellesley-Pole	Tory
Queen's County (seat 2/2)	Henry Brooke Parnell	Whig
== R ==
Radnor Boroughs (seat 1/1)	Richard Price	Tory
Radnorshire (seat 1/1)	Walter Wilkins	Whig
Reading (seat 1/2)	Charles Shaw-Lefevre	
Reading (seat 2/2)	Charles Fyshe Palmer	
Reigate (seat 1/2)	Joseph Sydney Yorke	Tory
Reigate (seat 2/2)	John Somers-Cocks	Tory
Renfrewshire (seat 1/1)	John Maxwell	
Richmond (Yorkshire) (seat 1/2)	Thomas Dundas	Whig
Richmond (Yorkshire) (seat 2/2)	Viscount Maitland	Whig
Ripon (seat 1/2)	Frederick John Robinson	Tory
Ripon (seat 2/2)	George Gipps	Tory
Rochester (seat 1/2)	Lord Binning	Tory
Rochester (seat 2/2)	James Barnett	
County Roscommon (seat 1/2)	Arthur French	Whig
County Roscommon (seat 2/2)	Hon. Stephen Mahon	Whig
Ross-shire (seat 1/1)	Thomas Mackenzie	
Roxburghshire (seat 1/1)	Alexander Don	
Rutland (seat 1/2)	Sir Gerard Noel Noel	Tory
Rutland (seat 2/2)	Sir Gilbert Heathcote, Bt	Whig
Rye (seat 1/2)	John Maberly Charles Arbuthnot – sat for St. Germans; Replaced by Thomas Phillipps Lamb 1819 – died Replaced by John Dodson 1819	Tory –
Rye (seat 2/2)	Peter Browne	
== S ==
St Albans (seat 1/2)	William Tierney Robarts	Whig
St Albans (seat 2/2)	Lord Charles Spencer-Churchill	Tory
St Germans (seat 1/2)	Hon. Seymour Thomas Bathurst	Tory
St Germans (seat 2/2)	Charles Arbuthnot	Tory
St Ives (seat 1/2)	Samuel Stephens	Tory
St Ives (seat 2/2)	Sir Walter Stirling, 1st Baronet	
St Mawes (seat 1/2)	Scrope Bernard	Tory
St Mawes (seat 2/2)	Joseph Phillimore	Tory
Salisbury (seat 1/2)	Viscount Folkestone	
Salisbury (seat 2/2)	Wadham Wyndham	
Saltash (seat 1/2)	Matthew Russell	Whig
Saltash (seat 2/2)	James Blair	
Sandwich (seat 1/2)	Joseph Marryat	
Sandwich (seat 2/2)	Sir George Warrender	
Scarborough (seat 1/2)	Charles Manners Sutton	Tory
Scarborough (seat 2/2)	Viscount Normanby	Whig
Seaford (seat 1/2)	Charles Rose Ellis	Tory
Seaford (seat 2/2)	George Watson-Taylor	Tory
Selkirkshire (seat 1/1)	William Eliott-Lockhart	
Shaftesbury (seat 1/2)	John Bacon Sawrey Morritt	
Shaftesbury (seat 2/2)	Henry John Shepherd	
Shrewsbury (seat 1/2)	Henry Grey Bennet	Whig
Shrewsbury (seat 2/2)	Richard Lyster – died Replaced by John Mytton 1819	Tory; Tory
Shropshire (seat 1/2)	John Kynaston	
Shropshire (seat 2/2)	John Cotes	
Sligo	John Bent	Tory
County Sligo (seat 1/2)	Edward Synge Cooper	Tory
County Sligo (seat 2/2)	Charles O'Hara	Tory
Somerset (seat 1/2)	William Gore-Langton	Whig
Somerset (seat 2/2)	William Dickinson	Tory
Southampton (seat 1/2)	William Chamberlayne	
Southampton (seat 2/2)	Sir William Champion de Crespigny, Bt	
Southwark (seat 1/2)	Sir Robert Wilson	Whig
Southwark (seat 2/2)	Charles Calvert	Whig
Stafford (seat 1/2)	Benjamin Benyon	Whig
Stafford (seat 2/2)	Samuel Homfray	
Staffordshire (seat 1/2)	Edward Littleton	Tory
Staffordshire (seat 2/2)	Earl Gower	Whig
Stamford (seat 1/2)	Lord Thomas Cecil	Tory
Stamford (seat 2/2)	Captain the Hon. William Percy	Tory
Steyning (seat 1/2)	George Philips	Whig
Steyning (seat 2/2)	Sir John Aubrey	Whig
Stirling Burghs (seat 1/1)	John Campbell – void election Replaced by Francis Ward Primrose 1819	
Stirlingshire (seat 1/1)	Sir Charles Edmonstone	
Stockbridge (seat 1/2)	Joseph Foster Barham	Whig
Stockbridge (seat 2/2)	George Porter	Whig
Sudbury (seat 1/2)	William Heygate	
Sudbury (seat 2/2)	John Broadhurst	
Suffolk (seat 1/2)	Sir William Rowley, Bt	
Suffolk (seat 2/2)	Thomas Gooch	
Surrey (seat 1/2)	William Joseph Denison	Whig
Surrey (seat 2/2)	George Holme Sumner	Tory
Sussex (seat 1/2)	Sir Godfrey Webster, Bt	Tory
Sussex (seat 2/2)	Walter Burrell	
Sutherland (seat 1/1)	George Macpherson Grant	Tory
== T ==
Tain Burghs (seat 1/1)	Sir Hugh Innes, Bt	
Tamworth (seat 1/2)	William Yates Peel	
Tamworth (seat 2/2)	Sir Robert Peel	Tory
Taunton (seat 1/2)	Alexander Baring	
Taunton (seat 2/2)	Sir William Burroughs, Bt	
Tavistock (seat 1/2)	Lord William Russell – resigned Replaced by John Peter Grant 1819	Whig; Whig
Tavistock (seat 2/2)	Lord John Russell	Whig
Tewkesbury (seat 1/2)	John Edmund Dowdeswell	Tory
Tewkesbury (seat 2/2)	John Martin	Whig
Thetford (seat 1/2)	Lord Charles FitzRoy	
Thetford (seat 2/2)	Nicholas Ridley-Colborne	
Thirsk (seat 1/2)	Robert Frankland	Whig
Thirsk (seat 2/2)	Robert Greenhill-Russell	Whig
County Tipperary (seat 1/2)	Hon. Montagu James Mathew – died Replaced by Francis Aldborough Prittie 1819	Whig; Whig
County Tipperary (seat 2/2)	Viscount Caher– became an Irish Peer; Replaced by William Bagwell 1819	- Tory
Tiverton (seat 1/2)	William Fitzhugh – resigned Replaced by Viscount Sandon 1819	Tory; Tory
Tiverton (seat 2/2)	Hon. Richard Ryder	Tory
Totnes (seat 1/2)	William Holmes	Tory
Totnes (seat 2/2)	Thomas Peregrine Courtenay	
Tralee	Edward Denny – resigned Replaced by James Cuffe 1819	Tory; Tory
Tregony (seat 1/2)	Viscount Barnard	Whig
Tregony (seat 2/2)	James O'Callaghan	Whig
Truro (seat 1/2)	Lord FitzRoy Somerset	Tory
Truro (seat 2/2)	William Edward Tomline	Tory
County Tyrone (seat 1/2)	John Stewart	Tory
County Tyrone (seat 2/2)	William Stewart	Whig
== W ==
Wallingford (seat 1/2)	William Hughes	Whig
Wallingford (seat 2/2)	Ebenezer Fuller Maitland	Tory
Wareham (seat 1/2)	John Calcraft	Whig
Wareham (seat 2/2)	Thomas Denman	Whig
Warwick (seat 1/2)	Charles Mills	
Warwick (seat 2/2)	Sir Charles John Greville	Tory
Warwickshire (seat 1/2)	Dugdale Stratford Dugdale	
Warwickshire (seat 2/2)	Charles Mordaunt	
Waterford	Sir John Newport, Bt	Whig
County Waterford (seat 1/2)	Lord George Thomas Beresford	Tory
County Waterford (seat 2/2)	Richard Power II	Whig
Wells (seat 1/2)	Charles William Taylor	Whig
Wells (seat 2/2)	John Paine Tudway	Tory
Wendover (seat 1/2)	Robert Carrington	Whig
Wendover (seat 2/2)	George Smith	Whig
Wenlock (seat 1/2)	John Simpson	
Wenlock (seat 2/2)	Cecil Forester	
Weobley (seat 1/2)	Viscount Weymouth	
Weobley (seat 2/2)	Lord Frederick Cavendish Bentinck	
West Looe (seat 1/2)	Charles Hulse	Tory
West Looe (seat 2/2)	Henry Goulburn	Tory
Westbury (seat 1/2)	Ralph Franco – resigned Replaced by William Leader Maberly 1819	Tory; Whig
Westbury (seat 2/2)	Lord Francis Conyngham	
County Westmeath (seat 1/2)	Hon. Hercules Robert Pakenham	Tory
County Westmeath	Gustavus Hume-Rochfort	Tory
Westminster (seat 1/2)	Francis Burdett	Whig
Westminster (seat 2/2)	Sir Samuel Romilly – died Replaced by George Lamb 1819	Whig; Tory
Westmorland (seat 1/2)	Henry Cecil Lowther	Tory
Westmorland (seat 2/2)	Viscount Lowther	Tory
Wexford	Richard Nevill – resigned Replaced by Henry Evans 1819	Tory; Tory
County Wexford (seat 1/2)	Robert Carew	Whig
County Wexford (seat 2/2)	Caesar Colclough	
Weymouth and Melcombe Regis (seat 1/4)	William Williams	Whig
Weymouth and Melcombe Regis (seat 2/4)	Thomas Fowell Buxton	Whig
Weymouth and Melcombe Regis (seat 3/4)	Thomas Wallace	Tory
Weymouth and Melcombe Regis (seat 4/4)	Masterton Ure	Tory
Whitchurch (seat 1/2)	Sir Samuel Scott	Tory
Whitchurch (seat 2/2)	Horatio George Powys Townshend 1816	Tory
County Wicklow (seat 1/2)	Granville Leveson Proby	Whig
County Wicklow (seat 2/2)	William Parnell Hayes	
Wigan (seat 1/2)	John Hodson	Tory
Wigan (seat 2/2)	Sir Robert Holt Leigh	Tory
Wigtown Burghs (seat 1/1)	James Henry Keith Stewart	Tory
Wigtownshire (seat 1/1)	James Hunter Blair	
Wilton (seat 1/2)	Ralph Sheldon	
Wilton (seat 2/2)	Viscount FitzHarris	
Wiltshire (seat 1/2)	Paul Methuen – resigned Replaced by John Benett 1819	
Wiltshire (seat 2/2)	William Pole-Tylney-Long-Wellesley	Tory
Winchelsea (seat 1/2)	Henry Peter Brougham	Whig
Winchelsea (seat 2/2)	George Galway Mills	Whig
Winchester (seat 1/2)	James Henry Leigh	
Winchester (seat 2/2)	Paulet St John-Mildmay	
Windsor (seat 1/2)	Edward Disbrowe – died Replaced by The Lord Graves 1819	Tory; Tory
Windsor (seat 2/2)	John Ramsbottom	Whig
Woodstock (seat 1/2)	Sir Henry Dashwood, Bt	Tory
Woodstock (seat 2/2)	Lord Robert Spencer	
Wootton Bassett (seat 1/2)	Richard Ellison	Whig
Wootton Bassett (seat 2/2)	William Taylor Money	
Worcester (seat 1/2)	Thomas Henry Hastings Davies	Whig
Worcester (seat 2/2)	Viscount Deerhurst	Tory
Worcestershire (seat 1/2)	William Lyttelton	
Worcestershire (seat 2/2)	Henry Beauchamp Lygon	
Wycombe (seat 1/2)	Sir Thomas Baring, Bt	
Wycombe (seat 2/2)	Sir John Dashwood-King, Bt	Tory
== Y ==
Yarmouth (Isle of Wight) (seat 1/2)	John Taylor – resigned Replaced by Sir Peter Pole 1819	Tory; Tory
Yarmouth (Isle of Wight) (seat 2/2)	William Mount – resigned Replaced by John Wilson Croker 1819	Tory; Tory
York (seat 1/2)	Lawrence Dundas	Whig
York (seat 2/2)	Sir Mark Masterman-Sykes	Whig
Yorkshire (seat 1/2)	Viscount Milton	Whig
Yorkshire (seat 2/2)	James Stuart-Wortley	Tory
Youghal (seat 1/1)	James Bernard, Viscount Bernard	Tory

== By-elections ==
- List of United Kingdom by-elections (1818–32)

== See also ==
- List of parliaments of the United Kingdom
- Unreformed House of Commons
