= Charles Trelawny Brereton =

British Army officer and landowner

Charles Trelawny, later Trelawny-Brereton (c. 1757 – 10 September 1820), was a British Army officer and landowner.

Trelawny was the eldest son of Lt-Gen. Harry Trelawny and his wife, Mary Dormer. He was educated at Westminster School from 1768 to 1773 and then obtained an ensign's commission in the Coldstream Guards, in which his father was captain. He became lieutenant and captain in 1777 and captain and lieutenant-colonel in 1785.

On 3 July 1786, he married Mary (d. 1852), the daughter of Thomas Hawkins. According to his younger son, the match was made for her fortune, but this was smaller than he supposed and he did not get along well with her. Becoming financially straitened, he sold his commission in the Guards in 1790 and retired to the country.

He took the additional name of Brereton in 1800, having inherited Shotwick Park in Saughall from his first cousin Owen Salusbury Brereton. Although this bequest made him a rich man, his miserly behavior only worsened (perhaps stimulated by the example of his brother-in-law, Sir Christopher Hawkins), and there was considerable friction in his family life. He had six children with Mary:

- Catherine Sophia Trelawny (1791–1882), married Charles Frederic Louis Dupleix, Comte de Cadignan in 1822
- Capt. Harry Brereton Trelawny (1792–1869), Grenadier Guards
- Edward John Trelawny (1792–1881), adventurer
- Mira Hawkins Trelawny (1796–1883), married Louis Berthold Edgard, Vicomte d'Estampes in 1825
- Charlotte Trelawny (b. 1797), married John Charles Trevanion
- Caroline Trelawny (d. 1814/5)

On 1 February 1808, his election to the Cornish borough of Mitchell was arranged by his brother-in-law, Hawkins, to replace the vacancy left by George Galway Mills (to whom Hawkins had given the seat to escape debtors' prison). This was merely a temporary appointment while Hawkins negotiated terms with John Bruce to take the seat, and Trelawny-Brereton took the Chiltern Hundreds in February 1809 to make way for Bruce. The election did result in the cancellation of Trelawny-Brereton's appointment as High Sheriff of Cheshire in 1808. In October 1812, Hawkins set him to contest Grampound, but he stood third at the poll, behind a coalition of Andrew Cochrane-Johnstone and John Teed. His petitions against the result failed in 1813.

John Bruce retired in 1814 to head the Stationery Office in Edinburgh, and Trelawny-Brereton was again put in temporarily at Mitchell on 2 August. He took the Manor of East Hendred on 5 December 1814 to make way for Lord Binning, a government candidate. Hawkins put him up as one of two candidates at Helston at the 1818 election, but they were defeated by the interest of the Duke of Leeds. A similar result occurred in the March 1820 election. Trelawny-Brereton died suddenly that September.

Parliament of the United Kingdom
Preceded by George Galway Mills; Sir James Hall	Member of Parliament for Mitchell; 1808–1809; With: Sir James Hall	Succeeded by Sir James Hall; John Bruce
Preceded by John Bruce; Hon. Edward Law	Member of Parliament for Mitchell; 1814; With: Hon. Edward Law	Succeeded by Hon. Edward Law; Lord Binning
