= John Innes (MP) =

John Innes (1767–1838) was a Scottish merchant and politician, Member of Parliament for Grampound from 1818, to the constituency's disenfranchisement for corruption.

== Life ==
He was the son of William Innes of Auldearn in Nairn and his wife Anna Smith. He became a partner in the India trade with David Scott in the mercantile agency Scott, Bonham, Hartwell, Innes and Co. at the London address Broad Street Buildings. It traded later under William Fairlie, taken over by Fairlie, Bonham and Co.

Innes entered Parliament in 1818 with Alexander Robertson for the two-member Grampound venal borough, by dealing with dissident Cornish locals who opposed the boroughmonger Sir Christopher Hawkins, 1st Baronet, in a contested election. John Cam Hobhouse and Michael Bruce were also potential candidates, but dropped out. The sitting Tories Ebenezer John Collett and John Teed were defeated. The resulting bribery investigation ultimately saw the end of the Grampound seat. In Parliament, Innes generally supported the Liverpool administration.
