= Smythwick =

Smythwick may refer to:

- William Smythwick, MP for Grampound
- Smythwick, subdivision of Canton, Georgia
