= Andrew Quick =

Andrew Quick may refer to:

- Andrew Quick (The Dark Tower), American fictional character
- Andrew Quick (MP), British Member of Parliament
