= Cornelius Burges =

English minister (1589?–1665)

- Born: 1589; Somerset, England
- Died: 1665 (aged 75–76); England
- Education: Oxford
- Church: Church of England
- Ordained: prior to 1613

Cornelius Burges or Burgess, DD (1589? – 1665), was an English minister. He was active in religious controversy prior to and around the time of the Commonwealth of England and The Protectorate, following the English Civil War. In the years from 1640 he was a particularly influential preacher.

== Early life ==
Burges was descended from the Burges or Bruges family of Batcombe, Somerset, was probably born in 1589. He was a son of Robert Burges (d. 1626) of Stanton Drew, Somerset and Alice Benbrick. Burges had brothers James and John, who remained at Stanton Drew, and a sister Hester who married Samuel Sherman of Dedham, Essex. In 1611 he was entered at Oxford, but at what college is unknown. He was transferred to Wadham College, Oxford, and graduated B.A. on 5 July 1615, and thence migrated to Lincoln College, Oxford, of which he was a member when he graduated M.A. on 20 April 1618. He must have taken orders before graduation, if it be true that on 21 December 1613 he obtained the vicarage of Watford, Hertfordshire, on the presentation of Sir Charles Morison. On 16 January 1626 he was allowed to hold, along with Watford, the rectory of St. Magnus, London Bridge. This latter he resigned in 1641, his successor being admitted on 20 July. Soon after the accession of Charles I he was made one of the king's chaplains in ordinary, and on 16 June 1627 he was made B.D. and D.D. by his university.

Wood represents him as being at this time a zealous son of the church, and as only taking to schismatical courses through the disappointment of his eagerness for preferment.

== Opposition to Laud ==
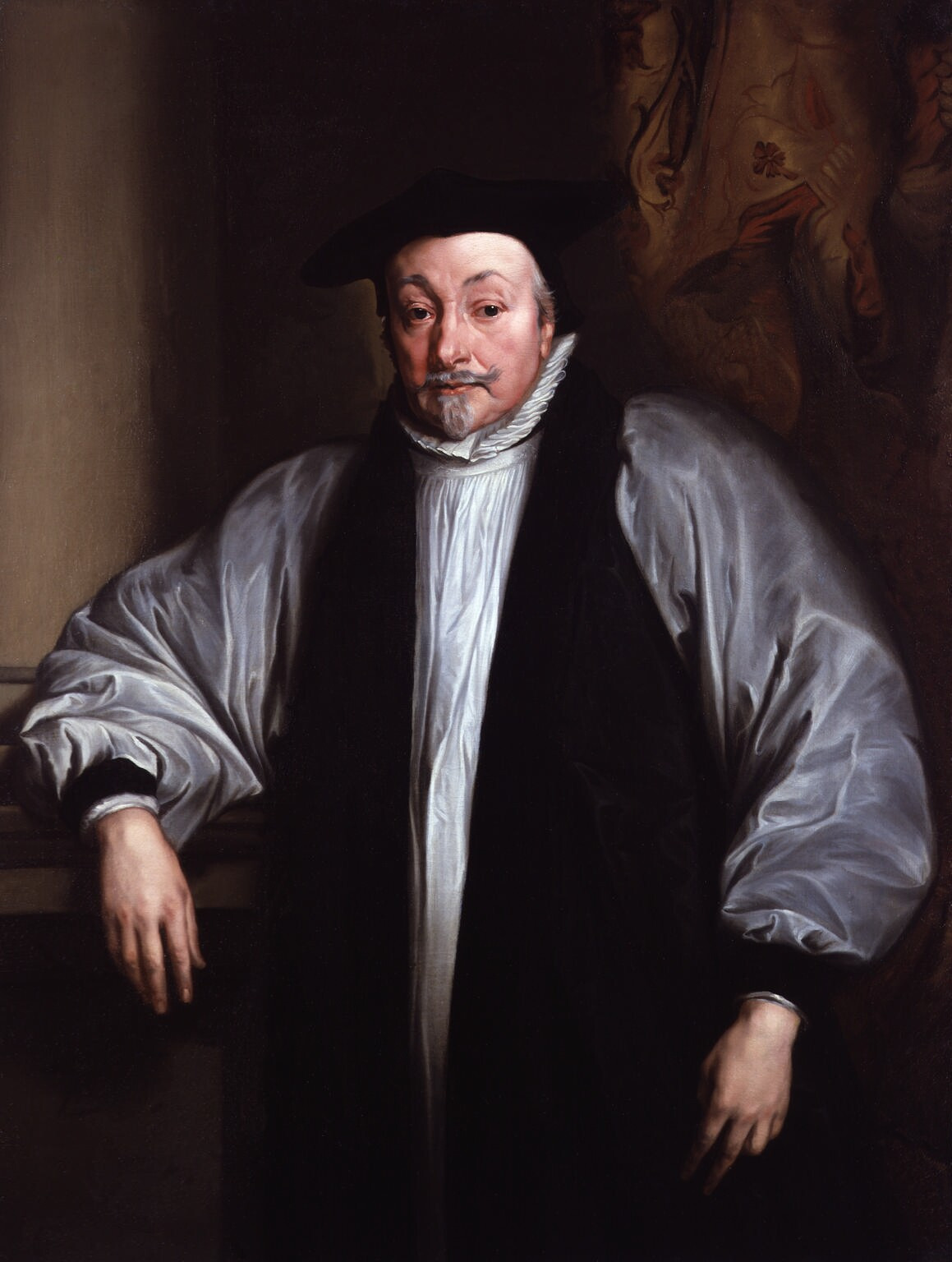
Archbishop of Canterbury William Laud was an enemy of Burges.

The Calvinistic views held by Burges are shown in his Baptismal Regeneration of Elect Infants, published at Oxford in 1629. A Latin sermon, preached in 1635 to the London clergy at St. Alphage's, London Wall, brought him before the Court of High Commission. In this discourse he had blamed the connivance of bishops at the growth of Arminianism and popery. The proceeding caused him trouble and expense, and deepened his hostility to the party of William Laud.

He was accused of being 'a vexer of two parishes with continual suits of law'. This may mean that he resisted the demands of visitation articles in reference to ceremonial observance. An Oxford pamphlet of 1648 is Wood's authority for saying that he was 'looked upon by the high commission as one guilty of adultery'. It is plain that there was no evidence to substantiate the charge.

The prestige of Burges steadily increased. Robert Rich, 2nd Earl of Warwick was his patron.

== 1640–1645 ==
In September 1640 he conveyed to the king at York the petition of the London clergy against the 'etcetera oath', and succeeded in getting it dispensed with. Clarendon in his History of the Rebellion and Civil Wars in England goes so far as to say that the influence of Burges and Stephen Marshall was greater with both houses of parliament than that of Laud had ever been with the court, a statement which, as Edmund Calamy the Elder observes, 'carries a pretty strong figure in it'.

The DNB comments that to link Burges and Marshall together, as though their views and policy were identical, is an error. Marshall was also a client of the Earl of Warwick. Christopher Hill, however, states that their fast sermons, delivered in succession on 17 November 1640, were clearly in concert. Hugh Trevor-Roper comments that none of that day's arrangements were casual. Wood also puts Burges and Marshall at the head of those who preached in 1640, 'that for the cause of religion it was lawful for the subjects to take up arms against their lawful sovereign'.

Burges came to the front rank of leaders on the ecclesiastical question in 1641, in connection with the effort made by the House of Lords for an accommodation of ecclesiastical differences. On 12 March the lords' 'committee for innovations' called in the assistance of a body of divines to take part in a sub-committee for examining alleged innovations in doctrine and discipline unlawfully introduced since the Reformation. Of seventeen divines who answered the summons six, headed by William Twisse, and including Burges, Marshall, and Calamy, constituted the section most opposed to the existing ecclesiastical system or its abuses. The four bishops and their friends on the sub-committee agreed to the proposed reformations; while, on the other hand, Twisse and his friends made no proposals antagonistic to episcopacy. The court party was stubborn against all concession; a growing party on the other side was for a more drastic treatment of episcopacy. The lords' attempt to find a modus vivendi was abandoned.

In the commons a measure was introduced, still not attacking episcopacy as such, but for the suppression of deaneries and chapters. John Hacket, afterwards bishop of Coventry and Lichfield (a member of the sub-committee), was put forward on 12 May to defend the menaced corporations at the bar of the house. The house called for Burges to speak in reply to him, which he did on the same afternoon at an hour's notice. Hugh Trevor-Roper points out that this was the day of Strafford's execution. His speech is said to have contained invective; he shared the puritan objection to instrumental music in church services, and made a point of the dissoluteness of cathedral singing-men. At the close of his reply he gave it as his opinion that, while necessary to apply the cathedral foundations to better purposes, 'it was by no means lawful to alienate them from public and pious uses, or to convert them to any private person's profit'. This acknowledgement was afterwards turned against him, for he himself became a purchaser of alienated chapter lands. Burges declared that he had spoken in haste; his mature judgement was in favour of the right of the state to apply to its own purposes the lands which had been assigned for the support of offices since abolished. He had advanced £3,500 to the parliament, and took the lands in payment. The date of his resignation of one of his livings should be noticed: he ceased to be a pluralist within two months of his speech against useless dignities. In the conflict with the king, Burges disclaimed altogether the attitude of rebellion, and his 'Vindication' proves his case.

He sided with the parliament in consequence of the assurances conveyed in the 'propositions and orders' of both houses on 10 June 1642, viz. that any subsidies received by the parliament should be employed only in maintaining 'the Protestant religion, the king's authority, his person in his royal dignity, the free course of justice, the laws of the land, the peace of the kingdom, and the privileges of parliament, against any force which shall oppose them'. For a short time he was (according to Wood) chaplain to Essex's regiment of horse. Subsequent proceedings, at a time when the parliament was overridden by the army, he openly declared to be subversive of the fundamental constitution of the kingdom. Burges's name stands thirty-second on the list of Westminster Assembly divines appointed by the ordinance of 12 June 1643. Twisse was named in the ordinance as prolocutor. On 8 July the assembly appointed Burges one of the two assessors or vice-presidents, and as Twisse was in feeble health, and John White, the other assessor, had fits of gout, on Burges, 'a very active and sharpe man' (as Baillie calls him), fell a good deal of the duty of keeping the assembly in order, at least until the appointment of Charles Herle to succeed Twisse, who died 19 July 1646. Burges was also convener of one of the three committees into which the assembly divided itself at the beginning of its work. His liturgical knowledge (he had a fine collection of the various issues of the common prayer-book) may be traced, Alexander Ferrier Mitchell thinks, in the composition of the 'Directory'.

Burges was one of the few who, in 1643, opposed the imposition of the Solemn League and Covenant, and he carried his opposition so far as to petition the House of Commons to be heard against it. He was not anxious to create an irreparable breach with the episcopal party. John Lightfoot on this occasion abused Burges as 'a wretch to be branded to all posterity, seeking for some devilish ends, either of his own or others, or both, to hinder so great a good of the two nations'. The commons on 2 September suspended Burges from the assembly as a 'turbulent doctor', and would not readmit him till on 15 September he had made his humble apology. However, the covenant was not signed until a clause had been inserted, limiting the sort of 'prelacy' against which it was aimed, so that the 'advocates of a reformed episcopacy could swallow it'. Having once taken the covenant, Burges revered its binding obligation, and could never be prevailed upon to renounce it. Four shillings a day was assigned by the ordinance to each assembly-man; but the allowance was paid in irregular driblets, and Burges was one of those who declined their share, that the poorer members might come somewhat better off.

On 12 March 1644 he was appointed (on the petition of the common councillors of London, December 1643) lecturer at St.Paul's, with a pension of £400 a year, and the dean's house as a residence. On 6 February 1645 he was ordered to give up Watford and Philip Goodwin succeeded him.

== Opposition to Cromwell ==
Later Burges was to shift positions. Around 1645–6, according to Trevor-Roper, the new kind of radical preacher exemplified by Hugh Peter becomes prominent, and Burges was in the group dropping away from the close supporters of Oliver Cromwell. He joined the Presbyterian wing of the opposition. The Vindication of the Ministers of the Gospel in and about London was drawn up by Burges in January 1649, and subscribed to by fifty-six other ministers who followed his lead.

When King Charles was brought to trial, Burges was the foremost, at great personal risk, in protesting against the proceeding with his usual freedom and vigour. On 14 January 1649, the day preceding that on which the king was brought from Windsor to be arraigned before the high court of justice, Burges preached at Mercers' Chapel, denouncing the measure in the strongest terms. He and his friends had taken up the cause of the parliament, as he declared in the 'Vindication', published while the trial was in progress, 'not to bring his majesty to justice (as some now speak), but to put him in a better capacity to do justice'.

== Later life ==
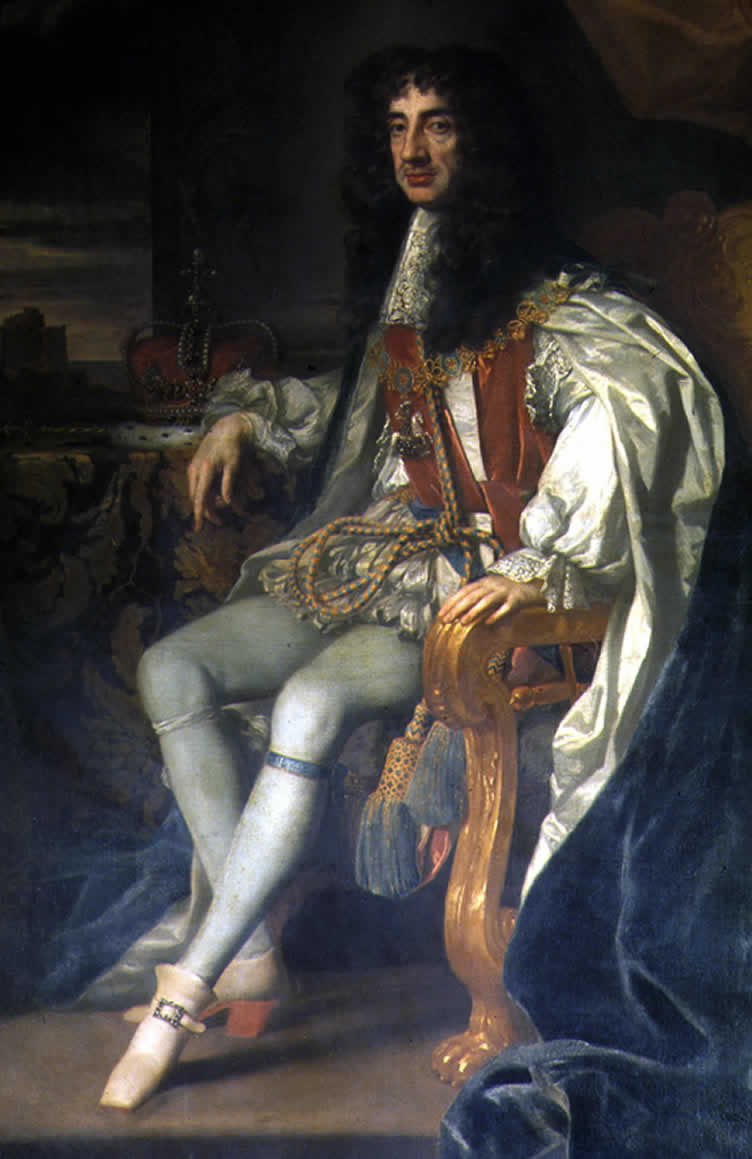
When King Charles II of England was restored to the throne, Burges was ruined.

About 1650 Burges obtained an appointment at Wells as preacher in the cathedral. In July 1656 there was a warm dispute about his exclusive right to officiate there. Burges objected to an arrangement by which the inhabitants of St. Cuthbert's parish were to hold their services in the cathedral. The ground of his objection does not appear; Stoughton conjectures that the other congregation was of the independent sort. His preaching was unwelcome. The citizens walked up and down the cloisters all sermon-time, and the constables had to be called in. About this time Burges invested his property in the purchase of alienated church lands, including the manor of Wells and the deanery which he rebuilt. He is said to have behaved with great rapacity, to have stripped the lead from the cathedral, to have used the proceeds to enlarge the deanery in which he lived, and to have let out the gate-houses as cottages. At the Restoration his investment (for which he had been offered over £12,000 in the previous year) was taken from him without recompense. Hence he was reduced to want, his pension was gone, he was suffering from cancer in the neck and cheek. He still had a house at Watford, and there he lived, attending the church in which he had formerly preached; he was compelled to part with his library for bread. He made application to Sir Richard Browne, Lord Mayor of London in 1660, who promised to provide for him if he would preach a recantation sermon in St. Paul's, and on his refusal flung him a gratuity of £3. Calamy describes him as ejected from St. Andrew's, Wells (which is the cathedral); this must have taken place before the Act of Uniformity. He was a worn-out man, yet, but for his maladies, he might have kept his old lead. It was his hand that drew up the 'Reasons' of the country ministers desiring reforms in the church at the Restoration, to which the authorities turned a deaf ear. He died at Watford, where he was buried in the church on 9 June 1665. He was married and left a son. By his will, dated Watford, 16 May 1665, he bequeathed his collection of prayer-books, the sole treasures saved from his library, to his 'dear and much-honoured mother, the renowned university of Oxford'.

== Assessments ==
The opposite writers speak of him with a bitterness which may be explained by his proceedings at Wells. Wood gloats over his miseries, Echard and Zachary Grey load his memory with reproaches. There was a spice of the demagogue in his temper; he had the popular ear, and liked leadership. Yet in ecclesiastical politics he was for moderate measures; in civil affairs he stood as the consistent advocate of constitutional freedom.

== Works ==
He published:

1. A Chain of Graces drawn out at length for Reformation of Manners, 1622
2. A New Discovery of Personal Tithes; or the 10th part of men's cleere gaines proved due, 1625
3. The Fire of the Sanctuarie newly uncovered, or a compleat tract of zeal, 1625
4. Baptismal Regeneration of Elect Infants professed by the Church of England, according to the Scriptures, the Primitive Church, the present Reformed Churches, and many particular Divines apart, 1629
5. The First Sermon preached before the House of Commons at their publique Fast, 17 November 1640, 1641
6. A Vindication of the Nine Reasons of the House of Commons against the Votes of Bishops in Parliament; or a Reply to the Answers made to the said Reasons in defence of such votes, 1641, 4to (this is anonymous, but is given to Burges both by Wood and Calamy)
7. A Sermon before the House of Commons, 5 Nov, 1641
8. The Necessity and Benefit of Washing the Heart, a sermon before the House of Commons, 30 March, 1642
9. The Vanity and Mischief of the Thoughts of an Heart Unwashed, a sermon before the House of Commons on their day of humiliation, 30 April, 1645
10. The Necessity of Agreement with God; a sermon preached before the House of Peers, 29 Oct, being the monethly Fast, 1645
11. Sion College, what it is and doth. A Vindication of that Society against Surges Two Pamphlets, 1648
12. A Vindication of the Ministers of the Gospel in and about London from the unjust aspersions cast upon their former actings for the Parliament as if they promoted the bringing of the king to capital punishment, 1648
13. Case as lecturer in Paul's
14. A Case concerning the Buying of Bishops' Lands, with the lawfulness thereof, and the difference between the contractors for the sale of those lands and the corporation of Wells
15. No Sacrilege nor Sinne to aliene or purchase the lands of Bishops or others, whose offices are abolished, 2nd edition, 1659
16. No Sacrilege ... Cathedral Lands as such, 3rd editions. 1660,
17. Prudent Silence, a sermon in Mercers-Chappel to the Lord Mayor and the City, 14 January 1648, shewing the great sin and mischief of destroying kings, 1660
18. Reasons showing the Necessity of Reformation of the Public Doctrine, Worship, Rites and Ceremonies, Church Government, and Discipline, &c., offered to Parliament by divers Ministers of sundry counties in England, 1660
19. Some of the Differences and Alterations in the present Common Prayer-Book from the book established by the Act in the 5th and 6th of Ed. VI and 1st of Q. Eliz., 1660
