= Charles Cooke (Grampound MP) =

Businessperson and Sheriff of London

Sir Charles Cooke (died 2 January 1721) of Hackney, Middlesex was an English merchant and politician who sat in the House of Commons from 1715 to 1721.

Cooke was the eldest son of Thomas Cooke of Hackney and the brother of James Cooke, MP for Tregony.

Cooke was returned as Member of Parliament for Grampound at the 1715 general election. He was Master of the Worshipful Company of Mercers in 1716. He was knighted in January 1717 and appointed Sheriff of London the same year. Following his death he left a bequest to Morden College.

Cooke died unmarried on 2 January 1721.

Parliament of Great Britain
Preceded by Andrew Quick; Thomas Coke	Member of Parliament for Grampound; 1715–1721; With: Hon. John West	Succeeded by Hon. John West; Richard West
