= Colonial agent =

Colonial representative in London

A colonial agent was the official representative of a British colony based in London during the British Empire. The role evolved during the seventeenth and eighteenth centuries. Initially established as a temporary role to deal with a specific problem, by the eighteenth century the role became more permanent. However, this did not always mean there was full continuity

== Earliest colonial agents ==
At first a colony would send occasional special agents on a temporary basis. Thus Rhode Island engaged John Clarke as their agent both to the Commonwealth government of Oliver Cromwell and the restoration regime of Charles II.

== Following the "Glorious Revolution" ==
At the time of the Glorious Revolution four colonies had started to have more permanent representation: Connecticut, Massachusetts, and Virginia.

About 200 men served. They were selected and paid a fixed salary by the colonial government, and given the long delays in communication, they played a major role in negotiating with royal officials, and explaining colonial needs and resources. Their main business was with the Board of Trade, where the agent dealt with land problems, border disputes, military affairs, and Indian affairs. They provided the British officials with the documents and news, secured acceptance of controversial colonial legislation, and tried to head off policies objectionable to the colonies. They handled the appeal cases, which usually went to the Privy Council. Permanent agents became the practice after 1700; most were Americans but some were British. Many of the agents worked together 1730-1733 to oppose a bill establishing a monopoly in West Indian rum, sugar and molasses.

== Notable colonial agents ==
The most famous agent was Benjamin Franklin, who was employed for 15 years by Pennsylvania, and also by Georgia, New Jersey, and Massachusetts. Others include Richard Jackson, a prominent London lawyer who represented Connecticut, and Charles Pinckney who represented South Carolina.

In 1768, the colony of Georgia hired Franklin, who was already Pennsylvania's colonial agent. Franklin favored Georgia's lower house, to the annoyance of the upper house and royal governor. He cut back his work for Georgia after 1771, because the colony was delinquent in paying his fees.

William Samuel Johnson, a Connecticut lawyer, was known in the 1760s as a colonial rights. As the colonial agent for Connecticut he sharply criticized British policy toward the colonies. His experience in London in 1767 convinced him that Britain's policy was shaped more by ignorance of American conditions and not through the sinister designs of a wicked government, He felt that the American Revolution was not necessary and that independence would be bad for everyone concerned.

Robert Sewell was a lawyer who after emigrating to Jamaica returned to England where he combined being a colonial agent for that colony (1795-1806) with being a member of parliament for Grampound (1796 to 1802).

- William Byrd II was colonial agent for Virginia 1698 - 1702 and had a long history as a tobacco plantation owner.
- Nathaniel Blakiston was colonial agent for Virginia and Maryland after 1706 having served as the 8th Royal Governor of Maryland from 1698 to 1702.

== Other countries ==
In southern Ethiopia, Amhara colonial agents in the 19th century were known as neftenya.
