= Philip Goodwin =

Philip Goodwin may refer to:

- Philip Goodwin (divine) (died 1699), English clergyman
- Philip A. Goodwin (1882–1937), American politician from New York
- Philip L. Goodwin (1885–1958), American architect
- Philip R. Goodwin (1881–1935), American painter and illustrator
