= Alexander Robertson (MP) =

English politician

Alexander Robertson (14 February 1779 – 17 December 1856) was an English politician.

He was elected at the 1818 as one of the two Members of Parliament (MPs) for the rotten borough of Grampound in Cornwall, and was re-elected in 1820.

The borough was disenfranchised in 1821 for gross corruption, but its two MPs retained their seats until the dissolution of Parliament in 1826.

Parliament of the United Kingdom
Preceded by John Teed; Ebenezer John Collett	Member of Parliament for Grampound; 1818 – 1826; With: John Innes	Constituency disenfranchised
