= Robert Sewell (lawyer) =

British politician

Robert Sewell (1751 – 30 April 1828) was a British politician and colonial official who sat in the Parliament of Great Britain and Parliament of United Kingdom from 1796 to 1802 and served as the Attorney General of Jamaica.

Sewell was the son of Sir Thomas Sewell and Catherine Heath of Ottershaw Park, Surrey and christened 13 December 1751 at All Hallows, London. He studied law at the Middle Temple and was called to the bar in 1770.

He married Sarah Lewis in St Pancras, London on 18 November 1775. In February 1776 they set sail for Jamaica on board the Judith and Hilaria from Portsmouth with Sarah's sisters Mary, Maria and Catherine. In 1780 he was appointed as the Attorney General of Jamaica. He returned to England in 1795 to become a colonial agent for Jamaica.

In 1781 he fathered an illegitimate son with a local black woman. This son was the future-revolutionary William Davidson.

He became member of parliament for Grampound from 1796 to 1802 and spoke in the House of Commons on behalf of the West Indian Planters interest. In May 1797, he argued that it would be economically impossible to abolish slavery. In April and May 1798 he spoke against the abolitionist William Smith's proposal to provide minimum level of space for enslaved Africans on slave ships. He rejected a minimum of 40 cubic feet (1.1 m^{3}), arguing that "negroes prefer being herded together".

He was an uncle of "Monk" Lewis. He also brought up William Henry, who adopted the name William Henry Sewell and became a general in the British Army.

Parliament of Great Britain
Preceded by Thomas Wallace; Jeremiah Crutchley	Member of Parliament for Grampound; 1796–1800; With: Bryan Edwards	Succeeded by Parliament of the United Kingdom
Parliament of the United Kingdom
Preceded by Parliament of Great Britain	Member of Parliament for Grampound; 1801–1802; With: Sir Christopher Hawkins, Bt	Succeeded by Benjamin Hobhouse; Sir Christopher Hawkins, Bt
