= John Bettesworth-Trevanion =

British politician

John Trevanion Purnell Bettesworth-Trevanion

Member of Parliament for Penryn
- In office February 1807 – May 1807
- Preceded by: Christopher Hawkins
- Succeeded by: Charles Lemon

Personal details
- Born: 1780 St Michael Caerhays, Cornwall, England
- Died: 8 March 1840 (aged 59–60) Brussels, Belgium
- Party: Whig
- Spouse(s): Charlotte Hosier (1801–1810); Susannah Burdett (1830–1840)
- Children: John, Henry, George, Frederick, Charlotte Agnes
- Education: Winchester College; Eton College

John Trevanion Purnell Bettesworth-Trevanion (born Bettesworth; 1780 – 8 March 1840) was a Cornish politician. He rebuilt Caerhays as a Gothic-style castle.

== Early life and education ==
Bettesworth was born in St Michael Caerhays, Cornwall, England in 1780. He was the first son of John Bettesworth (died 1789) of Caerhays, who in 1784 unsuccessfully contested a seat in Parliament for Tregony, and Frances Elinor Tomkins (died 1821). His siblings included George, Henry, Frances, and Georgiana. His paternal grandparents were John Bettesworth, LLD, Dean of Arches, and Frances Trevannion.

His education included Winchester College in 1788, and Eton College in 1796.

== Career ==
Bettesworth-Trevanion was appointed High Sheriff of Cornwall in 1804.

A Whig, he served as a Member of Parliament for Penryn briefly in 1807. He had contested the seat at the 1806 general election, but was defeated by Sir Christopher Hawkins; but the election was overturned on petition in February 1807, and Bettesworth-Trevanion held the seat until the general election in May 1807.

His military career included cornet 2nd Dragoon Guards and reaching the rank of lieutenant colonel in the Reserve Cornwall militia.

== Personal life ==
Bettesworth took the additional name of Trevanion by royal licence on 18 December 1801 when he inherited the Caerhays estate. Three days later, he married Charlotte Hosier (died 1810; age 27) by whom he had four sons including, John Charles Trevanion Bettesworth, Henry Trevanion Bettesworth (d. 1855), George Bettesworth (RN), and Frederick William Trevanion Bettesworth (vicar of Whitby), and one daughter, Charlotte Agnes (died 1809). His second son Henry Trevanion Bettesworth (1804–1855) married 4 February 1826 his distant cousin Georgiana Augusta Leigh (1808–1866), a daughter of Augusta Leigh (elder half-sister of Lord Byron) but in 1829 ran off with his sister-in-law Medora) to the Continent, where he eventually separated from her and died in 1855. In 1830, he married secondly Susannah (c. 1800 - 1886), daughter of the English reformist politician, Sir Francis Burdett, by whom he had a daughter.

Bettesworth-Trevanion rebuilt Caerhays as a Gothic-style castle using the design of the Anglo-Welsh architect John Nash. Construction began in 1807 and was completed in 1810. As a consequence of his extravagance, Bettesworth-Trevanion fell heavily into debt, fleeing to Paris, forced to live abroad.

Described as "the very arbiter elegantiarum", he died in Brussels, Belgium in 1840.

== In popular culture ==
He is a recurring character in the later Poldark novels by Winston Graham. The books stress both the magnificence of Caerhays and the ruinous cost to Trevanion of the rebuilding: a well-informed neighbour remarks that "the madman's nigh on bankrupt". Bella Poldark, the final novel in the Poldark sequence, details his flight abroad.

Parliament of the United Kingdom
Preceded by Sir Christopher Hawkins, Bt; Henry Swann	Member of Parliament for Penryn; Feb 1807 – May 1807; With: Henry Swann	Succeeded by Charles Lemon; Henry Swann
