= Egidius Wilson =

Egidius Wilson (by 1530-63/67), of Redland, Gloucestershire, was an English Member of Parliament (MP).

He was a Member of the Parliament of England for Grampound in March 1553.
