= Richard West (Lord Chancellor of Ireland) =

English barrister, judge and politician (1691–1726)

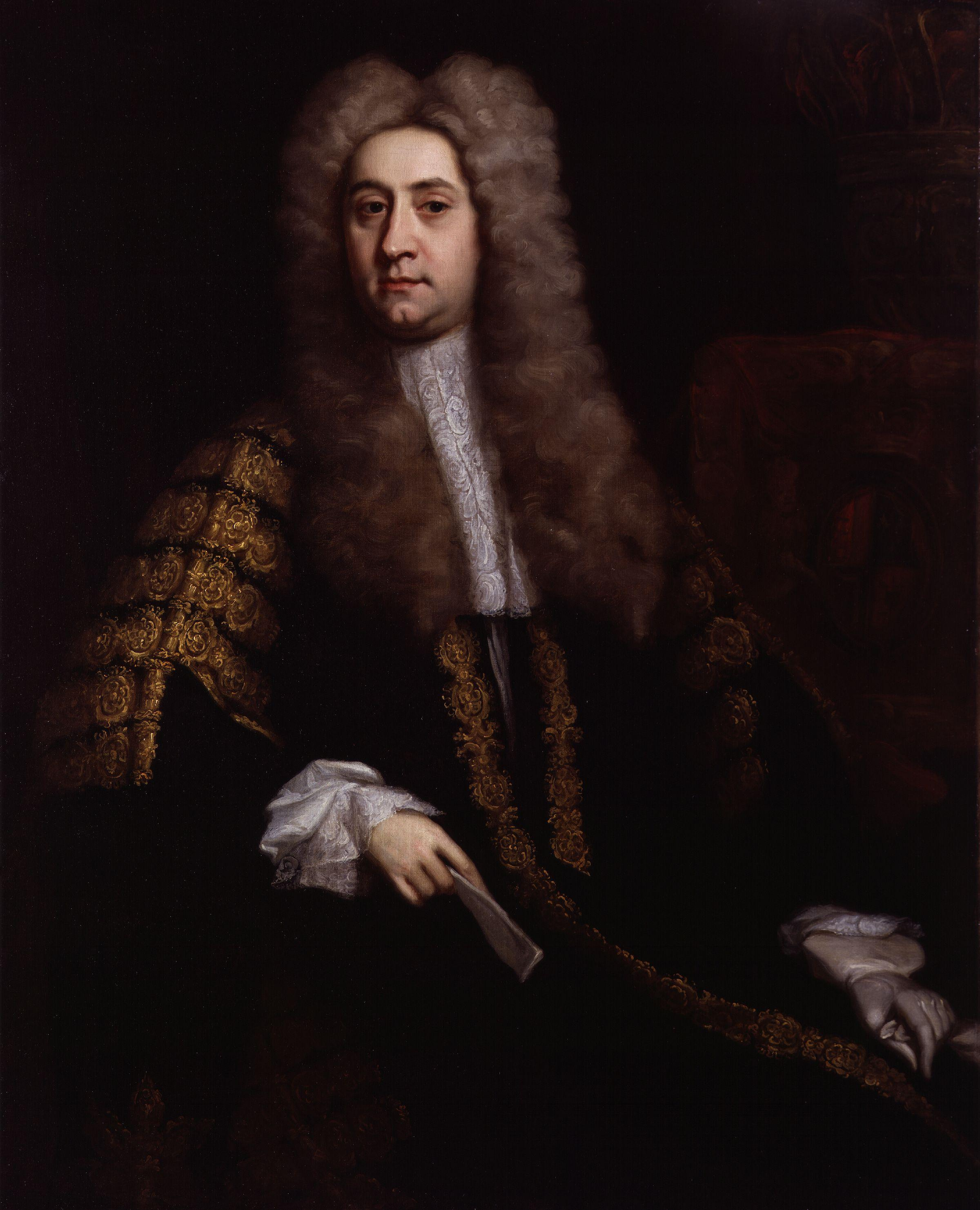
c. 1725 portrait of West attributed to Jonathan Richardson

Richard West (c. 1691 – 3 December 1726) was an English barrister, judge, playwright and politician who represented Grampound and Bodmin in the House of Commons of Great Britain from 1721 to 1726. He also served as Lord Chancellor of Ireland from 1725 to 1726.

== Background ==
West was born in London, son of Richard West senior, a merchant (who outlived him). His sister married another merchant John Glover, and was the mother of Richard Glover the poet. The future poet is said to have been something of a favourite of his uncle.

== Career ==
West was called to the bar in 1714 and became one of its leaders in a remarkably short time; he was made King's Counsel and a Bencher of the Inner Temple in 1717. He was returned as member of parliament for Grampound at a by-election in 1721. At the 1722 general election he was returned as MP for Bodmin. In the House of Commons, he made his reputation as one of the managers of the impeachment of Thomas Parker, 1st Earl of Macclesfield, the Lord Chancellor on charges of corruption in 1725: his speech for the prosecution was described as "masterly". Shortly afterwards he went to Ireland as Lord Chancellor, although it was said that he would have preferred to be Recorder of London. It is believed that his friend Archbishop Hugh Boulter, who had recently been translated to the see of Armagh, and wanted West to join him in Ireland, played a part in persuading him.

As Lord Chancellor he gained a reputation for harshly enforcing the anti-Catholic penal laws, encouraging informers to discover secret trusts by Protestant trustees in favour of Catholics. In Leymore v Bourke he extended the penal laws to cover not only Catholics but Protestants who married them. West was also noted for his charm and intelligence and his early death was much mourned: his old friend Hugh Boulter, the Archbishop of Armagh, wrote that "his death is much lamented here by all.... I am very much troubled by this loss, as well as I am heartily concerned for the terrible blow it is to his family".

== West as author ==
West was most unusual among judges in having a play produced while he was in office: Hecuba, his translation of a French tragedy, was produced at the Drury Lane Theatre. As even its author sadly admitted it was not a popular success, closing after only three performances, two of them to empty houses. He was more successful as a pamphleteer, his best-known works being A Discourse concerning Treasons and Bills of Attainder (1716 ) and An Inquiry into the Origins and Manner of Creating Peers (1719).

== Family ==
West married Elizabeth Burnet, daughter of Gilbert Burnet, Bishop of Salisbury and his Dutch-born second wife Mary Scott (Maria Schotte); rumours that she was unfaithful to him seem to have no basis. They had two children, Richard Jr, and Molly, who married John Williams. Richard West Jr (1716- 1742) before his early death had made something of a name as a poet: he is still remembered for his friendship with Thomas Gray, celebrated in Gray's Sonnet on the death of Richard West.

== Death ==
In November 1726 West became ill "with a great cold and fever", but since he was still only about thirty-five, and seemed to be responding well to treatment, his case was not thought to be serious; on 3 December however he unexpectedly died. Rumours that he was poisoned, whether by his wife or by a political enemy, are without foundation. He is buried in St. Ann's Church, Dawson Street, Dublin.

== Aftermath ==
His early death left his family in severe financial difficulty, especially as his father, who outlived him by a few months, left no will and according to the legal advice they received West's widow and children had no claim to his estate. What had become of the widow's own money is unclear, but it should certainly have been enough to live on: her Dutch mother Mary Scott had been a great heiress, and her father the Bishop in his own will had provided generously for all his children. Her husband on the other hand left "just enough to clear his debts in both countries".

Mrs West's reputation also suffered from rumours, almost certainly false, that she was having an affair with her husband's secretary John Williams, later her son-in-law, and even wilder rumours that they had poisoned him. King George I was persuaded to grant her a pension, which George II continued. Despite the pension she fell on hard times and spent her last years as a dependent of Josiah Tucker, the Dean of Gloucester.

Parliament of Great Britain
Preceded by Hon. John West; Sir Charles Cooke	Member of Parliament for Grampound; 1721–1722; With: Hon. John West	Succeeded by Marquess of Hartington; Humphry Morice
Preceded by John Legh; Earl of Burford	Member of Parliament for Bodmin; 1722–1726; With: Isaac le Heup	Succeeded by Isaac le Heup; John LaRoche
Political offices
Preceded by The Viscount Midleton	Lord Chancellor of Ireland; 1725–1726	Succeeded by Thomas Wyndham
