= Thomas Nicolls =

English politician

Thomas Nicolls (by 1529–1568), of the Rectory, Pytchley, Northamptonshire, and the Old Bailey, London, was an English Member of Parliament (MP).

He was a Member of the Parliament of England for Grampound in March 1553.
