= Philip Goodwin (divine) =

English divine

Philip Goodwin (died 1699) was an English divine.

== Life ==
Goodwin, a native of Suffolk, was educated at St John's College, Cambridge, and proceeded M.A. in 1630. During the First English Civil War he sided with the Parliamentarians, and was appointed one of the 'triers' for Hertfordshire. By an ordinance of the lords and commons, dated 23 April 1645, he became vicar of Watford in that county, in succession to Cornelius Burges, but was ejected for nonconformity in June 1661. He later conformed, and on 4 October 1673 was presented to the rectory of Liston, Essex, by William Clopton, whose daughter Lucy he had married.

Goodwin died in 1699. His will, dated 29 September 1697, mentions property at Broome and Aldham in Suffolk. His children were Robert (who succeeded to his father's living), Thomas, Margaret, and Lucy.

== Works ==
While living at Watford he published:

- The Evangelicall Communicant in the Eucharisticall Sacrament, or a Treatise declaring who are to receive the Supper of the Lord, &c., London, 1649; second impression enlarged, &c., 8vo, London, 1657.
- Dies Dominicus redivivus, or the Lord's Day enlivened, or a treatise … to discover the practical part of the evangelical Sabbath, &c., London, 1654.
- Religio domestica rediviva, or family religion revived, &c., London, 1655.
- The Mystery of Dreames, historically discoursed; or a treatise wherein is clearly discovered the secret yet certain good or evil … of mens differing dreames; their distinguishing characters, &c., London, 1658.
