= William Stoughton (English constitutionalist) =

Sixteenth-seventeenth century English MP, writer and republican

William Stoughton developed the most complete and insightful version of classical republicanism that had yet appeared in England.

== Biography ==
William Stoughton was the first student to matriculate to Christ Church, Oxford and then was elected to the Westminster School in 1561. He took his Bachelor of Arts in 1565, a Master of Arts in 1568, and supplicated for his Bachelor of Civil Law in November 1571. Moving to Leicestershire after receiving his Bachelor of Civil Law, he was probably a client of the Earl of Huntingdon. He probably knew Thomas Wood and Anthony Gilby, radical puritans who were friends of the Earl. "Stoughton operated as a radical puritan "mole" within the Court of Arches, using his position as lay commissary to protect his friends in the parish of Groby, a puritan hotbed and a peculiar jurisdiction of the Court of Arches, from scrutiny by more rigorous elements inside the court."

He sat in Parliament for Grampound from 1584 to 1585 and took a role in leading religious agitation. His An abstract of certaine acts of parlement (1584) attacked episcopal pretensions, their civil functions and their seats in Parliament.

Stoughton also wrote An assertion for true and Christian church-policie (1604). After 40 years where the language of mixed government died out in political language and the thought of men, he revived the old Elizabethan debate and theory over the three estates.
