= Henry Swann =

British Tory politician

Henry Swann (c. November 1763 – 24 April 1824) was a British Tory politician. He sat in the House of Commons for three periods between 1803 and 1824.

Swann was elected at a by-election in September 1803 as a Member of Parliament (MP) for the borough of Yarmouth on the Isle of Wight. However he resigned his seat early in 1804, through appointment as Steward of the Chiltern Hundreds.

He returned to the Commons two years later, when he was elected at the 1806 general election for the borough of Penryn in Cornwall. He was re-elected in 1807, 1812, and 1818, but his 1818 victory was declared void after an election petition was lodged. The seat remained vacant until the 1820 general election, when he was returned again, holding the seat until his death in 1824.

On Friday, 11 October 1811, Henry Swann officiated at the laying of the first stone for the new Waterloo Bridge over the Thames River in London. The bridge was to be constructed of grey granite which was to be quarried near Penryn, Cornwall, Swann's constituency. A bottle of coins from the reign of the current king, George III, was placed inside that first stone.

Parliament of the United Kingdom
Preceded by Col. Charles Macdonnell; Jervoise Clarke Jervoise	Member of Parliament for Yarmouth, Isle of Wight; 1803–1804; With: Jervoise Clarke Jervoise	Succeeded by John Delgarno; Jervoise Clarke Jervoise
Preceded by Sir Stephen Lushington, Bt; Sir John Nicholl	Member of Parliament for Penryn; 1806–1819; With: Sir Christopher Hawkins, Bt 1806 – Feb 1807; John Bettesworth-Trevanion Feb–May 1807; Charles Lemon May 1807–1812; Philip Gell 1812–1818; Sir Christopher Hawkins, Bt from 1818	Succeeded by Sir Christopher Hawkins, Bt; 2nd seat vacant
Preceded by Sir Christopher Hawkins, Bt; 2nd seat vacant	Member of Parliament for Penryn; 1820–1824; With: Pascoe Grenfell	Succeeded by Pascoe Grenfell; Robert Stanton
