= John Teed =

English merchant, banker and politician

John Teed (c. 1770 – before 1837) was an English merchant, banker, and politician.

Born to a family from Devon, by around 1804 Teed was established as a ship agent, banker, and merchant in Plymouth. In 1806 he unsuccessfully sought election to Parliament from Fowey, a rotten borough in nearby Cornwall, along with Admiral Alexander Cochrane. In 1808 he achieved election from another rotten borough, Grampound, with the support of Grampound patron Christopher Hawkins, but was unseated two months later after a petition by the other candidates, two more Cochranes (George Cochrane and Andrew Cochrane-Johnstone), financed by a fourth brother, the nabob Basil Cochrane. Teed ultimately deserted the Hawkins interest and was elected anew in 1812 with Andrew Cochrane-Johnstone, serving until 1818.

Teed was a reliable supporter of the Tory government of the Earl of Liverpool until 1817; after his defeat in the 1818 election in Grampound he helped expose corruption in the elections there, testifying against Manasseh Masseh Lopes. The revelations led to the suppression of the Grampound constituency in 1821.

== Family ==
Teed married Hannah Godfrey (d. 1855) c. 1793; they had at least 3 sons and 2 daughters. His son John Godfrey Teed (1794-1871) became a barrister at Gray's Inn, Queen's Counsel, and a judge of the Lincoln County court. Thomas Teed (1797-1843) became a lawyer in India; he was the father of writer and philanthropist Ellen Hollond. Henry Cowd Teed (d. 1831) married Frances Marie, a daughter of jurist William Rothery, in 1823, but she died the following year; in 1829 he remarried to a woman named Maria Robertson.
