= Ebenezer John Collett =

Ebenezer John Collett (22 May 1755 - 31 October 1833) was an English hop merchant who served as Tory MP for the rotten borough of Grampound from 1814 to 1818, then MP for Cashel from 1819 to 1830.

Collett unsuccessfully contested the Great Grimsby parliamentary seat in 1812, but was returned on a vacancy for Grampound two years later on the interest of Sir Christopher Hawkins. He voted against Catholic relief in 1816 and 1817, and also against education of the poor in 1818.

Defeated at Grampound in 1818, he was found a seat at Cashel by Sir Robert Peel, as he had given ‘a never failing support’ and was ‘a Protestant’. He duly voted against Catholic relief again in 1819. Although representing an Irish constituency, he never went to Ireland, but held his seat until 1830.

Collett was the fourth son of Joseph Collett of Hemel Hempstead and Sarah née Smith. He married Margaret Alsager (died 7 March 1826), daughter of cloth merchant Thomas Alsager, on 17 November 1795.
