= Andrew Quick (MP) =

British Member of Parliament (1666–1736)

Andrew Quick (1666-1736), of Newton St. Cyres, Devon, was an English Member of Parliament.

He was a Member (MP) of the Parliament of Great Britain for Ashburton (30 March 1711 - 1713) and for Grampound (1713–1715).
