= Grampound (constituency) =

Parliamentary constituency in the United Kingdom, 1801–1821

Coordinates: 50.298°N 4.900°W

- Former borough constituency for the House of Commons

1547–1826
- Seats: Two
- Replaced by: Cornwall

Grampound in Cornwall was a borough constituency of the House of Commons of the Parliament of England, then of the Parliament of Great Britain from 1707 to 1800 and of the Parliament of the United Kingdom from 1801 to 1826. It was represented by two Members of Parliament.

== History ==
Grampound's market was on a Saturday and the town had a glove factory. Grampound was created a Borough by a charter of King Edward VI with a Mayor, eight Aldermen, a Recorder, and a Town Clerk. In 1547 it sent members to Parliament for the first time, one of a number of rotten boroughs in Cornwall established during the Tudor period.

=== Boundaries ===
The constituency was a Parliamentary borough in Cornwall, covering Grampound, a market town 8 miles (13 km) from Truro on the River Fal.

=== Franchise ===
The franchise for the borough was in the hands of Mayor, Recorder, Aldermen and any Freemen created by the council. In 1816, T. H. B. Oldfield wrote that there were 42 voters in all. Given that the borough had 80 houses, this meant that the franchise was extended well into the working class.

While several patrons (including the Earls of Mount Edgcumbe, Lord Eliot, Sir Christopher Hawkins and Basil Cochrane) attempted to exert their influence over the choice of members to serve Grampound, the electors were more interested in the monetary value of their vote. Oldfield wrote "The freemen of this borough have been known to boast of receiving three hundred guineas a man for their votes at one election." The voters were used to getting regular payments through the year and received special payments for events like sickness and funerals, with one historian comparing the arrangement to "general free insurance". So notorious and unmanageable did the borough become that Grampound became a byword for electoral corruption, and Edward Porritt noted its use was continuing in 1903.

=== Disfranchisement for corruption ===
Disfranchisement of Grampound Act 1821
- Act of Parliament
- Parliament of the United Kingdom
- Long title: An act to indemnify Persons who shall give Evidence before the Lords Spiritual and Temporal on the Bill to exclude the Borough of Grampound, in the County of Cornwall, from sending Burgesses to serve in Parliament; and to enable the Borough of Leeds, in the County of York, to send Two Burgesses to serve in Parliament in lieu thereof.
- Citation: 1 & 2 Geo. 4. c. 21
- Territorial extent: United Kingdom

Dates
- Royal assent: 6 April 1821
- Commencement: 6 April 1821 (Note: The Acts of Parliament (Commencement) Act 1793.)
- Repealed: 5 August 1863
Other legislation
Repealed by	Statute Law Revision Act 1873
Relates to	Disfranchisement of Grampound (No. 2) Act 1821

Status: Repealed

Text of statute as originally enacted

Disfranchisement of Grampound (No. 2) Act 1821
- Act of Parliament
- Parliament of the United Kingdom
- Long title: An act to exclude the Borough of Grampound, in the County of Cornwall, from sending Burgesses to serve in Parliament; and to enable the County of York to send Two additional Knights to serve in Parliament, in lieu thereof.
- Citation: 1 & 2 Geo. 4. c. 47
- Territorial extent: United Kingdom

Dates
- Royal assent: 8 June 1821
- Commencement: 8 June 1821
- Repealed: 5 August 1873
Other legislation
Repealed by	Statute Law Revision Act 1873
Relates to	Disfranchisement of Grampound Act 1821

Status: Repealed

Text of statute as originally enacted

Finally, after the return of two members in the 1818 general election was overturned by a petition alleging gross bribery, Lord John Russell moved to disfranchise Grampound and to transfer the two members to a new Parliamentary Borough of Leeds. The usual treatment for a borough which had perpetual bribery (as practiced in New Shoreham in 1770, Cricklade in 1782, Aylesbury in 1804 and East Retford in 1828) was to expand its boundaries and franchise into an area free of corruption but that was not possible in Grampound where the neighbouring towns were also parliamentary boroughs and increasing the electorate would simply increase the pool of potential bribed voters.

After a delay caused by the accession of King George IV and the scandal of Queen Caroline's return and the Pains and Penalties Bill 1820, Russell introduced a Bill in January 1821. The suggestion of Leeds as a new borough met with resistance because of the large number of working class voters who would be enfranchised, and when an amendment to raise the qualification was passed, Russell withdrew his Bill; however, the mover of the amendment introduced his own. The House of Lords amended the Bill to give the two members instead to the county of Yorkshire, an amendment accepted and which eventually went into law. Grampound was disfranchised by the Disfranchisement of Grampound (No. 2) Act 1821 (1 & 2 Geo. 4. c. 47), with royal assent on 8 June 1821.

The two members who had been returned in the 1820 general election, John Innes and Alexander Robertson, retained their seats under the Act until the end of the Parliament, with a provision that if they should die or resign their seats, then replacements would be elected by the Yorkshire constituency rather than Grampound. They both retained their seats until the dissolution of Parliament in 1826, whereupon their constituency ceased to exist.

== Members of Parliament ==
=== 1547–1629 ===
Parliament	First member	Second member
Parliament of 1547	Henry Knollys	Peter Sainthill
First Parliament of 1553	Thomas Nicolls	Egidius Wilson
Second Parliament of 1553	Sir Thomas Smith	Sir William Smythwick
Parliament of 1554	Richard Chappell	Sir Thomas Cornwallis
Parliament of 1554–1555	Robert Vaughan	George Tedlowe
Parliament of 1555	Richard Chappell	John Harris
Parliament of 1558	Thomas Herle	Robert Rychers
Parliament of 1559	Sir John Radcliffe	Ralph Couch
Parliament of 1562	Sir John Pollard	Christopher Perne
1566	Perne declared lunatic, replaced by John Dodmer	
Parliament of 1571	Edward Clere	John Hussey
Parliament of 1572–1581	Edmund Slyfield	John Hussey
Parliament of 1584–1585	William Stoughton	Charles Trevanion
Parliament of 1586–1587	Thomas Cromwell	John Herbert
Parliament of 1588–1589	Thomas Cromwell	Richard Sayer
Parliament of 1593	Richard Edgecumbe	Edward Jones
Parliament of 1597–1598	Sir John Leigh	Robert Newdigate
Parliament of 1601	Sir John Gray	John Astell
Parliament of 1604–1611	William Noy	(Sir) Francis Barnham
Addled Parliament (1614)	Thomas St Aubyn	(Sir) Francis Barnham
Parliament of 1621–1622	John Hampden	Sir Robert Carey
Happy Parliament (1624–1625)	John Mohun	Richard Edgcumbe
Useless Parliament (1625)	John Mohun	Sir Samuel Rolle
Parliament of 1625–1626	Edward Thomas	Thomas St Aubyn
Parliament of 1628–1629	Lord Carey	Sir Robert Pye
No Parliament summoned 1629–1640

=== 1640–1821 ===
Election	First member	First party	Second member	Second party
April 1640	William Coryton		John Trevanion	Royalist
November 1640	William Coryton		James Campbell	Parliamentarian
1640	Sir John Trevor	Parliamentarian	James Campbell	Parliamentarian
December 1648	Sir John Trevor	Parliamentarian	Campbell excluded in Pride's Purge – seat vacant	
1653	Grampound was unrepresented in the Barebones Parliament and the First and Second Parliaments of the Protectorate			
January 1659	Thomas Herle		Robert Scawen	
May 1659	Sir John Trevor		One seat vacant	
April 1660	Thomas Herle		Hugh Boscawen	
October 1660	John Tanner		Hugh Boscawen	
1661	John Tanner		Charles Trevanion	
February 1679	Sir Joseph Tredenham	Tory	Charles Trevanion	
August 1679	John Tanner		Nicholas Herle	
1685	Sir Joseph Tredenham	Tory	Robert Foley	
1689	Edward Herle		John Tanner	
1690	Walter Vincent		John Tanner	
1692	John Buller		John Tanner	
1695	Hugh Fortescue		John Tanner	
1698	Sir William Scawen		John Tanner	
1699	Sir William Scawen		Francis Scobell	
1702	James Craggs	Whig	Francis Scobell	
1708	James Craggs	Whig	Thomas Scawen	
1710	James Craggs	Whig	Thomas Coke	
1713	Andrew Quick		Thomas Coke	
1715	Hon. John West		Charles Cooke	
1721	Hon. John West		Richard West	
1722	Marquess of Hartington	Whig	Humphry Morice	Whig
1727	Philip Hawkins		Humphry Morice	Whig
1732	Philip Hawkins		Isaac le Heup	
1734	Philip Hawkins		Thomas Hales	Whig
1739	Thomas Trefusis		Thomas Hales	Whig
1741	Daniel Boone		William Banks	
1747	Lord George Bentinck		Thomas Hawkins	
1754	Merrick Burrell		Simon Fanshawe	
1768	Grey Cooper		Charles Wolfran Cornwall	
1774	Hon. Sir Joseph Yorke	Whig	Richard Neville	
1780	Sir John Ramsden, Bt		Thomas Lucas	
1784	Hon. John Somers Cocks		Francis Baring	Whig
1790	Thomas Wallace		Jeremiah Crutchley	
1796	Bryan Edwards		Robert Sewell	
1800	Sir Christopher Hawkins	Tory	Robert Sewell	
1802	Sir Christopher Hawkins	Tory	Benjamin Hobhouse	
1806	Sir Christopher Hawkins	Tory	Henry Fawcett	
1807	Hon. Andrew Cochrane-Johnstone		Hon. George Cochrane	
March 1808	Robert Williams		John Teed	
May 1808	William Holmes	Tory	Hon. George Cochrane	
1812	William Holmes	Tory	Hon. Andrew Cochrane-Johnstone	
1812	John Teed		Hon. Andrew Cochrane-Johnstone	
1814	John Teed		Ebenezer John Collett	
1818	John Innes		Alexander Robertson	

- Constituency disenfranchised for corruption (1821)

== Elections ==
As with most boroughs in the unreformed House of Commons, Grampound was uncontested at most elections. The only contested elections after 1660 were:

- 1741: The sitting members, Thomas Hales and Thomas Trefusis, (who were supporters of Robert Walpole) were challenged by Daniel Boone and William Banks. Hales and Trefusis were supported by Richard Edgcumbe who was managing the Cornish Boroughs for the Government and controlled the Grampound corporation, but Boone and Banks arranged for an alternate Mayor to be elected and indemnified the Sheriff of the County against any legal expenses if he delivered the writs for the election to their Mayor and was sued. They secured their election by 27 votes to 23, while an alternative poll by the original Mayor returned Hales and Trefusis with 35 votes to 17 for their opponents. However, Hales and Trefusis declined to press their challenge through an election petition.

General election 1741: Grampound (2 seats)
Party	Candidate	Votes	%	±%
N/A	Daniel Boone	27	27%	N/A
N/A	William Banks	27	27%	N/A
N/A	Thomas Hales	23	23%	N/A
N/A	Thomas Trefusis	23	23%	N/A

- 1754: Sir John St Aubyn, Bt and Francis Beauchamp were proposed as candidates apparently without their knowledge by local malcontent voters who wanted to raise the level of their bribery. They secured 13 votes to 31 for Merrick Burrell and Simon Fanshawe, who were government candidates.

General election 1754: Grampound (2 seats)
Party	Candidate	Votes	%	±%
N/A	Merrick Burrell	31	35%	N/A
N/A	Simon Fanshawe	31	35%	N/A
N/A	John St Aubyn	13	15%	N/A
N/A	Francis Beauchamp	13	15%	N/A

General election 1796: Grampound (2 seats)
Party	Candidate	Votes	%	±%
N/A	Bryan Edwards	12	33%	N/A
N/A	Robert Sewell	12	33%	N/A
N/A	Lord Grey of Groby	6	17%	N/A
N/A	Jeremiah Crutchley	6	17%	N/A

General election 1807: Grampound (2 seats)
Party	Candidate	Votes	%	±%
N/A	Andrew Cochrane-Johnstone	27	33%	N/A
N/A	George Frederick Augustus Cochrane	27	33%	N/A
N/A	Robert Williams	14	17%	N/A
N/A	Henry Baring	13	16%	N/A

- Election declared void, 7 March 1808
- 1808: Robert Williams (1767–1847) and John Teed 14; George Cochrane and William Holmes 13 by first returning officer. Cochrane and Holmes 27; Williams and Teed 14 by second returning officer. Williams and Teed seated on petition, 10 May 1808.

By-Election 1808: Grampound
Party	Candidate	Votes	%	±%
N/A	Robert Williams	14	26%	N/A
N/A	John Teed	14	26%	N/A
N/A	George Frederick Augustus Cochrane	13	24%	N/A
N/A	William Holmes	13	24%	N/A

General election 1812: Grampound (2 seats)
Party	Candidate	Votes	%	±%
N/A	John Teed	55	47%	N/A
N/A	Andrew Cochrane-Johnstone	34	29%	N/A
N/A	Charles Trelawny Brereton	28	24%	N/A
N/A	William Holmes	0	16%	N/A
N/A	William Congreve	0	16%	N/A

- Andrew Cochrane-Johnstone expelled for committing stock fraud

By-Election 1814: Grampound
Party	Candidate	Votes	%	±%
N/A	Ebenezer John Collett	45	90%	N/A
N/A	George Conway Montagu	5	10%	N/A

General election 1818: Grampound (2 seats)
Party	Candidate	Votes	%	±%
N/A	John Innes (MP)	36	34%	N/A
N/A	Alexander Robertson	36	34%	N/A
N/A	John Teed	11	10%	N/A
N/A	Ebenezer John Collett	11	10%	N/A
N/A	Benjamin Shaw	11	10%	N/A
N/A	William Allen	1	1%	N/A

== See also ==
- List of former United Kingdom Parliament constituencies

== Bibliography ==
- "Representative History of Great Britain and Ireland" by Thomas Hinton Burley Oldfield (Baldwin, Cradock and Joy, London, 1816)
- "Return of Members of Parliament" (1878)
- "The Unreformed House of Commons by Edward Porritt (Cambridge University Press, 1903)
- "Members of the Long Parliament" by D. Brunton and D. H. Pennington (George Allen and Unwin, 1954)
- "The Parliaments of England from 1715 to 1847" by Henry Stooks Smith (2nd edition, edited by F. W. S Craig – Chichester: Parliamentary Reference Publications, 1973)
- Willis, Browne (1750). Notitia Parliamentaria, Part II: A Series or Lists of the Representatives in the several Parliaments held from the Reformation 1541, to the Restoration 1660 ... London. p. 1.
- Cobbett's Parliamentary history of England, from the Norman Conquest in 1066 to the year 1803 (London: Thomas Hansard, 1808)
- Maija Jansson (ed.), Proceedings in Parliament, 1614 (House of Commons) (Philadelphia: American Philosophical Society, 1988)
- Leigh Rayment's Historical List of MPs – Constituencies beginning with "G" (part 2)
