= Sir Christopher Hawkins, 1st Baronet =

British politician (1758–1829)

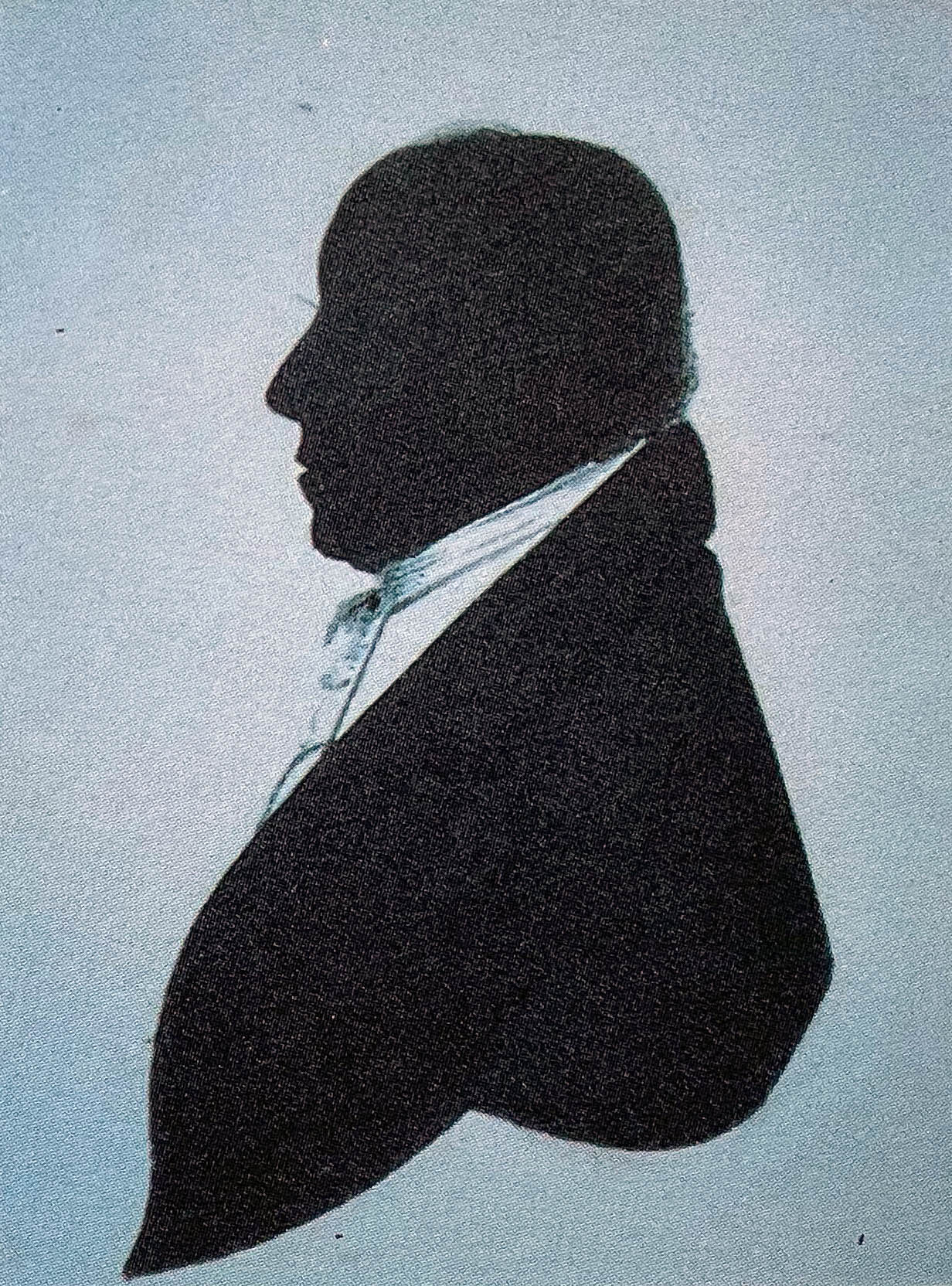
Painted silhouette of Sir Christopher Hawkins of Trewithen; his only known portrait.

Sir Christopher Hawkins, 1st Baronet, FRS (29 May 1758 – 6 April 1829) was a Cornish landowner, mine-owner, Tory Member of Parliament, and patron of steam power. He was Recorder of Grampound, of Tregony, and of St Ives, Cornwall. He was a member of the Hawkins family.

== The Hawkins family ==
Christopher Hawkins was the second son of Thomas Hawkins of Trewithen, a considerable landowner and former MP for Grampound. Thomas Hawkins had a lifelong fear of smallpox and died following an inoculation to prevent it. Christopher's elder brother John was drowned in the River Thames whilst at Eton, whilst a younger brother Thomas died "of a fever in consequence of eating an ice-cream after dancing." His youngest brother, John Hawkins, survived and became a noted geologist. On his father's death in 1766, Christopher inherited his estates.

== Career as MP ==
Hawkins was appointed High Sheriff of Cornwall for 1783. He then followed in his father's footsteps by becoming a member of parliament at the age of 26. He subsequently earned notoriety as the leading commoner engaged in 'boroughmongering', the purchase and sale of rotten boroughs, parliamentary constituencies that had very few electors and as a result could be bought and sold through patronage, influence, and straightforward bribery. At his peak, Hawkins wholly or partly controlled six such boroughs, each returning two MPs, giving him the ability to ensure the successful election of candidates in return for cash or favours. He normally reserved these seats for government (Tory party) supporters.

He himself was MP for several of his own Cornish boroughs, namely Grampound from 1800 to 1807, Mitchell from 1784 to 1799 and again from 1806 to 1807, Penryn from 1806 to 1807 and again from 1818 to 1820, and St Ives from 1821 to 1828. His appearances in the chamber of the house were not memorable. He appears to have spoken just four times: once very briefly in 1807, when charged with bribery he left "his case entirely to the justice and liberality of the house", twice in 1819 with regard to the Penryn Bribery Bill, when, according to Hansard, he was on both occasions "quite inaudible", and once in 1827 when he was "totally inaudible".

=== Later scandal ===
Following the 1806 Penryn election, Hawkins was found guilty of bribery by a parliamentary committee and dispossessed of his seat, but unusually was not barred from the House. Since he had also been elected MP for Grampound and for Mitchell, he remained in the House of Commons, albeit under considerable censure. The Attorney General had been asked to take up the charge and Hawkins was sent for trial at Bodmin Assize Court in 1808, but was there acquitted. The political reformer William Cobbett attended and reported on the trial, and was less than impressed by its outcome. In 1810, the bribery charge and ensuing bad feeling led to Hawkins fighting a duel with his fellow boroughmonger and former Whig MP for Penryn Lord Dunstanville. Neither party was injured.

Hawkins earned himself a reputation as a miser and it was claimed that, to reduce election expenses, he pulled down the houses of electors on his land thus depriving them of the right to vote. In this way, he was said to have reduced the number of electors at Mitchell to three.

=== Father of the House ===
Escutcheon of the Hawkins baronets of Trewithen

For his service to the Tory government, Hawkins was created a baronet in 1791 by William Pitt the Younger and by the time of his death had become Father of the House.

== Land and mine-owner ==
Sir Christopher inherited considerable estates from his father, but assiduously purchased additional land, eventually claiming that he could "ride from one side of Cornwall to the other without setting hoof on another man's soil." He bought well over a dozen manors, many of them – such as the manors of Grampound, of Mitchell, and of St Ives – to gain possession of rotten boroughs.

He acquired the manors of Cargoll and of Trelundra to further his interests in Mitchell, but whilst attempting to improve some wasteland in Cargoll by deep-ploughing, lead ore was discovered. Sir Christopher set up the Old Shepherds Mine to exploit the lead and found additional silver, making the mine a considerable source of profit before it closed in 1820. Silver-lead ore (galena) was also discovered at East Wheal Rose in 1812, which grew to briefly be the largest lead mine in the country. East Wheal Rose was also the site of Cornwall's worst mining disaster in 1846 when 39 miners drowned in a flood. In 1818 he opened a copper and tin mine at St Ives, later known as St Ives Consols. At his stream works at Ladock, near Grampound, gold was found as well as tin. A specimen of Ladock gold was presented to the Royal Geological Society of Cornwall by Sir Christopher, who also published observations on the find in their Transactions. Sir Christopher was a partner in the Cornish Copper Company which established a smelting works at Copperhouse, built a canal to Hayle and extended the harbour there to export metal and import coal, timber, and other goods. He owned china clay mines in the St Austell area and substantially rebuilt the harbour at Pentewan to serve as a china clay port, connected to St Austell by the Pentewan Railway, a horse-drawn tramway.

Sir Christopher obtained the post of Vice Lord Warden of the Stannaries, giving him considerable influence and control over mines and mining in Cornwall.

=== Trewithen House and gardens ===
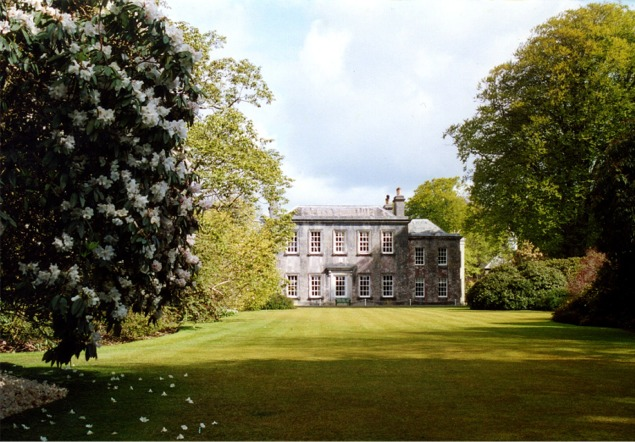
Trewithen House

The family home of Trewithen, near Probus, was purchased by Philip Hawkins of Trewinnard in 1715 and substantially and grandly rebuilt. His nephew, Sir Christopher's father, inherited the house in 1738 and was responsible for much of its landscaping. Sir Christopher, known locally as "Sir Kit", extended the grounds but added little to the house, reinforcing his reputation as a miser among his local tenants. The following verse was said to have been fixed to the gates of Trewithen:

A large house, and no cheer,
A large park, and no deer,
A large cellar, and no beer,
Sir Christopher Hawkins lives here.

Trewithen House, now a Grade I listed building, is still privately owned by a family descendant. It houses a portrait of Sir Christopher and is open to the public. The dairy farm at Trewithen supplies milk for the production of the ice cream made by Kelly's of Cornwall in Bodmin.

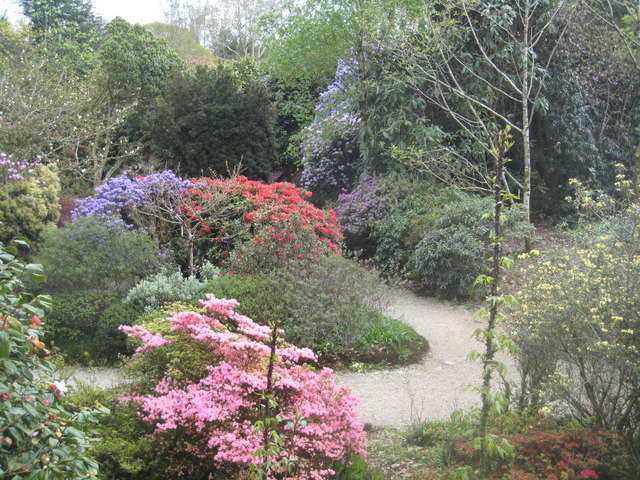
Trewithen Gardens

The garden at Trewithen was made by G. H. Johnstone VMH; it covers about 23 acres and is noted for its design and for the large collection of camellias, magnolias and rhododendrons.

== Patron of steam, horticulture, and antiquarian pursuits ==
Sir Christopher was a Fellow of the Royal Society, of what was to become the Royal Horticultural Society, and of the Antiquarian Society. He was also a life subscriber to the Royal Institution.

In 1811 he published a short book entitled Observations on the Tin Trade of the Ancients in Cornwall, concerning his theories on the involvement of the Phoenicians in the mining and trading of Cornish tin.

Sir Christopher was a patron and supporter of the Cornish steam pioneer Richard Trevithick and in 1812 commissioned from him the world's first steam threshing machine, powered by a "semi-portable" barn engine. The machine continued in use till the 1880s and has been preserved by the Science Museum in London.

In 1813, he brought the Cornish Gillyflower apple, found in a cottage garden in Truro, to the attention of the Royal Horticultural Society who awarded him a silver medal "for his exertions". The apple is still grown today and is commercially available.

Sir Christopher never married. On his death, his estate passed to his youngest brother, John, and then to his nephew, Christopher Henry Thomas Hawkins.

== In fiction ==
He is a recurring character in the Poldark novels by Winston Graham, where he is depicted as a corrupt and cynical boroughmonger, but generous to his friends.

== See also ==
- John Hawkins - brother to Sir Christopher

Parliament of Great Britain
Preceded by Hon. William Hanger; Francis Hale	Member of Parliament for Mitchell; 1784–1799; With: David Howell to 1796; Sir Stephen Lushington, Bt from 1796	Succeeded by John Simpson; Sir Stephen Lushington, Bt
Preceded by Bryan Edwards; Robert Sewell	Member of Parliament for Grampound; July 1800 – Dec 1800; With: Robert Sewell	Succeeded by Parliament of the United Kingdom
Parliament of the United Kingdom
Preceded by Parliament of Great Britain	Member of Parliament for Grampound; 1801–1807; With: Robert Sewell to 1802; Benjamin Hobhouse 1802–1806; Henry Fawcett 1806–1807	Succeeded by Hon. George Cochrane; Robert Williams
Preceded by Sir John Nicholl; Sir Stephen Lushington, Bt	Member of Parliament for Penryn; 1806 – Feb 1807; With: Henry Swann	Succeeded by John Bettesworth-Trevanion; Henry Swann
Preceded by Philip Gell; Henry Swann	Member of Parliament for Penryn; 1818–1820; With: Henry Swann 1806–1819 vacant 1819–1820	Succeeded by Pascoe Grenfell; Henry Swann
Preceded by James Graham; Lyndon Evelyn	Member of Parliament for St Ives; 1821–1828; With: Lyndon Evelyn 1820–1826; James Halse 1826–1830	Succeeded by Charles Arbuthnot; James Halse
Baronetage of Great Britain
New creation	Baronet (of Trewithin); 1791–1829	Extinct
Preceded by Boughton-Rouse baronets	Hawkins baronets of Trewithin; 28 July 1791	Succeeded by Call baronets
