= Caesar Hawkins (disambiguation) =

Caesar Hawkins (1798 – 1884) was a surgeon and grandson of the 1st baronet.

Caesar Hawkins may also refer to:

- Sir Cæsar Hawkins, 1st Baronet (1711-1786) of the Hawkins baronets, also a surgeon
- Sir Cæsar Hawkins, 2nd Baronet (c. 1781–1793), of the Hawkins baronets
