= François Benjamin Courvoisier =

Swiss valet and murderer (1816-1840)

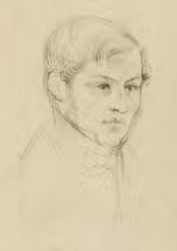
- Courvoisier at his trial
- Born: August 1816; Mont-la-Ville, Switzerland
- Died: 6 July 1840 (aged 23); Newgate Prison, London, England
- Status: Dead
- Criminal charge: Murder
- Penalty: Executed by hanging

Details
- Victims: Lord William Russell
- Locations: 14 Norfolk Street, Park Lane, London

François Benjamin Courvoisier (August 1816 – 6 July 1840) was a Swiss-born valet who was convicted of murdering his employer Lord William Russell in London, England, and hanged outside Newgate Prison on 6 July 1840. A crowd of around 40,000 witnessed his death, including Charles Dickens and William Makepeace Thackeray.

== Early life and career ==
Courvoisier was born in the small village of Mont-la-Ville, Switzerland, in August 1816, the son of Abraham Courvoisier, a farmer. He was educated at the local village school, after which he assisted his father in farm duties, before moving to England in 1836.

Based on evidence given at his trial in 1840, upon first arriving in England, for around a month, Courvoisier worked as a waiter at Madame Piolaine's Hotel du Port de Dieppe in Leicester Square, London.

Through the assistance of his uncle, who was employed as a butler by an English baronet, he secured a position as a footman in the household of Lady Julia Lockwood. After seven months, in March 1837, he moved to the home of John Minet Fector, Conservative M.P. for Dover, also as a footman, where he remained for three years. He left Fector for employment with Lord William on 31 March 1840.

== Valet to Lord William ==
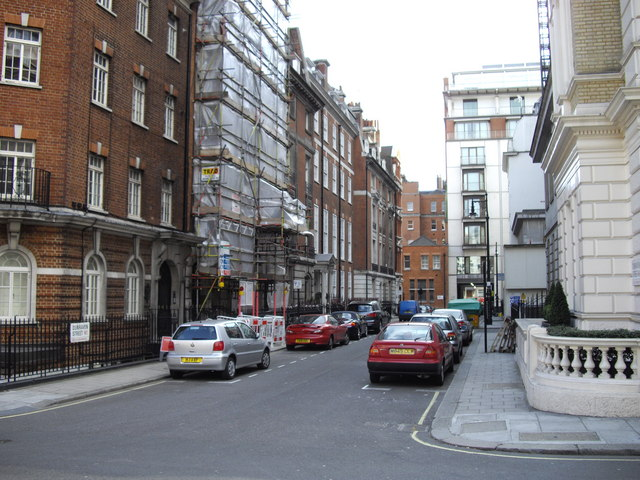
Location of the crime: Norfolk Street, now Dunraven Street, Mayfair.

In conversation with Lady Julia Lockwood, Lord William mentioned that his valet, Ellis, was leaving his employ. Lockwood recommended Courvoisier and, upon inquiry to Fector, was assured Courvoisier was of the 'highest character... conduct and competency to fill the situation'. He was employed on terms of £45 per annum, to be reviewed after six months upon which, if he had proved suitable, would be raised to £50.

Lord William's principal London residence was at No. 14 Norfolk Street, Park Lane, now Dunraven Street, Mayfair, although the building, along with others on the east side, has since been demolished. Described as 'a small house', it had two rooms per floor with a kitchen and pantry in the basement, two parlours (used for dining) on the ground floor, a drawing room and library on the floor above, Russell's bedroom and dressing room on the floor above that, and servants' rooms on the top floor. Aside from Courvoisier, Mary Hannell, the cook and Sarah Mancer, the housemaid were the only resident staff, a groom and coachman lived elsewhere.

== Crime and trial ==
Murder of Lord William Russell in The Chronicles of Newgate

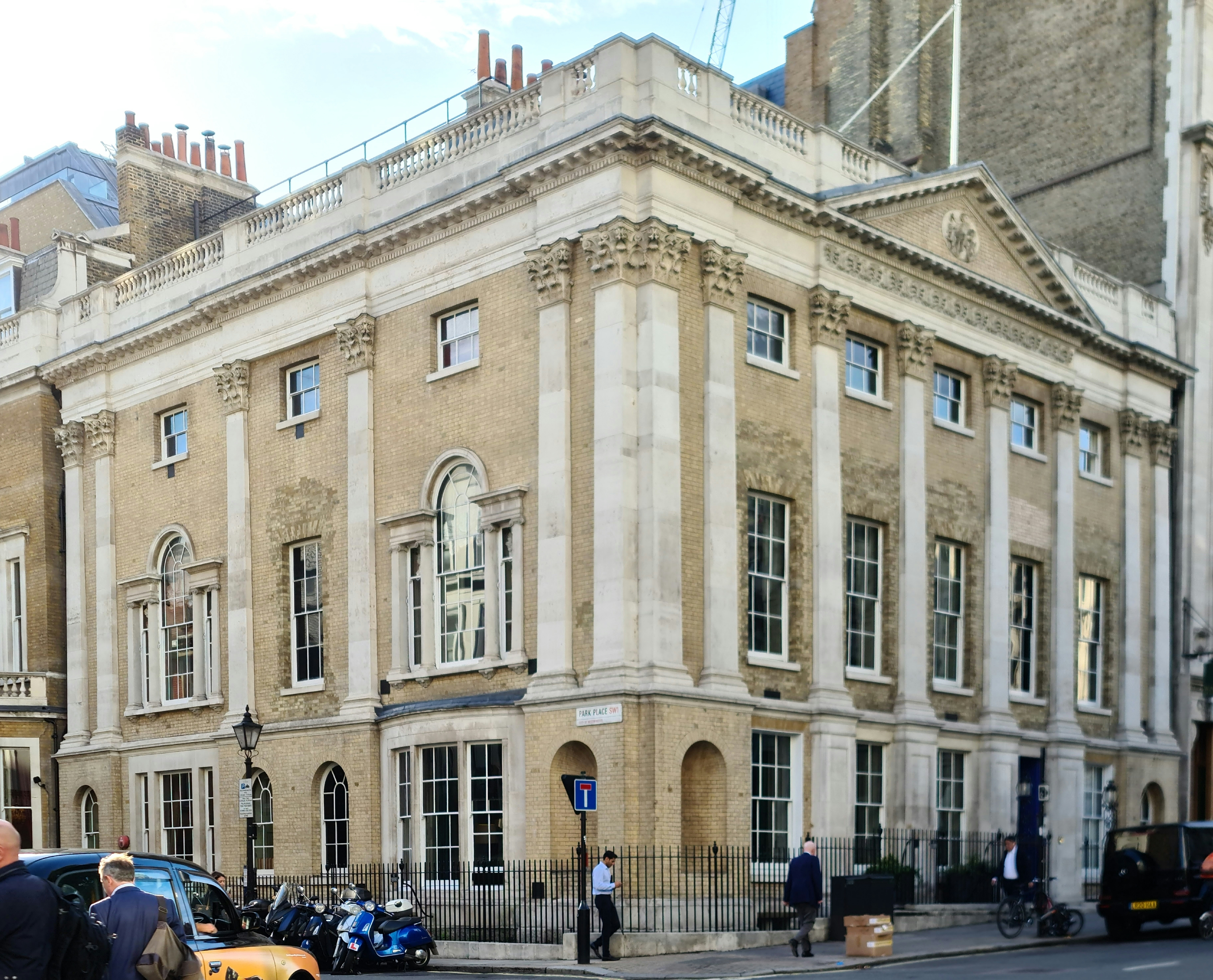
Brooks's club in St James's Street, London, where Lord William Russell spent the day before the crime.

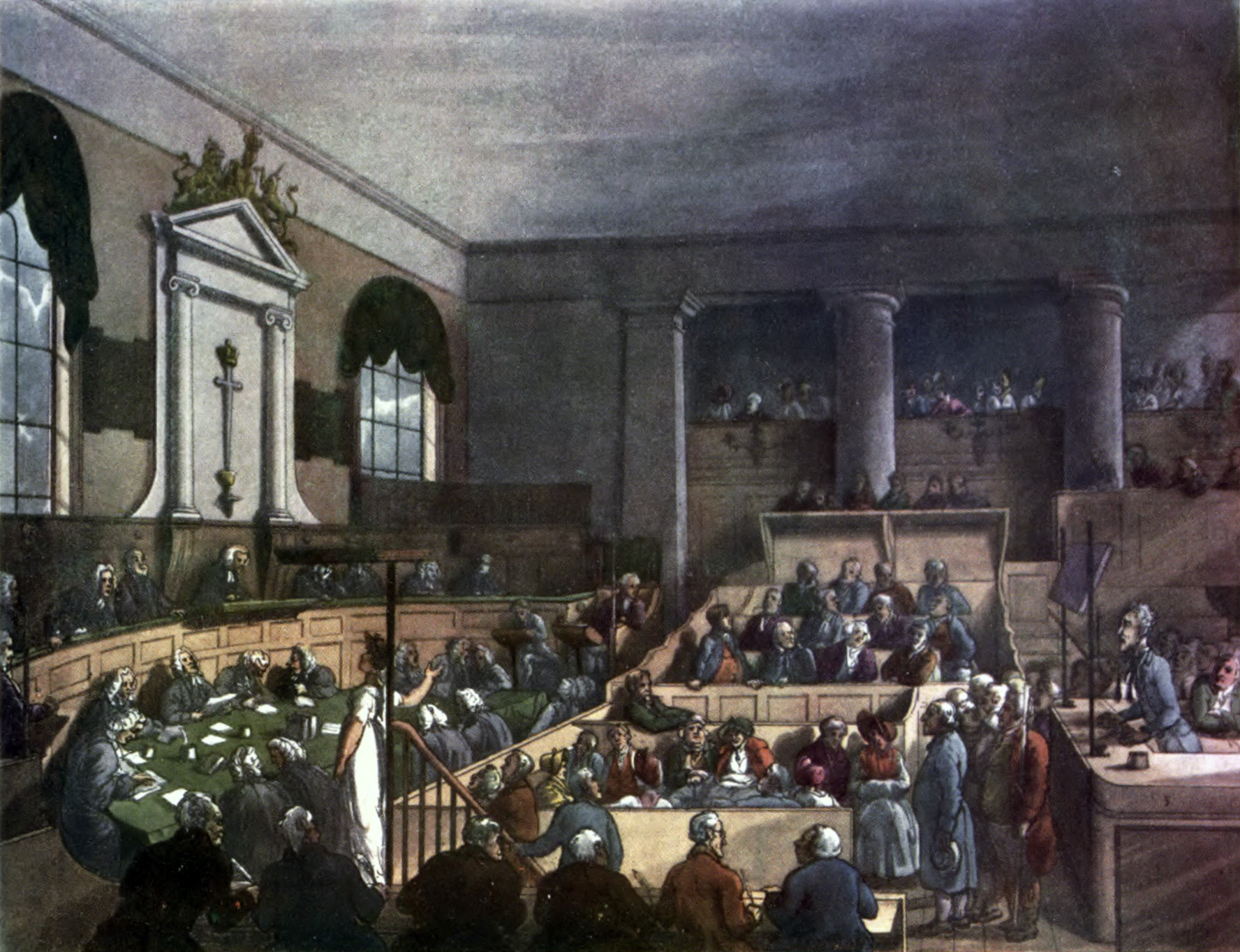
Illustration c. 1808 of a trial at the Old Bailey in London. Courvoisier was found guilty here in June 1840 and sentenced to death.

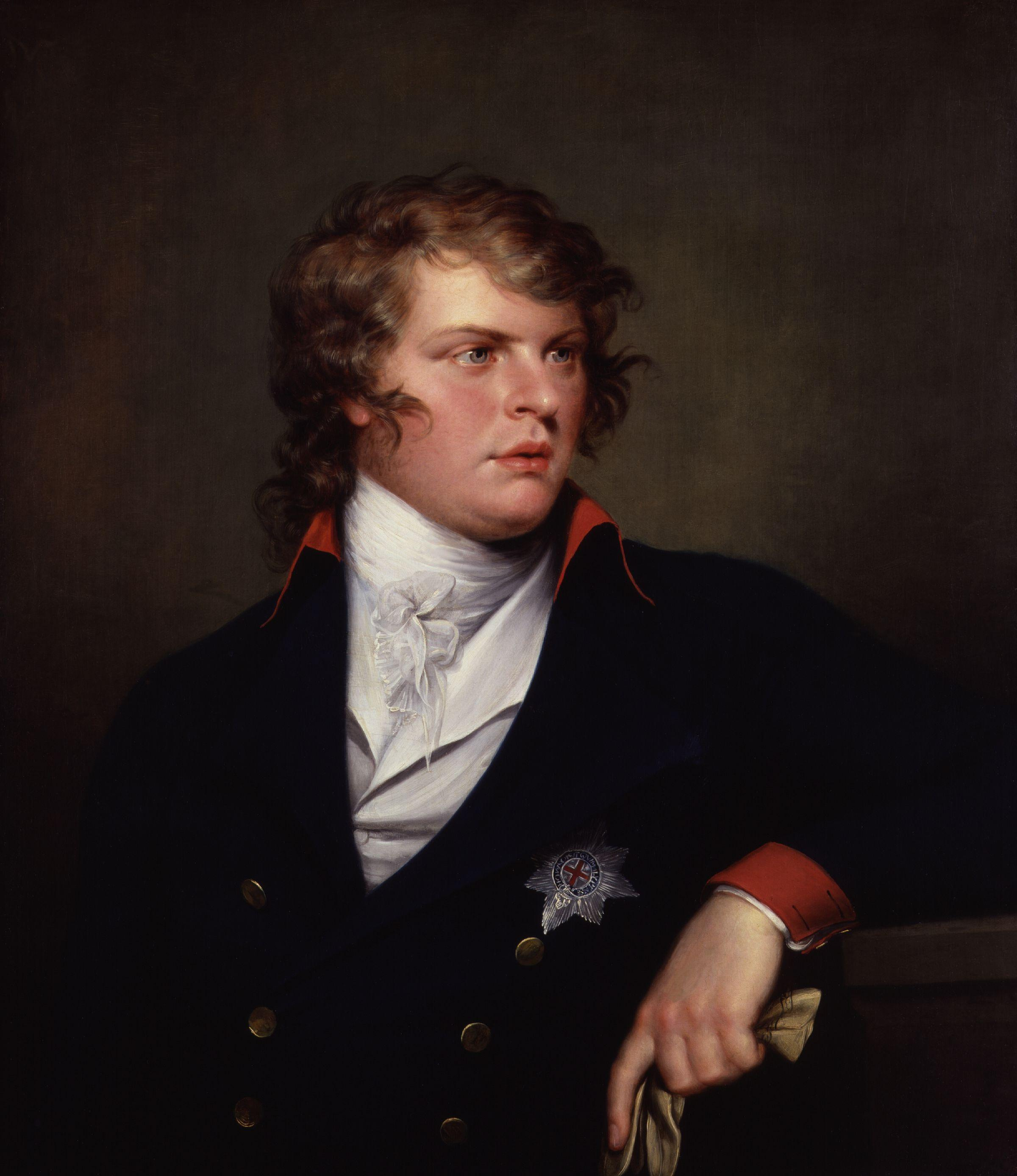
Among the many onlookers who attended Courvoisier's trial in June 1840 was Prince Augustus Frederick, Duke of Sussex.

Russell was a member of Brooks's, a gentlemen's club in St James's Street, London, and was in the habit of spending much of his day there. On the day before his murder he left Courvoisier with a number of tasks, one of which was to advise his coachman to collect him from Brooks's at five o'clock in his private carriage. Courvoisier, said to have been confused by the number of tasks he had been given, forgot to inform the coachman and Russell returned home by hired cab, showing 'some dissatisfaction at the neglect of his servant; but it does not appear that he exhibited any such anger as could well excite a feeling of hatred or ill-will' regarding the incident.

The evening continued 'in the usual way' with Russell taking his dinner, alone, at seven o'clock and then retiring to his library. Hannell had to leave and on her return Courvoiser was observed securely fastening the gate and kitchen door. When Courvoiser had to leave to obtain beer Hannell secured the gate and door at his return. At ten o'clock, Courvoiser had his dinner with the two female servants and the women retired to their rooms half an hour later. Courvoisier remained on duty to attend to Russell until he was ready to retire at half past twelve.

The following morning, at 6.30am, Sarah Mancer found the main rooms of the house in disarray, as if they had been ransacked by thieves. She alerted Hannell and Courvoisier and it was agreed they would check on Lord William. They found him in bed with his throat cut and his pillow soaked in blood. Mancer went for the Police and a doctor and, when they returned, found Courvoisier 'in a stupefied state' still in Russell's room. Courvoisier appeared to regain his senses and suggested Russell's son should be contacted before taking the Police downstairs where he pointed to marks on the pantry door and said 'It was here that they entered'.

The Police detained all three staff and, for two days, examined the house. Concealed in various places in the pantry, which was also Courvoisier's bedroom, they found various valuable items belonging to Russell. Another item, a gold locket belonging to Russell, was also found in Courvoisier's possession and, on 8 May, he was arrested for murder.

Courvoisier's trial began at the Old Bailey before Chief Justice Nicholas Conyngham Tindal and Justice Baron James Parke, and took three days. It was widely reported in the London newspapers and, among the many titled spectators, was Prince Augustus Frederick, Duke of Sussex, who was seated in a position normally reserved for the Lord Mayor of London. The defence benefited from the generosity of Sir George Beaumont, a longtime employer of Courvoisier's uncle, who donated £50 for the employment of a solicitor and barrister, while the prosecution was led by John Adolphus. Courvoisier pleaded not guilty when the indictment was read.

Adolphus began his cross-examination of witnesses, including Hannell and Mancer, by admitting to the court that it appeared that Courvoisier had no apparent motive to murder Russell, and that the evidence against him was circumstantial, but he also suggested that the accused, 'as a foreigner', may behave differently to an Englishman. That night, a new witness, Madame Charlotte Piolaire, came forward, to Police and, during cross examination the following day, she testified that Courvoiser had left a parcel with her prior to the murder and, when it was opened by Police, it was found to contain items belonging to Russell. It was later reported that after Madame Piolaine's evidence, Courvoiser summoned his defence counsel and said 'I have committed the murder' but added that he did not want to change his plea. Phillips addressed the court, on the third day, continuing to argue that the evidence against his client was circumstantial. The jury found Courvoiser guilty of murder, and Chief Justice Tindal gave a sentence of death by hanging, to take place on 6 July 1840.

The day after the sentence was passed Courvoiser made a confession, stating:

'His lordship was very cross with me and told me I must quit his service. As I was coming upstairs from the kitchen I thought it was all up with me; my character was gone, and I thought it was the only way I could cover my faults by murdering him. This was the first moment of any idea of the sort entering my head. I went into the dining-room and took a knife from the sideboard. I do not remember whether it was a carving-knife or not. I then went upstairs, I opened his bedroom door and heard him snoring in his sleep; there was a rushlight in his room burning at this time. I went near the bed by the side of the window, and then I murdered him. He just moved his arm a little; he never spoke a word.'

== Execution ==
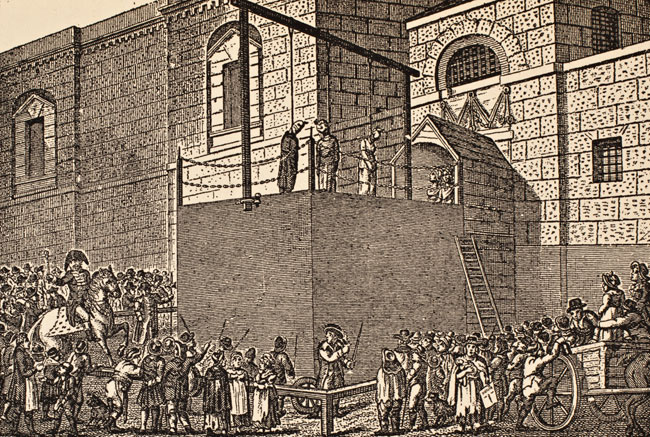
Engraving of a public hanging outside the Debtor's door of Newgate Prison. Courvoiser met this fate on 6 July 1840.

Courvoiser's confession was accompanied by a religious fervour and he spent most of his final days at Newgate Prison in prayer. His last appearance, the day before his death, was at a service in the prison chapel, where he stood before his own coffin, watched by the many spectators who had applied to attend. Returned to his cell, he was visited by the Swiss consul who gave him a letter from his mother in which she wrote that she forgave him, and he was permitted to write a short reply.

On the day of Courvoiser's death the usual protocols were followed with the scaffold erected outside the debtor's door of the prison ready for the execution time of 8am. At the appointed time, Courvoiser was led to the scaffold, a noose placed around his neck and a hood over his eyes, and he was hanged.

A crowd estimated at 40,000 people witnessed the execution, including British aristocrats, Members of Parliament, and 'distinguished Russian noblemen'. Elsewhere, watching separately in the crowd, were writers and death penalty opponents Charles Dickens and William Makepeace Thackeray. Both would later write about the events of the morning, with Thackeray, in his essay On going to see a man hanged, stating 'I feel myself shamed and degraded at the brutal curiosity that took me to that spot.'

At the end of January 2017, his plaster death mask was sold for £20,000 by Thomson Roddick auction house. The name of the buyer is unknown.
