= Hawkins baronets of Kelston (1778) =

Escutcheon of the Hawkins baronets of Kelston

The Hawkins baronetcy, of Kelston in the County of Somerset, was created in the Baronetage of Great Britain on 25 July 1778 for Cæsar Hawkins, Serjeant-Surgeon to George II and George III. The 3rd Baronet was High Sheriff of Somerset for 1807.

The baronetcy is currently marked vacant by the Official Roll.

== Hawkins baronets, of Kelston (1778) ==
- Sir Cæsar Hawkins, 1st Baronet (1711–1786)
- Sir Cæsar Hawkins, 2nd Baronet (c.1781–1793)
- Sir John Cæsar Hawkins, 3rd Baronet (1782–1861)
- Sir John Cæsar Hawkins, 4th Baronet (1837–1929)
- Sir John Scott Cæsar Hawkins, 5th Baronet (1875–1939)
- Sir Villiers Godfrey Cæsar Hawkins, 6th Baronet (1890–1955)
- Sir Humphry Villiers Cæsar Hawkins, 7th Baronet (1923–1993)
- Sir Howard Cæsar Hawkins, 8th Baronet (1956–1999)
- Sir Richard Cæsar Hawkins, 9th Baronet (1958–2026)
- Jonathan Cæsar Hawkins, presumed 10th Baronet (born 1992)

== Extended family ==
Cæsar Hawkins (1798–1884), son of the Rev. Edward Hawkins, younger son of the 1st Baronet, was a distinguished surgeon.

== Notes ==
Baronetage of Great Britain
Preceded by Eliot baronets	Hawkins baronets of Kelston; 25 July 1778	Succeeded by Heron baronets
