= Heron baronets of Newark upon Trent (1778) =

Escutcheon of the Heron baronets of Newark upon Trent

The Heron baronetcy, of Newark upon Trent, was created in the Baronetage of Great Britain on 25 August 1778 for Richard Heron, Chief Secretary for Ireland 1777–1780 and Member of the Parliament of Ireland for Lisburn. The grant had a special remainder, to his brother Thomas of Chilham Castle.

He was succeeded by his nephew, the 2nd Baronet, son of Thomas Heron, who was a Member of Parliament for Grimsby 1812–1818 and for Peterborough from 1819 to 1847. The baronetcy became extinct on his death in 1854.

== Heron baronets, of Newark upon Trent (1778) ==
- Sir Richard Heron, 1st Baronet (1726–1805)
- Sir Robert Heron, 2nd Baronet (1765–1854)

== Notes ==
Baronetage of Great Britain
| Preceded by Hawkins baronets | Heron baronets of Newark upon Trent; 25 August 1778 | Succeeded by Wombwell baronets |
