= Heron baronets =

Set index for Heron baronets

There have been two baronetcies created for descendants of the ancient 12th-century border family of Heron of Ford Castle, Northumberland. Both are extinct.

- Heron baronets of Chipchase (1662)
- Heron baronets of Newark upon Trent (1778)
