= John Peter Grant (MP) =

Scottish politician (1774–1848)

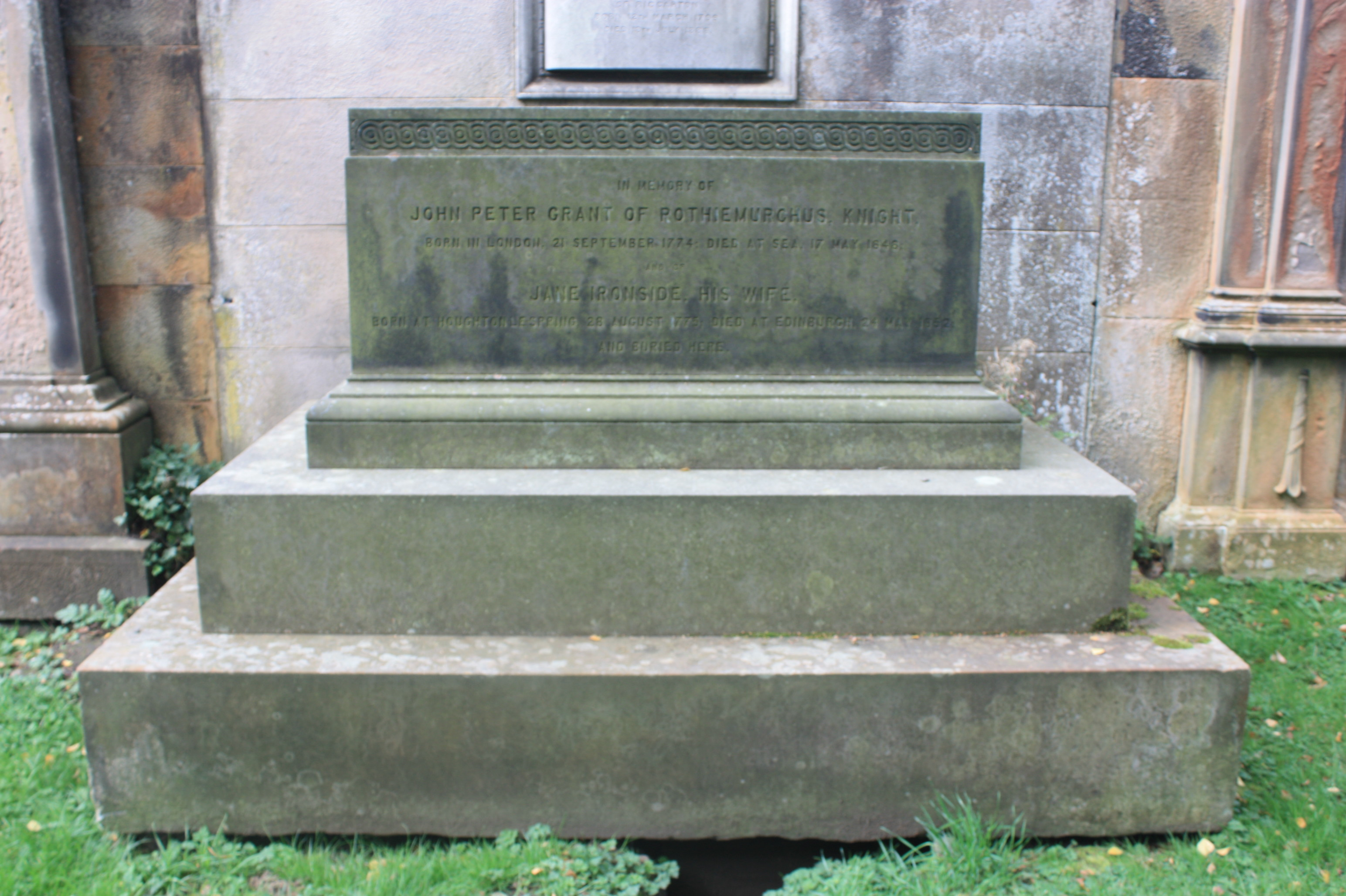
Sir John Peter Grant's grave, Dean Cemetery, Edinburgh

John Peter Grant (21 September 1774 – 17 May 1848) was a Scottish politician from Inverness-shire who sat in the House of Commons for English constituencies between 1812 and 1826.

== Life ==
John Peter Grant was born in 1774. Educated at Edinburgh High School and Edinburgh University, he was a Member of Parliament (MP for Great Grimsby from 1812 to 1818, then for Tavistock from 1819 to 1826.

Despite deriving a substantial income from the extraction of timber from his Rothiemrchus estate in Badenoch, his debts mounted and in 1827 bankruptcy obliged him to move with his family to British India, where he served as Puisne judge of Bombay until 1830, and of Bengal from 1833 to 1848. His children included Sir John Peter Grant the M.P. and Elizabeth Grant the diarist.

He died on board ship during a return journey to Britain, and was buried at sea.

His wife Jane Ironside Grant is buried against the original north wall of Dean Cemetery in Edinburgh; the gravestone is also a memorial to her husband.

Parliament of the United Kingdom
Preceded by John Henry Loft; William Ellice	Member of Parliament for Great Grimsby; 1812–1818; With: Sir Robert Heron, Bt	Succeeded by Charles Tennyson; John Nicholas Fazakerley
Preceded by Lord William Russell; Lord John Russell	Member of Parliament for Tavistock; 1819–1826; With: Lord John Russell to March 1820; John Nicholas Fazakerly March–May 1820; Viscount Ebrington From May 1820	Succeeded by Viscount Ebrington; Lord William Russell
