= Sir Robert Heron, 2nd Baronet =

British Whig politician

Sir Robert Heron, 2nd Baronet (27 November 1765 – 29 May 1854), was a British Whig politician. He sat in the House of Commons from 1812 to 1847, with a break in 1818–1819.

== Early life ==
He was born in Newark-on-Trent, Nottinghamshire, the son of Thomas Heron of Chilham Castle, Kent, Recorder of Newark, and educated at St John's College, Cambridge. He inherited his baronetcy and extensive estates in Lincolnshire from his uncle, Sir Richard Heron, 1st Baronet, on the latter's death in 1805.

== Parliament ==
He served as High Sheriff of Lincolnshire for 1809–1810 and was then elected at the 1812 general election as a member of parliament (MP) for Great Grimsby. He held the seat until the next general election, in 1818, when he did not stand again in Grimsby. He did however, stand in 1818, for election in Lincolnshire County, though unsuccessfully.

He returned to the Commons the following year, when he was elected at a by-election in November 1819 as an MP for Peterborough. He held that seat until the 1847 general election, when he did not stand again.

== Stubton Hall ==
Heron owned Stubton Hall, a large estate at Stubton (near Newark-on-Trent) on the border of Lincolnshire and Nottinghamshire. The estate had belonged to the Heron family from since 1789, and the 17th-century hall was extensively rebuilt in the early 19th century by Sir Robert. He had initially used it as a summer retreat, but after being elected to Parliament he decided to make Stubton his main home. The architect Jeffry Wyatt drew up plans for remodelling, which had to be revised after the building was found to be in a poorer condition than was thought, and the resulting works were a big drain on Heron's finances: in January 1814 he recorded in his diary that he had spent £7,000 just get the building "covered in".

He also kept a large menagerie, and successfully bred a range of exotic animals including llamas, alpacas. lemurs, porcupines, armadillos and kangaroos.

Sir Robert and his wife Amelia, daughter and coheir of Sir Horace Mann, 2nd Baronet; had no children, and thus the baronetcy became extinct on his death. The estate passed to George Nevile, a relation of Amelia, and then to Sir Ralph Wilmot, 6th Baronet, on whose death it was sold to Edmund Royds.

Stubton Hall was restored in 2009, and re-opened as a wedding venue.

Parliament of the United Kingdom
Preceded by William Ellice; Col. John Henry Loft	Member of Parliament for Great Grimsby; 1812–1818; With: John Peter Grant	Succeeded by Charles Tennyson; John Nicholas Fazakerley
Preceded by Hon. William Lamb; James Scarlett	Member of Parliament for Peterborough; 1819–1847; With: James Scarlett to August 1830; Viscount Milton Aug–Nov 1830; John Nicholas Fazakerley Nov 1830–1841; Hon. George Wentworth-FitzWilliam from 1841	Succeeded by Hon. William Cavendish; Hon. George Wentworth-FitzWilliam
Baronetage of Great Britain
Preceded by Richard Heron	Baronet of Newark; 1805–1854	Extinct
