= John Nicholas Fazakerley =

British Whig politician

John Nicholas Fazakerley (7 March 1787 – 16 July 1852) was a British Whig politician. He was Member of Parliament for Lincoln (1812–18), Great Grimsby (1818–20), Tavistock (1820), Lincoln again (1826–30) and City of Peterborough (1830–41).

== Career ==
He was elected at the 1812 general election as a member of parliament (MP) for Lincoln, and held the seat until the 1818 general election, when he was returned for Great Grimsby. He held that seat until the 1820 general election, when was returned for Tavistock, but he resigned his seat two months later, in May 1820, by taking the Chiltern Hundreds.

Fazakerley returned to the Commons after a six-year absence when he was returned at the 1826 general election as MP for Lincoln. He did not contest the seat at the 1830 election, but was returned at a by-election in 1830 as MP for the City of Peterborough. He sat for Peterborough until the 1841 election, when he retired from Parliament.

== Meeting with Napoleon ==
He met the Emperor of the French Napoleon with Lord John Russell on Elba in the winter of 1814.

Parliament of the United Kingdom
Preceded by Earl of Mexborough; Richard Ellison	Member of Parliament for Lincoln; 1812–1818; With: Sir Henry Sullivan; Coningsby Waldo-Sibthorpe	Succeeded by Ralph Bernal; Coningsby Waldo-Sibthorpe
Preceded by John Peter Grant; Sir Robert Heron, Bt	Member of Parliament for Great Grimsby; 1818–1820; With: Charles Tennyson	Succeeded by William Duncombe; Charles Tennyson
Preceded by Lord John Russell; John Peter Grant	Member of Parliament for Tavistock; March 1820–May 1820; With: John Peter Grant	Succeeded by Viscount Ebrington; John Peter Grant
Preceded by John Williams; Robert Percy Smith	Member of Parliament for Lincoln; 1826–1830; With: Colonel Sibthorp	Succeeded by Colonel Sibthorp; John Fardell
Preceded by Viscount Milton; Sir Robert Heron, Bt	Member of Parliament for Peterborough; 1830–1841; With: Sir Robert Heron, Bt	Succeeded by Hon. George Wentworth-FitzWilliam; Sir Robert Heron, Bt
