= Richard Heron =

Irish politician

Sir Richard Heron, 1st Baronet (1726 – 18 January 1805) was a politician in the Kingdom of Ireland.

He was the youngest son of Robert Heron of Newark-on-Trent, Nottinghamshire. He was admitted to Lincoln's Inn in 1748, made a Commissioner of Bankruptcy in 1751 and a Remembrancer in the Exchequer in 1754.

He sat in the Irish House of Commons as a Member of Parliament (MP) for Lisburn from 1777 to 1783, and served as Chief Secretary for Ireland from 1776 to 1780. He was sworn of the Privy Council of Ireland on 25 January 1777.

He was made a Baronet in 1778, of Newark upon Trent.

He died in 1805 at his home in London. He had married Jane, widow of Stephen Thompson, daughter and coheir of Abraham Hall. He had no children and thus the baronetcy and his estates in Lincolnshire passed to his nephew Sir Robert Heron, 2nd Baronet.

Parliament of Ireland
Preceded by Richard Jackson; FitzHerbert Richards	Member of Parliament for Lisburn; 1777–1783; With: FitzHerbert Richards	Succeeded by William Todd Jones; William Sharman
Political offices
Preceded by Sir John Blaquiere	Chief Secretary for Ireland; 1776–1780	Succeeded by William Eden
Baronetage of Great Britain
New creation	Baronet (of Newark upon Trent); 1778–1805	Succeeded by Robert Heron
