= Caesar Hawkins =

British surgeon

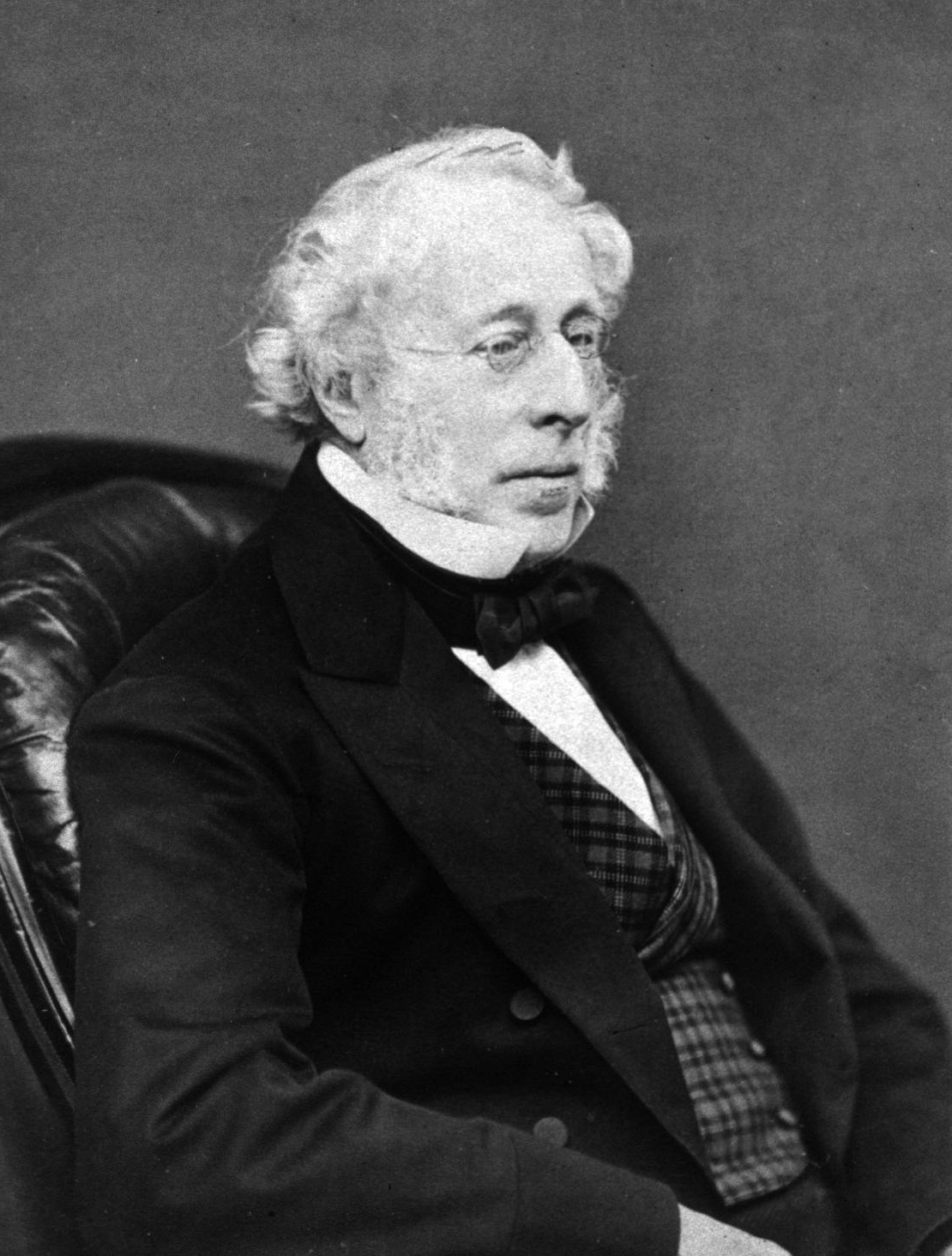
Caesar H. Hawkins

Caesar (or Cæsar) Henry Hawkins FRS (19 September 1798 – 20 July 1884) was a British surgeon.

== Life ==
He was the son of the Rev. E. Hawkins and grandson of Sir Cæsar Hawkins, 1st Baronet (1711–1786), Serjeant-Surgeon to George II and George III (see Hawkins baronets); and was brother to fellow physician Francis Hawkins and to Edward Hawkins (1789–1882), Provost of Oriel, Oxford. Hawkins was born at Bisley, Gloucestershire. He was educated at Christ's Hospital, and entered St George's Hospital, London, in 1818. He was surgeon to the hospital from 1829 to 1861, and in 1862 was made sergeant-surgeon to Queen Victoria. He was president of the Royal College of Surgeons in 1852 and again in 1861 and delivered the Hunterian oration in 1849. He was also President of the Royal Medical and Chirurgical Society as well as President of the Pathological Society of London in 1853.

His success in complex surgical cases gave him a great reputation. For long he was noted as the only surgeon who had succeeded in the operation of ovariotomy in a London hospital. This occurred in 1846, when anaesthetics were unknown. He did much to popularize colostomy. A successful operator, he nevertheless was attached to conservative surgery, and was always more anxious to teach his pupils how to save a limb than how to remove it.

== Works ==
He re-printed his contributions to the medical journals in two volumes, 1874, including papers on Tumours, Excision of the Ovarium, Hydrophobia and Snake-bites, Stricture of the Colon, and The Relative Claims of Sir Charles Bell and Magendie to the Discovery of the Functions of the Spinal Nerves.
