= James Prior (surgeon) =

Irish surgeon and writer

Sir James Prior (c.1790–1869) was an Irish surgeon and writer.

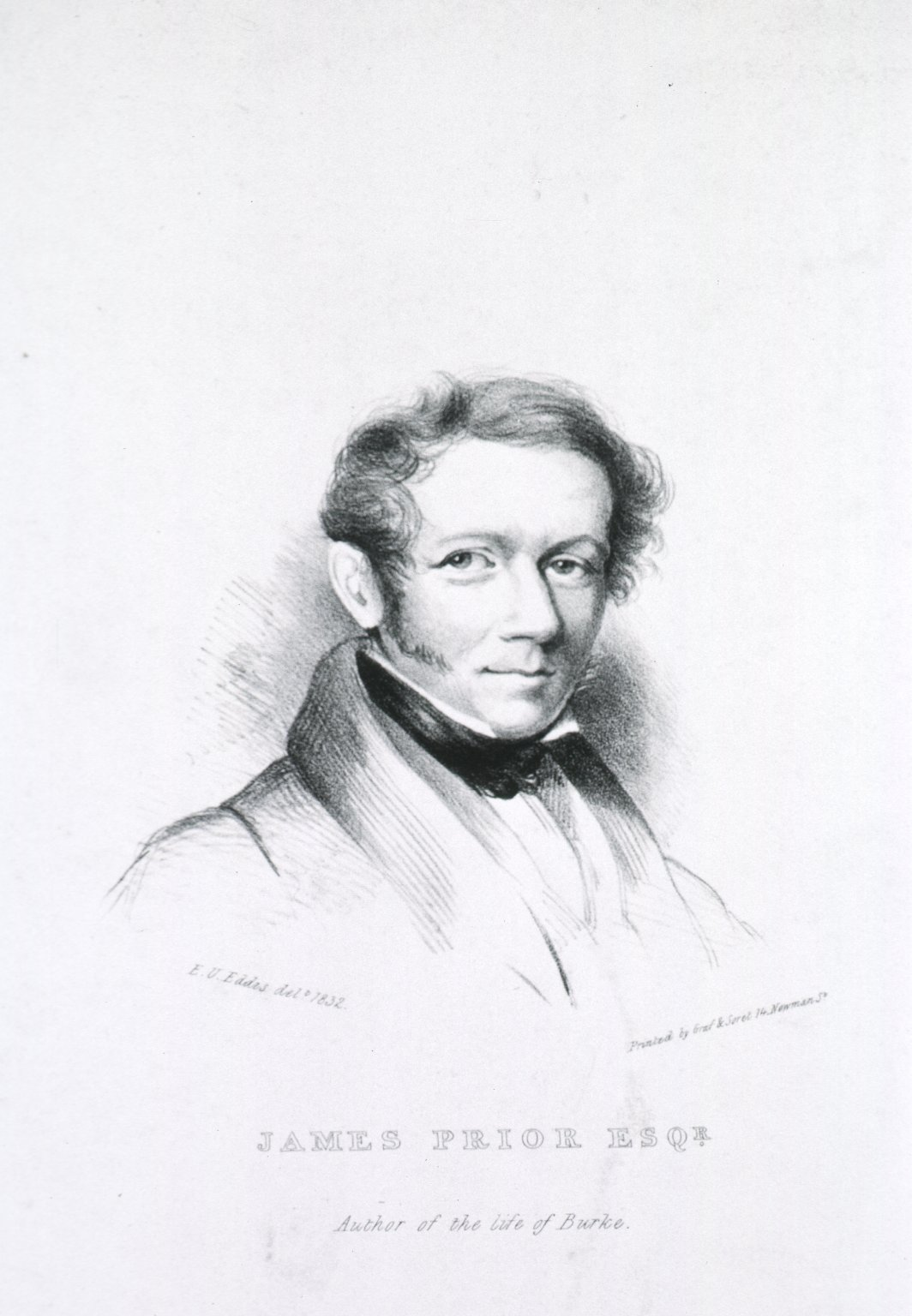
James Prior, from 1832 drawing

== Life ==
The son of Matthew Prior, he was born at Lisburn about 1790. He entered the Royal Navy as a surgeon, and sailed from Plymouth in the frigate HMS Nisus on 22 June 1810. His ship was stationed at Mauritius from November 1810 to April 1811, when he had charge of the wounded; and, after visiting the Seychelles Islands, Madras, Mauritius, Java (at the reduction of which by the British in September 1811 he was present), and Batavia, returned to the Cape of Good Hope. His next expedition, also in the Nisus, was to Table Bay (February 1812), St. Helena (January 1813), Rio de Janeiro (October 1813), and Pernambuco (December 1813).

Prior was present at the surrender of Heligoland, which was confirmed to the United Kingdom by the treaty of Kiel on 14 January 1814. In the same year he was ordered to accompany the first regiment of imperial Russian guards from Cherbourg to St. Petersburg, and in 1815 he was on the coast of La Vendée, and was present at the surrender of Napoleon on 15 July. He then became staff surgeon to the Chatham division of the Royal Marines, and to three of the royal yachts. His next appointment was that of assistant to the director-general of the medical department of the navy, and on 1 August 1843 he was created deputy-inspector of hospitals.

Prior was elected member of the Royal Irish Academy and Athenæum Club in 1830, and made a Fellow of the Society of Antiquaries of London on 25 November that year. He was knighted at St. James's Palace on 11 June 1858. For many years before his death he resided at Norfolk Crescent, Hyde Park, London. He died at Brighton on 14 November 1869.

== Works ==
Prior's major works were biographies of Edmund Burke and Oliver Goldsmith. The Memoir of the Life and Character of Edmund Burke appeared in 1824, and was reissued, enlarged to two volumes, in 1826. The third edition came out in 1839, the fourth in 1846, and, after it had been revised by the author, the memoir was included in 1854 in "Bohn's British Classics". His Life of Oliver Goldsmith, from a variety of original sources, was published in 1837 in two volumes; and in the same year he edited in four volumes the Miscellaneous Works of Goldsmith, including a variety of pieces now first collected.

When John Forster brought out in 1848 his Life and Adventures of Oliver Goldsmith, he was accused by Prior of wholesale plagiarism. The case was debated in the Literary Gazette, 3 June, 17 June, and 29 July 1848, and The Athenæum, 10 June 1848; the accusation was further rebutted by Forster in 1854 in the second edition of his work. Washington Irving, in his Life of Goldsmith (1849), admitted his obligations to Prior; but Prior's short tract Goldsmith's Statue denounced Irving for having stolen his materials.

Prior's other works were:

- Voyage in the Indian Seas in the Nisus frigate during 1810 and 1811, published by Sir Richard Phillips in 1820, and included in the first volume of a collection of New Voyages and Travels.
- Voyage along the Eastern Coast of Africa (1819), included in the second volume of Phillips's Voyages.
- The Remonstrance of a Tory to Sir Robert Peel, 1827, in which Prior attacked Peel's position on Catholic emancipation.
- The Country House and other Poems, 1846.
- Invitation to Malvern, a poem with introductory poetical epistle to Charles Phillips, 1851.
- Lines on reading Verses of Admiral Smyth, 1857.
- Llangothlen, a sketch (no place or date).
- Life of Edmond Malone, with Selections from his Manuscript Anecdotes, 1860.

== Family ==
Prior married, in 1817, Dorothea, widow of a Mr. E. James. She died at Oxford Terrace, Hyde Park, on 28 November 1841. In 1847 he married Carolina, widow of Charles H. Watson, who died on 14 December 1881, aged 85.

== Notes ==
Attribution

This article incorporates text from a publication now in the public domain: Lee, Sidney, ed. (1896). "Prior, James". Dictionary of National Biography. Vol. 46. London: Smith, Elder & Co.
