= Lord William Russell =

British aristocrat and politician who was murdered by his valet (1767–1840)

- Born: 20 August 1767
- Died: 5 May 1840 (aged 72)
- Cause of death: Murdered by François Benjamin Courvoisier
- Spouse: Lady Charlotte Anne Villiers (m. 1789; died 1808)
- Children: 7
- Parents: Francis Russell, Marquess of Tavistock (father); Lady Elizabeth Keppel (mother)

Lord William Russell (20 August 1767 – 5 May 1840) was a member of the British aristocratic Russell family and longtime Member of Parliament. He did little to attract public attention after the end of his political career until, in 1840, he was murdered in his sleep by his valet.

== Life ==
Russell was the posthumous child of Francis Russell, Marquess of Tavistock, eldest son of John Russell, 4th Duke of Bedford. He was the youngest brother of Francis Russell, 5th Duke of Bedford, and John Russell, 6th Duke of Bedford, and uncle of Francis Russell, 7th Duke of Bedford.

Russell married Lady Charlotte Villiers, eldest daughter of George Bussy Villiers, 4th Earl of Jersey, on 11 July 1789; they had seven children. Lady Charlotte died in 1808. As was mentioned in evidence at the trial of his murderer, Russell had a locket containing some of his wife's hair, which he valued greatly.

The Times, reporting on proceedings where Russell's eligibility to register as a voter in Middlesex and Surrey was challenged in 1836, included the information that he spent much time abroad, living in hotels when in England. However, by 1840 Lord William was residing in the London house where he was murdered.

== Political career ==
As with many members of the Russell family, notably his nephew the future Prime Minister Lord John Russell (who was Colonial Secretary at the time of the murder), Lord William was a Whig politician.

Russell represented the county of Surrey in the House of Commons from 1789 until he was defeated in the 1807 election. Russell held junior ministerial office in the Ministry of all the Talents, being appointed a Lord of the Admiralty in 1806 and retaining the post until the fall of the ministry in 1807.

Russell, taking advantage of the fact that different constituencies polled on different dates, remained in Parliament by being elected for the Russell family pocket borough of Tavistock. He represented that constituency from 1807 until he stood down in 1819, and again from 1826 until he retired from Parliament in 1831.

During a brief stay in Venice, Italy in 1821, Russell studied at the San Lazzaro degli Armeni.

Lord William continued to support the Whig Party after he left the legislature. The Times reported in 1837 that few Whigs supported the government at the Great Middlesex Meeting, "inasmuch as not a man of them, barring the young Lord who had taken the chair, and his aged uncle Lord William Russell, ever showed fight at all".

== Murder and investigation ==
Murder of Lord William Russell in The Chronicles of Newgate

On the morning of 6 May 1840, Russell's housemaid, Sarah Mancer, discovered the lower floors of the house in Norfolk Street (now called Dunraven Street) in disarray. Fearing that a robbery had taken place in the night, she went to the room of the Swiss valet, François Benjamin Courvoisier, and found him already dressed. Upon seeing the state of the house, he agreed that a robbery must have occurred; Courvoisier and Mancer then went to Russell's bedchamber, where Courvoisier immediately began to open the shutters, as he always did. Thus it was Mancer who first noticed that Russell was dead; his throat had been cut. The police were summoned; Courvoisier drew their attention to marks of violence upon the door to his pantry, asserting that this was where the robbers had entered the house.

A provincial doctor, Robert Blake Overton, wrote to Scotland Yard suggesting checking for fingerprints but the suggestion, though followed up, did not lead to routine use of fingerprinting by the police for another 50 years.

The police, however, came quickly to the conclusion that the "robbery" had been staged in order to draw suspicion away from some member of the household. Numerous small gold and silver articles, as well as a ten-pound banknote, were found to be missing; some of the articles were soon discovered wrapped in a parcel inside the house, which was curious – a thief would have carried them off straightaway rather than leave them behind. The discovery of several more gold articles, as well as the banknote, hidden in the wainscoting and in Courvoisier's pantry cemented their suspicion of the valet. Additionally, a screwdriver in his possession was found to match the marks on the pantry door as well as marks left by the forcing of the silverware drawer.

Courvoisier was put on trial, but the question was whether his guilt could be conclusively proven. His counsel, Charles Phillips, was doing well on the paucity of evidence, such as the lack of blood on Courvoisier's clothes, unusual in a cut-throat murder. Phillips was supposed by some to be hinting at the guilt of a maidservant in the house, when an inventory indicated that several further items of silverware were missing, and silver matching their description was located in a French hotel in Leicester Square. Samuel Warren defended Phillips against the charge he had ever imputed guilt to any woman in the house, in his 1855 book, The Mystery of Murder, and its Defence.

This report was conveyed to Courvoisier by his barrister, and he immediately confessed to both the thefts and the murder. Phillips asked his client if he now planned to change his plea from not guilty to guilty. Courvoisier insisted on maintaining the not guilty plea, and said he expected Phillips to continue the defence on that basis. The legal interest in the case arises from Phillips' approach to the judge for guidance. He was forcefully told he could not ask for such advice, so he continued the defence, knowing that his client was guilty. It led to considerable public criticism of Phillips after the trial, some papers saying he had tried to fix the blame on the maid, although the transcript shows he had specifically disclaimed making any such imputation during the trial. He did expose the fact that a policeman had planted a pair of bloody gloves in the defendant's things.

It emerged in Courvoisier's confession that Russell had discovered his silverware thefts and ordered Courvoisier to resign from the household. Rather than lose his position, Courvoisier decided to conceal the matter by murdering Russell. The lack of blood on Courvoisier's clothes was then explained; he had committed the crime while naked.

Courvoisier had reportedly read William Harrison Ainsworth's novel Jack Sheppard in the days leading up to the crime, and several news reports implied that the novel's glorification of criminal life had led him to commit the murder. However, this avenue was not pursued in Courvoisier's court defence.

Courvoisier was publicly hanged outside Newgate Prison on 6 July 1840. Charles Dickens was among the estimated crowd of 40,000 who attended. Also present was the novelist William Makepeace Thackeray, who subsequently wrote an anti-capital punishment essay, On Going to See a Man Hanged. He wrote, "I came away that morning with a disgust for murder, but it was for the murder I saw done ... I feel myself shamed and degraded at the brutal curiosity that took me to that spot." Soon afterwards the murder scene was portrayed in a peep-show at a travelling fair.

Parliament of Great Britain
Preceded by Hon. William Norton; Sir Joseph Mawbey, Bt	Member of Parliament for Surrey; 1789–1800; With: Sir Joseph Mawbey, Bt 1789–1790; Hon. William Clement Finch 1790–1794; Sir John Frederick, Bt 1795–1800	Succeeded by Parliament of the United Kingdom
Parliament of the United Kingdom
Preceded by Parliament of Great Britain	Member of Parliament for Surrey; 1801–1807; With: Sir John Frederick, Bt	Succeeded by Samuel Thornton; George Holme Sumner
Preceded by Hon. Richard Fitzpatrick; Lord Robert Spencer	Member of Parliament for Tavistock; 1807–1819; With: Hon. Richard Fitzpatrick 1807, 1812–1813; Viscount Howick 1807; George Ponsonby 1807–1812; Lord John Russell 1813–1817, 1818–1819; Lord Robert Spencer 1817–1818	Succeeded by Lord John Russell; John Peter Grant
Preceded by John Peter Grant; Viscount Ebrington	Member of Parliament for Tavistock; 1826–1831; With: Viscount Ebrington	Succeeded by John Heywood Hawkins; Francis Russell
