= Peter Martin (professor) =

American scholar of English literature

- Born: 1940 (age 85–86); Buenos Aires, Argentina
- Education: Principia College (1962), Syracuse University (1968)
- Occupations: Historian, biographer, English literature scholar
- Known for: English literature scholar

Peter Martin (born 1940) is an English literature scholar, biographer, and an 18th-century garden historian. He was educated and has taught in the United States. He lives in England and Spain.

== Biography ==
Martin has been a professor of English Literature at Miami University; the College of William & Mary; New England College in Arundel, West Sussex, England; and Principia College (1993–2002). For several years, he was Garden Historian for the Colonial Williamsburg Foundation. He was also a Visiting Scholar at the University of Cambridge, England.

He has written several books on historical and biographical topics, including Samuel Johnson: A Biography, A Life of James Boswell, and Edmond Malone: Shakespearean Scholar - a Literary Biography. His has also published about gardens and gardening in Williamsburg and Colonial Virginia, including British and American Gardens in the Eighteenth Century, The Gardening World of Alexander Pope and Pursuing Innocent Pleasures. He also authored the highly acclaimed The Dictionary Wars about American lexicography and A Dog Called Perth about a 21-year relationship with his beagle.

Martin was born and lived in Argentina until the age of ten. He is a 1962 graduate of the Principia College in Elsah, Illinois. He earned his PhD from Syracuse University. He spends his time between West Sussex, England and El Campello, Spain.

== Published works ==
- Martin, Peter, ed. (1984). British and American Gardens in the Eighteenth Century: Eighteen Illustrated Essays. University of Virginia Press. ISBN 978-0-87935-105-2.
- Martin, Peter (1984). Pursuing Innocent Pleasures: The Gardening World of Alexander Pope. Archon Books. ISBN 978-0-208-02011-6.
- Martin, Peter (1991). The Pleasure Gardens of Virginia: From Jamestown to Jefferson. Princeton: Princeton University Press. ISBN 978-0-8139-2053-5.
- Martin, Peter (1995). Edmond Malone, Shakespearean Scholar: A Literary Biography. Cambridge University Press. ISBN 978-0-521-61982-0.
- Martin, Peter (1999). A Life of James Boswell. London: Weidenfeld & Nicolson. ISBN 978-0-297-81809-0.
- Martin, Peter (2001). A Dog Called Perth: The True Story of a Beagle. Orion Books. ISBN 978-1-55970-652-0.
- Martin, Peter, ed. (2003). The Essential Boswell: Selections from the Writings of James Boswell. Weidenfeld & Nicolson. ISBN 978-0-297-60718-2.
- Martin, Peter (2008). Samuel Johnson: A Biography. London: Weidenfeld & Nicolson. ISBN 978-0-297-60719-9.
- Martin, Peter (2009). Samuel Johnson: Selected Writings. Harvard University Press. ISBN 978-0-674-03585-0.
- Martin, Peter (2019). The Dictionary Wars: The American Fight over the English Language. Princeton University Press. ISBN 978-0-691-18891-1.
