= Charles Phillips (barrister) =

Irish barrister and writer

Charles Phillips (1787?–1859) was an Irish barrister and writer.

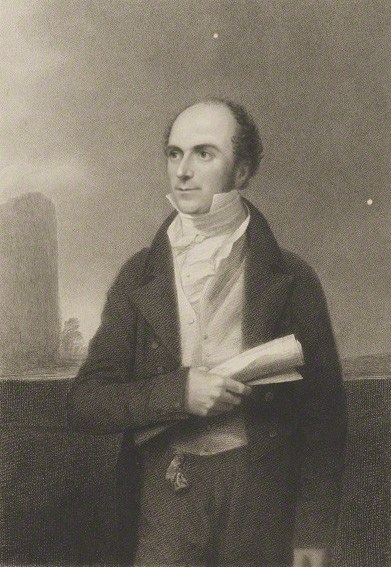
Charles Phillips, 1821 engraving

== Life ==
Phillips was born at Sligo about 1787, was son of William Phillips, a councillor of the town, who was connected in some way with Oliver Goldsmith's family, and died in 1800. After education in Sligo from the Rev. James Armstrong, he was sent in 1802 to Trinity College Dublin, at age 15, and in 1806 graduated B.A. The following year he entered the Middle Temple in London, and was called to the Irish Bar in 1812. While in London he started to write. He joined the Connaught circuit, and made a reputation by his florid oratory, which, though disliked by colleagues, was effective with juries. He was employed in most of the "crim. con." cases of the period, and some of his extravagant speeches were published in separate form.

Though a Protestant, Phillips took a part in the agitation for Roman Catholic emancipation. In 1813 he was presented with a national testimonial, and was publicly thanked by the Catholic Board. Daniel O'Connell eulogised him warmly, and Phillips in return was fulsome.

In 1821 Phillips was called to the English Bar, where his fame as a pleader had preceded him. In a comparatively short time he was leader of the Old Bailey bar. He was reported to have declined a silk gown and a judicial appointment in Calcutta, but in 1842 Lord Brougham appointed him commissioner of the bankruptcy court of Liverpool. In 1846 he obtained the post of commissioner of the insolvent debtors' court of London.

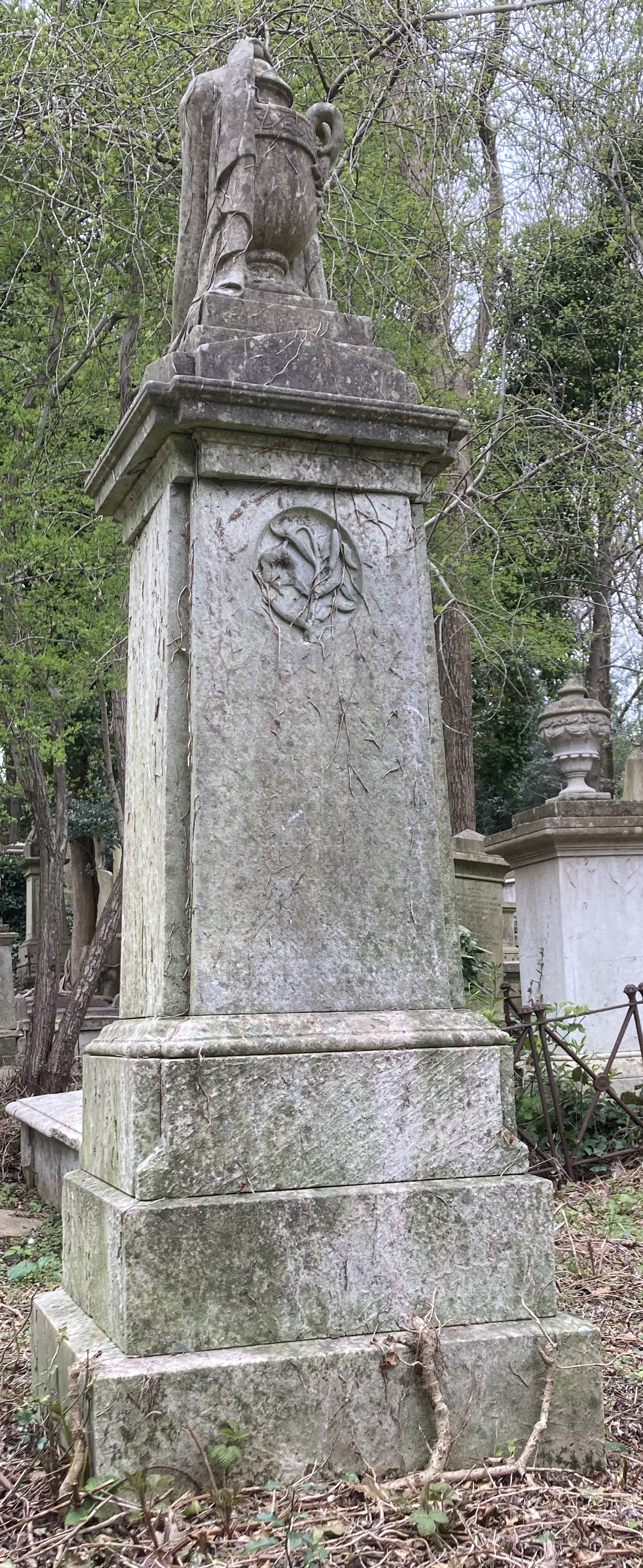
Grave of Charles Phillips in Highgate Cemetery

Phillips died in Golden Square, London, on 1 February 1859, aged 70, and was buried in Highgate Cemetery.

== Reputation ==
Published speeches by Phillips contain passages of fervent oratory, but overstatement was habitual to him. Brougham professed admiration, but called his speeches "horticultural". Christopher North faulted him, but thought he was worth a dozen of Richard Lalor Sheil. Sir James Mackintosh declared, on the other hand, that his style was "pitiful to the last degree", suggesting he should be driven from the bar.

Phillips was nicknamed "Counsellor O'Garnish" and his conduct of the defence of Courvoisier, a valet charged with the murder of his master Lord William Russell, in 1840, damaged his reputation. His client confessed once the case was being heard: Phillips sought counsel and was told to proceed. Though aware of his client's guilt, he continued to represent that he was innocent, and, it was thought by some, sought to inculpate another.

His "Character of Napoleon Bonaparte" is a masterpiece of invective directed against the French Emperor, published on his fall. The satire has the form of an elegy of praise for the subject

Curran and his Contemporaries (1818) showed Phillips's writing to advantage. His essay on capital punishment was adopted by the Quakers since it represented their philosophy.
