= Heron baronets of Chipchase (1662) =

Escutcheon of the Heron baronets of Chipchase

The Heron baronetcy of Chipchase was created on 20 November 1662 in the Baronetage of England by Charles II for Cuthbert Heron of Chipchase Castle, Northumberland, a supporter of the King's father Charles I, and High Sheriff of Northumberland that year.

The 6th Baronet, whose father changed his name upon marriage into the Myddleton family, was the nephew of the 2nd and 3rd Baronets. The baronetcy became extinct on his death in 1801.

== Heron baronets, of Chipchase (1662) ==
- Sir Cuthbert Heron, 1st Baronet (c. 1618–1688)
- Sir John Heron, 2nd Baronet (1654–1693)
- Sir Charles Heron, 3rd Baronet (died 1704)
- Sir Henry Heron, 4th Baronet (1696–1749)
- Sir Charles Heron, 5th Baronet (1748–1749)
- Sir Thomas Myddleton, 6th Baronet (1723–1801)
