= Dunraven Street =

Street in Mayfair, London

Coordinates: 51.5120°N 0.1570°W

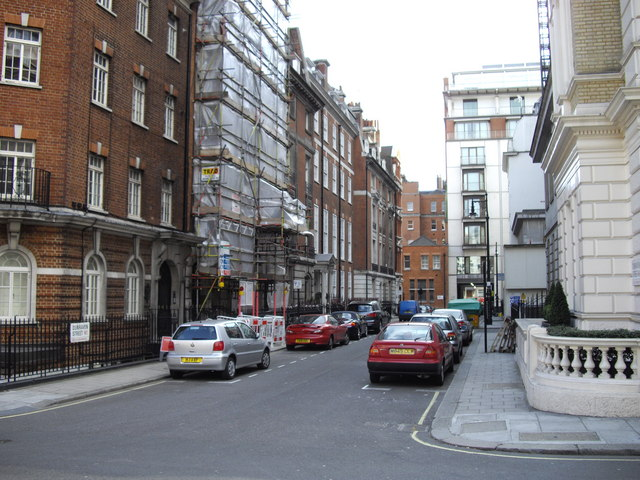
Dunraven Street

Dunraven Street is a street in London's Mayfair district. It was laid out in the 1750s as Norfolk Street, and in the 19th century was sometimes known as New Norfolk Street. In 1939, it was renamed Dunraven Street by London County Council, after the fourth Earl of Dunraven and Mount-Earl, a former resident of the street, who had been a member of the LCC.

Dunraven Street runs north to south from North Row to Wood's Mews, crossing Green Street.

== Residents ==
Notable occupants of houses on the east side include:

- Captain (later First Sea Lord and Admiral of the Fleet) John Fisher, 1st Baron Fisher, at No. 16 (site of the present No. 18) from 1887 to 1891. Lillie Langtry lived at No. 17 (site of the present No. 19) from 1877 to 1880. James McNeill Whistler assisted in the decoration of the house for her and provided the drawing-room with a painted ceiling.
- The Dowager Duchess of Beaufort, widow of 4th Duke, 1760–3.
- Colonel Oliver De Lancey, later general and MP, 1787–90.
- Col. James Moncrieff, military engineer, 1791–3.
- Sir Lucas Pepys, physician to George III, 1816–21.
- Sir John Carr, barrister and writer on travel, 1812–32.
- Sir Howard Elphinstone, 1st Baronet, commander royal engineers in the Peninsular War, 1821–46.
- Sir Murray Maxwell, naval capt., 1827–31.
- George Capel-Coningsby, 5th Earl of Essex, 1825–8.
- Lord William Russell, brother of 6th Duke of Bedford, murdered there by his valet, 1839–40.
- 4th Baron de Blaquiere, 1859–64.
- Sir Edward Watkin, 1st Baronet, MP, railway promoter, 1864–6. Adm.
- Sir Cyprian Bridge, 1893–6.
- George Thomas Kenyon, MP, 1894–8.
- James St Clair-Erskine, 5th Earl of Rosslyn, a professional actor under the name of James Erskine, 1906–7.
- P. G. Wodehouse lived at the Grade II listed 17 Dunraven Street between 1927 and 1934. In 1988, a blue plaque was unveiled here by the Queen Mother.
- Alexander McQueen (1969–2010), the fashion designer, purchased a flat at 17 Dunraven Street and applied for planning permission for a rooftop terrace. The work was completed by a new owner.
