= Sir Cæsar Hawkins, 1st Baronet =

English surgeon (1711–1786)

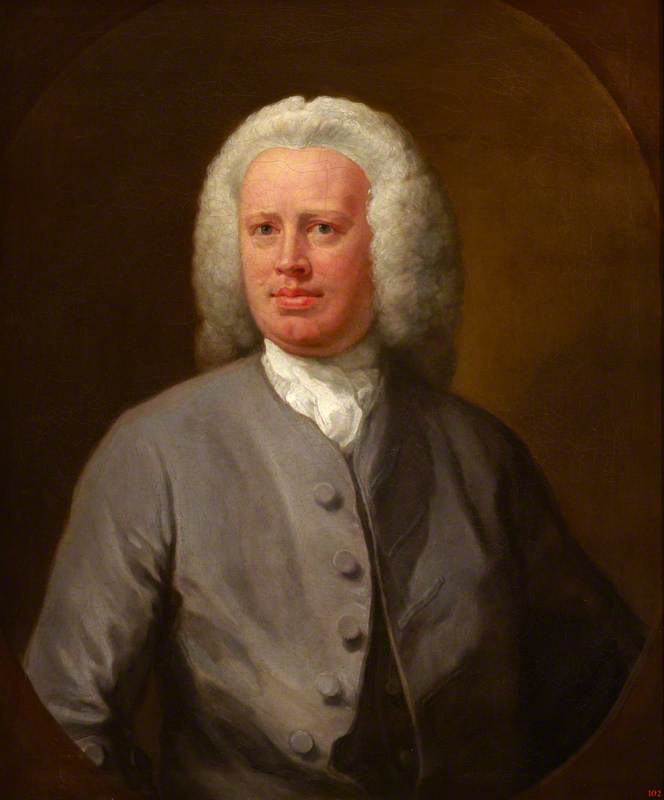
Portrait by William Hogarth.

Sir Caesar Hawkins, 1st Baronet (1711–1786) was a surgeon and baronet.

Hawkins was born in Kelston on 10 January 1711. He was a surgeon in St. George's Hospital from 1736 to 1774. He was a sergeant-surgeon to George II and George III of Great Britain and Ireland. He was created the first of the Hawkins baronets in 1778. He invented the cutting gorget.
