= Hawkins baronets =

Set index for Hawkins baronets

There have been two baronetcies created for persons with the surname Hawkins, both in the Baronetage of Great Britain. As of 2026 one creation is extant.

- Hawkins baronets of Kelston (1778)
- Hawkins baronets of Trewithen (1791): see Sir Christopher Hawkins, 1st Baronet (1758–1829)
