= Luckock =

Luckock is a surname. Notable people with the surname include:

- Herbert Mortimer Luckock (1833–1909), British Anglican priest
- Russell Mortimer Luckock (1877–1950), British Army colonel
- Rae Luckock (1893–1972), Canadian feminist, social justice activist and peace activist
