= HMS Stag (1794) =

Frigate of the Royal Navy

History

Great Britain
- Name: HMS Stag
- Ordered: 9 December 1790
- Builder: Thomas Pollard
- Laid down: March 1792
- Launched: 28 June 1794
- Fate: Wrecked

General characteristics
- Class & type: fifth-rate frigate
- Propulsion: Sails
- Armament: Gundeck: 26 × 18-pounder guns; QD: 4 × 6-pounder guns + 4 × 32-pounder carronades; Fc: 2 × 6-pounder guns + 2 × 32-pounder carronades

HMS Stag was a 32-gun fifth-rate frigate built for the Royal Navy. She was ordered in 1790 and work began in March 1792 at Chatham Dockyard. Completed in August 1794, Stag spent much of her service in home waters, where she worked to protect British shipping from French privateers. In an action on 22 August 1795, Stag engaged, and forced the surrender of, the Dutch frigate Alliante, and took part in the chase that ended with the capture of Bonne Citoyenne by HMS Phaeton on 10 March 1796.

In March 1800, Stag joined John Borlase Warren's squadron and took part in the unsuccessful Ferrol Expedition that August. At the end of the month, she was in a detachment under Samuel Hood that captured an 18-gun French privateer, Gueppe, in a cutting-out expedition in the Narrows of Redondela. On 6 September Stag was in Vigo bay where she was caught in a violent storm and driven ashore. Her crew and provisions were removed and she was set on fire the following day.

== Construction and armament ==
HMS Stag was a 32-gun, Royal Navy frigate of the Pallas class. Designed by John Henslow, she was ordered by the Admiralty on 9 December 1790 and her keel, of 113 feet 6 1/8 inches (34.6 m) was laid down in March 1792 at Chatham Dockyard. The original shipwright, John Nelson, died a year later and was replaced by Thomas Pollard. The cost of construction and first fitting was £21,397.0.0.

As built, Stag was 135 feet 11 1/4 inches (41.4 m) along the gun deck, had a beam of 36 feet 2 3/4 inches (11.0 m) and a depth in the hold of 12 feet 5 3/4 inches (3.8 m). She was 79246/94 tons burthen and drew between 9 ft 5 in (2.87 m) and 14 ft (4.3 m).

As a fifth-rate frigate, Stag was designed to carry a main battery of twenty-six 18-pounder (8.2 kg) guns on the upper deck with a secondary armament of four 6-pounder (2.7 kg) guns and four 32-pounder (15 kg) carronades on the quarterdeck and two 6-pounder (2.7 kg) guns and two 32-pounder (15 kg) carronades on the forecastle. Initially intended for a crew of 257, this was reduced to 254 from 1796.

== Career ==
Stag was launched on 28 June 1794, and commissioned by Captain Joseph Yorke in July. Following her fitting out, completed on 16 August, she served on the Irish Station and then the Channel. In August 1795, she captured the Dutch frigate Alliante in the North Sea.

=== Action of 22 August 1795 ===
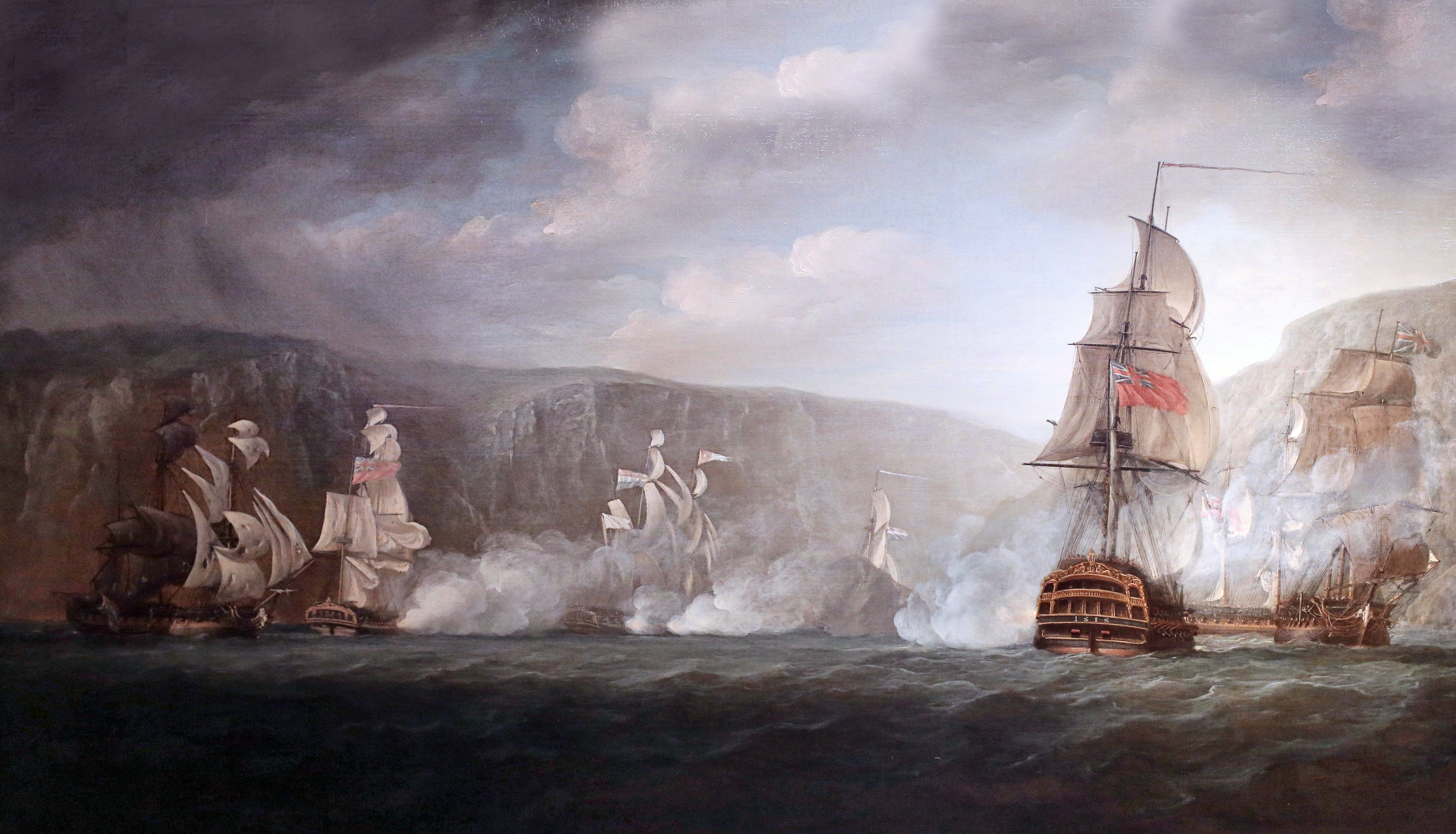
The Action of 22 August 1795 by Nicholas Pocock

On 12 August, Stag joined a small squadron comprising HMS Isis, 50 guns, HMS Reunion, 36 guns, and Vestal. On the 22nd, the squadron was cruising off the coast of Norway when at around 13:00, it spotted two ships and a cutter to windward and heading towards shore on a larboard tack. These ships proved to be the 36-gun frigates, Alliantie and Argo, and the 16-gun cutter, Vlugheld. A favourable wind change allowed Stag to overhaul the rear most ship, Alliantie, and bring her to action at about 16:15 while the remaining British ships engaged in a running battle with Argo and Vlugheld. After an hour's fighting, Stag managed to force the surrender of her larger opponent but Argo, despite suffering much damage, and Vlugheld escaped into port at 17:30. The engagement left Stag with four men killed and 13 wounded.

A prize crew under Stag's first lieutenant, Patrick Tonyn, took Alliantie to The Nore. She was subsequently purchased by the Admiralty and entered the Royal Navy as the frigate, HMS Alliance. Stag's share of the prize money for the ship and stores was £1,741.04.07d.

=== Capture of Bonne Citoyenne ===
Early in 1796, Stag was cruising with HMS Romney, HMS Phaeton and HMS Latona, and shared in the prize money for the recapture of a British merchant vessel on 25 February, and the capture of the 20-gun naval corvette, Bonne Citoyenne on 10 March.

Bonne Citoyenne was part of a French force bound for Mauritius. Badly damaged and separated from the others by a storm in the Bay of Biscay, she was chased by the British frigate squadron and eventually overhauled by Phaeton to which she surrendered to after a few shots.

=== Fight against privateering ===
On 12 February 1797, Stag captured three privateers and retook a captured British merchant vessel, Swallow. While off the Isles of Scilly on 21 February 1797, Stag captured the 14-gun brig, Appocrate and destroyed the cutter Hirondelle. (Note: Appocrate was a privateer brig from an unknown homeport, operating in the Caribbean in early 1797 with 65 men and 14 guns. After her capture, Appocrate was renamed Express, and sailed out of Dartmouth. The French privateer Trompeur captured her in early September 1797. She was recommissioned as a privateer in Saint-Domingue. HMS Pelican captured her on 17 September.) The following day, she recaptured the British merchantman, Sarah and arrived at Spithead on 2 March. Stag took more privateers and their prizes in September. At the end of the month, she destroyed a 4-gun French lugger near Plymouth. On 7 October, while in the company of HMS Phaeton and HMS Unite, she captured Decouverte, a French vessel of 18 guns, recaptured a Portuguese brig on 11 October and a British vessel a few days later. She fought privateers on her station for a further two years, including the a 20-gun Hirondelle, with Phaeton and HMS Ambuscade, on 20 November 1798 and a 10-gun vessel, Ressource, with Phaeton in December. Stag was again with Phaeton on 24 November, when they captured the French privateer, Resolu, a brig of 18 guns. Resolu was travelling with two prizes, General Wolfe from Poole and an American sloop which had been on its way from Boston, Massachusetts to Hamburg. Stag sailed off after the latter and eventually recaptured her.

On the night of 26 December, Stag was anchored in Cawsand Bay when she was visited by four customs officers, one of whom appeared to be seriously injured but on closer inspection by the ship's surgeon was revealed to be dead. Acting on information they had received, the revenue men had taken a boat out to Penlee Point where they discovered a large sloop and several smaller vessels. On being challenged, the smugglers exchanged fire with the revenue men before sailing off.

On 9 October the following year, she was in a squadron of six vessels that took the Spanish brig, Nostra Senora de la Solidad, then, on 16 October, she and HMS Cambrian captured a Spanish schooner. Her last recorded action against privateers in the Channel, occurred on 19 of that month, when, with Cambrian, she captured the 10-gun, Heureux. The two British frigates were off the entrance to the Garonne when they spotted and chased two enemy vessels. Stag captured Heureux while Cambrian sailed after the second, a privateer of 26 guns, which eventually escaped.

== Later service and fate ==
In March 1800, Stag came under the command of Captain Robert Winthrop. Part of John Borlase Warren's squadron, she took part in Ferrol Expedition that August.

At the end of the month, Stag was in a detachment under Samuel Hood that captured a French privateer, Gueppe, (Note: Also recorded as Guippe.) in a cutting-out expedition. Gueppe, a flush-deck ship of 300 tons and carrying 18 guns, was initially in the harbour at Vigo but, when the British force entered the bay on 29 August, was moved to near the Narrows of Redondela where she anchored below a shore battery. Hood selected two boats from Stag, HMS Amethyst, HMS Amelia, HMS Brilliant, and HMS Cynthia, four boats from HMS Courageaux, with additional boats from Renown, London, and Impetueux to take part in the action. The boats left at 21:00 and arrived alongside their quarry at 00:40 the following morning. Despite fierce resistance, Gueppe was taken within 15 minutes of boarding, after having 25 of her crew killed and forty wounded.

On 6 September Stag was at anchor in Vigo Bay in southern Spain where she was caught in a violent storm and driven ashore. Attempts to lighten and refloat her proved unsuccessful. On the following morning her crew and provisions were removed and the ship was set on fire and destroyed.

== Prizes ==
Vessels captured or destroyed for which Stag's crew received full or partial credit
Date	Ship	Nationality	Type	Fate	Ref.
22 August 1795	Alliantie	Dutch	Frigate (36 guns)	Captured	
25 February 1796	Betsey	British	Not recorded	Recaptured	
10 March 1796	Bonne Citoyenne	French	Corvette (20 guns)	Captured	
10 February 1797	Atlantic	American	Not recorded	Recaptured (Note: On 10 February, the 32-gun frigate, HMS Triton, captured Recovery, a 14-gun French privateer cutter, a few days out of Le Havre. She had captured an English smuggler and an American ship bound for Bombay. The latter, Atlantic, was recaptured a few hours later by Stag.)	
12 February 1797	Swallow	British	Merchant vessel	Recaptured	
12 February 1797	Recovery	French	Privateer	Captured	
12 February 1797	Difficile	French	Privateer	Captured	
12 February 1797	Jeune Emilie	French	Privateer	Captured	
21 February 1797	Appocrate	French	Brig (14 guns)	Captured	
21 February 1797	Hirondelle	French	Cutter (6 guns)	Destroyed	
22 February 1797	Sarah	British	Merchant vessel	Recaptured	
16 September 1797	Chasseur	French	Privateer	Captured	
18 September 1797	Brunette	French	Privateer	Captured	
24 September 1797	Noord Stern	British	Not recorded	Salvaged	
24 September 1797	Indien	French	Privateer	Captured	
24 September 1797	Adamant	British	Not recorded	Recaptured	
30 September 1797	Cocyte	French	Lugger, privateer (4 guns)	Destroyed	
3 October 1797	Arcade	British	Not recorded	Recaptured	
7 October 1797	Decouverte	French	Privateer (18 guns)	Captured	
11 October 1797 (Note: Some sources record the date of capture as 3 October.)	Venus et Cupido	Portuguese	Brig	Salvaged (Note: Recaptured with assistance from Phaeton and HMS Pique.)	
20 October 1797	Recovery	British	Not recorded	Recaptured	
2 June 1798	Speculation	Not recorded	Not recorded	Captured	
23 June 1798	Jonge Marcus	Dutch	Not recorded	Captured	
23 August 1798	Francoise	French	Chasse Maree	Captured	
17 November 1798	San Souci	French	Privateer	Captured	
20 November 1798	Hirondelle	French	Privateer (20 guns)	Captured	
24 November 1798	Fame	British	Not recorded	Salvaged	
24 November 1798	Resolu	French	Privateer (18 guns)	Captured	
6 December 1798	Resource	French	Privateer (10 guns)	Captured (Note: Resource was a 10-gun brig with a crew of 66 men. She was two days out of La Rochelle, heading for the African coast, when she ran into Stag and Phaeton.)	
13 December 1798	Faucon	French	Not recorded	Captured	
11 April 1799	Nymph	American	Not recorded	Recaptured	
8 October 1799	Diederick	Not recorded	Not recorded	Captured	
9 October 1799	Nostra Senora de la Solidad	Spanish	Brig	Captured	
16 October 1799	Amiable Marie de la Paz	Spanish	Schooner	Captured	
19 October 1799	Heureux	French	Privateer (10 guns)	Captured	
5 November 1799	James	British	Not recorded	Recaptured	
6 January 1800	Ursule	French	Brig	Captured	
26 June 1800	Lancaster	British	Not recorded	Recaptured	
30 August 1800	Gueppe	French	Privateer (18 guns)	Captured	
