= William Cuming (Royal Navy officer) =

Officer in the Royal Navy during the American and French revolutionary wars

Rear-Admiral William Cuming CB
- Born: c. 1760; Totnes, Devon, England
- Died: 1824 (aged 63–64)
- Allegiance: Kingdom of Great Britain; United Kingdom
- Branch: Royal Navy
- Rank: Rear-Admiral
- Conflicts: Battle of Copenhagen (1801); Battle of Cape Finisterre (1805)
- Awards: Companion of The Most Honourable Order of the Bath

William Cuming (c. 1760–1824) was an officer in the Royal Navy who served during the American and French Revolutionary Wars. He was the captain of HMS Russell at the Battle of Copenhagen in 1801, where his men captured the Danish ship of the line Prøvesteenen. In 1805, as flag captain aboard HMS Prince of Wales, he returned to England for Robert Calder's court martial, following perceived inaction at the Battle of Cape Finisterre. Cuming, therefore, missed the Battle of Trafalgar.

== Early life and career ==
William Cuming was born in 1760 to John and Elizabeth Cuming of Totnes. He remained in the county of Devon until 1773 when he joined the Royal Navy as a midshipman. Passing his lieutenant's examination in 1779, Cuming was made a Commander in 1795, and in this capacity he was appointed to HMS Alliance in 1796. Alliance was serving as a storeship in the Mediterranean, where Cuming came to the attention of the Admiral of the fleet, John Jervis. On 13 October 1797, Jervis promoted Cuming to Post-captain aboard the flagship, HMS Victory.

== Copenhagen and the Baltic ==
In March 1801, Cuming was in command of HMS Russell, part of the fleet under Admiral Hyde Parker sent to break up the League of Armed Neutrality. Because of the shoal waters around Copenhagen, Parker's larger ships were unable to get close enough to engage the anchored Danish fleet, but Russell was considered suitable and joined Horatio Nelson's squadron at the Battle of Copenhagen on 2 April. Cuming's ship, however, did not reach its assigned position in the battle, going aground almost immediately as it approached the southern end of the enemy line. Three hours later, Russell was flying a flag of distress but continued to fire upon the rearmost enemy ship, Prøvesteenen. When Prøvesteenen surrendered, Cuming was able to send boats from Russell to take possession. By 14:00, most of the Danish line had surrendered and terms were agreed for a ceasefire. Six of Cuming's crew had been injured in the action, but there had been no fatalities.

The next object of the British fleet was to break the alliance further by intimidating Sweden and Russia. Nelson, in St George, was left behind with a few smaller vessels to finalise the peace agreement with Denmark while Parker left with the remainder of the fleet, including Cuming in Russell. Parker's intention was to attack the Russian fleet, ice-locked at Reval, before it could join the Swedish fleet. On the way, Parker received word that the Swedish fleet was at sea and altered course to intercept. Outnumbered and outgunned, the Swedes sought the protection of the forts at Karlskrona, where they were blockaded by the British. Following negotiations, agreement was reached on 22 April, and the British resumed their journey to Reval. On the way, news was received that the tsar had been murdered and succeeded by Alexander I, who was far better disposed to Britain, and the mission was called off. Parker was recalled to England, and command devolved to Nelson, who was not so trusting of Russia's good intentions and took 11 of his ships of the line to the Gulf of Finland anyway. Cuming, in Russell, was left behind with HMS Edgar, Saturn, Agamemnon, Raisonable, and Glatton and a frigate to cruise the coast and keep an eye on the Swedish fleet.

Cuming was later part of a squadron under Sir James Saumarez, stationed off Cadiz, where the two admirals began a lifelong friendship.

== Hostilities renewed ==
When the short-lived Peace of Amiens came to an end, Cuming was appointed to HMS Prince of Wales as flag captain to Robert Calder. On 9 July, the Admiralty received word from Nelson that the Franco-Spanish fleet had left the West Indies. Presuming this force was destined for the Channel, the Admiralty responded by ordering Prince of Wales to take up a position west of Cape Finisterre and intercept. Calder was reinforced on 15 July, giving him a total of fifteen ships of the line. The partial clearing of fog at 11:00 on 22 July revealed the allied fleet of 20 ships of the line, heading east-southeast towards Ferrol and Calder gave the order to pursue. The winds were light and the visibility so poor that Calder had to send his frigates ahead to keep track of the enemy, and it was after 17:00 before the British fleet was close enough to engage.

The action was a confused melee with neither side able to see signals nor each other. At 20:25, with the fading light and gunsmoke compounding the problem, Calder called a halt to the action, his force having captured two of the enemy ships. The following morning, the two fleets were 17 miles apart and Calder, still outnumbered and wishing to protect his prizes, chose not to renew the action. He was much criticised for his perceived lack of action and demanded a court martial to clear his name. Prince of Wales later returned to England for the hearing, depriving Nelson of one of his most powerful ships and Cuming of the opportunity to fight at the Battle of Trafalgar.

After a period as captain of HMS Isis, flagship of Erasmus Gower on the Newfoundland station, Cuming took command of HMS Sampson, flagship of Rear-Admiral Charles Stirling, in the latter half of 1806 and sailed with a convoy for Cape of Good Hope on 30 August 1806 and from there to the River Plate. Sampson returned to England in July 1807 and paid off in December. In June 1808, Cuming commissioned the newly built HMS Bombay and sailed her to the Mediterranean, where she formed part of Edward Pellew's fleet on blockade duty at Toulon. Cuming commanded HMS Royal George from February 1813 until she was laid up at Plymouth at the end of the War of the Sixth Coalition.

== Court martial ==
Lieutenant Nesbit Willoughby was one of those sent aboard Prøvesteenen at the Battle of Copenhagen, and, after suppressing a mutiny and returning to Russell with prisoners, Cuming ordered him cheered. Later, during the Baltic Campaign, when Russell was on blockade duty at Karlskrona, Willoughby was judged to be insolent by Cuming and was consequently ordered to never leave the poop deck without authorisation. In retaliation, Willoughby charged Cuming with 'unofficerlike' and 'oppressive behaviour', claiming that he struck and shoved his fellow officers while in the execution of their duties. Cuming was acquitted but Willoughby was dismissed from the service on counter-charges of insolence and contempt.

== Later life ==
Cuming was made a Companion of The Most Honourable Order of the Bath in 1815. Promoted to Rear-admiral in 1821, he died in 1824. Cuming left his estate to his nephew. He had been married to Catherine Lyde from Devon, and the couple were childless.
