= Dutch frigate Alliantie (1788) =

- Plan of Alliance drawn in 1795

History

Dutch Republic
- Name: Alliantie
- Builder: Admiralty, Amsterdam
- Launched: 20 June 1788
- Captured: 1795

Great Britain
- Name: HMS Alliance
- Acquired: 1795 by capture
- Honours and awards: Naval General Service Medal with clasp "Acre"
- Fate: Sold 1802

General characteristics
- Type: Frigate; 6th Charter (sixth rate)
- Tons burthen: 69681/94 (bm)
- Length: 139’ 8/11" (lower deck; Amsterdam foot) (Note: This linear measurement is in Amsterdam feet (voet) of 11 Amsterdam inches (duim) (see Dutch units of measurement). The Amsterdam foot is about 8% shorter than an English foot.); 130 ft 9 in (39.9 m) (o/a); 107 ft 11 3/4 in (32.912 m) (keel)
- Beam: 37’ 8/11" (Amsterdam foot); 34 ft 10 in (10.6 m)
- Draught: 15’ 8/11" (Amsterdam foot)
- Depth of hold: 15’ 8/11" (Amsterdam foot); 12 ft 11 in (3.9 m)
- Propulsion: Sails
- Complement: British service (frigate): 215; British service (storeship): 121
- Armament: Dutch service: 36 × 12-pounder guns; British service (frigate): Upper deck (UD): 26 ×12-pounder guns; QD: 4 × 6-pounder guns; 4 × 24-pounder carronades; Fc: 2 × 6-pounder guns; British service (storeship): 14 × 6-pounder guns (UD)

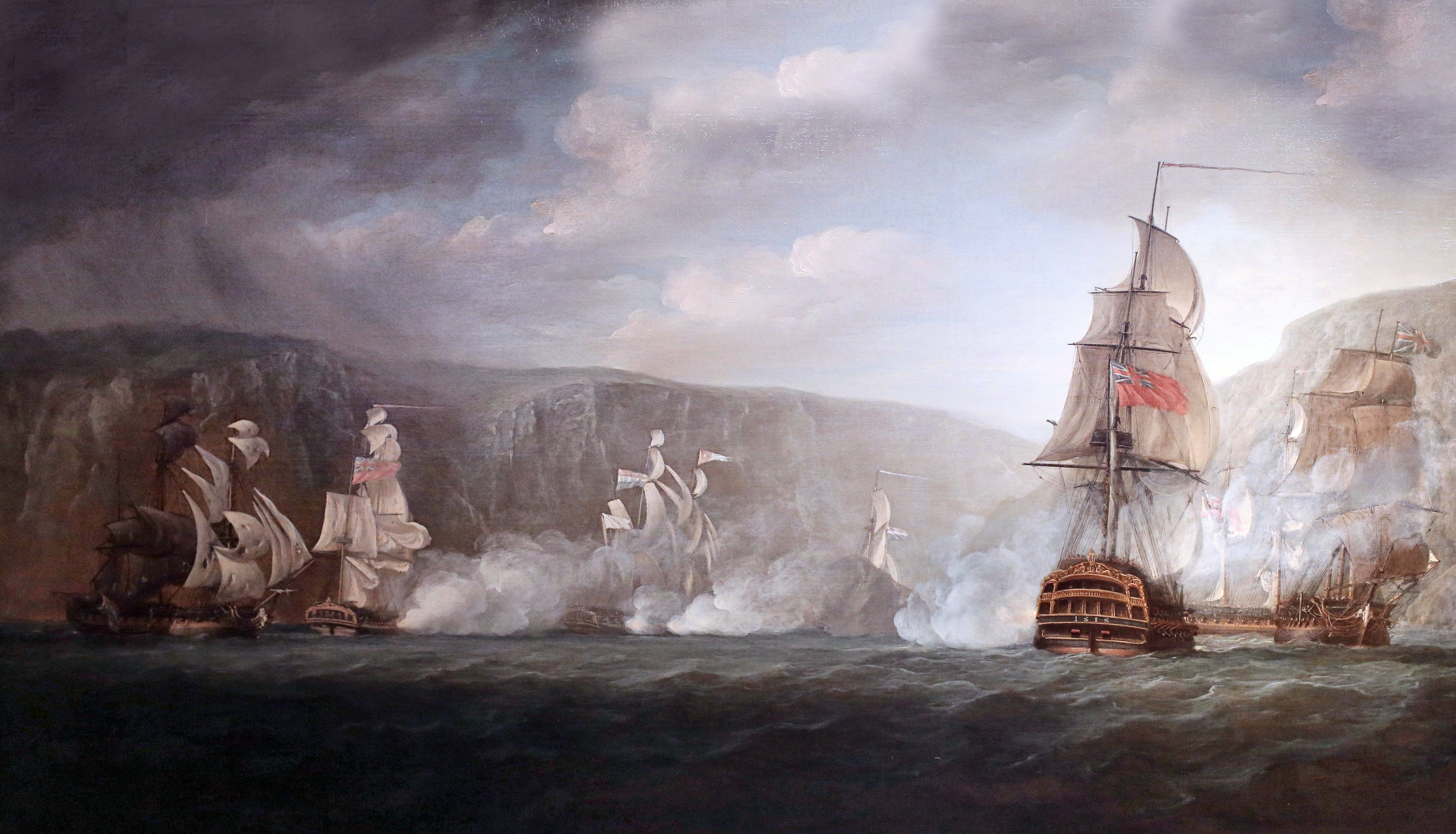
Capture of Alliantie in 1795

Alliantie was a 36-gun frigate of the Dutch States Navy launched in 1788 in Amsterdam. HMS Stag captured her from the Batavian Navy in 1795 and the Royal Navy took her into service as HMS Alliance. The Admiralty converted her to a storeship shortly after her capture and fitting. She participated in the siege of Acre in 1799 with the result that her crew qualified for the Naval General Service Medal issued in 1847. She was sold in 1802.

== Dutch service ==
In 1795, French cavalry captured Alliantie during the French capture of the Dutch fleet at Den Helder. In February 1795, she received a French crew but was probably too undermanned to be serviceable. In May, the Batavian Republic signed a peace and alliance treaty with France and the French returned Alliantie against payment.

== Capture ==
On 22 August 1795 a squadron of four British Royal Navy frigates consisting of Réunion, Stag, Isis, and Vestal, encountered two frigates and a cutter from the Navy of the Batavian Republic. The engagement was fought off the Norwegian coastal island of Eigerøya, then in Danish Norway.

At 16:15 the leading British ship, Stag, under Captain Joseph Sydney Yorke, caught and engaged the rearmost Batavian ship, Alliante; the remainder of the British squadron continued in pursuit of the Batavian squadron. For an hour Alliante held out against the more powerful Stag but eventually struck. The remainder of the Batavian squadron escaped due to a fierce rearguard action by the frigate Argo, safely reaching Eigerøya.

Casualties on Stag numbered four men killed and 13 wounded; Dutch casualties on Alliantie are unknown. Alliante sailed to Britain under the command of Lieutenant Patrick Tonyn of Stag. Alliante was subsequently taken to Spithead where the Admiralty purchased her for the Royal Navy as the frigate HMS Alliance.

== British service ==
The British fitted Alliance at Sheerness and Deptford. She had arrived at Sheerness Dockyard to be fitted on 24 September 1795, was launched on 15 October and sailed on 7 December 1795. The Admiralty registered her on 25 November 1795. She was commissioned as a storeship of 22 guns in December under Commander William Cuming (or Cumming).

Cumming received promotion to post captain on 13 October 1797. His replacement on Alliance was Commander Henry Heathcote, who was appointed in August. He received promotion to post captain on 5 February 1798.

Alliance underwent fitting at Blackwall in February and March, with Commander John Baker Hay assuming command of her in March. He sailed her to the Mediterranean Sea in June. On 2 February 1799 she was with Captain Sir Thomas Troubridge's squadron as they arrived at Alexandria. Troubridge and his squadron left Acre for Alexandria, with Sir Sidney Smith in Tigre replacing them. In March Commander David Wilmot replaced Hay. On 24 March, Alliance arrived at Acre with orders from Troubridge to discharge her cargo and return immediately. When Wilmot arrived at Acre, Smith quoted the Articles of War to the effect that His Majesty's ships were required to assist a known friend in need; he commandeered Alliance while Wilmot agreed with enthusiasm.

In the first week of April, a gale forced Tigre to stand off, but Smith reported Alliance and the gun-vessels he had captured, all except one, rode out the gale. Smith anchored Tigre and HMS Theseus, one on each side of the town, so their broadsides could assist the defence. Alliance and the gun-vessels were of shallower draft and so could come in closer. Together, they helped repel repeated French assaults.

However, on 8 April Wilmot received a fatal shot through the neck from a rifleman as Wilmot mounted a howitzer on the breach in the wall at Acre. Additionally, the day before Alliance had three men wounded. The French attacked multiple times between 19 March and 10 May before Napoleon finally gave up. On 21 May he destroyed his siege train and retreated back to Egypt, having lost 2,200 men dead, 1,000 of them to the plague.

Smith sailed with his squadron on 12 June. He proceeded first to Beruta road, and then to Larnica road, Cyprus, in order to refit his little squadron. He and Tigre then departed for Constantinople, Alliance and the gun-vessels remaining in the theatre. By 11 September 1800, Alliance was at Portsmouth, because on that day Lieutenant E. H. Clark of Alliance underwent a court martial on board Gladiator for being absent without leave. Clark was found guilty; he was dismissed from service, and from serving in any capacity whatever in the Royal Navy. Commander John Melhuish assumed command in December.

Alliance continued to serve on the Lisbon, Gibraltar, and Mediterranean station, traveling back and forth between Britain and the station. On 10 May 1801 Alliance arrived at Portsmouth from the Mediterranean, via Gibraltar. A week later she sailed for the Downs.

== Fate ==
Alliance was sold at Sheerness in May 1802.
