= Henry Yorke =

Henry Yorke may refer to:

- Henry Vincent Yorke (1905–1973), English author with the pen name Henry Green
- Henry Redhead Yorke (1772–1813), English writer and radical publicist
- Henry Redhead Yorke (British politician) (1802–1848), British Whig politician (son of the above)
- Henry Yorke (priest) (1803–1871), Archdeacon of Huntington
- Henry Yorke, alias of the fictional vampire Hal Yorke in the British TV Series Being Human
