= Action of 22 August 1795 =

1795 battle of the War of the First Coalition

- Part of the War of the First Coalition
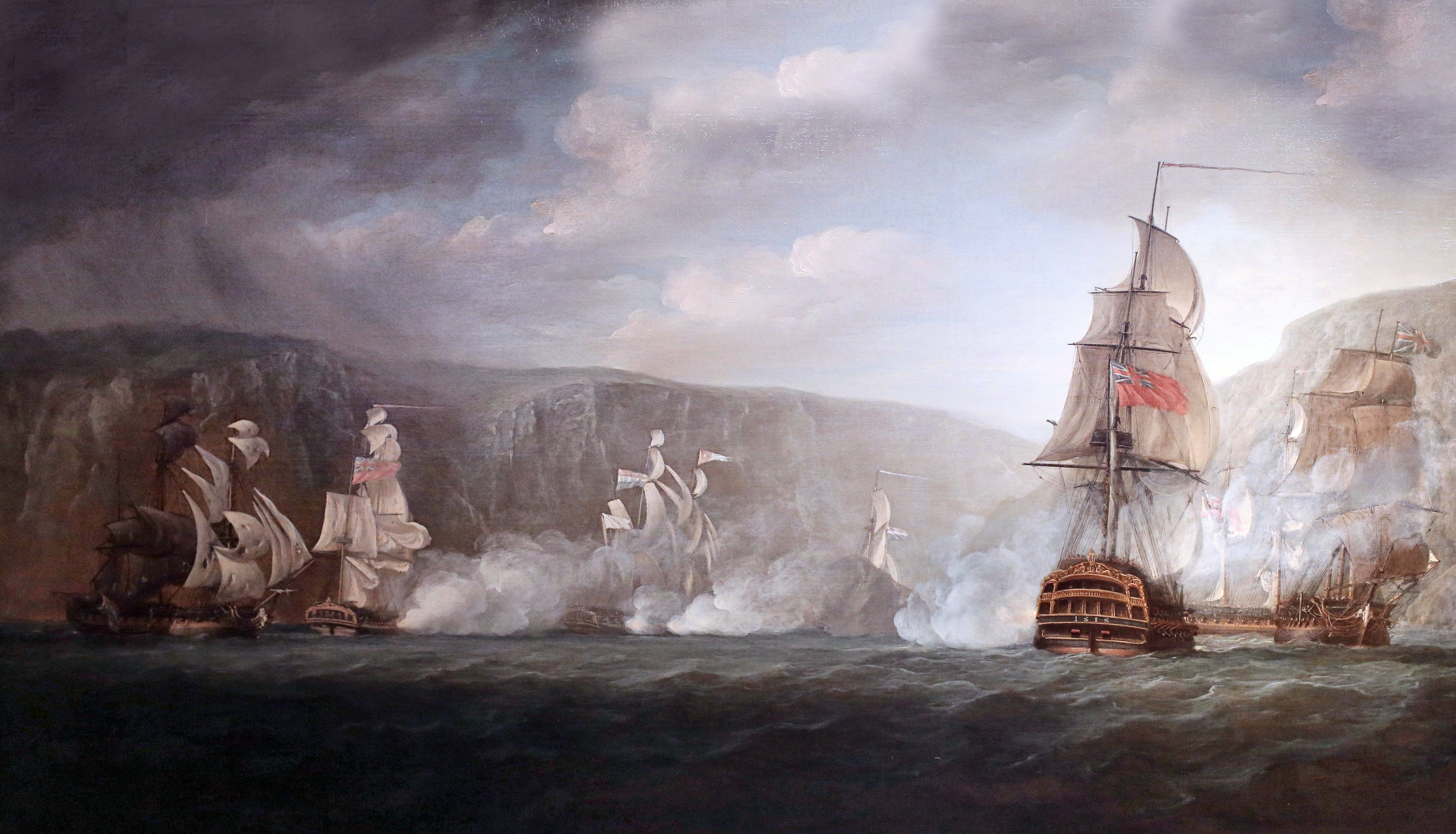
- Painting of the battle by Nicholas Pocock
Date	22 August 1795
Location	Off Eigerøya, North Sea 58°26′35″N 05°49′00″E
Result	British victory

Belligerents
Great Britain	Batavian Republic

Commanders and leaders
James Alms	Arnold van Dirckinck

Strength
1 ship of the line 3 frigates	2 frigates 1 cutter

Casualties and losses
5 killed 18 wounded	2 killed 15 wounded 1 frigate captured

Map of the North Sea, the battle identified by the red mark

The action of 22 August 1795 was fought during the War of the First Coalition between a Royal Navy squadron of four frigates and a Batavian Navy squadron of two frigates and a cutter. Fought off the Norwegian coastal island of Eigerøya, then part of Denmark–Norway, the battle came about due to both squadrons' missions to protect their countries' trade routes to the Baltic Sea. Though Britain and the Batavian Republic were at peace, in Spring 1795 the British Admiralty ordered Royal Navy ships to begin intercepting Batavian shipping due to the Batavian Republic's status as a client state of Revolutionary France, which Britain was at war with.

A British squadron of four frigates under Captain James Alms was patrolling the entrance to the Skagerrak in August 1795 when three ships were spotted off the Norwegian coast to the north. Closing to investigate, the ships were discovered to be a Batavian squadron of two frigates and a small cutter under Captain Arnold Christiaan Leopold van Dirckinck. In the face of Alms' larger squadron the Batavian force turned away, sailing southeast along the Norwegian coast with the British approaching from the south in an effort to cut them off from the neutral Norwegian shore. At 16:15 the leading British ship HMS Stag caught and engaged the rearmost Batavian ship Alliantie; the remainder of Alms' squadron continued in pursuit of the Batavian ships. For an hour Alliantie traded broadsides with the more powerful Stag and was eventually forced to strike her colours. The remainder of the Batavian squadron escaped due to a fierce rearguard action by the frigate Argo, reaching the safety of the neutral harbour at Eigerøya.

== Background ==
In the winter of 1794–1795 Revolutionary France overran the Dutch Republic, which was part of the anti-French First Coalition formed in April 1792. The Dutch Republic was transformed into a French client state known as the Batavian Republic. News of the Dutch Republic's fall, in particular the capture of the Dutch fleet at Den Helder by French cavalry, was met with particular alarm by the British Admiralty, which in Spring 1795 ordered the Royal Navy to detain warships and merchantmen of the new Batavian Republic. This initiated an undeclared war between the two nations.

In response to the threat that the Batavian Navy posed, the Admiralty reactivated the North Sea Fleet under Admiral of the Blue Adam Duncan; based at Yarmouth in East Anglia, the fleet mainly consisted of older and smaller ships of the line. Duncan was also provided with several frigates, essential in securing British trade with the Baltic. Much of Britain's vital naval stores were obtained from Scandinavia and British trade routes through the Baltic and North seas were instrumental to maintaining the Royal Navy. On 8 August 1795 a British squadron under Captain James Alms set sail from the Downs with instructions to cruise off the Skaggerak's mouth in the Eastern North Sea. Alms' squadron comprised three frigates, the 36-gun HMS Reunion under Alms, the 32-gun HMS Stag under Captain Joseph Sydney Yorke and the 28-gun HMS Vestal under Captain Charles White along with the 50-gun ship of the line HMS Isis under Captain Robert Watson.

Scandinavian trade routes were equally important for the Batavian Navy, and to protect their merchant shipping from British naval attacks the Batavian government sent a frigate squadron under Captain Arnold Christiaan Leopold van Dirckinck to the region. The squadron comprised the 36-gun frigates Argo (under van Dirckinck) and Alliantie (under Captain Claas Jager) along with the 16-gun cutter Vlugheid . On the afternoon of 22 August 1795 the Batavian squadron was sailing southeast along the Norwegian coast, then part of Denmark–Norway, tacking to port towards the land, when Alms' squadron was spotted approaching from the south.

== Battle ==
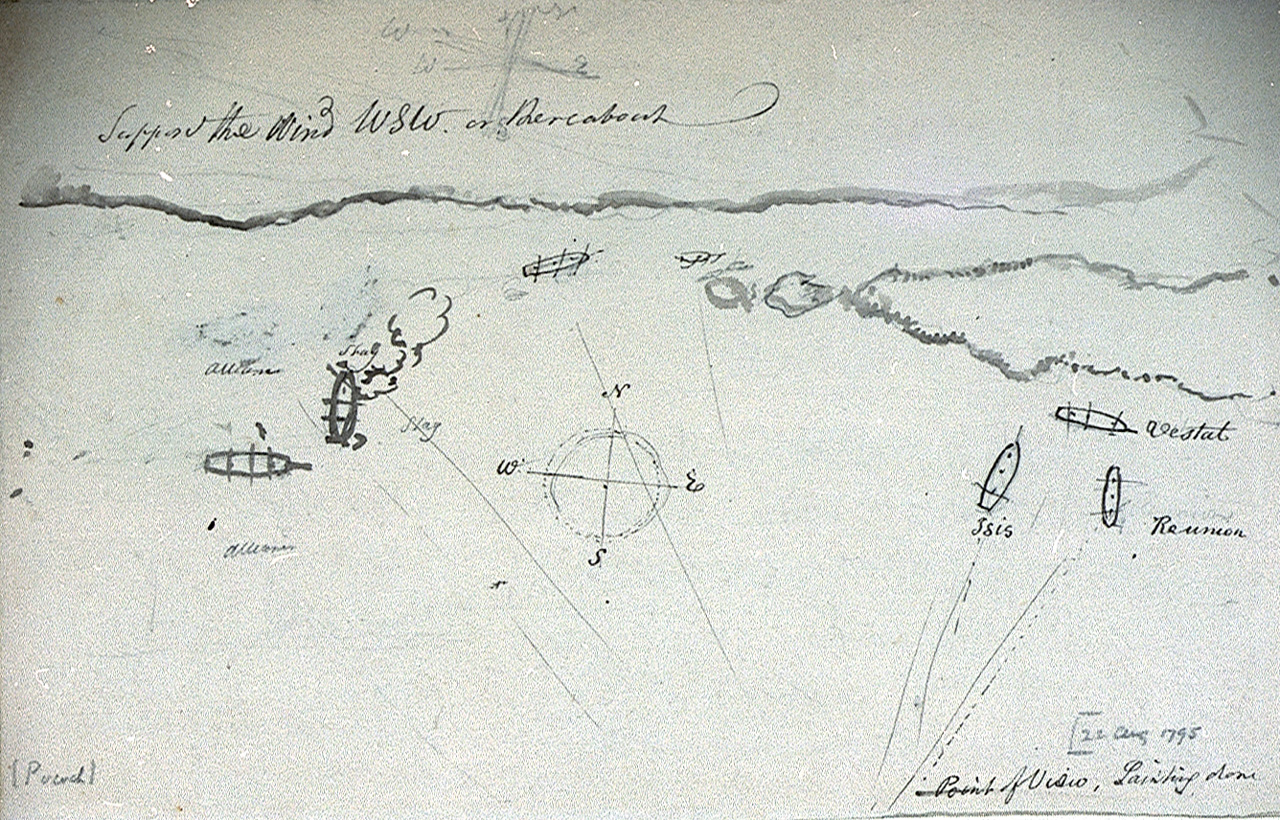
Plan of the battle by Nicholas Pocock

With their ships heavily outnumbered by the approaching British, the Batavian squadron made all sail along the coastline with the intention of sheltering in the neutral Dano-Norwegian harbour of Eigerøya. Sighting the Batavian ships to the north, Alms ordered his squadron to give chase. Soon the fastest British ship, Stag made use of favourable wind to pull ahead of the others and at 16:15 succeeded in cutting off the rearmost Batavian vessel Alliantie from its companions. Although Alliantie with its 36-guns was a stronger ship than the 32-gun Stag, its main battery was of only 12-pounder cannon compared to Yorke's 18-pounder guns. This, coupled with the presence nearby of the rest of the British squadron meant that Alliantie, in the words of naval historian William James, "from the first, had no chance of success."

Despite the odds against him, the Batavian captain engaged Stag, Yorke laying his ship alongside Alliantie and the frigates exchanging broadsides for an hour before the Batavian captain, his situation hopeless and his ship outnumbered and battered, surrendered at 17:15. While Stag and Alliantie fought their duel, the action continued elsewhere, with the remaining Batavian ships making progress eastwards along the Norwegian coastline with the British squadron attempting to cut them off from the channel between Eigerøya and the Norwegian mainland in which the Batavian ships could shelter, protected by Dano-Norwegian neutrality. Vlugheid rapidly outdistanced pursuit, but Argo was slower and came under heavy but distant fire from Reunion and Isis, replying in kind. Argo was subsequently found to have been hit thirty times by 24-pounder shot and had much of its sails and rigging torn away, requiring extensive repairs. Eventually the Batavian persistence paid off, and Vlugheid and Argo successfully escaped into the neutral harbour of Eigerøya before Alms could intercept them.

== Aftermath ==
The British suffered four killed and 13 wounded on Stag, one killed and three wounded on Reunion and two wounded on Isis. Only Vestal suffered no damage or casualties. Total Batavian casualties in the engagement are unknown due to Alms' failure to record Alliantie's losses in his report to the Admiralty. It is known that Argo lost two men killed and 15 wounded in the chase. Alms sent Alliantie to England under Lieutenant Patrick Tonyn of Stag and ordered Lieutenant William Huggell of Reunion to deliver despatches to the Admiralty. He remained at sea with his squadron, completing their assigned patrol. The surviving Batavian ships remained at anchor in the Eigerøya channel until the spring of 1796, when they successfully returned to Dutch ports. Alliantie was taken to Spithead and purchased by the Royal Navy, which renamed her HMS Alliance. Prize money was distributed to the crews of Alms' ships and shared equally among them; the crew of Isis alone shared £240 (the equivalent of £24,962 as of 2025). The crew of Alliantie were sent to Ashford, Kent as prisoners of war. Over the ensuing years, Duncan's fleet largely protected Britain's North Sea trade routes from Batavian attacks and in 1797 decisively defeated the Batavian navy at the Battle of Camperdown.

When news of the battle reached the Batavian Republic, there was widespread anger as they were at peace with Britain. On 3 September, the Provisional Representatives of the People of Holland issued a resolution ordering the Dutch envoy in Copenhagen Christiaan Bangeman Huygens to lodge a complaint over Alm's alleged violation of Dano-Norwegian neutrality. Huygens claimed in his complaint that Norwegian pilots had already gone onboard the Batavian ships prior to the battle, indicating that they had entered Dano-Norwegian waters; he also demanded that Denmark make representations at the Court of St James's to return Alliantie to Batavian control.

Vice-admiral Jan Willem de Winter, the Batavian Navy's commander-in-chief, issued a proclamation after the battle praising the conduct of van Dirckinck's squadron and denouncing Alms'. The proclamation also claimed that the Batavian brigs Echo, Gier and Mercuur seized four British merchantmen and brought them into Kristiansand on 22 August in reprisal. However, the Dutch historian Gerrit Dirk Bom noted that de Winter was mistaken and that the brigs actually seized the four ships (along with another brig) on 19 August, which may have caused Alms to attack the Batavian squadron. On 19 September, Huygens wrote to the Provisional Representatives, confirming that the Danish government had made diplomatic overtures to the British, which ultimately proved to be pointless as Britain had already declared war on the Batavian Republic on 15 September. In the letter, Huygens also noted that the crews of the four merchantmen had been delivered to the British consul in Kristiansand, John Mitchell, on 22 August.
