= James Woodford (bishop) =

English churchman (1820–1885)

The Right Reverend James Woodford
- Bishop of Ely
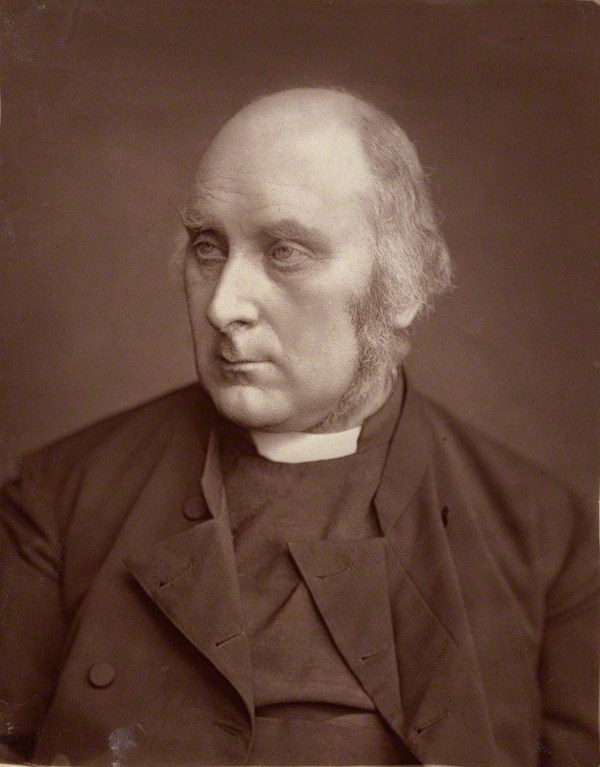
- Church: Church of England
- Diocese: Diocese of Ely
- In office: 1873–1885
- Predecessor: Harold Browne
- Successor: Lord Alwyne Compton

Orders
- Ordination: 1843 (deacon); 1845 (priest)
- Consecration: 14 December 1873

Personal details
- Born: 30 April 1820 Henley-on-Thames
- Died: 21 October 1885 (aged 65) Ely, Cambridgeshire
- Buried: Ely Cathedral
- Denomination: Anglican
- Education: Merchant Taylors' School
- Alma mater: Pembroke College, Cambridge

James Russell Woodford (30 April 1820 – 21 October 1885) was an English churchman who was Bishop of Ely from 1873 to his death in 1885.

== Life ==
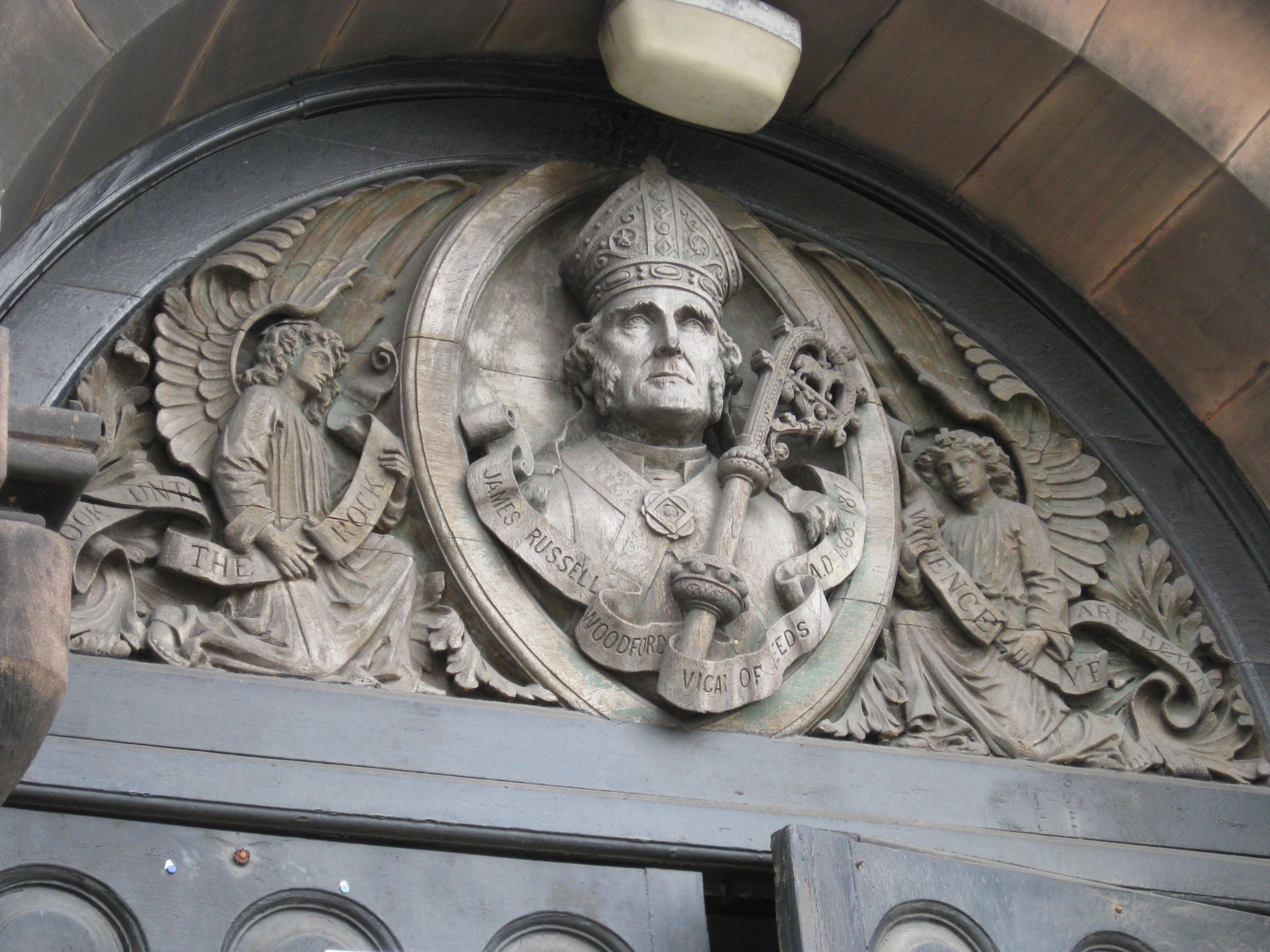
Depiction above the main door to St Aidan's Church, Leeds

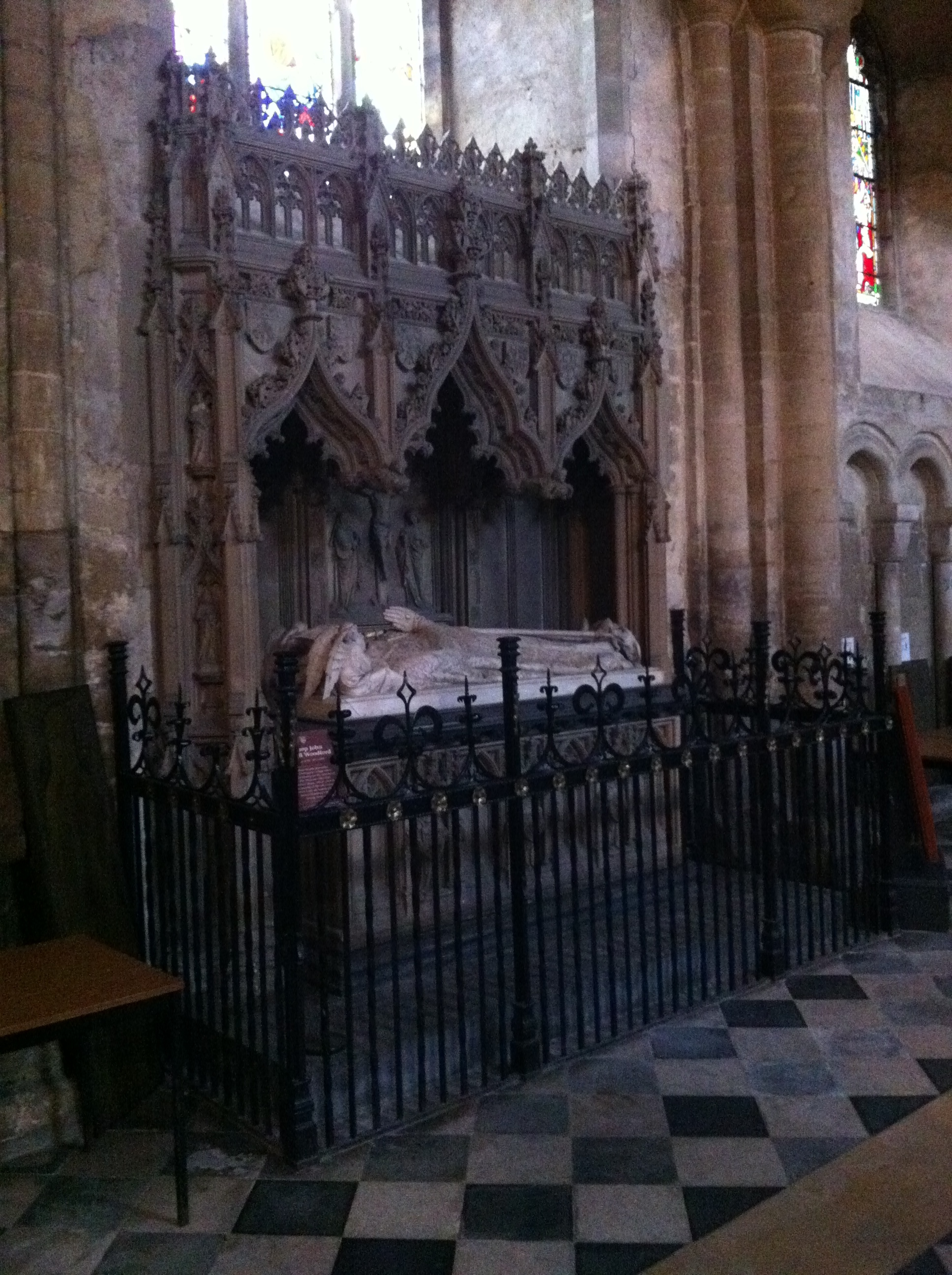
Memorial to Bishop John Russell Woodford in Ely Cathedral

Born on 30 April 1820 at Henley-on-Thames, he was the only son of James Russell Woodford, a hop-merchant in Southwark, and Frances, daughter of Robert Appleton of Henley. He was sent to Merchant Taylors' School at the age of eight, and was elected to Pembroke College, Cambridge, as Parkins exhibitioner in 1838. He graduated B.A. in 1842, and M.A. in 1845. He was ordained deacon in 1843 and priest in 1845, and in the intervening years held the second mastership of Bishop's College, Bristol. His first incumbency was the parish of St. Saviour's, Coalpit-heath, Bristol from 25th June 1845. He then worked as vicar of the parish of St. Mark's, Easton, in the same district, between 1847 and 1855, and in the latter year was presented to the vicarage of Kempsford, Gloucestershire.

Woodford was one of the eighteen clergy who in the following year signed the protest against the primate John Bird Sumner's condemnation of Archdeacon George Anthony Denison. During the thirteen years he was at Kempsford he attracted attention as a preacher, and was made by Bishop Samuel Wilberforce one of his examining chaplains, Woodford became honorary canon of Christchurch, and in 1864 was for the first time a select preacher at Cambridge, He also acted as proctor for the clergy of his diocese in the Canterbury convocation, In 1868 Woodford was appointed vicar of Leeds. In 1869 he received a D.D. degree from the primate, and in 1872 was appointed one of the queen's chaplains. In the following year he succeeded Harold Browne as bishop of Ely, being consecrated in Westminster Abbey on 14 December 1873.

Soon after his succession to the see Woodford set on foot a general diocesan fund to be applied towards the increase of church accommodation and the assistance of poor parishes and incumbents. He was very active in the work of church restoration, and he reconstructed the cathedral school at Ely. In 1877 he revived, after a disuse of nearly 150 years, the visitation of the cathedral church. Woodford also established Ely Theological College, where twelve students were housed and trained for parochial work,

Woodford died, unmarried, at Ely on 21 October 1885. He was buried on the south side of the cathedral choir on the 30th. His name lives on in the Diocese of Ely's Bishop Woodford House Retreat and Conference Centre.

== Works ==
Woodford published:

- The Church, Past and Present, 1852.
- Seventeen Sermons, 1854; 2nd ed. 1860.
- Six Lectures on the Creed, 1855.
- Occasional Sermons, 1st ser 1856, 2nd ed. 1864; 2nd ser. 1861, 2nd ed. 1865.
- Christian Sanctity, four sermons at Cambridge, 1863.

He also contributed to Sermons for the Working Classes, 1858, and to the series of New Testament Commentaries, 1870; and wrote prefaces for William Baker's Manual of Devotion, 1877, William Arthur Brameld's In Type and Shadow, 1880, and The Private Devotions of Bishop Andrewes, 1883. Woodford was co-editor with Hyde Wyndham Beadon of the Parish Hymn Book, 1883, and assisted in the compilation of the Sarum Hymnal in 1868. In 1864 he edited the third series of Tracts for the Christian Seasons, and in 1877 a volume of Samuel Wilberforce's Sermons on various Occasions.

The Great Commission: Twelve Ordination Addresses (1886, 8vo), and Sermons on Subjects from the Old Testament (1887, 8vo; 2nd ed. 1888), appeared posthumously, edited by H. M. Luckock.

== Notes ==
Church of England titles
Preceded by Harold Browne	Bishop of Ely; 1873–1885	Succeeded by Alwyne Compton
