= Grantham Yorke =

Grantham Munton Yorke (14 February 1809 – 2 October 1879) was Dean of Worcester from 1874 until his death.

Yorke was the fourth son of Admiral Sir Joseph Sydney Yorke. He was educated at Charterhouse School, and had a career in the army, enlisting in 1826 and retiring at the rank of Lieutenant in 1833. He was admitted to Queens' College, Cambridge in 1832, and to Trinity College Dublin in 1834, and was ordained deacon in 1835 and priest in 1837.

In 1844 he became the incumbent at St Philip, Birmingham, a post he held until his elevation to the Deanery.

His daughter Constance Ellen married the Rev. William Henry Lyttelton (1820–1884).

Church of England titles
Preceded by John Peel	Dean of Worcester; 1874–1879	Succeeded by Lord Alwyne Compton
