= Joseph Sydney Yorke =

Royal Navy officer (1768–1831)

Admiral Sir Joseph Sydney Yorke KCB
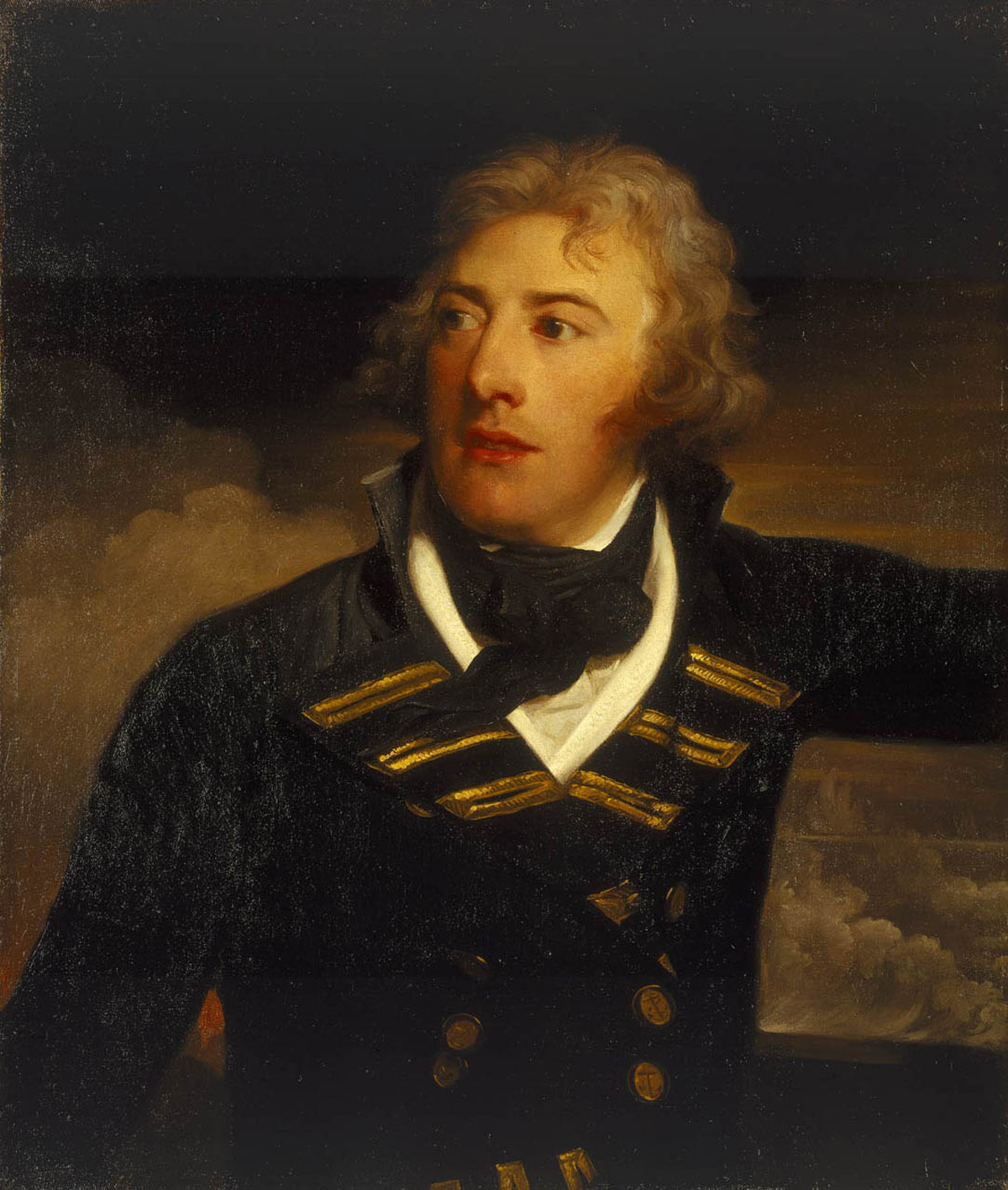
- Portrait by Henri-Pierre Danloux, c. 1787–1795
- Born: 6 June 1768; London, England
- Died: 5 May 1831 (aged 62); Spithead, Hampshire
- Children: 7, inlaying Charles, Henry, Eliot, and Grantham
- Relatives: Charles Yorke (father); Philip Yorke (brother); Charles Philip Yorke (brother)
- Military career
- Allegiance: Great Britain; United Kingdom
- Branch: Royal Navy
- Service years: 1780–1831
- Rank: Admiral
- Commands: HMS Rattlesnake; HMS Circe; HMS Stag; HMS Jason; HMS Canada; HMS Prince George; HMS Barfleur; HMS Christian VII
- Conflicts: American War of Independence; Battle of the Saintes; French Revolutionary Wars; Action of 22 August 1795; Napoleonic Wars
- Awards: Knight Commander of the Order of the Bath; Knight Bachelor

Admiral Sir Joseph Sydney Yorke KCB (6 June 1768 – 5 May 1831) was a Royal Navy officer. As a junior officer he saw action at the Battle of the Saintes in April 1782 during the American War of Independence. He commanded HMS Stag at the action of 22 August 1795 during the French Revolutionary Wars and went on to be First Naval Lord during the closing stages of the Napoleonic Wars.

== Family and early life ==
Yorke was born in Great Berkhampstead, Hertfordshire, on 6 June 1768, the second son, by his second wife Agneta, of the politician Charles Yorke. He joined the navy at the age of 11, becoming a midshipman aboard HMS Duke, then under the command of Sir Charles Douglas, on 15 February 1780. He followed Douglas to his next command, HMS Formidable, which flew the flag of Admiral George Rodney. Yorke was then present at Rodney's victory over François Joseph Paul de Grasse at the Battle of the Saintes from 9 to 12 April 1782. The end of the American War of Independence led to the Formidable returning to Britain to be paid off. Yorke remained in employment however, transferring with Douglas to HMS Assistance, and then moving to HMS Salisbury, under the command of Sir Erasmus Gower, filling the post of master's mate. Yorke spent three years in total serving on the Newfoundland Station.

== Promotions ==
Yorke was promoted to Lieutenant (navy)lieutenant on 16 June 1789 and transferred to the 50-gun HMS Adamant to serve under Admiral Sir Richard Hughes. He later served as lieutenant aboard HMS Thisbe and HMS Victory and in February 1791 he was appointed master and commander of the sloop HMS Rattlesnake. He remained aboard her, carrying out cruises into the English Channel until the outbreak of war with Revolutionary France on 1 February 1793. He was promoted to Post-Captain on 4 February 1793 and given command of the frigate HMS Circe, then part of a squadron under Admiral Richard Howe. He patrolled off the French port of Brest, and captured the corvette L'Espiegle.

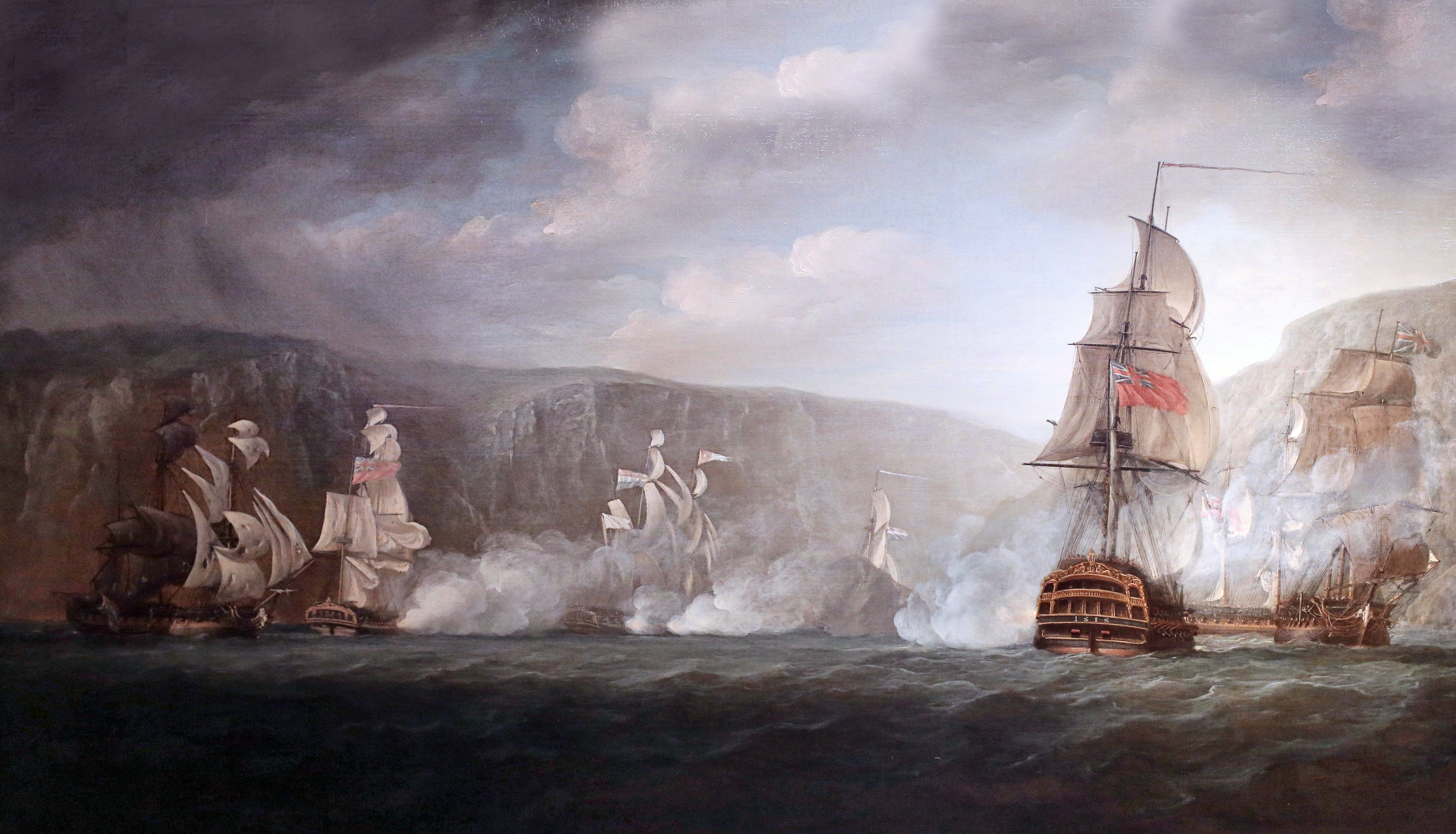
The action of 22 August 1795, which Yorke took part in

Yorke moved to HMS Stag in July 1794, and continued to serve in the Channel, occasionally ranging into the North Sea. On 22 August 1795 the Stag and a small British squadron chased two frigates and a cutter, eventually bringing the sternmost one to battle. An hour-long fight ensued, after which the enemy ship, subsequently found to be the Batavian Navy frigate Alliantie, was forced to surrender. Yorke moved to command the newly built HMS Jason in March 1800, and by 1801 was in command of the 74-gun third rate HMS Canada. He commanded her until the Treaty of Amiens in 1802 brought a period of temporary peace. On the resumption of the war in 1803 Yorke was appointed to the 98-gun HMS Prince George, followed by HMS Barfleur and then HMS Christian VII, an 80-gun former Danish ship captured at the Battle of Copenhagen in 1807.

== Knighthood and flag rank ==
Yorke was knighted during this period of service, on 21 April 1805, by King George III. On 23 April, Yorke was present at the installation of the Knights of the Garter, standing in for his brother, Philip Yorke, Earl of Hardwicke. Philip was at this time Lord Lieutenant of Ireland, and so was unable to be present in person. In 1810 Joseph Yorke's brother, Charles Philip Yorke became First Lord of the Admiralty and Joseph was transferred from command of the Christian VII to take up a seat on the Board of Admiralty.

Joseph Yorke was promoted to Rear-Admiral of the Blue on 31 July 1810 and hoisted his flag in the 74-gun HMS Vengeance in January 1811. He sailed to the Tagus carrying reinforcements for Arthur Wellesley's army, fighting in the Peninsular War. After carrying this out he escorted a fleet returning to Britain from the East Indies. Yorke was promoted to Rear-Admiral of the White on 12 August 1812, Rear-Admiral of the Red on 4 December 1813 and Vice-Admiral of the Blue on 14 June 1814. He served as First Naval Lord in the Liverpool ministry from October 1813 until May 1816 but remained on the Admiralty Board until April 1818. He was appointed a Knight Commander of the Order of the Bath (KCB) in the restructuring of that order in January 1815, promoted Vice-Admiral of the White on 12 August 1819, and promoted to Admiral of the Blue on 22 July 1830.

== Parliamentary career ==
Yorke stood as a candidate for the constituency of Reigate in 1790, and was returned as its member. He represented the borough until 1806, when he was elected as member for St Germans. He stood aside, "taking the Chiltern Hundreds" in 1810 so that his brother, Charles Philip Yorke, could be elected. In the 1812 general election Joseph Yorke stood as a candidate for Sandwich and was returned as its member. He represented the borough until 1818 when he was re-elected to the Reigate constituency, which he represented until his death. Yorke's business interests include the chairmanship of the Waterloo Bridge Company.

== Family and personal life ==
On 29 March 1798, Yorke married Elizabeth Wheake Rattray, the daughter of James and Henrietta Rattray, in Ireland. Elizabeth died on 31 January 1812. Elizabeth's personal Bible gives the marriage date as 28 March and her date of death as 31 January 1812. The marriage was at Hound, north of Hamble. They had the following children:

- Charles Philip Yorke (1799–1873), Admiral in the Navy, succeeded as 4th Earl of Hardwicke
- Sidney Yorke (January 1801 – 1812)
- Henry Reginald Yorke (30 October 1802 – 1871), Archdeacon of Huntingdon and Canon of Ely
- Eliot Thomas Yorke (April 1805 – 1885), barrister and MP
- Horatio Nelson Yorke (13 August 1806 – March 1814)
- Grantham Munton Yorke (14 February 1809 – 1879), Dean of Worcester
- Agneta Elizabeth Yorke (9 December 1811 – 1851), married Robert Cooper Lee Bevan, banker

On 22 May 1813, Joseph married a second time, to Urania Anne, the Dowager Marchioness of Clanricarde, and daughter of George Paulet, 12th Marquess of Winchester, at St. Martin in the Fields, Westminster, London. The marriage did not produce any children.

== Death ==
On 5 May 1831 Yorke was returning from visiting Henry Hotham's flagship, HMS St Vincent, then moored at Spithead. He was making his way back to shore aboard the yacht Catherine, in company with Captains Matthew Barton Bradby and Thomas Young, and a seaman named John Chandler, when the boat was struck by lightning in Stokes Bay, causing it to capsize. All aboard were drowned. The bodies were later recovered and an inquest returned a verdict of accidental death. Yorke was buried at the family tomb in the parish church at Wimpole, close to Wimpole Hall, the seat of the Earls of Hardwicke.

== Sources ==
- "The Services of the late Admiral Sir Joseph Sydney Yorke". The United Service Magazine. 1831. pp. 215–217.
- J. K. Laughton, ‘Yorke, Sir Joseph Sydney (1768–1831)’, rev. Andrew Lambert, Oxford Dictionary of National Biography, Oxford University Press, 2004, doi:10.1093/ref:odnb/30244. The first edition of this text is available at Wikisource: "Yorke, Joseph Sydney" . Dictionary of National Biography. London: Smith, Elder & Co. 1885–1900.
- Rodger, N.A.M. (1979). The Admiralty. Offices of State. Lavenham: T. Dalton Ltd. ISBN 0900963948.

Military offices
Preceded by William Domett	First Naval Lord; 1813–1816	Succeeded by Sir Graham Moore
Parliament of Great Britain
Preceded by Reginald Pole-Carew; The Lord Hood	Member of Parliament for Reigate; 1790–1801; With: John Somers Cocks	Succeeded by (Parliament of the United Kingdom)
Parliament of the United Kingdom
Preceded by (Parliament of Great Britain)	Member of Parliament for Reigate; 1801–1806; With: John Somers Cocks 1801–1806; Philip James Cocks 1806	Succeeded by Edward Charles Somers Cocks; Viscount Royston
Preceded by Lord Binning; James Langham	Member of Parliament for St Germans; 1806–1810; With: Matthew Montagu	Succeeded by Charles Philip Yorke; Matthew Montagu
Preceded by Ralph Allen Daniell; James Buller	Member of Parliament for West Looe; January–October 1812; With: Ralph Allen Daniell	Succeeded by Charles Buller; Anthony Buller
Preceded by John Spratt Rainier; Charles Jenkinson	Member of Parliament for Sandwich; 1812–1818; With: Joseph Marryat	Succeeded by Joseph Marryat; Sir George Warrender
Preceded by James Cocks; John Somers Cocks	Member of Parliament for Reigate; 1818–1831; With: James Somers Cocks 1818–1823; James Cocks 1823–1831; Joseph Yorke 1831	Succeeded by Joseph Yorke; Charles Philip Yorke
