= Horatio Arthur Yorke =

Lieutenant-Colonel Sir Horatio Arthur Yorke (3 June 1848 – 10 December 1930) CB RE was Inspector of Railways to the Board of Trade from 1900 to 1913.

== Life ==
He was born on 3 June 1848 near New Wimpole in Cambridgeshire, the fourth son of the Ven the Hon Henry Reginald Yorke (1803-1871) and Flora Elizabeth Campbell (1813-1852).

He was educated at Cheam School and then Charterhouse School.

On 24 August 1869, he married Harriette Forsse in Gravesend, Kent. This marriage ended in divorce in 1891. On 26 July 1893 he married Rebecca Caroline Garstin (d.1943), daughter of the Revd. Anthony Gartin, Rector of St Peter's Church, Redmile, Leicestershire.

He was appointed a Companion of the Order of the Bath in 1904 and knighted on his retirement in 1913.

He died on 10 December 1930 in London and left an estate valued at £4,234 (equivalent to £239,300 in 2025).

== Military career ==
He entered the Royal Military College, Sandhurst in 1865. A year later, he joined the Royal Engineers and entered the Royal Military Academy, Woolwich. In 1869 he was promoted to Lieutenant and received a second commission in the Royal Engineers. He saw service in the Afghan War 1878-80. In 1881 he was promoted to the rank of captain. He also saw service in the Mahdist War 1884-85 and in 1887 achieved the rank of major. He was promoted to lieutenant-colonel in 1894.

== Career ==
He was the British delegate to the International Railway Congresses at Washington in 1905 and at Berne in 1910, and at the International Navigation Congress at Philadelphia in 1912.

He was a director of the Grand Trunk Railway of Canada, and later a director of the Great Western Railway.

The Board of Trade appointed him as Inspector of Railways in 1891. Following the death of Francis Marindin as Chief Inspecting Officer of Railways in 1899, he succeeded him on a salary of £1,000 (equivalent to £106,300 in 2025) per annum. Towards the end of his career, it had risen to £1,400 per annum. He retired in 1913.
