= John Peel (priest) =

British priest (1798–1875)

John Peel (22 August 1798 – 20 February 1875) was Dean of Worcester from 1845 until his death.

The eighth child and fourth son of Sir Robert Peel Bt MP (and the younger brother of Sir Robert Peel Bt MP, the prime minister), he was educated at Christ Church, Oxford. He held the living at Stone, Worcestershire, from 1828; and in the same year was appointed a Prebendary of Canterbury Cathedral.

== Notes ==
Church of England titles
Preceded by George Murray	Dean of Worcester; 1845–1874	Succeeded by Grantham Yorke
