= Lord Alwyne Compton (bishop) =

British Anglican bishop

The Right Reverend Lord Alwyne Compton
- Bishop of Ely
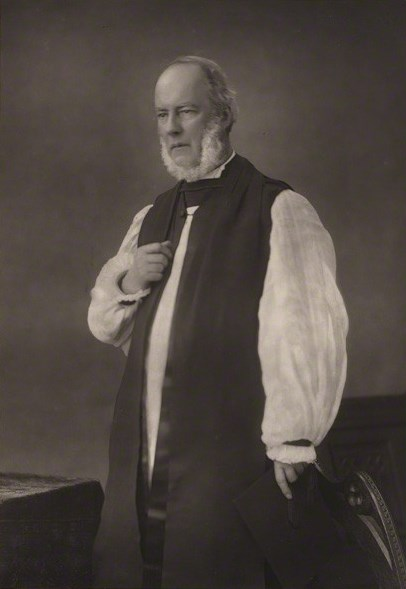
- Diocese: Ely
- In office: 1886–1905
- Predecessor: James Woodford
- Successor: Frederic Chase
- Other post: Dean of Worcester (1879–1886)

Personal details
- Born: 18 July 1825
- Died: 4 April 1906 (aged 80)
- Denomination: Anglican
- Parents: Spencer Compton, 2nd Marquess of Northampton
- Education: Trinity College, Cambridge

Lord Alwyne Compton (18 July 1825 – 4 April 1906) was an Anglican bishop in the late 19th and early 20th centuries.

== Life and career ==
Compton was the fourth son of Spencer Compton, 2nd Marquess of Northampton, and was educated at Eton and Trinity College, Cambridge. His first post was as curate at Horsham, after which he was Rector of Castle Ashby, a post he held for 26 years. He was also Archdeacon of Oakham for the last four years of this period. In 1879, he was appointed Dean of Worcester, and then in 1886 to the See of Ely, He held this position until 1905, when he resigned and retired to Canterbury, where he died the following year.

Lord Alwyne Compton was Lord High Almoner from 1882 to 1906.

On 28 August 1850 Lord Alwyne Compton married Florence Caroline Anderson (d.1918), eldest daughter of Robert Anderson, a Brighton clergyman, and his wife, the Hon. Caroline Dorothea Shore. They remained childless.

Church of England titles
New office	Archdeacon of Oakham; 1875–1879	Succeeded by Prideaux Lightfoot
Preceded by Grantham Yorke	Dean of Worcester; 1879–1886	Succeeded by John Gott
Preceded by James Woodford	Bishop of Ely; 1886–1905	Succeeded by Frederic Chase
