= Herbert Mortimer Luckock =

British Anglican priest (1833–1909)

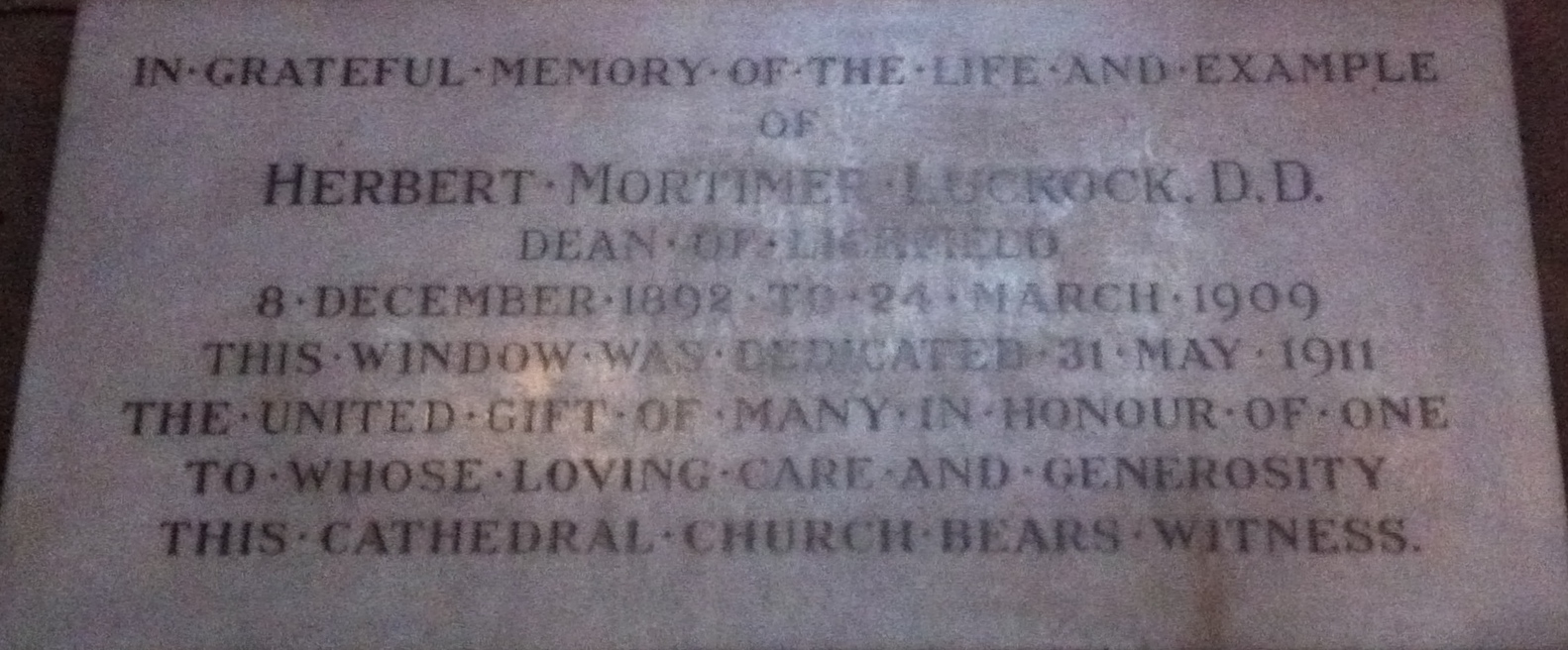
Memorial to Herbert Mortimer Luckock in Lichfield Cathedral

Herbert Mortimer Luckock (11 July 1833 – 24 March 1909 ) was a British Anglican priest in the Church of England.

== Life ==
Luckock was born in 1833 at Great Barr, Staffordshire, the son of the Rev. Thomas George Mortimer Luckock and Harriet Anne Chune. He was educated at Marlborough College, Shrewsbury School and Jesus College, Cambridge. In 1858, he was awarded a B.A. He was ordained a deacon in 1860 and a priest in 1862 and received his M.A. Vicar of All Saints' church, Cambridge 1862–1862, 1865–1875. Fellow and Dean of Jesus College, Cambridge. In 1875, he was made a canon of Ely Cathedral and principal of Ely Theological College. His theological standpoint was Anglo-Catholic. In 1892 he was appointed the Dean of Lichfield Cathedral until his death in 1909 aged 75.

In youth Luckock had played cricket for Shrewsbury School when he appeared in one county match for Shropshire in 1853.

== Personal life ==
He married Margret Emma Thompson in Childwall Church on 5 April 1866. They had eight children, including Maj.-Gen. Russell Mortimer Luckock.

== Writings ==
Luckock authored the following works:

- Tables of Stone (1867)
- Studies in the History of the Prayer Book (1881)
- An Appeal to the Church not to withdraw her Clergy from Universities (1882)
- Footprints of the Son of Man as traced by St. Mark (1884)
- The Bishops in the Tower
- After Death, the State of the Faithful Dead and their Relationship to the Living (1887)
- The Divine Liturgy, being The Order for Holy Communion, historically, doctrinally, and devotionally set forth (1889)
- The Intermediate State between Death and Judgment (1890)
- John Wesley's Churchmanship (1891)
- Who are Wesley's Heirs? (1892)
- The Church in Scotland (1893)
- History of Marriage, Jewish and Christian, with especial Reference to its Indissolubility and certain forbidden Degrees (1894)
- Footprints of the Apostles as traced by St. Luke in the Acts (2 vols., 1897)
- Four Qualifications for a Good Preacher (1897)
- The Characteristics of the Four Gospels (1900)
- Beautiful Life of an Ideal Priest; or, Reminiscences of Thomas Thellusson Carter (1902)
- Life and Works of Dr. Johnson (1902)
- Spiritual Difficulties in the Bible and Prayer Book: Helps to their Solution (1905)
- Eucharistic Sacrifice and Intercession for the Departed (1907)

Luckock also edited James Russell Woodford's Great Commission: Twelve Addresses on the Ordinal (London, 1886) and Sermons (2 vols., 1887).
