= Henry Yorke (priest) =

Henry Reginald Yorke (30 October 1803 – 26 September 1871) was Archdeacon of Huntington from 22 March 1856 to 16 March 1870.

The son of Joseph Sydney Yorke, he was born in Bursledon, educated at Harrow School and St John's College, Cambridge, and ordained in 1827. He held incumbencies at Aspenden and Wimpole; was a JP for Cambridgeshire; and a Canon at Ely Cathedral from 1859 until his death; he was granted, with his brother's succession to the peerage (in 1834), the style and precedence of the younger son of an earl.

His brother (Charles Yorke, 4th Earl of Hardwicke) was a British naval commander and Conservative politician; and his brother-in-law — Robert Cooper Lee Bevan — an eminent banker. His son Horatio Arthur Yorke was Chief Inspector for Railways from 1900 to 1913.
