= Russell Mortimer Luckock =

British Army officer

Major-General Russell Mortimer Luckock CB CMG DSO
- Born: 27 November 1877
- Died: 1950 (aged 72–73)
- Relatives: Herbert Mortimer Luckock (father)
- Military career
- Allegiance: United Kingdom
- Branch: British Army
- Service years: 1900–1938
- Rank: Major-General
- Service number: 921
- Commands: 54th (East Anglian) Infantry Division; 163rd Brigade; Small Arms School, India
- Conflicts: Second Boer War; First World War
- Awards: Companion of the Order of the Bath; Companion of the Order of St Michael and St George; Distinguished Service Order

Major-General Russell Mortimer Luckock, CB, CMG, DSO (27 November 1877 – 1950) was a British Army officer who served as colonel of the King's Own Royal Regiment (Lancaster).

== Military career ==
Mortimer Luckock, the son of the Rev. Herbert Mortimer Luckock, was commissioned as a second lieutenant in the King's Own Royal Regiment (Lancaster) on 17 February 1900, and shortly thereafter left for South Africa to serve in the Second Boer War. He took part in operations in the Orange Free State from April to June 1900, then in the Transvaal, including the defense of Vryheid in December 1900. Promotion to lieutenant came while he served in South Africa, on 21 July 1900, and he received the Queen's South Africa Medal with three clasps. After the war had ended in June 1902, he returned home with the SS Kinfauns Castle, leaving Cape Town in early August 1902.

He was promoted to captain on 22 January 1907.

Luckock later served in the First World War. He was promoted to major in September 1915.

He went on to become Commandant of the Small Arms School in India in February 1922, commander of the 163rd Brigade on 13 June 1926 and Brigadier on the General Staff at Southern Command in October 1928. After that he became General Officer Commander 54th (East Anglian) Infantry Division in September 1934. He also served as colonel of the King's Own Royal Regiment (Lancaster) (1945–47).

Military offices
Preceded by Francis Marshall	GOC 54th (East Anglian) Infantry Division; 1934–1938	Succeeded by John Priestman
Honorary titles
Preceded by Oswald Cuthbert Borrett	Colonel of the King's Own Royal Regiment (Lancaster); 1945–1947	Succeeded by John Herbert Hardy
