= HMS Vestal (1779) =

Enterprise-class Royal Navy frigate

History

Great Britain
- Name: HMS Vestal
- Ordered: 18 March 1778
- Builder: Robert & John Batson, Limehouse
- Laid down: 1 May 1778
- Launched: 24 December 1779
- Completed: 25 February 1780 (at Deptford Dockyard)
- Commissioned: November 1779
- Honours and awards: Naval General Service Medal with clasp "Egypt"
- Fate: Sold February 1816

General characteristics
- Class & type: 28-gun Enterprise-class sixth-rate frigate
- Tons burthen: 601 35/94 (bm)
- Length: 120 ft 6 in (36.73 m) (overall); 99 ft 6 in (30.33 m) (keel)
- Beam: 33 ft 8 1/2 in (10.3 m)
- Depth of hold: 11 ft 0.5 in (3.366 m)
- Sail plan: Full-rigged ship
- Complement: 200 officers and men
- Armament: Upper deck: 24 × 9-pounder guns; QD: 4 × 6-pounder guns + 4 × 18-pounder carronades; Fc: 2 × 18-pounder carronades; 12 × swivel guns

HMS Vestal was a 28-gun Enterprise-class sixth-rate frigate of the Royal Navy.

== American Revolutionary War ==
Vestal was first commissioned in November 1779 under the command of Captain George Keppel.

On 3 September 1780, she captured Mercury which was transporting Henry Laurens, the United States' minister to Holland.

In 1782, Vestal took part in the capture of the 28-gun French ship Aigle. Aigle was sailing in company with the 32-gun Gloire, and on 12 September, chased and captured the 14-gun brig HMS Racoon. Later in the day, the French frigates were spotted by a squadron comprising Vetsal, the 64-gun HMS Lion the 50-gun Warwick and the 14-gun Bonnetta. The two French frigates fled and on 13 September, attempted to escape in the shallow waters around the Delaware where, despite the danger, the British followed. The Gloire, being of a lesser draught, got away but Aigle ran aground the next day. Surrounded by British ships and unable to return fire, Aigle struck her colours.

On 15 March 1783, the Vestal along with British frigates Astraea and Duc de Chartres captured the Massachusetts letter of marque the Julius Caesar. Julius Caesar was a privateer of eighteen 9-pounder guns and carried a crew of 100 men under the command of Captain Thomas Benson, of Salem. Her captors sent Julius Caesar to New York City where the Vice admiralty court condemned her. The Vestal also captured the ship Tyger, taken to the Court of Vice-Admiralty in Bermuda.

== French Revolutionary Wars ==
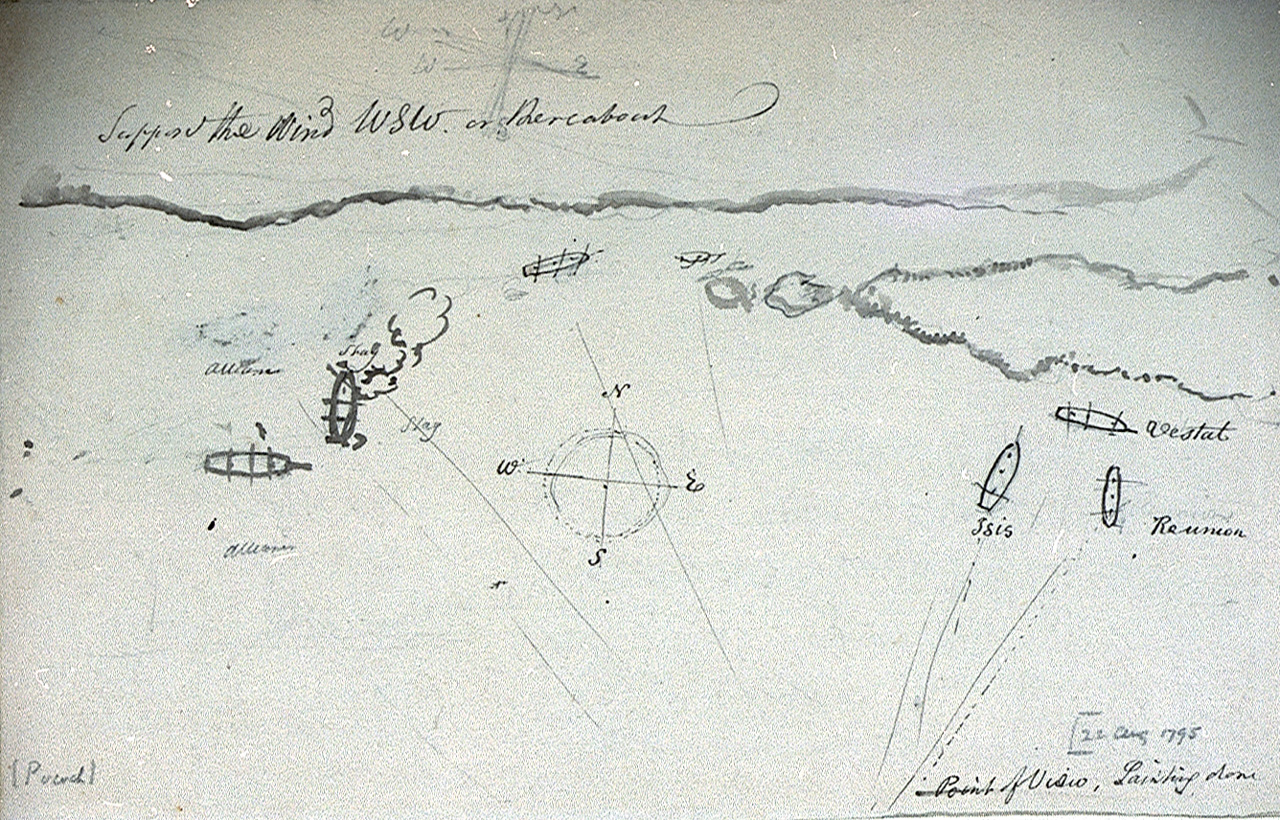
Battle of Egero, 22 August 1795. Plan of the engagement between Isis, Reunion, Stag and Vestal and the Dutch frigate Alliante,

Vestal took part in the action of 22 August 1795 between British and Dutch frigate squadrons off the Norwegian coast.

On 14 April 1797, Vestal, under the command of Captain Charles White, captured the French privateer schooner Voltiguer, formerly the lugger Venguer, some seven leagues off Flamborough Head. Voltiguer was armed with eight 3-pounder guns and eight swivel guns, and had a crew of 40 men, 14 of whom were away on prizes. She was 12 days out of Calais and had captured a brig and two sloops. White took Voltiguer into the Humber.

Next, Vestal captured Jalouse at about 5a.m. on 13 May near Elsinor after a chase of about nine hours and running about 84 hours. For an hour and a half during the chase, Jalouse fired her stern chasers (two long 12-pounder guns). White was able to bring Vestal alongside Jalouse and fired three broadsides before she struck, having suffered great damage to her masts and rigging. At the time of capture, Jalouse had 16 guns, though she was pierced for 20, and had shifted some guns to the vacant ports. The armament consisted of twelve "very long 12-pounders", and four 6-pounder guns. Her commander, "C. Plucket", had a crew of 153 men, two of whom were killed and five of whom were wounded. Vestal suffered no casualties. Vestal brought Jalouse into the Humber.

Because Vestal served in the navy's Egyptian campaign (8 March to 2 September 1801), her officers and crew qualified for the clasp "Egypt" to the Naval General Service Medal that the Admiralty authorized in 1850 to all surviving claimants. (Note: A first-class share of the prize money awarded in April 1823 was worth £34 2s 4d; a fifth-class share, that of a seaman, was worth 3s 11½d. The amount was small as the total had to be shared between 79 vessels and the entire army contingent.)

== Notes and citations ==
Notes

Citations
