= HMS Isis (1774) =

Frigate of the Royal Navy

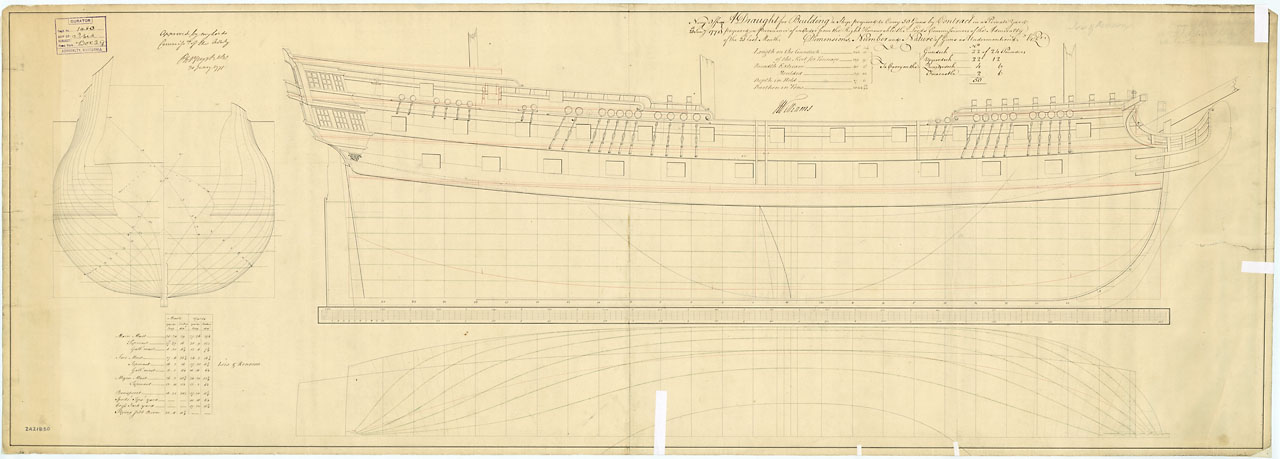
- Drawing showing the body plan with stern decoration and name on the counter, sheer lines with inboard profile and figurehead, and longitudinal half-breadth for the Isis , 1774

History

Great Britain
- Name: HMS Isis
- Ordered: 25 December 1770
- Builder: John Henniker & Co, Chatham
- Laid down: December 1772
- Launched: 19 November 1774
- Completed: February 1776
- Fate: Broken up in September 1810

General characteristics
- Class & type: 50-gun Portland-class fourth-rate
- Tons burthen: 1,050 (bm)
- Length: 146 ft (45 m)
- Beam: 40 ft 7.5 in (12.383 m)
- Depth of hold: 17 ft 6 in (5.33 m)
- Propulsion: Sails
- Sail plan: Full-rigged ship
- Complement: 350
- Armament: Lower deck: 22 × 24-pounder guns; Upper deck: 22 × 12-pounder guns; QD:4 × 6-pounder guns; Fc:2 × 6-pounder guns

HMS Isis was a 50-gun Portland-class fourth-rate ship of the line of the Royal Navy. She saw service during the American War of Independence and the French Revolutionary and Napoleonic Wars. She was built in 1774 on the River Medway and commissioned under Captain Charles Douglas in 1776, at which time he sailed with a squadron for the relief of Quebec. HMS isis remained on the North America station forming part of the convoy escorting transport vessels carring army supplies to troops involved with the capture of Philadelphia in 1777. They were delayed by bad weather from passing the Capes of Virginia into the Delaware River until 4th December. Isis then assisted HMS Somerset in the bombardment of Fort Miffin from the river. By the December Howe had ordered Isis to New York fir a new main mast and repairs.

She was involved in the Nore mutiny and fought at the Battle of Cuddalore (1783) and the Battle of Camperdown (1797). The ship was also engaged in the action of 22 August 1795, off Norway, against a Dutch squadron. She then served as the flagship of Vice-Admiral Sir Andrew Mitchell during the 1799 Anglo-Russian invasion of Holland. One of her early midshipmen was Robert Faulknor, the younger. She fought in the Battle of Copenhagen in 1801 under Captain James Walker. 10 May, 1802 she arrived at Gibraltar with HRH Duke of Kent, the (new?) Governor of Gibraltar. She was badly damaged by a hurricane during the Peace of Amiens on crossing the Atlantic to be Vice Admiral Gambier's flagship in Newfoundland, before going on to further service in Newfoundland, the Caribbean, and the North Sea. She was broken up in September 1810.

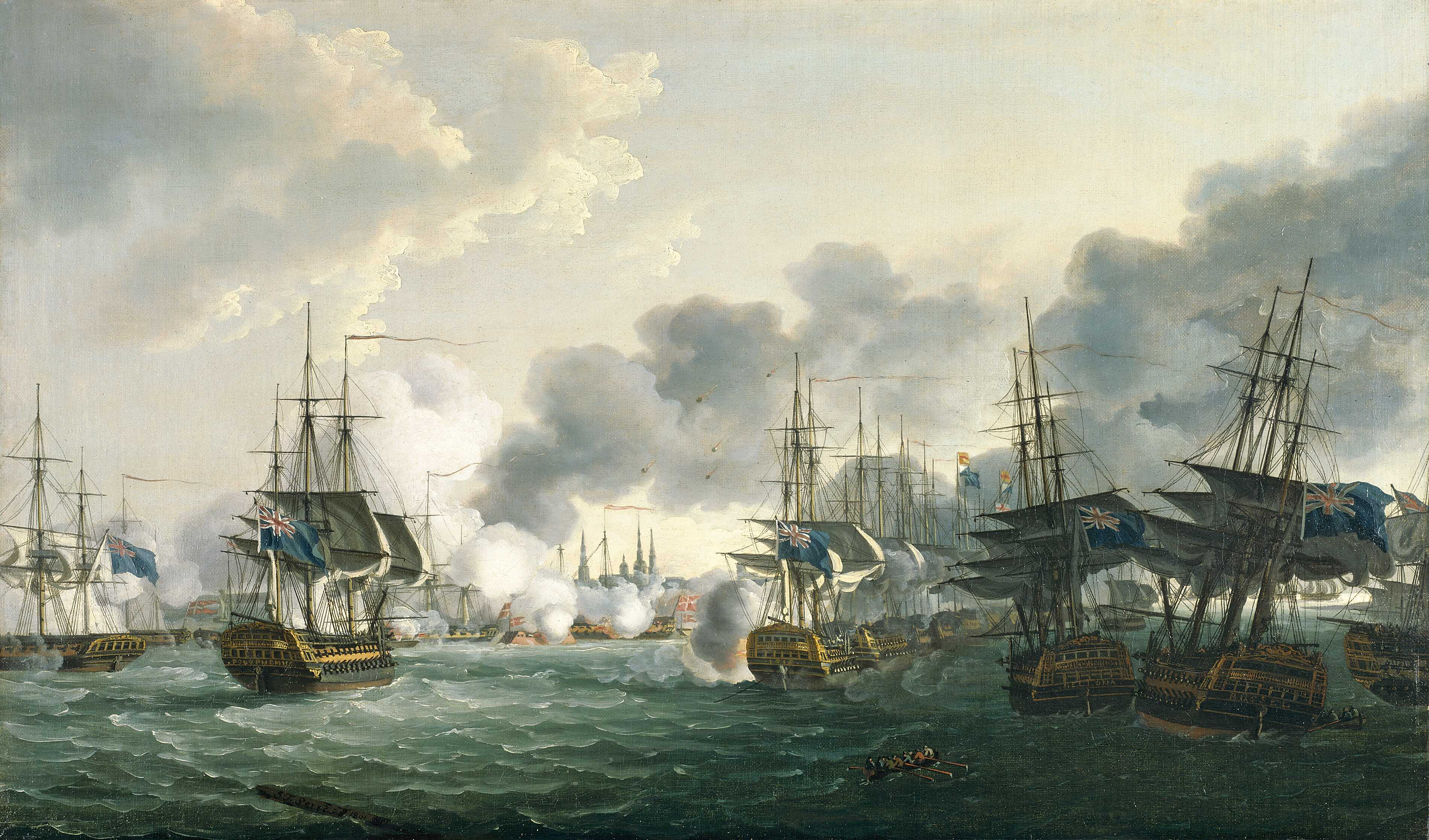
Isis at Copenhagen, 1801
