= List of baronetcies in the Baronetage of Great Britain =

Peerages and baronetcies of Britain and Ireland
Extant	All
Dukes	Dukedoms
Marquesses	Marquessates
Earls	Earldoms
Viscounts	Viscountcies
Barons	Baronies
Baronets	Baronetcies
En, Ire, NS, GB, UK (extinct)

This is a list of baronetcies in the Baronetage of Great Britain. There were first created in 1707, and was replaced by the Baronetage of the United Kingdom in 1801.

== A ==
Title	Date of creation	Surname	Current status	Notes
à Court, later Holmes à Court of Heytesbury	4 July 1795	à Court, Holmes à Court	extant	second Baronet created Baron Heytesbury in 1828
Abercrombie of Edinburgh	1709	Abercrombie	extinct 1724	
Affleck of Dalham Hall	1782	Affleck	extinct 1939	
Alleyne of Four Hills	1769	Alleyne	extant	
Amcotts of Kettlethorp	1796	Amcotts, Amcotts-Ingilby	extinct	second Baronet also succeeded to the Ingleby Baronetcy of Ripley in 1815
Anderson of Mill Hill	1798	Anderson	extinct 1813	
André of Southampton	1781	André	extinct 1802	
Andrews of Shaw Place	1766	Andrews	extinct 1822	
Anstruther of Fort William	1798	Anstruther, Carmichael-Anstruther	extinct 1980	merged with Baronet Anstruther of Anstruther in 1808.
Apreece of Washingley	1782	Apreece	extinct 1842	
Armytage of Kirklees	1738	Armytage	extant	
Asgill of London	1761	Asgill	extinct 1823	
Aubrey-Fletcher of Clea	1782	Fletcher, Aubrey-Fletcher	extant	
Austen of Derehams	1714	Austen	extinct 1742	

== B ==
Title	Date of creation	Surname	Current status	Notes
Baker, later Baker-Wilbraham of Loventor	19 September 1776	Baker, Baker-Wilbraham	extant	
Baker, later Sherston-Baker of Dunstable House	14 May 1796	Baker, Sherston-Baker	extant	
Banks of Revesby Abbey	1781	Banks	extinct 1820	
Baring of the City of London	29 May 1793	Baring	extant	third Baronet created Baron Northbrook in 1866; second Baron created Earl of Northbrook in 1876, which title became extinct in 1929
Barker of Bushbridge	1781	Barker	extinct 1789	
Barrow, later Crawley-Boevey of Highgrove	22 January 1784	Barrow, Crawley-Boevey	extant	
Basset of Tehidy	24 November 1779	Basset	extinct 1835	first Baronet created Baron de Dunstanville in 1796
Bastard of Killey	September 1779	Bastard	extinct 1782	
Bayntun-Rolt of Spye Park	7 July 1762	Bayntun-Rolt	extinct 1816	
Beauchamp-Proctor, later Proctor-Beauchamp of Langley Park	20 February 1745	Beauchamp, Beauchamp-Proctor	extant	
Beck of London	1 November 1714	Beck	extinct 1764	
Beevor of Hethel	22 January 1784	Beevor	extant	
Bellingham of Castle Bellingham	19 April 1796	Bellingham	extant	
Bernard of Nettleham	5 April 1769	Bernard	extinct 1883	
Bickerton of Upwood	29 May 1778	Bickerton	extinct 1832	
Blackwell of Sprowston Hall	16 July 1718	Blackwell	extinct 1801	
Blake of Twizel Castle	25 May 1774	Blake	extinct 1860	
Blakiston of the City of London	22 April 1763	Blakiston	extant	
Blunt of London	17 June 1720	Blunt	extant	
Boughey of Newcastle-under-Lyme	24 August 1798	Boughey	extant	
Boyd of Danson Hill	2 June 1775	Boyd	extinct 1889	
Bridges of Goodneston	19 April 1718	Bridges	extinct 1899	
Brisco of Crofton Place	1782	Brisco	dormant	eighth Baronet died 1995
Brograve of Worstead House	28 July 1791	Brograve	extinct 1828	
Bromley of East Stoke	31 October 1757	Bromley	extant	
Brown of Edinburgh	24 February 1710	Brown	extinct 1720	
Brown of Westminster	11 March 1732	Brown	extinct 1830	
Buller, later Yarde-Buller of Lupton House	13 January 1790	Buller, Yarde-Buller	extant	third Baronet created Baron Churston in 1858
Burnaby of Broughton Hall	31 October 1767	Burnaby	extinct 1914?	
Burrard of Walhampton	3 April 1769	Burrard	extinct 1965	
Burrell of Knipp	15 July 1766	Burrell	extinct 1915	second Baronet created Baron Gwydir in 1796
Burrell of Valentine House	31 May 1774	Burrell	extant	
Buswell of Clipston	5 March 1714	Buswell	extinct by 1732	
Buxton of Shadwell Lodge	25 November 1800	Buxton	extinct 1888	
Byng of Southill	15 November 1715	Byng	extant	first Baronet created Viscount Torrington in 1721

== C ==
Title	Date of creation	Surname	Current status	Notes
Cairnes of Monaghan	6 May 1708	Cairnes	extinct 1743	
Calder of Southwick	1798	Calder	extinct 1818	
Call of Whiteford	28 July 1791	Call	extinct 1903	
Callender of Westertown	1 August 1798	Callender	extinct 1812	
Calverley of Calverley	1711	Calverley, later Blackett	extinct 1728	
Carew of Bedington	11 January 1715	Carew	extinct 1762	
Cavendish of Doveridge	1755	Cavendish	extant	third Baronet succeeded as Baron Waterpark in 1807
Chad of Thursford	28 July 1791	Chad	extinct 1855	
Champneys, later Mostyn-Champneys of Orchardleigh	12 January 1767	Champneys, Mostyn-Champneys	extinct 1839	
Chaplin of the Inner Temple	19 September 1715	Chaplin	extinct 1730	
Chapman of London	1720	Chapman	extinct 1785	
Chardin of the Inner Temple	28 May 1730	Chardin	extinct 1755	
Cheere of St Margaret's, Westminster	1766	Cheere	extinct 1808	
Chetwynd of Brocton Hall	1795	Chetwynd	dormant	eighth Baronet died 2004
Clayton of Marden	13 January 1732	Clayton	extant	
Clayton of Adlington	19 May 1774	Clayton	extinct 1839	
Clerke of Duddlestone	26 October 1774	Clerke	extinct 1788	
Cocks of Dumbleton	7 October 1772	Cocks, Somers-Cocks	extant	first Baronet created Baron Somers in 1784; second Baron created Earl Somers in 1821, which title became extinct in 1887
Codrington of Dodington	21 April 1721	Codrington	extant	
Coghill of Coghill	31 August 1778	Coghill	extant	
Coghill of Richings	24 March 1781	Coghill	extinct 1785	
Colby of Kensington	21 June 1720	Colby	extinct 1729	
Colebrooke of Gatton	12 October 1759	Colebrooke	extinct 1939	fifth Baronet created Baron Colebrooke in 1906
Colquhoun of Luss	27 June 1786	Colquhoun	extant	
Cope of Brewern	1 March 1714	Cope	extinct 1821	
Copley of Sprotbrough	28 August 1778	Copley	extinct 1883	
Corbet of Moreton Corbet	27 June 1786	Corbet	extinct 1823	
Amyand, later Cornewall of Moccas Court	1764	Amyand, Cornewall	extinct 1962	
Cornish of Sharnbrook	1 February 1766	Cornish	extinct 1770	
Cradock-Hartopp of Freathby	12 May 1796	Cradock-Hartopp	extinct	
Crauford of Kilbirney	8 June 1781	Crauford	extinct 2026	
Crosse of Westminster	13 July 1713	Crosse	extinct 1762	
Cunliffe of Liverpool	26 March 1759	Cunliffe	extant	
Curtis of Gatcombe	10 September 1794	Curtis	extinct 1954	

== D ==
Title	Date of creation	Surname	Current status	Notes
D'Aeth of Knowlton	16 July 1716	D'Aeth	extinct 1808	
Dallas of Harley Street	31 July 1798	Dallas	extinct 1918	
Dalling of Burwood	11 March 1783	Dalling	extinct 1864	
Dalrymple-Hay of Park	27 April 1798	Dalrymple-Hay	extant	
Danvers of Swithland	4 July 1746	Danvers	extinct 1796	
Darell of Richmond Hall	12 May 1795	Darell	extant	
Dashwood of Kirtlington	16 September 1684	Dashwood	extant	also Baron le Despencer from 1763 to 1781
Decker of London	20 July 1716	Decker	extinct 1749	
Delaval of Ford	1 July 1761	Delaval	extinct 1808	first Baronet created Baron Delaval in 1783 and 1786
De Neufville of Frankfort	18 March 1709	De Neufville	extinct	
Denis of St Mary's	28 October 1767	Denis	extinct 1778	
Desbouverie, later Pleydell-Bouverie of St Catherine Cree	19 February 1714	Desbouverie	extant	third Baronet created Viscount Folkestone in 1747; second Viscount created Earl of Radnor in 1765
Dixwell of Coton Hall	11 June 1716	Dixwell	extinct 1757	
Douglas of Carr	23 January 1777	Douglas	extinct 1940	
Douglas of Maxwell	27 June 1786	Douglas	extinct 1969	
Drake of Prospect	28 May 1782	Drake	extinct 1789	
Drury of Overstone	16 February 1739	Drury	extinct 1759	
Dryden of Ambrosden	24 August 1733	Dryden	extant	
Dryden of Canons Ashby	2 May 1795	Dryden	extant	
Jackson, later Duckett of Hartham House	21 June 1791	Jackson, Duckett	extinct 1902	
King, later Duckworth-King of Bellevue	18 July 1792	King, Duckworth-King	extinct 1972	
Duncan of Marylebone	9 August 1764	Duncan	extinct 1774	
Dundas of Kerse	16 November 1762	Dundas	extant	second Baronet created Baron Dundas in 1794; second Baronet created Earl of Zetland in 1838; third Earl created Marquess of Zetland in 1892
Duntze of Tiverton	1774	Duntze	dormant	sixth Baronet died 1985
Durrant of Scottow	22 January 1784	Durrant	extant	
Dutry of London	19 June 1716	Dutry	extinct 1728	

== E ==
Title	Date of creation	Surname	Current status	Notes
East of Hall Place	5 June 1766	East	extinct 1828	
Eden of Maryland	19 October 1776	Eden	extant	fourth Baronet succeeded to the Eden Baronetcy of West Auckland in 1844; ninth/seventh Baronet created a life peer as Baron Eden of Winton in 1983
Edmonstone of Duntreath	20 May 1774	Edmonstone	extant	
Elford of Bickham	26 November 1800	Elford	extinct 1837	
Elliott of Peebles	25 July 1778	Elliott	extinct 1786	
Elton of Bristol	31 October 1717	Elton	extant	
Elwill of Exeter	25 August 1709	Elwill	extinct 1778	
Erskine of Torrie	28 July 1791	Erskine	extinct 1836	
Etherington of Kingston-upon-Hull	22 November 1775	Etherington	extinct 1819	
Evelyn of Wotton	6 August 1713	Evelyn	extinct 1848	
Fermor, later Eversfield of Welches	4 May 1725	Fermor, Eversfield	extinct 1784	
Eyles, later Eyles-Stiles of London	1 December 1714	Eyles, Eyles-Stiles	extinct 1768	

== F ==
Title	Date of creation	Surname	Current status	Notes
Farmer of Mount Pleasant	19 January 1780	Farmer	extinct 1913	
Farnaby of Keppington	21 July 1726	Farnaby, Farnaby-Radcliffe	extinct 1859	
Farquhar of London	1 March 1796	Farquhar	extant	
Fellows of Carshalton	20 January 1719	Fellows	extinct 1724	
Fetherstonhaugh of Fetherstonhaugh	3 January 1747	Fetherstonhaugh	extinct 1846	
ffolkes of Hillington	26 May 1774	ffolkes	extant	
Fitzherbert of Tissington	22 January 1784	Fitzherbert	extant	
Fleming of Brompton Park	22 April 1763	Fleming	extinct 1763	
Vane-Fletcher, later Fletcher-Vane of Hutton	27 June 1786	Vane-Fletcher, Fletcher-Vane	extinct 1934	
Fludyer of Lee Place	14 November 1759	Fludyer	extinct 1922	
Foley of Thorpe Lee	1 July 1767	Foley	extinct 1782	
Ford, later St Clair-Ford of Ember Court	22 February 1793	Ford, St Clair-Ford	extant	
Frederick of Burwood House	10 June 1723	Frederick	extant	
Freke of West Bilney	4 June 1713	Freke	extinct 1764	
Fryer of the City of London	13 December 1714	Fryer	extinct 1726	
Furnese of Waldershare	27 June 1707	Furnese	extinct 1735	

== G ==
Title	Date of creation	Surname	Current status	Notes
Gardner of the Navy	9 September 1794	Gardner	extinct or dormant 1883	first Baronet created Baron Gardner in 1800
Geary of Oxenheath	17 August 1782	Geary	extinct	extinct on the death of the 5th Baronet in 1944
Gibbons of Stanwell Place	21 April 1752	Gibbons	extant	
Gideon of Belvedere	21 May 1759	Gideon	extinct 1824	first Baronet created Baron Eardley in 1789
Glyn of Ewell	29 September 1759	Glyn	extant	inherited by fourth Glyn Baronet of Gaunt's House in 1942
Glyn of Gaunt's House	22 November 1800	Glyn	extant	fourth Baronet succeeded to Glyn Baronetcy of Ewell in 1942
Gooch of Benacre Hall	4 November 1746	Gooch	extant	
Goodere, later Dineley-Goodere of Burhope	5 December 1707	Goodere, Dineley-Goodere	extinct 1809	
Gordon of Newark-upon-Trent	21 August 1764	Gordon	extinct 1831	
Gough of Edgbaston	1728	Gough, Gough-Calthorpe	extinct 1997	second Baronet created Baron Calthorpe in 1796
Gamon, later Grace of Grace Castle	11 May 1795	Gamon, Grace	extinct 1977	
Graham of Netherby	15 January 1783	Graham	extant	
Green of Marass	27 June 1786	Green	extinct 1826	
Grey of Howick	11 January 1746	Grey	extant	second Baronet created Earl Grey in 1806 (two years before he succeeded to the baronetcy)
Guise of Highnam Court	9 December 1783	Guise	extant	
Gunning of Elvetham	3 September 1778	Gunning	extant	

== H ==
Title	Date of creation	Surname	Current status	Notes
Hamilton of Trebinshun	24 August 1776	Hamilton	extinct 2008	
Hamlyn, later Hamlyn-Williams of Clovelly	7 July 1795	Hamlyn, Hamlyn-Williams	extinct 1861	
Hamond, later Hamond-graeme of Holly Grove	18 December 1783	Hamond, later Hamond-Graeme	extinct 1969	
Hanmer of Hanmer	21 May 1774	Hanmer	extant	
Harbord, later Harbord-Hamond of Gunton	22 March 1746	Harbord, Harbord-Hamond	extant	second Baronet created Baron Suffield in 1786
Harland of Sproughton	13 March 1771	Harland	extinct 1848	
Hawkins of Kelston	25 July 1778	Hawkins	extant	
Hawkins of Trewithan	28 July 1791	hawkins	extinct 1829	
Hawley of Leybourne	1795	Hawley	extinct 2015	
Hayes of Westminster	6 February 1797	Hayes	extinct 1896	
Heathcote, later Heathcote-Drummond-Willoughby of London	17 January 1733	Heathcote, Heathcote-Drummond-Willoughby	extant	fifth Baronet created Baron Aveland in 1856, which title became extinct in 1983; second Baron succeeded as Baron Willoughby de Eresby in 1888 and created Earl of Ancaster in 1892, the latter title which became extinct in 1983; barony of Willoughby de Eresby separated from the Baronetcy in 1983
Heathcote of Hursley	16 August 1733	Heathcote	extant	
Major, later Henniker-Major of Worlingworth Hall	1765	Major, Henniker-Major	extant	second Baronet created Baron Henniker in 1800; baronetcy unproven (ninth baronet died 2004) – under review
Heron of Newark	25 August 1778	Heron	extinct 1854	
Hesketh, later Fermor-Hesketh of Rufford	5 May 1761	Hesketh, Fermor-Hesketh	extant	eighth Baronet created Baron Hesketh in 1935
Hill, later Clegg-Hill of Hawkstone	1727	Hill, Clegg-Hill	extant	fourth Baronet succeeded as Viscount Hill in 1842
Hippisley of Warfield	10 May 1796	Hippisley	extinct 1867	
Hoare of Barn Elms	27 June 1786	Hoare	extant	
Holland of Wittenham	27 November 1800	Holland	extinct 1811	
Hood of Catherington	1778	Hood	extant	first Baronet created Viscount Hood in 1796
Hort of Castle Strange	1767	Hort	extant	
Horton of Chadderton	22 January 1764	Horton	extinct 1821	
Hughes of East Bergholt	17 July 1773	Hughes	extant	
Hulse of Lincoln's Inn Fields	7 February 1739	Hulse	extant	
Hume of Wormleybury	4 April 1769	Hume	extinct 1838	
Humphreys of London	30 November 1714	Humphreys	extinct 1737	
Hunter-Blair of Dunskey	1786	Hunter-Blair	unproven	eighth Baronet died 2006

== I ==
Title	Date of creation	Surname	Current status	Notes
Ibbetson of Leeds	1748	Ibbetson, Selwin-Ibbetson	extinct 1902	seventh Baronet created Baron Rookwood in 1892
Ingilby of Kettlethorpe	1781	Ingilby, Amcotts-Ingilby	extinct 1854	

== J ==
Title	Date of creation	Surname	Current status	Notes
James of Eltham	27 August 1778	James	extinct 1792	
James of Langley Hall	28 July 1791	James	extant	second Baronet created Baron Northbourne in 1884
Janssen of Wimbledon	11 March 1715	Janssen	extinct 1777	
Jebb of Trent Place	4 September 1778	Jebb	extinct 1787	
Lombe, later Jodrell of Sall Park	22 January 1784	Lombe, Jodrell	extinct 1929	
Johnson of New York	27 November 1755	Johnson	extant	
Jones of Ramsbury	27 May 1774	Jones	extinct 1791	

== K ==
Title	Date of creation	Surname	Current status	Notes
Kennaway of Hyderabad	25 February 1791	Kennaway	extant	
Kent of Fornham	16 August 1782	Kent	extinct 1848	
Kenyon, later Tyrell-Kenyon of Gredlington	28 July 1784	Kenyon, Tyrell-Kenyon	extant	first Baronet created Baron Kenyon in 1788
Kingsmill of Sidmanton	24 November 1800	Kingsmill	extinct	second baronet died 1823
Kneller of Whitton	24 May 1715	Kneller	extinct 1723	
Knightley of Fawsley	2 February 1798	Knightley	extinct 1938	
Knollys of Thame	1 April 1754	Knollys	extinct 1772	
Knowles of Lovell Hill	31 October 1765	Knowles	extant	

== L ==
Title	Date of creation	Surname	Current status	Notes
Lade of Warbleton	11 March 1731	Lade	extinct 1747	
Lade of Warbleton	17 March 1758	Lade	extinct 1838	second creation in same family
Laforey of Whitby	2 December 1789	Laforey	extinct 1835	
Lake of London	17 October 1711	Lake	extant	
Lamb of Brocket Hall	17 January 1755	Lamb	extinct 1853	second Baronet created Viscount Melbourne in 1781
Lamb of Burghfield	21 October 1795	Lamb	extinct 1948	
Lambert of London	16 February 1711	Lambert	extant	
La Roche of Over	17 September 1776	La Roche	extinct or dormant 1804	
Leigh of South Carolina	15 May 1773	Leigh	extinct c. 1870	
Leith of Burgh St Peter	1775	Leith, Leith-Buchanan	extinct 2018	dormant since sixth Baronet died 1973
Lemon of Carclew	1774	Lemon	extinct 1868	
Lippincott of Stoke Bishop	7 September 1778	Lippincott	extinct 1829	
Lloyd of Mitfield	1 April 1708	Lloyd	extinct 1750	
Lloyd of Peterwell	26 January 1763	Lloyd	extinct 1769	
Lloyd-Mostyn of Pengwern	1778	Lloyd, Lloyd-Mostyn	extant	second Baronet created Baron Mostyn in 1831; baronetcy unproven (sixth baronet died 2006)
Lovett of Liscombe House	23 October 1781	Lovett	extinct 1812	A new patent of the baronetcy was gazetted in 1808, with remainder to the first Baronet's daughters and their male issue. However, it is unclear whether this creation passed the Great Seal.
Lowther of Swillington	6 January 1715	Lowther	extinct 1763	
Lowther of Swillington	22 August 1764	Lowther	extant	second Baronet succeeded as Viscount Lowther in 1802 and created Earl of Lonsdale in 1807
Lushington of South Hill Park	26 April 1791	Lushington	extant	
Lyde of Ayot St Lawrence	13 October 1772	Lyde	extinct 1791	

== M ==
Title	Date of creation	Surname	Current status	Notes
MacGregor of MacGregor	1795	MacGregor	extant	
Mackworth of The Gnoll	16 September 1776	Mackworth	extant	
Macpherson of Calcutta	27 August 1786	Macpherson	extinct 1821	
Malet of Wilbury	24 February 1791	Malet	extant	
Mann of Linton Hall	3 March 1755	Mann	extinct 1814	
Martin of Lockynge	28 July 1791	Martin	extinct 1910	
Mawbey of Botleys	30 July 1765	Mawbey	extinct 1817	
Mayne of Marston Mortaine	22 April 1763	Mayne	extinct 1794	first Baronet created Baron Newhaven in 1776
Mildmay of Moulsham	5 February 1765	Mildmay	extinct 1771	
Miller of Glenlee	3 March 1788	Miller	extant	
Milman of Levaton-in-Woodland	28 November 1800	Milman	extant	
Milner of Nun-Appleton Hall	26 February 1717	Milner	extant	
Montgomery of Magbie Hill	28 May 1774	Montgomery	extinct 1831	
Moore of Jamaica	28 January 1764	Moore	extinct 1780	
Moore of the Navy	4 March 1766	Moore	extinct 1779	
Gould, later Morgan of Tredegar	15 November 1792	Gould, Morgan	extinct 1962	Viscount Tredegar
Morshead of Trenant Park	22 January 1784	Morshead	extinct 1905	
Mosley of Rolleston	18 June 1720	Mosley	extinct 1779	
Mosley of Ancoats	1781	Mosley	dormant	sixth Baronet died 1980 – see also the Baron Ravensdale

== N ==
Title	Date of creation	Surname	Current status	Notes
Neave of Dagnam Park	13 May 1795	Neave	extant	
Middleton, later Noel of the Navy	23 October 1781	Middleton, Noel	extant	first Baronet created Baron Barham in 1805; third Baron created Earl of Gainsborough in 1841

== O ==
Title	Date of creation	Surname	Current status	Notes
Oakeley of Shrewsbury	5 June 1790	Oakeley	extant	
O'Carroll of Denton	1712	O'Carroll	extinct or dormant 1835	
Onslow of Althain	30 October 1797	Onslow	extant	
Orde later Campbell-Orde of Morpeth	9 August 1790	Orde, Campbell-Orde	extant	
Gibbes, later Osborne-Gibbes of Springhead	30 May 1774	Gibbes, Osborne-Gibbes	extinct 1940	
Oughton of Tetchbrook	27 August 1718	Oughton	extinct 1736	

== P-Q ==
Title	Date of creation	Surname	Current status	Notes
Page of Greenwich	3 December 1714	Page	extinct 1775	
Turner, later Page-Turner of Amroseden	24 August 1733	Turner, Page-Turner	extant	Dryden baronets
Palk of Haldon House	19 June 1782	Palk	extinct 1945	fourth Baronet created Baron Holden in 1880, which title became extinct in 1939
Palliser of The Vache	6 August 1773	Palliser	extinct 1868	
Palmer of Wanlip	28 July 1791	Palmer	extant	
Parker of Bassingbourn	13 January 1783	Parker	extinct 1869	
Parker of Harburn	24 July 1797	Parker	extinct 1903	
Pasley of Craig	1794	Pasley	dormant	
Paul of Rodborough	3 September 1763	Paul	extinct 1820	
Paul of Paulville	20 January 1794	Paul	extinct 1961	
Payne of St Christophers	31 October 1737	Payne	extinct 1801	Title assumed until c. 1900
Peachey of Petworth	1736	Peachey	extinct	fourth baronet created Baron Selsey in 1794
Pechell of Paglesham	1 March 1797	Pechell	extinct 1984	
Peel of Drayton Manor	29 November 1800	Peel	extant	inherited by the Earl Peel in 1942
Pellew of the Navy	1796	Pellew	extant	first Baronet created Viscount Exmouth in 1816
Pepperell of Boston	15 November 1746	Pepperell	extinct 1759	
Pepperell of Boston	9 November 1774	Pepperell	extinct 1816	
Pepys of Upper Brook Street	1784	Pepys, Leslie	extant	inherited by the Earl of Cottenham in 1849; baronetcy unproven (11th baronet died 2000)
Perrott of Plumstead	1716	Perrott	extinct	fifth Baronet created a Baronet of Plumstead in the Baronetage of the United Kingdom in 1911; Under review
Peyton of Doddington	18 September 1776	Peyton	extinct 1962	
Pigot of Patshull	5 December 1764	Pigot	extant	the 1st Baronet was created Baron Pigot in 1766
Pleydell of Coleshill	15 June 1732	Pleydell	extinct 1768	
Pole of Wolverton	28 July 1791	Pole	extant	
Pollen of Redenham	1795	Pollen	extant	unproven (seventh Baronet died 2003) – under review
Poore of Rushall	8 July 1795	Poore	extant	
Prescott of Theobalds Park	9 December 1794	Prescott	extinct 1959	
Price of Jamaica	13 August 1768	Price	extinct 1788	
Pringle of Pall Mall	5 June 1766	Pringle	extinct 1782	
Quin, later Wyndham-Quin of Adare	8 June 1781	Quin, Wyndham-Quin	extinct 2011	first Baronet created Earl of Dunraven and Mount-Earl in 1822

== R ==
Title	Date of creation	Surname	Current status	Notes
Rich of Rose Hall	28 July 1791	Rich	dormant 1983	
Riddell of Ardnamurchan	2 September 1778	Riddell	extinct 1907	
White, later Ridley of Blagdon	6 May 1756	White, Ridley	extant	fifth Baronet created Viscount Ridley in 1900
Robinson	10 March 1731	Robinson	extinct 1883	Baron Rokeby
Rodney of Alresford	22 January 1764	Rodney	extant	first Baronet created Baron Rodney in 1782
Rowley of Tendring Hall	27 June 1786	Rowley	extant	
Rumbold of Wood Hall	27 March 1779	Rumbold	extant	
Rycroft of Calton	22 January 1784	Rycroft	extant	

== S ==
Title	Date of creation	Surname	Current status	Notes
St John, now St John-Mildmay of Farley	9 October 1772	St John, St John-Mildmay	extant	
St John of Longthorpe	10 September 1715	St John	extinct 1756	
Salusbury of Llanwern	4 May 1795	Salusbury	extinct 1868	
Sanderson of Greenwich	19 July 1720	Sanderson	extinct 1760	
Sanderson of London	6 December 1794	Sanderson	extinct 1798	
Saxton of Circourt	26 July 1794	Saxton	extinct 1838	
Sheffield of Normanby	1 March 1755	Sheffield	extant	
Shirley of Oat Hall	27 June 1786	Shirley	extinct 1815	
Shore of Heathcote	27 October 1792	Shore	extinct 1981	first Baronet created Baron Teignmouth in 1798
Sinclair of Ulbster	14 February 1786	Sinclair	extant	fourth Baronet created Viscount Thurso in 1952
Farrell-Skeffington, later Skeffington of Skeffington	27 June 1786	Farrell-Skeffington, Skeffington	extinct 1850	
Sloane of Chelsea	3 April 1716	Sloane	extinct 1753	
Smith of Long Ashton	27 January 1763	Smith	extinct 1849	
Smith-Burges of East Ham	4 May 1793	Smith-Burges	extinct 1803	
Smith, now Smith-Dodsworth of Newland Park	22 January 1784	Smith, Smith-Dodsworth	extant	
Smith, now Smith-Marriott of Sydling St Nicholas	1 June 1774	Smith, Smith-Marriott	extant	
Smyth of Isfield	2 December 1714	Smyth	extinct 1811	
Stephens of Horsford	13 March 1795	Stephens	extinct 1809	
Stirling of Mansfield	19 July 1792	Stirling	extinct 1843	
Stirling of Faskine	14 December 1800	Stirling	extinct 1934	
Sutton of Norwood Park	14 October 1772	Sutton	extant	
Sykes of Basildon	8 June 1781	Sykes	extant	
Sykes of Sledmere	20 March 1783	Sykes	extant	
Symons of The Mynde	23 May 1774	Symons	extinct 1796	

== T ==
Title	Date of creation	Surname	Current status	Notes
Tapps, now Tapps-Gervis-Meyrick of Hinton Admiral	28 July 1791	Tapps, Tapps-Gervis-Meyrick	extant	
Taylor of Lysson Hall	1 September 1778	taylor	extinct 1815	
Tench of Low Leyton	8 August 1715	Tench	extinct 1737	
Thomas of Yapton	6 September 1766	Thomas	extinct 1972	
Thompson of Virkees	23 June 1797	Thompson	extinct 1868	
Thorold of Harmeston	9 September 1709	Thorold	extinct 1738	
Thorold of Harmeston	24 March 1741	Thorold	extinct 1764	
Tollemache of Hanby Hall	12 January 1793	Tollemache	extant	
Troubridge of Plymouth	30 November 1799	Troubridge	extant	
Turner of Warham	27 April 1727	Turner	extinct 1780	
Turner of Kirkleatham	8 May 1772	Turner	extinct 1810	
Turton of Starborough Castle, Surrey	13 May 1796	Turton	extinct 13 April 1854	

== V ==
Title	Date of creation	Surname	Current status	Notes
Vanden-Bempde-Johnstone of Hackness Hall	6 July 1795	Vanden-Bempde	extant	third Baronet created Baron Derwent in 1881
Vandeput of Twickenham	7 November 1723	Vandeput	extinct 1784	
Vane, later Vane-Tempest of Long Newton	13 July 1782	Vane, Vane-Tempest	extinct 1813	
Vanneck of Putney	1751	Vanneck	dormant 1969	third Baronet created Baron Huntingfield in 1796; baronetcy dormant (seventh baronet died 1969)
Vaughan of Nannau	28 July 1791	Vaughan	extinct 1859	

== W ==
Title	Date of creation	Surname	Current status	Notes
Warren of Little Marlow	1 June 1775	Warren	extinct 1822	
Warrender of Lochend	2 June 1715	Warrender	extant	eighth Baronet created Baron Bruntisfield in 1942
Watson of Fulner	21 March 1760	Watson	extinct 1904	
Wentworth of Parlut	16 May 1795	Wentworth	extinct 1844	
Whalley-Gardiner, later Whalley-Smythe-Gardiner of Roche Court	14 January 1783	Whalley-Gardiner, later Whalley-Smythe-Gardiner	extinct 1868	
Williams of Edwinsford	30 July 1707	Williams	extinct 1745	
Williams of Clapton	4 April 1747	Williams	extinct 1784	
Williams of Bodelwyddan	24 July 1798	Williams	extinct 2018	
Willoughby of Baldon House	8 December 1794	Willoughby	extinct 1918	
Wilmot of Chaddesden	15 February 1759	Wilmot	extant	
Wilmot of Osmaston	10 October 1772	Wilmot, Wilmot-Horton	extinct 1931	
Winn, later Allanson-Winn of Little Warley	1776	Winn, Allanson-Winn	extinct 1994	first Baronet created Baron Headley in 1797; second Baron succeeded to the Winn Baronetcy of Nostel (created 1660) in 1833
Winnington of Stanford Court	1755	Winnington	extant	
Wintringham of Dover Street	1774	Wintringham	extinct 1794	
Wolff of Town Hill	1766	Wolff	extinct 1837	
Wolseley of Mount Wolseley	1745	Wolseley	extant	
Wombwell of Wombwell	1778	Wombwell	dormant	sixth Baronet died 1977 – under review
Wood of Barnsley	1784	Wood	extant	third Baronet created Viscount Halifax in 1866, third Viscount created Earl of Halifax in 1944
Woodford of Carleby	28 July 1791	Woodford	extinct 1828	
Wollaston of Loseby	1748	Wollaston	extinct 1756	
Wright of Carolside	1772	Wright	extinct 1837	
Wright of Venice	1772	Wright	extinct 1812	
Wyche of Chewton	1729	Wyche	extinct 1756	
Wynn of Bodvean	1742	Wynn	extant	third Baronet created Baron Newborough in 1776; baronetcy unproven (ninth baronet died 1998) – under review
Wynne of Lees Wood	1793	Wynne	extinct 1793	

== Y ==
Title	Date of creation	Surname	Current status	Notes
Yea of Pyrland	1759	Yea	extinct 1864	
Young of North Dean	1769	Young	extant	

== See also ==
- Baronetage of Great Britain
- List of baronetcies in the Baronetage of Ireland
- List of baronetcies in the Baronetage of Nova Scotia
- List of baronetcies in the Baronetage of the United Kingdom
- List of baronetcies in the Baronetage of England
