= List of baronetcies in the Baronetage of the United Kingdom: G =

Peerages and baronetcies of Britain and Ireland
Extant	All
Dukes	Dukedoms
Marquesses	Marquessates
Earls	Earldoms
Viscounts	Viscountcies
Barons	Baronies
Baronets	Baronetcies
En, Ire, NS, GB, UK (extinct)

This is a list of baronetcies in the Baronetage of the United Kingdom. They have been created since 1801 when they replaced the baronetages in the Baronetage of Great Britain, and Baronetage of Ireland. This list is not currently complete.

Title	Date of creation	Surname	Current status	Notes
Gabriel of Edgecombe Hall	1867	Gabriel	extinct 1891	Lord Mayor of London
Galbraith of Shanwally	1813	Galbraith	extinct 1827	
Gamble of Windlehurst	1897	Gamble	extant	
Gammans of Hornsey	1956	Gammans	extinct 1957	
Ganzoni of Ipswich	1929	Ganzoni	extinct 2005	first Baronet created Baron Belstead in 1938
Garthwaite of Durham	1919	Garthwaite	extant	
George of Park Place and St Stephen's Green	1809	George	extinct 1856	
Gibbons of Sittingbourne	1872	Gibbons	extinct 1876	Lord Mayor of London
Gibson-Craig of Carmichael	1831	Gibson-Craig	extant	fifth Baronet succeeded as Gibson-Craig-Carmichael Baronet of Keirhill (created in the Baronetage of Nova Scotia in 1702) in 1926, since when the two titles have been merged
Gibson of Great Warley	1926	Gibson	extinct 1997	
Gibson of Linconia and Faccombe	1931	Gibson	extant	
Gibson of Regent Terrace	1909	Gibson	extinct 1912	
Gilbert	1850	Gilbert	extinct ?	
Gilbey of Elsenham	1893	Gilbey	extant	
Gillett of Bassishaw Ward	1959	Gillett	extant	Lord Mayor of London
Gilmour of Liberton	1926	Gilmour	extant	third Baronet created a life peer as Baron Gilmour of Craigmillar in 1992
Gilmour of Lundin	1897	Gilmour	extant	
Gilpin of Hockliffe Grange	1876	Gilpin	extinct 1882	
Gilstrap of Fornham Park	1887	Gilstrap	extinct 1896	
Gladstone of Fasque	1846	Gladstone	extant	
Glen-Coats of Ferguslie Park	1894	Glen-Coats	extinct 1954	
Glover of Arkley	1920	Glover	extinct 1934	
Glyn of Farnborough	1934	Glyn	extinct 1960	first Baronet created Baron Glyn in 1953
Godlee of Coombe End	1912	Godlee	extinct 1925	
Goff of Goffs Oak	1936	Goff	extinct 1939	
Goldney of Bradenstoke Abbey	1880	Goldney	extinct 1974	
Goldsmid of St Johns Lodge	1841	Goldsmid	extinct 1896	
Gooch of Clewer Park	1866	Gooch	extant	unproven (fifth Baronet died 2003) - under review
Goodenough of Broadwell and Filkins	1943	Goodenough	extant	
Goodhart of Holtye	1911	Goodhart	extant	
Goodson of Waddeton Court	1922	Goodson	extant	
Goold of Old Court	1801	Goold	extant	
Gordon-Cumming of Altyre and Gordonstoun	1804	Gordon-Cumming	extant	
Gordon of Northcourt	1818	Gordon	extinct 1876	
Goschen of Beacon Lodge	1916	Goschen	extant	
Goschen of Durrington House	1927	Goschen	extinct 1945	
Gough of Goojerat	1842	Gough	extant	first Baronet created Viscount Gough in 1849
Goulding of Millicent and Roebuck Hill	1904	Goulding	dormant	third Baronet died 1982
Goulding of Wargrave Hall	1915	Goulding	extinct 1936	first Baronet created Baron Wargrave in 1922
Graaff of Tygerberg	1911	Graaff	extant	
Graham-Moon of Portman Square	1855	Graham-Moon	extant	Lord Mayor of London
Graham of Dromore	1964	Graham	extinct 2020	
Graham of Kirkstall	1808	Graham	extinct 1895	
Graham of Larbert House and Househill	1906	Graham	extant	
Grant of Forres	1924	Grant	extinct 1947	
Grant of Househill	1926	Grant	extinct 1932	
Graves-Sawle of Penrice and Barley	1836	Graves-Sawle	extinct 1932	
Gray of Tunstall Manor	1917	Gray	extant	
Grayson of Ravens Point	1922	Grayson	extant	
Green of Belsize Park	1901	Green	extinct 1959	Lord Mayor of London
Green of Milnrow	1805	Green	extinct 1831	
Green of Wakefield	1886	Green	extant	
Greenall of Walton Hall	1876	Greenall	extant	second Baronet created Baron Daresbury in 1927
Greenaway of Coombe	1933	Greenaway	extant	Lord Mayor of London
Greene of Nether Hall	1900	Greene	extinct 1966	
Greenhill-Russell of Chequers Court	1831	Greenhill-Russell	extinct 1836	
Green-Price of Norton Manor	1874	Green-Price	extant	
Greenway of Stanbridge Earls	1919	Greenway	extant	first Baronet created Baron Greenway in 1927
Greenwell of Marden Park and Greenwell	1906	Greenwell	extant	
Greenwood of Holborn	1915	Greenwood	extinct 2003	first Baronet created Viscount Greenwood in 1937
Gregory of Bristol	1931	Gregory	extinct 1952	
Grey of Fallodon	1814	Grey	extant	
Griffies-Williams of Llwyny Wormwood	1815	Griffies-Williams	extinct 1877	
Griffith of Munster Grillagh and Pencraig	1858	Griffith, Waldie-Griffith	extinct 1933	
Grimston of Westbury	1952	Grimston	extant	first Baronet created Baron Grimston of Westbury in 1964; baronetcy unproven (2nd baronet died 2003)
Grogan of Moyvore	1859	Grogan	extinct 1927	
Grotrian of Leighton Buzzard	1934	Grotrian	extant	
Grove of Fern	1874	Grove	dormant	third Baronet died 1962
Guest of Dowlais	1838	Guest	extant	second Baronet created Baron Wimborne in 1880, second Baron created Viscount Wimborne in 1918
Guinness of Ashford	1867	Guinness	extant	second Baronet created Baron Ardilaun in 1880, which title became extinct in 1915
Guinness of Iveagh	1885	Guinness	extant	first Baronet created Earl of Iveagh in 1919
Gull of Brook Street	1872	Gull	extant	
Gunston of Wickwar	1938	Gunston	extant	
Gunter of Weatherby	1901	Gunter	extinct 1980	
Guthrie of Brent Eleigh Hall	1936	Guthrie	extant	
Gwynne-Evans of Oaklands Park	1913	Gwynne-Evans, Evans-Tipping	extant	
