= Thomas baronets of Yapton (1766) =

Escutcheon of the Thomas baronets of Yapton

The Thomas baronetcy, of Yapton in the County of Sussex, was created in the Baronetage of Great Britain on 6 September 1766 for George Thomas, Governor of the Leeward Islands from 1753 to 1766, and plantation owner in Antigua.

The 3rd Baronet sat as Member of Parliament for Arundel. The 7th Baronet was a prominent chess player, British Chess Champion in 1923 and 1934. The title became extinct on his death in 1972.

== Thomas baronets, of Yapton (1766) ==
- Sir George Thomas, 1st Baronet (died 1774)
- Sir William Thomas, 2nd Baronet (died 1777)
- Sir George Thomas, 3rd Baronet (c. 1740–1815)
- Sir William Lewis George Thomas, 4th Baronet (1777–1850)
- Sir William Sidney Thomas, 5th Baronet (1807–1867)
- Sir George Sidney Meade Thomas, 6th Baronet (1847–1918)
- Sir George Alan Thomas, 7th Baronet (1881–1972), left no heir.

== Notes ==
Baronetage of Great Britain
Preceded by Andrews baronets	Thomas baronets of Yapton; 6 September 1766	Succeeded by Wolff baronets
