= Church of St Matthew, Wookey =

Church in Somerset, England

Church of St Matthew
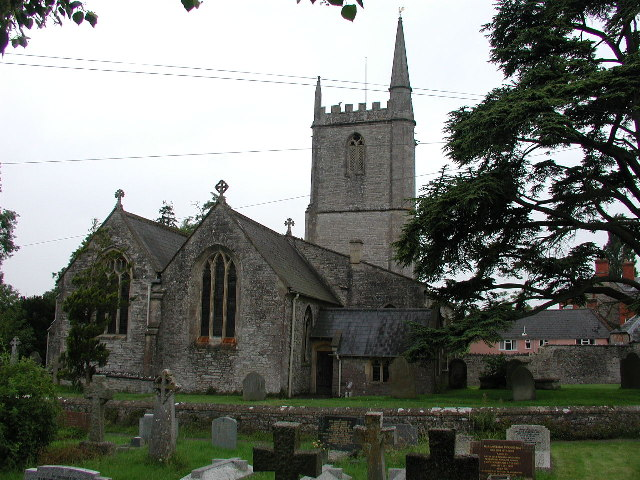

- Location within Somerset

General information
- Location: Wookey, England
- Coordinates: 51.2093°N 2.6907°W
- Completed: 12th century

The Church of St Matthew in Wookey, Somerset, England, dates from the twelfth century and is a Grade I listed building.

The church was granted to the dean of Wells by Bishop Robert, rebuilt by Bishop Reginald and assigned to the sub dean of the cathedral in 1209. The south chancel is thought to have been built to house the memorial to Thomas Clerke in 1556. The tower dates from the 15th century it held five bells until 1949 when a sixth was added. In 1906 the tower was struck by lightning.

A major restoration in the 19th century included a new roof but preserved the 15th century beams.

Beside the church stands the 19th-century Mellifont Abbey, which is named after the abbey of the same name in Ireland.

The parish is part of the benefice of Coxley with Godney, Henton and Wookey within the Shepton Mallet deanery.

== Monuments ==
In the tower, behind the organ, there is a monument to Sir Jacob Wolff, 1st Baronet who was also a Baron of the Holy Roman Empire. He and his wife resided in Mellifont Abbey (now a care home) next to the church.

== See also ==
- Grade I listed buildings in Mendip
- List of Somerset towers
- List of ecclesiastical parishes in the Diocese of Bath and Wells
