= James baronets =

There have been four baronetcies created for persons with the surname James, one in the Baronetage of England, two in the Baronetage of Great Britain and one in the Baronetage of the United Kingdom.

- James baronets of Creshall (1682)
- James baronets of Park Farm Place, Eltham (1778)
- James baronetcy of Langley Hall (1791): see Baron Northbourne
- James baronets of Dublin (1823)
