= Wookey =

Village in Somerset, England

Coordinates: 51.2094°N 2.6915°W

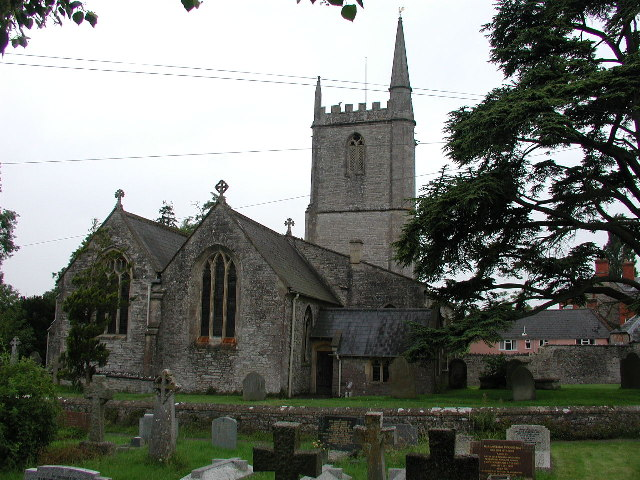
- Church of St Matthew, Wookey

- Location within Somerset
- Population: 1,311 (2011)
- OS grid reference: ST515455
- Unitary authority: Somerset Council
- Ceremonial county: Somerset
- Region: South West
- Country: England
- Sovereign state: United Kingdom
- Post town: WELLS
- Postcode district: BA5
- Dialling code: 01749
- Police: Avon and Somerset
- Fire: Devon and Somerset
- Ambulance: South Western
- UK Parliament: Wells and Mendip Hills

Wookey is a village and civil parish 2 miles (3.2 km) west of Wells, on the River Axe in Somerset, England. The parish includes the village of Henton and the nearby hamlets of Yarley and Bleadney where the River Axe travels the length of the village. There used to be a port at Bleadney on the river in the 8th century which allowed goods to be brought to within 3 miles (5 km) of Wells. Wookey is often confused with its sister village Wookey Hole (2 miles to the north), site of the Wookey Hole Caves.

== History ==
The name Wookey is thought to come from the Old English wocig, meaning an animal trap. An alternative explanation has been offered which suggests it comes from the Celtic word ogof meaning cave, possibly appearing also as Woky.

One mile north-west of Polsham, but within the parish of Wookey, are the earthwork remains of Fenny Castle, a motte and bailey castle sited on a natural hillock.

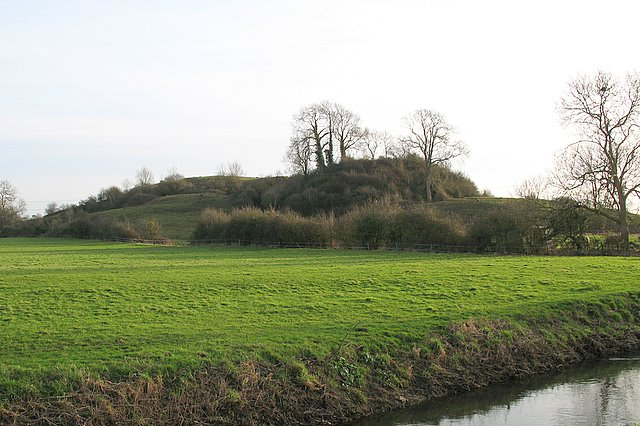
Fenny Castle

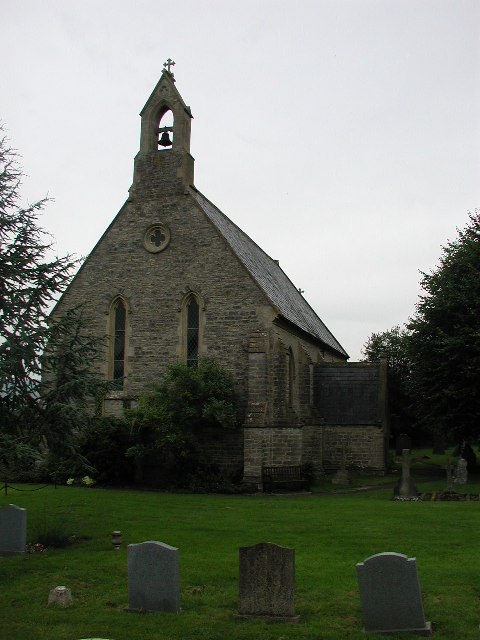
Christ Church in Henton

The parish was part of the hundred of Wells Forum.

The now-closed Wookey Station, once lying on Cheddar Valley line branch of the Bristol and Exeter Railway, is a geological Site of Special Scientific Interest.

The village included a manor house built by Bishop Jocelin of Wells in the 13th century. It was rebuilt in the sixteenth century and is now a farmhouse and Grade II* listed building.

The population in 1821 was 1,040, comprising 223 families, of which 147 were employed in agriculture.

The National School was founded in the village in 1844 by St Matthew's Church. From October to December 1880, H. G. Wells joined the school as a pupil-teacher aged 12, following a relative who was headteacher at that time. It later became Wookey Primary School, a community primary for around 85 children aged 4 to 11 of Wookey and the surrounding area.

== Governance ==
The parish council has responsibility for local issues, including setting an annual precept (local rate) to cover the council's operating costs and producing annual accounts for public scrutiny. The parish council evaluates local planning applications and works with the local police, district council officers, and neighbourhood watch groups on matters of crime, security, and traffic. The parish council's role also includes initiating projects for the maintenance and repair of parish facilities, as well as consulting with the district council on the maintenance, repair, and improvement of highways, drainage, footpaths, public transport, and street cleaning. Conservation matters (including trees and listed buildings) and environmental issues are also the responsibility of the council.

For local government purposes, since 1 April 2023, the village comes under the unitary authority of Somerset Council. Prior to this, it was part of the non-metropolitan district of Mendip, which was formed on 1 April 1974 under the Local Government Act 1972, having previously been part of Wells Rural District.

The village falls within the Wookey and St Cuthbert Out West electoral ward. The ward starts near Wells and stretches via St Cuthbert Out to Godney. The total population of this ward taken from the 2011 census was 2,510.

It is part of the Wells and Mendip Hills county constituency represented in the House of Commons of the Parliament of the United Kingdom. It elects one Member of Parliament (MP) by the first past the post system of election.

== Religious sites ==
St Matthew's Church dates from the twelfth century and is a Grade I listed building. It was granted to the dean of Wells by Bishop Robert, rebuilt by Bishop Reginald and assigned to the sub dean of the cathedral in 1209. The south chancel is thought to have been built to house the memorial to Thomas Clerke in 1556. Beside the church stands the Mellifont Abbey, which was once home to Sir Jacob Wolff, 1st Baronet, where a monument to him and his wife can be seen in the church. Mellifont Abbey is named after the abbey of the same name in Ireland.

== Notable residents ==
=== Politics ===
- John Clerke (before 1525 – after 1554), politician who sat in the House of Commons in 1547, lived in Wookey.
- Thomas Clerke (c. 1485 – 1555), MP for Wells in 1547 and father of John Clerke, lived in Wookey.
- A. J. Cook (1883–1931), trade unionist, was born in Wookey.
- Henry Rolle (1589–1656), Chief Justice of the King's Bench and politician who sat in the House of Commons at various times between 1614 and 1629, acquired a manor in Wookey.

=== Other ===
- Catherine Bathurst (1825–1907), Roman Catholic convert, nun and prioress, was born in Wookey.
- Sir Arthur Pearson, 1st Baronet (1866–1921), publisher and philanthropist, was born in Wookey.
- Martin Short (1943–2020), television documentary producer and author, was born in Wookey.
