= Matthew Shiffner =

Matthew Shiffner (c. 1690 – December 1756) was a Russian-born merchant, of German Baltic origins. He became a naturalised British citizen in 1711, before exploiting family connections to rise to prominence as a leading merchant in Russia; his links with the Russian Company allowed for him to become a major exporter of Russian goods to Britain in the 1730s. As favour at the imperial court changed from 1740, he moved over to London, where he ran his affairs from offices on Broad Street until his death.

== Early life and origins ==
Estimates place Shiffner's birth and around 1690. Although speculation and rumours by later genealogists made him a son of "an Archbishop of Riga", Shiffner's origins are obscure, though he likely hailed from a Baltic German background.

He became a naturalised English Citizen in 1711 under the Foreign Protestants Naturalization Act 1708. Shortly afterwards, he joined the Russian Company, which had, until 1698, a monopoly on trade between England and Russia and continued to operate successfully for over two centuries afterwards. He returned to Russia and is recorded as a 'Postdirektor' of Riga in 1720; he married into a locally prominent Baltic German family when he took as his wife Hedwig Agnata Bruiningk, daughter of Heintrich Bruiningk, a university-educated pastor and Generalsuperintendant of the Lutheran Church in Livonia. In 1723 he moved to St Petersburg and traded hemp in partnership with Jacob Wolff and John Edwards; his trading is recorded in the accounts of Samuel Holden and Thomas Wale.

== Career ==
When Duchess Anna of Courland became Tsarina (Empress) of Russia in 1730, German Baltic merchants were able to use their pre-existing connections with the Ducal family to further their trade interests. Shiffner's wife was said to have been a governess to the Duchess, and her younger sister, Anna Lucia, was a maid of honour. Shiffner and his partner, Wolff, exploited these connections to become one of the largest trading houses in the city. In 1730, the firm contracted for 1,500 barrels of potash, for instance, while also trading rhubarb, hemp and other commodities. It went on to ship 3,600 tons of Iron from Siberia during the early 1730s. Further contracts followed in 1734 and 1735, the latter making them the largest traders of rhubarb in Russia. Samuel Holden dealt with the British arrangements, receiving up to a half of the contract from Wolff and Shiffner.

The Tsarina's death in 1740 ended the prominence of the firm and Shiffner moved back to London, where he established offices on Broad Street and later in Bishopsgate Without. He died in December 1756 and his will, which provided for his children and widow, was proved in the Prerogative Court of Canterbury. The family business was taken over by his sons, Henry and John, who continued to trade with the Baltic region; they were declared insolvent in 1761, which Henry is recorded as blaming on John's "foolishness".

== Family ==
His marriage to Agnata produced six children, four sons and two daughters:

- Henry Shiffner (1721–1795), a merchant who became Member of Parliament for Minehead from 1761 to 1768.
- John Shiffner (died c. 1790), a merchant, who married, in 1753, Elizabeth Eleanor Godin (1733 - 1812), daughter of Stephen Peter Godin.
- Samuel Shiffner (died 1762), became a merchant in Jamaica.
- Dr. Matthew Shiffner, received £2000 by his father's will and a Doctorate from Leiden University.
- Catherine Shiffner, married Matthew Dorien of London.
- Benigna Gotlieb Shiffner, a god-daughter of Tsarina Anna, she received £4000 by her father's will and married Vincent John Biscoe of Surrey.

== Archives ==
- The Shiffner Papers, deposited at the East Sussex Record Office
