= Martin Short (author) =

UK documentary producer, author (1943–2020)

- Born: 22 September 1943; Wookey, Somerset, England
- Died: 27 August 2020 (aged 76); England
- Occupations: Author, television producer

Martin John Short (22 September 1943 – 27 August 2020) was a British TV documentary producer and author. He is best known for his exposés on organized crime and on Freemasonry.

== Early life ==
Short was born in Wookey, Somerset but later his family moved to London, where he attended St Dunstan's College in Catford. His father, George Short, was an aircraft engineer, and his mother, Hazel, was a nurse. In 1962, he went to Jesus College, Cambridge, to study history and was also a member of the Cambridge University Footlights Dramatic Club.

== Career ==
After graduating from university, Short travelled in the Middle East and did freelance work for the BBC, before working, from 1969 to 1984, on major current affairs programmes for the ITV companies Thames Television, Granada and London Weekend Television (on the Lebanon) and for Channel 4's Dispatches series (on the international arms trade). In 1988 he presented Charlie Richardson and the British Mafia for Longshot Productions and Channel 4. Short has also completed a television series based on his 1989 book Inside the Brotherhood (Further Secrets of the Freemasons), for the ITV network with Twenty Twenty Television and Granada.

As a result of his work on Freemasonry, Short made an extended appearance on Channel 4's After Dark television discussion series, and on 6 April 1989 was praised by Labour MP Max Madden in the UK House of Commons by way of two Early day motions asking the House to take action on information that Short had brought forward, and to congratulate Short on his work.

Short wrote, produced and narrated the prize winning ITV documentary series on the Mafia in America, Crime Incorporated. To accompany the series he also wrote Crime Inc.: A History of Organized Crime in America. In addition to feature articles for The Times, The Spectator, New Statesman, Punch and Time Out, he co-authored (in 1977) The Fall of Scotland Yard about police corruption in London.

Short appeared in two episodes of the BBC documentary series Bent Coppers: Crossing the Line of Duty, and provided the closing words at the end of the final episode: "Corruption doesn't go away. It's always there. You cannot get rid of it. All you can hope to do is to contain it, bottle it up, expose the worst examples of it, send the worst offenders to prison. Just as the price of liberty is eternal vigilance, the price of a clean police force is to never give up on the fight against corruption".

== Personal life and death ==
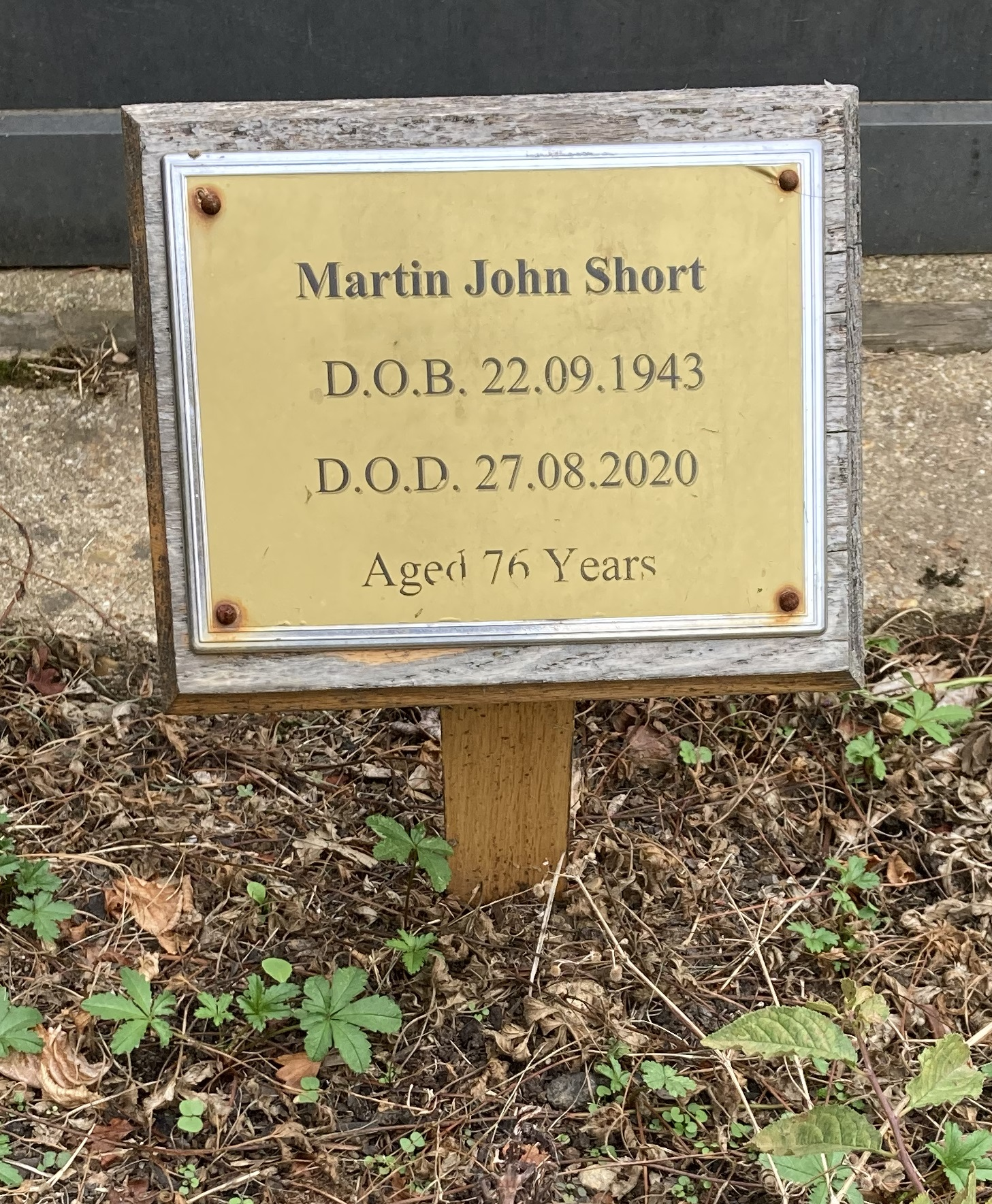
Grave of Martin Short in Highgate Cemetery

Short married Sana Saidi in 1974; when doing research in Lebanon in the early 1970s, a family he met asked him to take a letter back to their daughter (Sana), who was studying at university in London. The couple had three children.

Short died in 2020, from cancer, and was buried on the eastern side of Highgate Cemetery.

== Books ==
- The Fall of Scotland Yard, with Barry Cox et John Shirley, Penguin Books (1977) ISBN 978-0140523188
- Crime Inc., Thames Methuen Publishing (1984), ISBN 978-0423010404
- Inside the Brotherhood, Grafton (1989) ISBN 978-0246130204
- Lundy: The Destruction of Scotland Yard’s Finest Detective, Grafton (1992), ISBN 978-0586209646
- Informer, with Ron Farebrother, Smith Gryphon (1997), ISBN 978-1856851145
- Survivor : Story of Jimmy Evans, with Jimmy Evans, Mainstream Publishing (2001) ISBN 978-1840184884
- The Enforcer: Secrets of My Life with the Krays, with Albert Donoghue, John Blake Publishing (2002), ISBN 978-1857825251
- Blake's Classic True Crime Compendium, with Drew MacKenzie, John Lightfoot, Tim Brown, Paul Cheston, Ron Farebrother, John Blake Publishing (2003), ISBN 978-1857825619
- Blake's Classic True Crime Compendium 2, with Tim Brown, Paul Cheston, Ron Farebrother, John Blake Publishing (2004), ISBN 978-1857825275
