= Andrews baronets of Shaw Place (1766) =

Escutcheon of the Andrews Baronets of Shaw Place

The Andrews baronetcy, of Shaw Place in the County of Berkshire, was created in the Baronetage of Great Britain on 19 August 1766 for Joseph Andrews. He was the son of Joseph Andrews (died 1753), Paymaster of the Forces in Scotland at the time of the Jacobite Rising of 1715.

The title was created with special remainder to his half-brother James Pettit Andrews (died 1797), a police magistrate for Middlesex. The 2nd Baronet, an officer in the 1st Regiment of Foot Guards, was the eldest son of James Pettit Andrews. The title became extinct on his death in 1822.

== Andrews baronets, of Shaw Place (1766) ==
- Sir Joseph Andrews, 1st Baronet (1727–1800)
- Sir Joseph Andrews, 2nd Baronet (1768–1822)

== Notes ==
Baronetage of Great Britain
Preceded by Cheere baronets	Andrews baronets of Shaw Place; 19 August 1766	Succeeded by Thomas baronets
