= Eusebius Buswell =

Sir Eusebius Buswell, 1st Baronet (1681–1730?), was a baronet in the Baronetage of Great Britain.

He was born at Tickencote, Rutland, in 1681. He matriculated at Pembroke College, Oxford, on 20 May 1698 aged 17. He was the eldest son of Eusebius Buswell, formerly Pelsant, of Lyddington, Rutland, by Frances Wingfield, daughter of Sir Richard Wingfield of Tickencote. Eusebius Buswell, Senior, was the son of Sir Eusebius Pelsant of Cadeby, Leicestershire, by his second wife Anne, the sister of Sir George Buswell, Baronet. Sir George died without issue on 10 March 1667, when Eusebius Buswell, Senior, was about 11 years old and presumably still called Pelsant. By 1706, he had adopted the surname of his maternal uncle, Buswell.

Eusebius Buswell, Junior, was created a baronet on 5 March 1714, and was the last baronet created during the reign of Anne, Queen of Great Britain.

He married firstly, Hester Skrymshire, second daughter and co-heir of Sir Charles Skrymshire of Norbury, Staffordshire, by his first wife Hester Taylor, daughter and heiress of George Taylor of Darwent Hall, Derbyshire. She died without issue on 7 April 1706, and was buried at All Saints' Church, Clipston, Northamptonshire. He married secondly on 21 December 1710 in Standon, Staffordshire, England, to Honora Sneyd (baptised 23 May 1694), daughter of Ralph Sneyd, of Keel Hall, Staffordshire. They had an only daughter, Frances, who married Christopher Horton of Catton, Derbyshire.

On his death in or about 1730, the baronetcy became extinct. His estate was heavily in debt, and a private bill "for vesting certain Lands and Estates, in the Counties of Stafford, Leicester, Rutland, and Northampton, late the Estates of Sir Eusebius Buswell Baronet, deceased, in Trustees, to be sold, for the Payment of his Debts" was passed by the Parliament of Great Britain in June 1732 to enable payment.

There is a memorial tablet in All Saints' Church, Clipston, that reads "Eusebius Buswell died 1730".

== Arms ==
His coat of arms was Argent five lozenges in fess between three bears' heads erased Gules muzzled Or.

Baronetage of Great Britain
New creation	Baronet (of Clipston); 1714–1730	Extinct
Preceded by Cope baronets	Buswell baronets of Clipston; 5 March 1714	Succeeded by Beck baronets
