= Buswell baronets =

Extinct baronetcy in the Baronetage of England

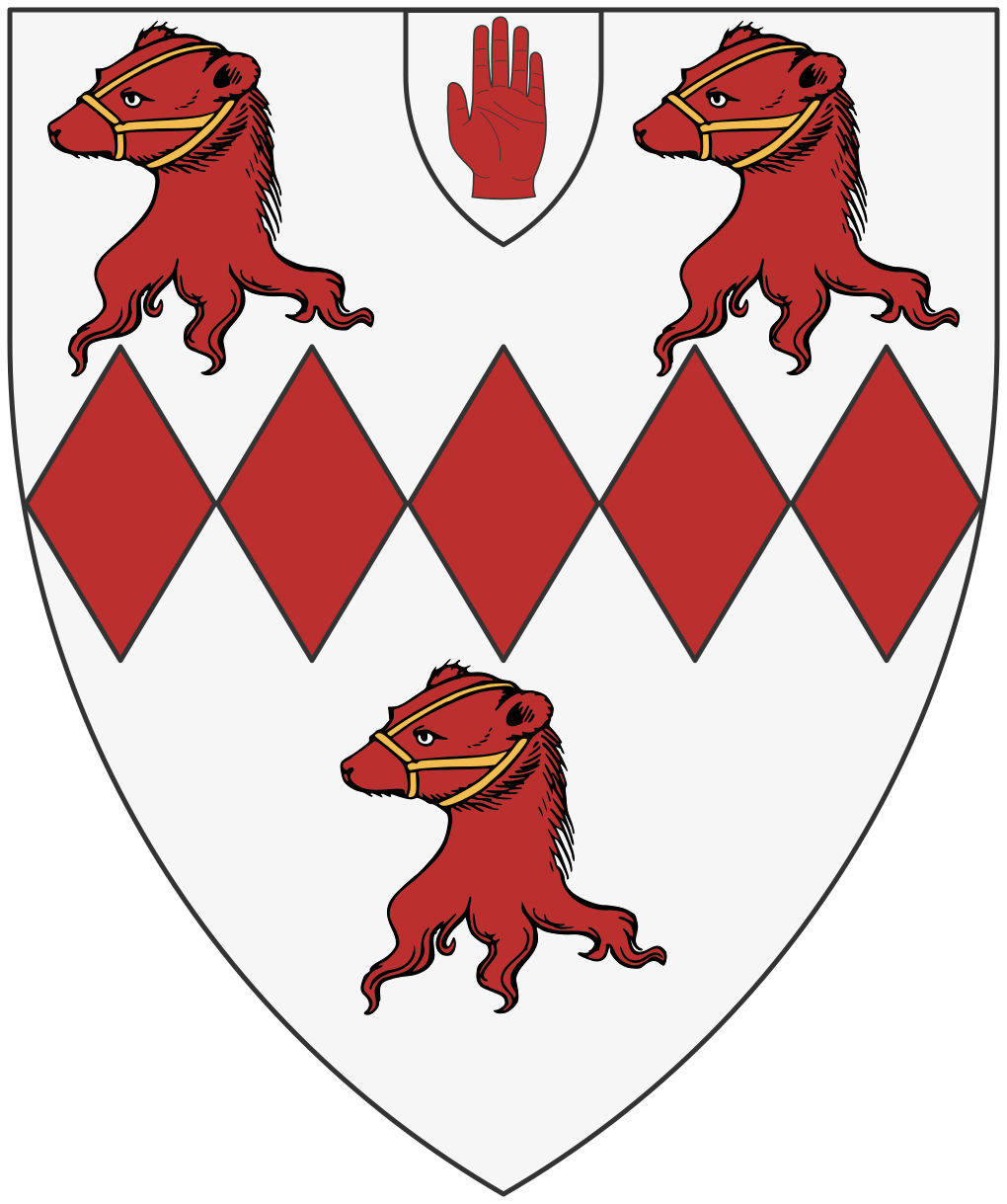
The coat of arms of the Buswells (Boswells) of Clipston.

There have been two baronetcies created for persons with the surname Buswell, one in the Baronetage of England and one in the Baronetage of Great Britain. Both creations became extinct on the death of the first holder.

The Buswell Baronetcy, of Clipston in the County of Northamptonshire, was created in the Baronetage of England on 7 July 1660 for George Buswell, subsequently High Sheriff of Northamptonshire from 1662 to 1663. The title became extinct on his death in 1668.

The Buswell Baronetcy, of Clipston in the County of Northampton, was created in the Baronetage of Great Britain on 5 March 1714 for Eusebius Buswell. He was the son of Eusebius Buswell (originally Eusebius Pelsant), who had assumed the surname of Buswell, son of Sir Eusebius Pelsant and Anne Buswell, sister of the first Baronet of the 1660 creation. The title became extinct on his death.

== Buswell baronets, of Clipston (1660) ==
- Sir George Buswell, 1st Baronet (c. 1625–1668)

== Buswell baronets, of Clipston (1714) ==
- Sir Eusebius Buswell, 1st Baronet (1681–1730?)
