= Pepperell baronets =

Set index for Pepperell baronets

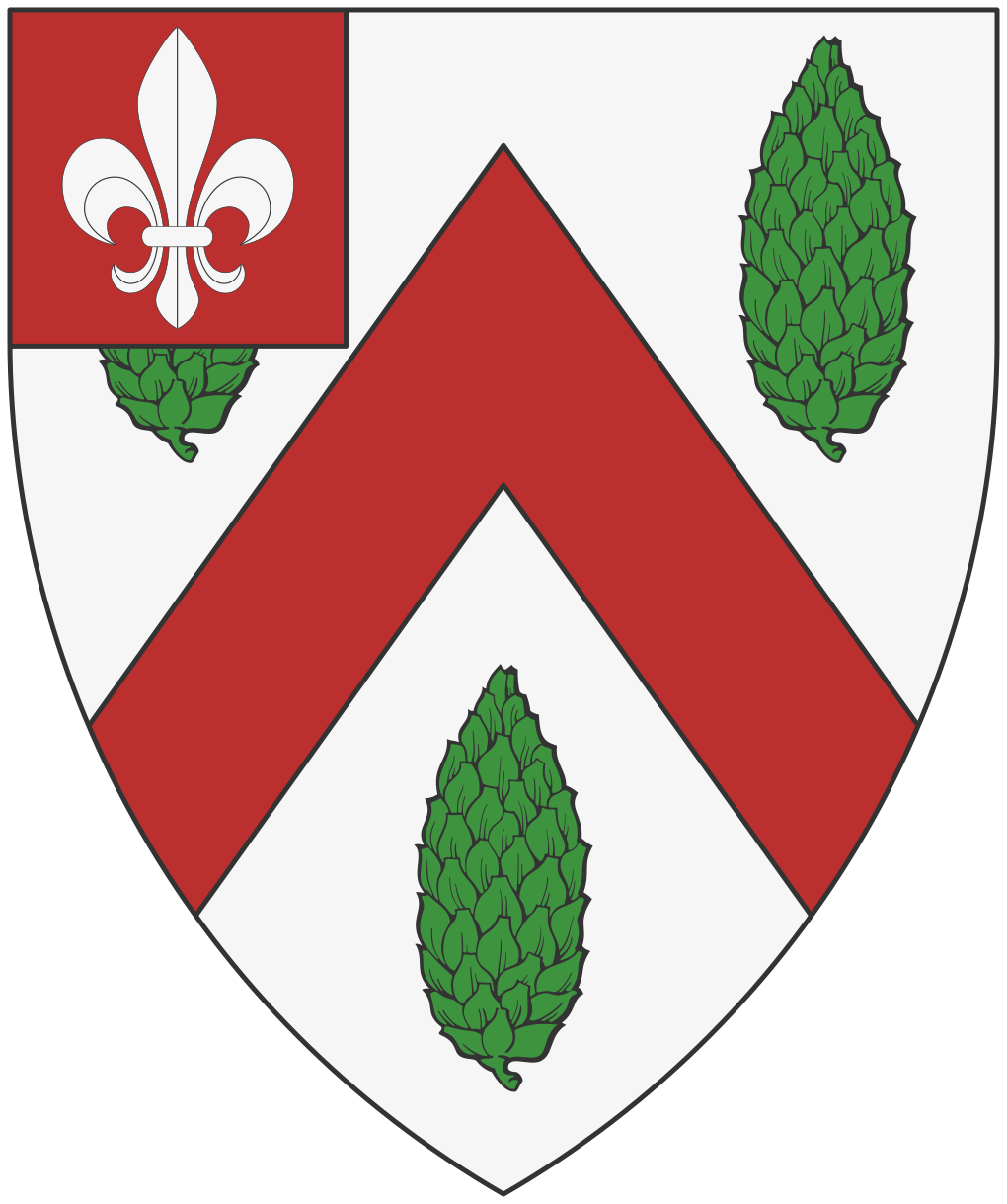
Arms of Pepperell of Boston, Massachusetts

There have been two baronetcies created for members of the Pepperell family, both in the Baronetage of Great Britain. Both creations are extinct. The spelling Pepperrell was used in American official documents of the period.

- Pepperell baronets of Boston (1st creation, 1746): see William Pepperrell
- Pepperell baronets of Boston (2nd creation, 1774): see William Pepperrell the younger
