= Beck baronets =

Title in the Baronetage of Great Britain

Escutcheon of the Beck baronets of the City of London

The Beck Baronetcy, of the City of London, was a title in the Baronetage of Great Britain. It was created on 1 November 1714 for Justus Beck, a London merchant. It was the first baronetcy created in the reign of George I of Great Britain. The title became extinct on the death of his second son, the third baronet, in 1764.

== Beck baronets, of the City of London (1714) ==
- Sir Justus Beck, 1st Baronet (died 15 December 1722), married Rachel Chamberlayne (died 1 October 1734), daughter of Charles Chamberlayne. His father-in-law was Alderman of London (1687–88). They had five sons: Chamberlayne, Justus, Jacob, George and Frederick, two of whom succeeded to the baronetcy.
- Sir Chamberlayne Beck, 2nd Baronet (died unmarried August 1730)
- Sir Justus Denis Beck, 3rd Baronet (died unmarried aged 56 on 12 January 1764 in Wood Street, London)

Baronetage of Great Britain
Preceded by Buswell baronets	Beck baronets of the City of London; 1 November 1714	Succeeded by Austen baronets
