= Green baronets of Sampford (1660) =

Escutcheon of the Green baronets of Sampford

The Green baronetcy, of Sampford in the County of Essex, was created in the Baronetage of England on 26 July 1660 for Edward Green. The title became extinct on his death in 1676. Green married, as his fourth wife, Catherine Pegge, a mistress of Charles II of England.

== Green baronets, of Sampford (1660) ==
- Sir Edward Green, 1st Baronet (died 1676)
