= Cheere baronets =

Title in the Baronetage of Great Britain

The Cheere baronetcy, of St Margaret's in the City of Westminster, was a title in the Baronetage of Great Britain. It was created on 19 July 1766 for the sculptor and civic official Sir Henry Cheere. The title became extinct on the death of the 2nd Baronet in 1808.

== Cheere baronets, of St. Margaret's (1766) ==
- Sir Henry Cheere, 1st Baronet (c.1703–1781)
- Sir William Cheere, 2nd Baronet (c.1730–1808), died aged 72 at White Roding, where he was rector

Baronetage of Great Britain
| Preceded by Burrell baronets | Cheere baronets of St. Margaret's; 19 July 1766 | Succeeded by Andrews baronets |
