= Green baronets =

Set index for Green baronets

There have been five baronetcies created for persons with the surname Green, one in the Baronetage of England, one in the Baronetage of Great Britain and three in the Baronetage of the United Kingdom. Only one creation is extant as of 2023.

- Green baronets of Sampford (1660)
- Green baronets of Marass (1786)
- Green baronets of Milnrow (1805): see Sir Charles Green, 1st Baronet (1749–1831)
- Green baronets of Wakefield (1886)
- Green baronets of Belsize Park (1901)
