= James baronets of Creshall (1682) =

Extinct baronetcy in the Baronetage of England

James baronets
- Escutcheon of the James baronets of Creshall
- Creation date: 1682
- Status: extinct
- Extinction date: 1741

The James baronets of Creshall in the County of Essex were created in the Baronetage of England on 28 June 1682 for Cane James. The title became extinct on the death of the second Baronet in 1741.

== James baronets, of Creshall (1682) ==
- Sir Cane James, 1st Baronet (c. 1656–1736)
- Sir John James, 2nd Baronet (c. 1692–1741)

== Background ==
The first baronet was James Cane, nephew of Sir John James who was knighted in 1655. He reversed his names to comply with a condition for inheritance from his unmarried uncle, who built Creshall Hall, at Chrishall.
