= Wolff baronets =

Extinct baronetcy in the Baronetage of England

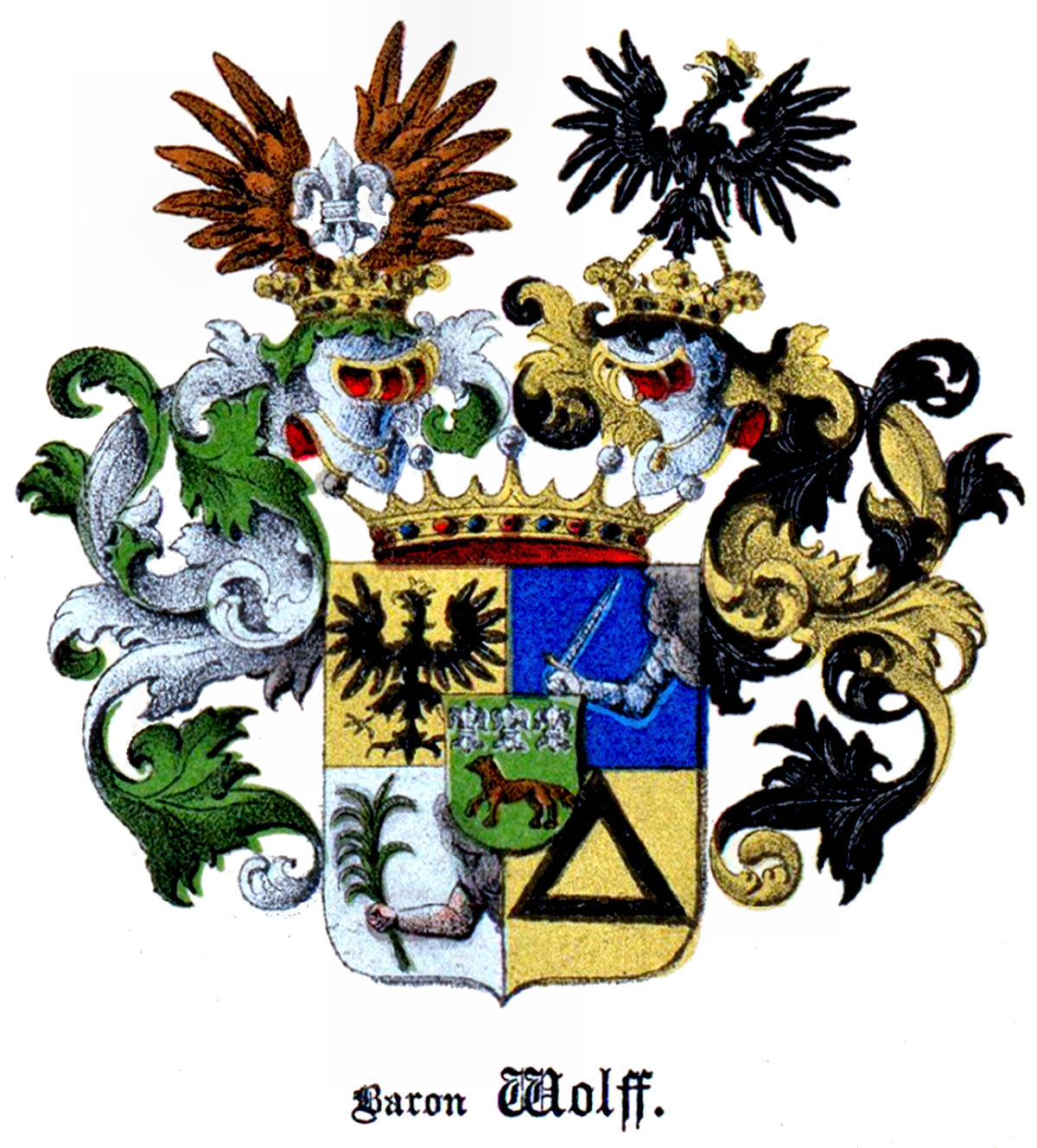
Coat of arms of Barons Wolff

The Wolff Baronetcy, of Town Hill in Southampton in the County of Southampton, was a title in the Baronetage of Great Britain. It was created on 27 October 1766 for Jacob Wolff by King George III. His father, Godfrey (Carl Gottfried) Wolff (1704–1788) had already been created a Baron of the Holy Roman Empire in 1761 by Emperor Francis I.

== History ==
On his father's side Sir Jacob Wolff descended from the Lutheran noble family von Wolff in Sagan (Silesia). During the Counter-Reformation in the 17th century, they left for the Baltic region, then under the Swedish crown, where the Lutheran faith prevailed. When Peter the Great conquered the Baltic coast, Sir Jacob Wolff's father, Godfrey (Carl Gottfried) Wolff (1704–1788), was deported together with his family to Vologda and later came to live in Moscau, where Sir Jacob Wolff was born on the 27 January 1739.

Sir Jacob Wolff was sent by his uncle, also named Jacob Wolff (1698–1759), to London to look after his business interests there. The latter was a leading trader (Business partner of Matthew Shiffner at "Shiffner & Wolff") and banker in Saint Petersburg, then capital of the Russian Empire. There he also served as consul and general resident of the Kingdom of Great Britain. After the death of his childless uncle, Sir Jacob Wolff inherited his fortune of £120,000.

Sir Jacob Wolff was naturalised 1762 as a British citizen and married 1766 Anne the daughter of Edward Weston of Somerby Hall, Lincolnshire. The couple first lived at Cams Hall, Hampshire and later Mellyfont Abbey, Wookey, Somerset, and Chulmleigh, Devon and were buried at St Matthew's church, Wookey, Somerset where a monument stands in memory of the 1st Baronet, the Dame and their children.

Sir James William Weston Wolff, the only son of Sir Jacob Wolff, married Francis Adkins in 1800. They had three daughters, Lucie, Sophie and Charlotte. The title became extinct on the death of the second Baronet in 1837.

== Wolff baronets, of Town Hill (1766) ==
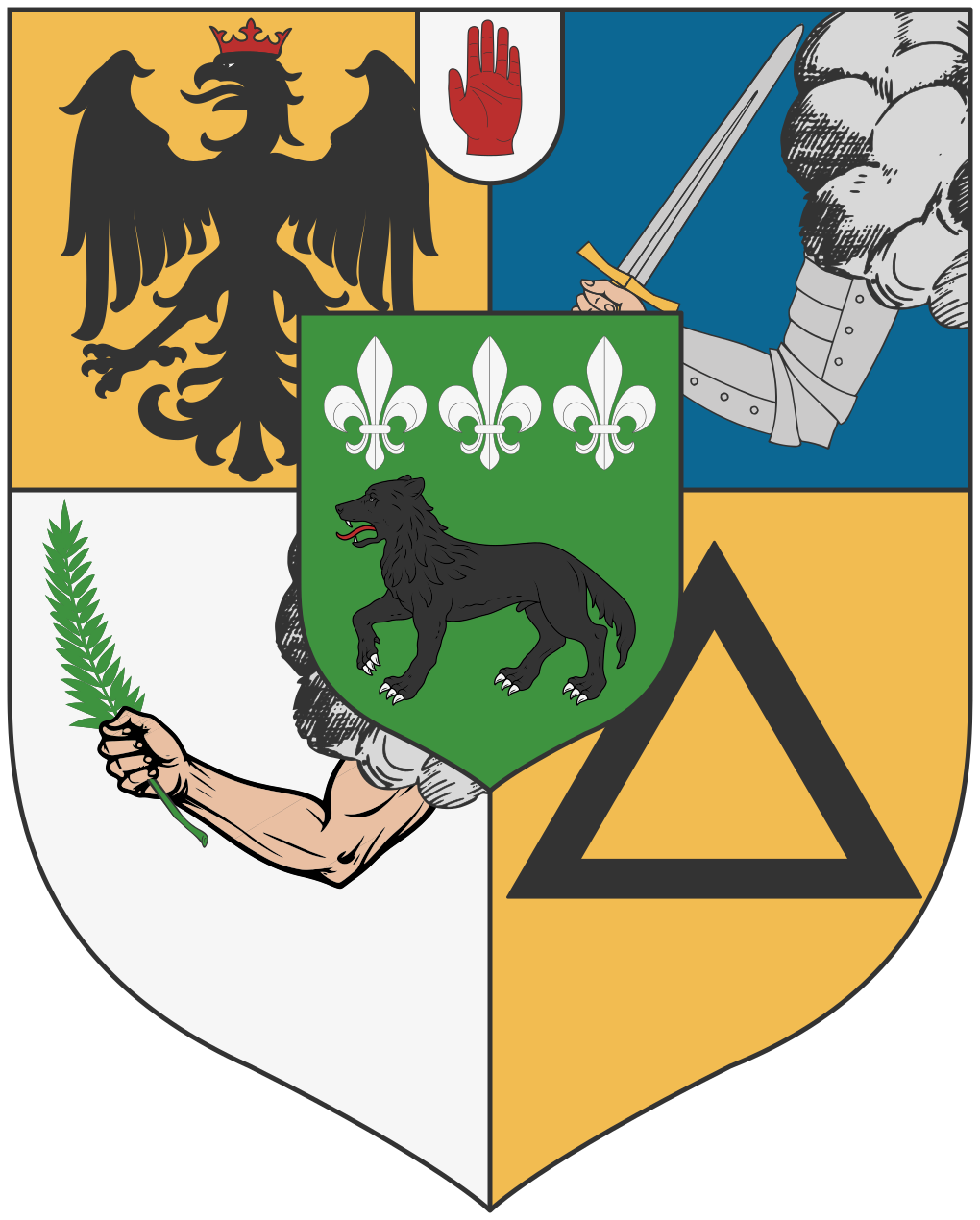
Arms of Wolff of Cams Hall

- Sir Jacob Wolff, 1st Baronet (1739–1809);
- Sir James William Weston Wolff, 2nd Baronet (1778–1837).

Baronetage of Great Britain
Preceded by Thomas baronets	Wolff baronets of Town Hill; 27 October 1766	Succeeded by Champneys baronets
