= Gilbert baronets =

Extinct baronetcy in the Baronetage of the United Kingdom

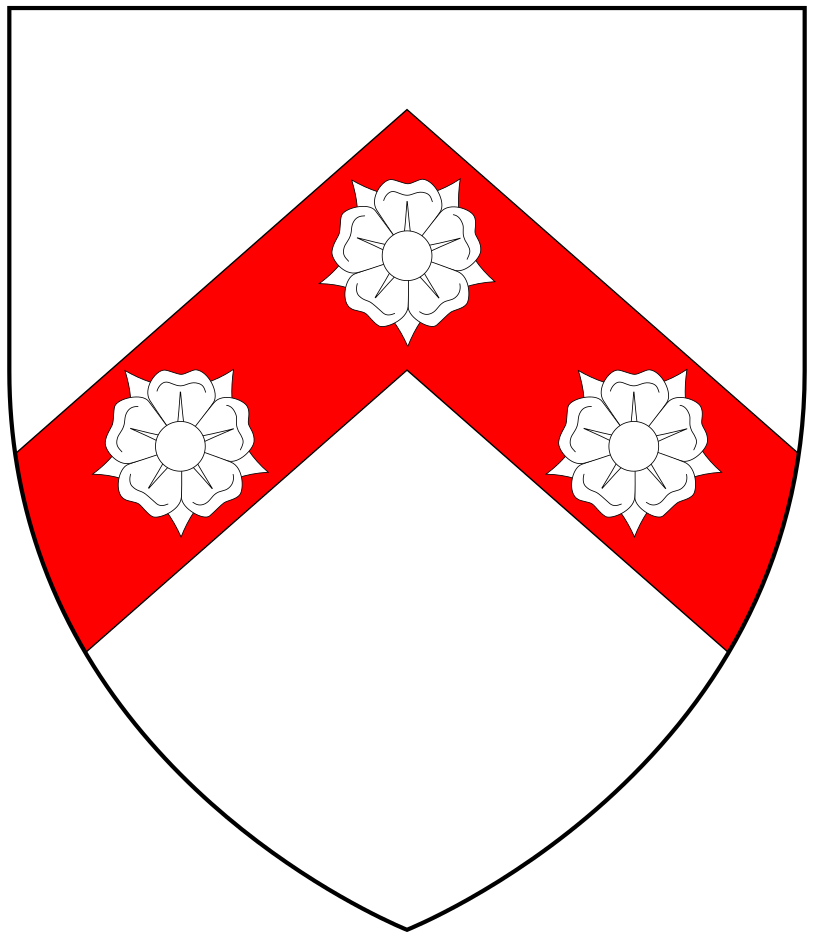
Arms of Gilbert: Argent, on a chevron gules three roses of the field

The Gilbert Baronetcy was a title in the Baronetage of the United Kingdom. It was created in 1851 for Major-General Sir Walter Gilbert. The title became extinct on the death of his son Francis, the second Baronet.

== Gilbert baronets (1851) ==
- Sir Walter Raleigh Gilbert, 1st Baronet (1785–1853)
- Sir Francis Gilbert, 2nd Baronet (1816-1863)

== Arms ==
Coat of arms of Gilbert baronets

Notes
Crest
A Squirrel sejant Gules.
Escutcheon
Ermine, on a Chevron Sable, three Roses Argent, barbed and seeded proper.
Supporters
Dexter: a Grenadier of the 1st European Bengal Fusiliers, holding in the exterior hand a Musket, all proper. Sinister: a Sepoy of the 15th (later the 30th) Bengal Native Infantry, holding in the exterior hand a Musket, all proper. (1st Baronet only)
Motto
MALLEM MORI QUAM MUTARE (How much do evil ways change us)
Orders
Order of the Bath circlet (Appointed KCB 1846 and GCB 1849) (1st Baronet only)
