= Gough baronets =

Baronetcy in the Baronetage of the United Kingdom

There have been two baronetcies created for people with the surname Gough, one in the Baronetage of Great Britain and one in the Baronetage of the United Kingdom. The second holder of the first creation was elevated to the peerage in 1796 and the first baronet of the second creation in 1846.

== Gough baronets, of Edgbaston (6 April 1728) ==
- see the Baron Calthorpe

== Gough baronets, of Synone and Drangan (23 December 1842) ==
- see the Viscount Gough
