= Church of St John the Baptist, Eastnor =

Coordinates: 52.0328°N 2.393°W

St John's Church, Eastnor
- Church of St John the Baptist, Eastnor
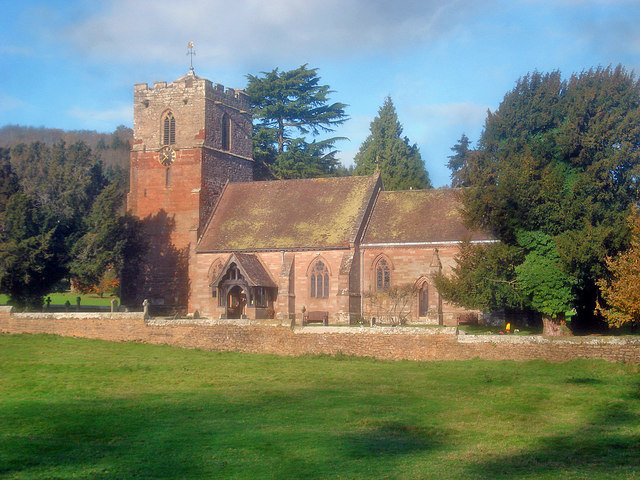
- “A high quality but little known masterpiece”

- Location in Hereford
- Location: Eastnor, Herefordshire
- Country: England
- Denomination: Anglican

History
- Status: Parish church

Architecture
- Functional status: Active
- Heritage designation: Grade I
- Designated: 18 November 1952
- Architect: George Gilbert Scott
- Architectural type: Church

Administration
- Diocese: Diocese of Hereford
- Parish: Eastnor

Clergy
- Vicar: Revd Keith Hilton-Turvey

The Church of St John the Baptist is a Church of England parish church at Eastnor in the English county of Herefordshire. Of 12th century origins, the church was completely rebuilt between 1851 and 1852 by George Gilbert Scott for John Somers-Cocks, 2nd Earl Somers. It is a Grade I listed building.

== History ==
The original church was probably constructed in the 12th century. It was rebuilt in the 13th century and the tower, now the earliest remaining part, was constructed in the 14th. In 1851, John Somers-Cocks, 2nd Earl Somers, of Eastnor Castle, commissioned George Gilbert Scott to undertake a complete rebuilding. Scott originally intended to reuse much of the original material, and the stones of the earlier church were taken down and numbered with this intention. Most were, however, found to be so deteriorated that reuse was impossible and, with the exception of the 14th-century tower, the current church dates almost entirely from Scott's reconstruction.

Eastnor Churchyard
I be hopin’ you remember,
Now the Spring has come again,
How we used to gather violets
By the little church at Eastnor,
For we were so happy then!
O my love, do you remember
Kisses that you took and gave?
There be violets now in plenty
By the little church at Eastnor,
But they’re growing on your grave.

— Eastnor Churchyard, in Songs of Three Counties by Radclyffe Hall, published in 1913

The 2nd Earl did not live to see the completion of his new church, dying in 1852. He was succeeded by his son, Charles who died in 1883 and is interred in the centre of the Somers-Cocks mortuary chapel in the church.

St John's remains an active parish church in the Diocese of Hereford.

The church is commemorated in Songs of Three Counties by Radclyffe Hall. [See box]

== Architecture ==
St John's is constructed of local red sandstone and comprises the 14th-century tower, a nave, a north aisle and the Somers-Cocks mortuary chapel. The church fittings include a painting of The Crucifixion with a decorated frame by Augustus Pugin. (Note: Cocks' father, the 1st Earl Somers had commissioned Robert Smirke to replace their ancestral mansion with an enormous castellated house, Eastnor Castle. The 2nd Earl engaged Pugin to undertake a major redecoration of the interiors.) The church is a Grade I listed building, its Historic England entry describing it as a “high quality but little known masterpiece”.

== Gallery ==
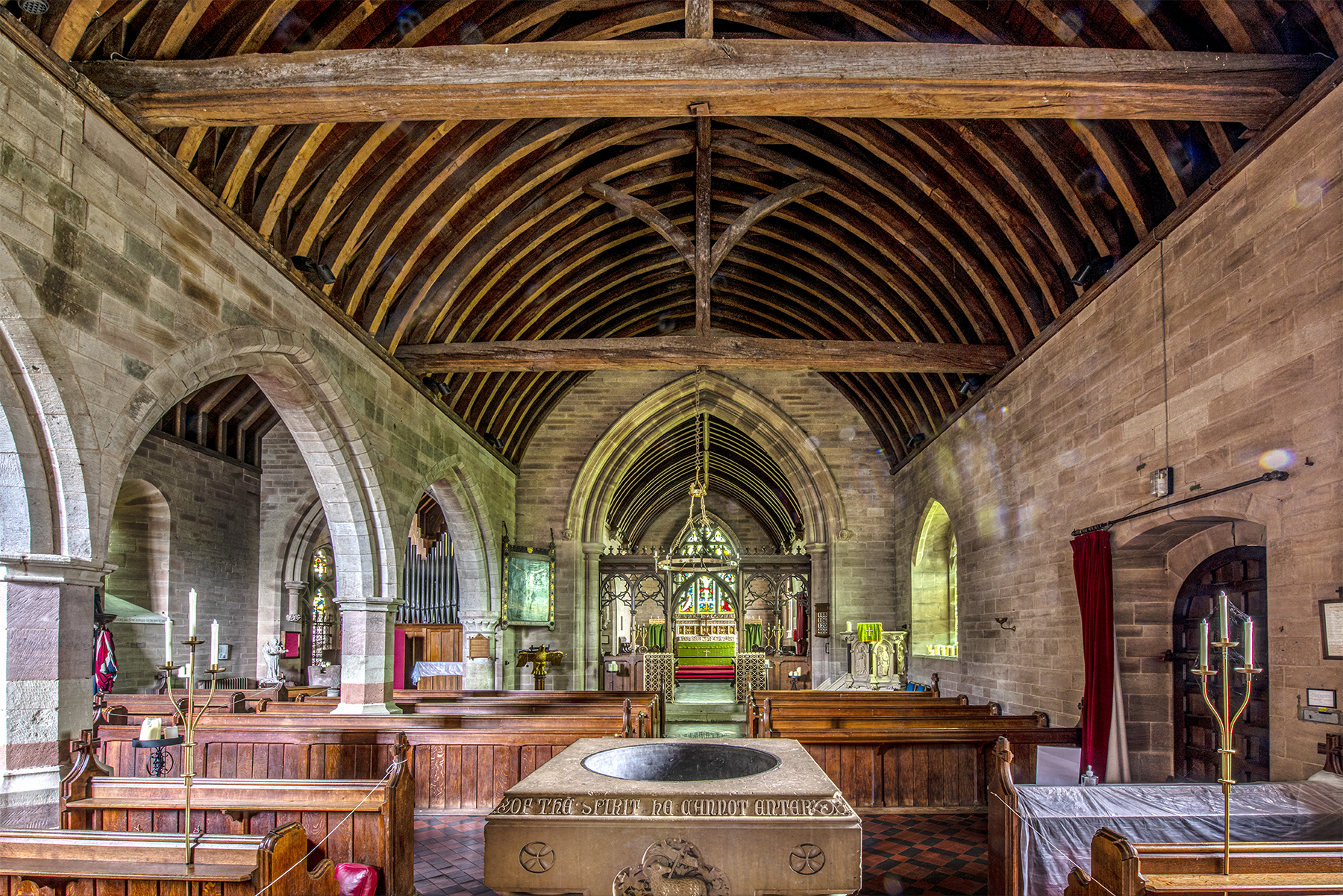
Nave

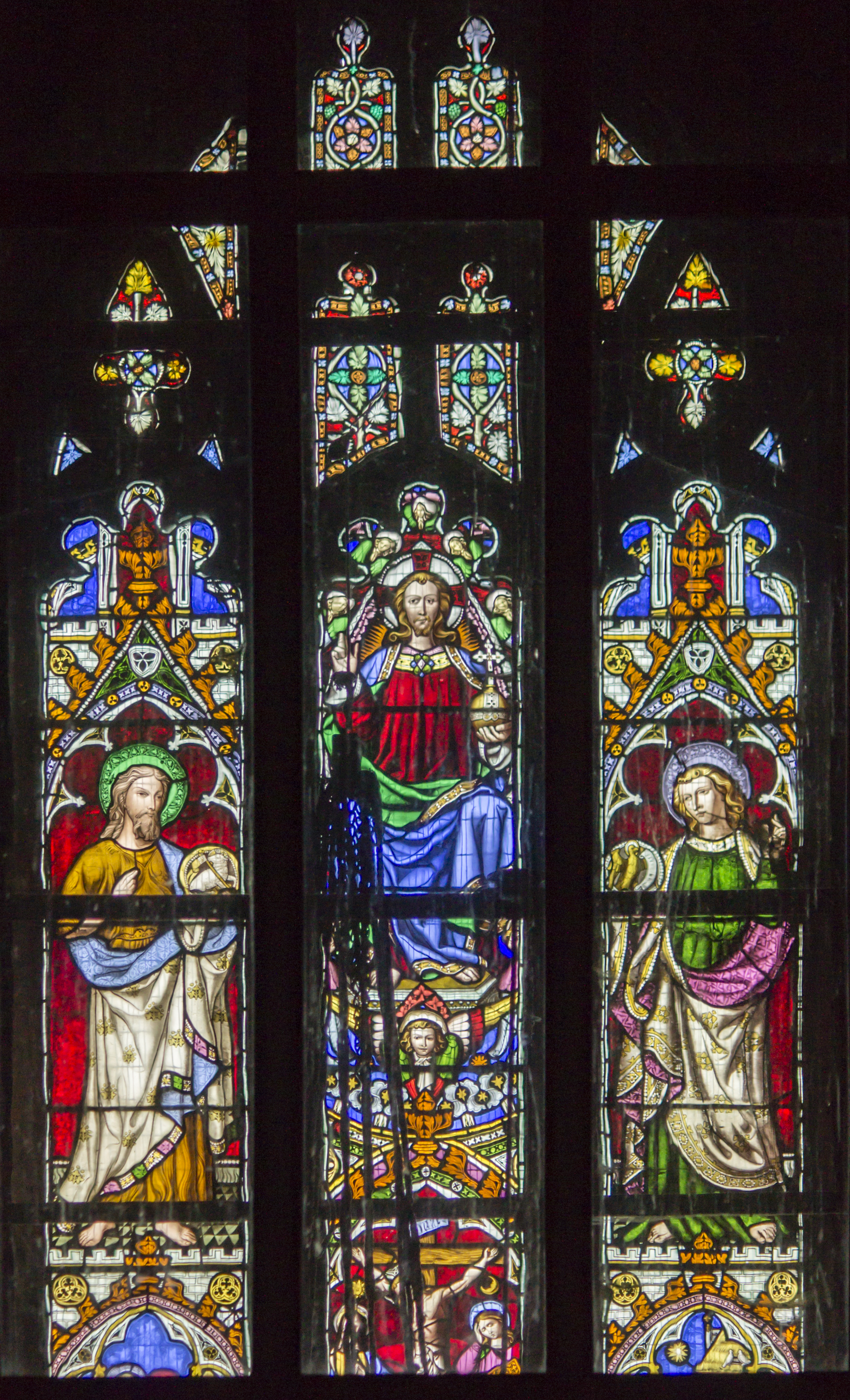
Stained glass in the west window

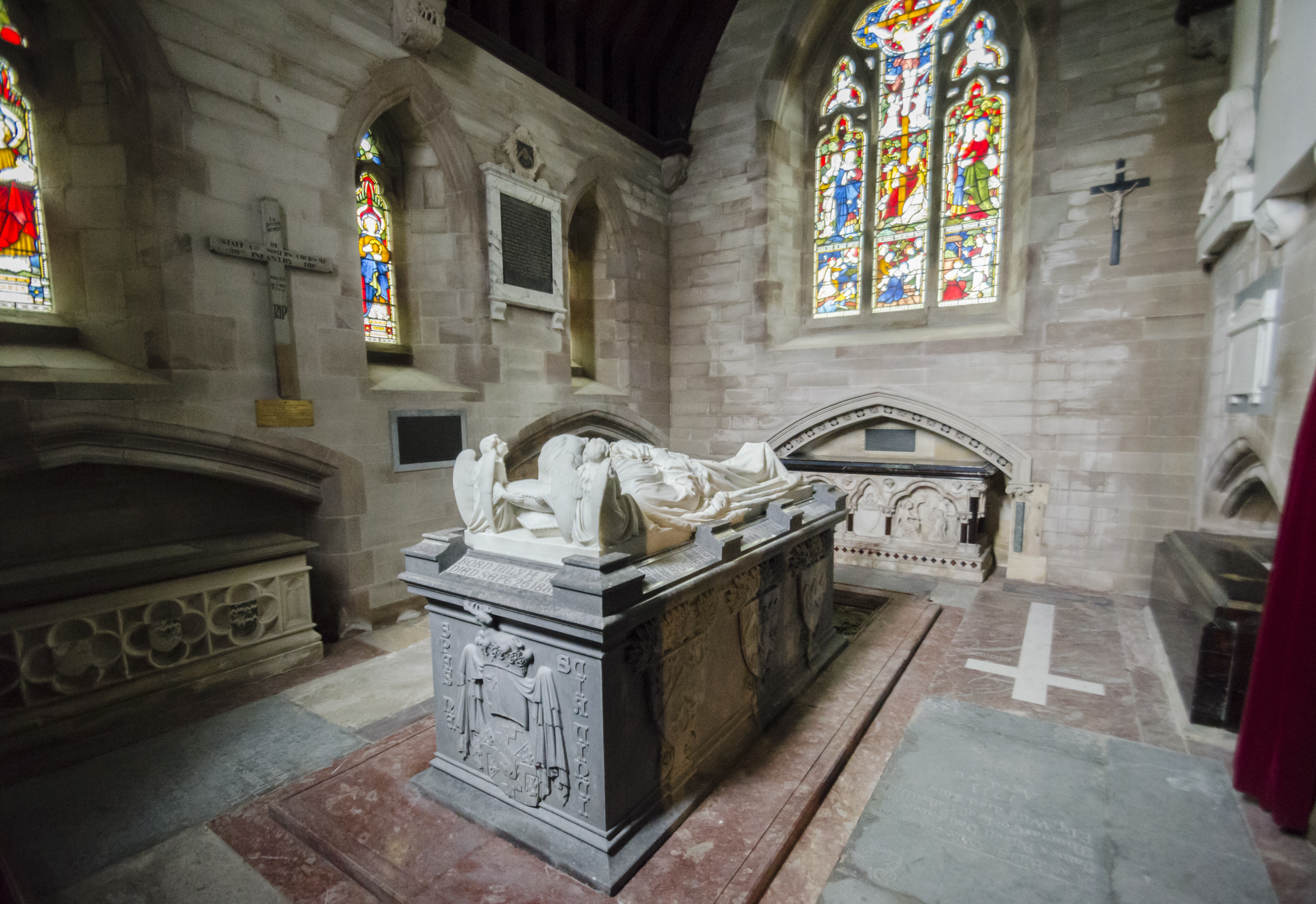
Somers-Cocks mortuary chapel

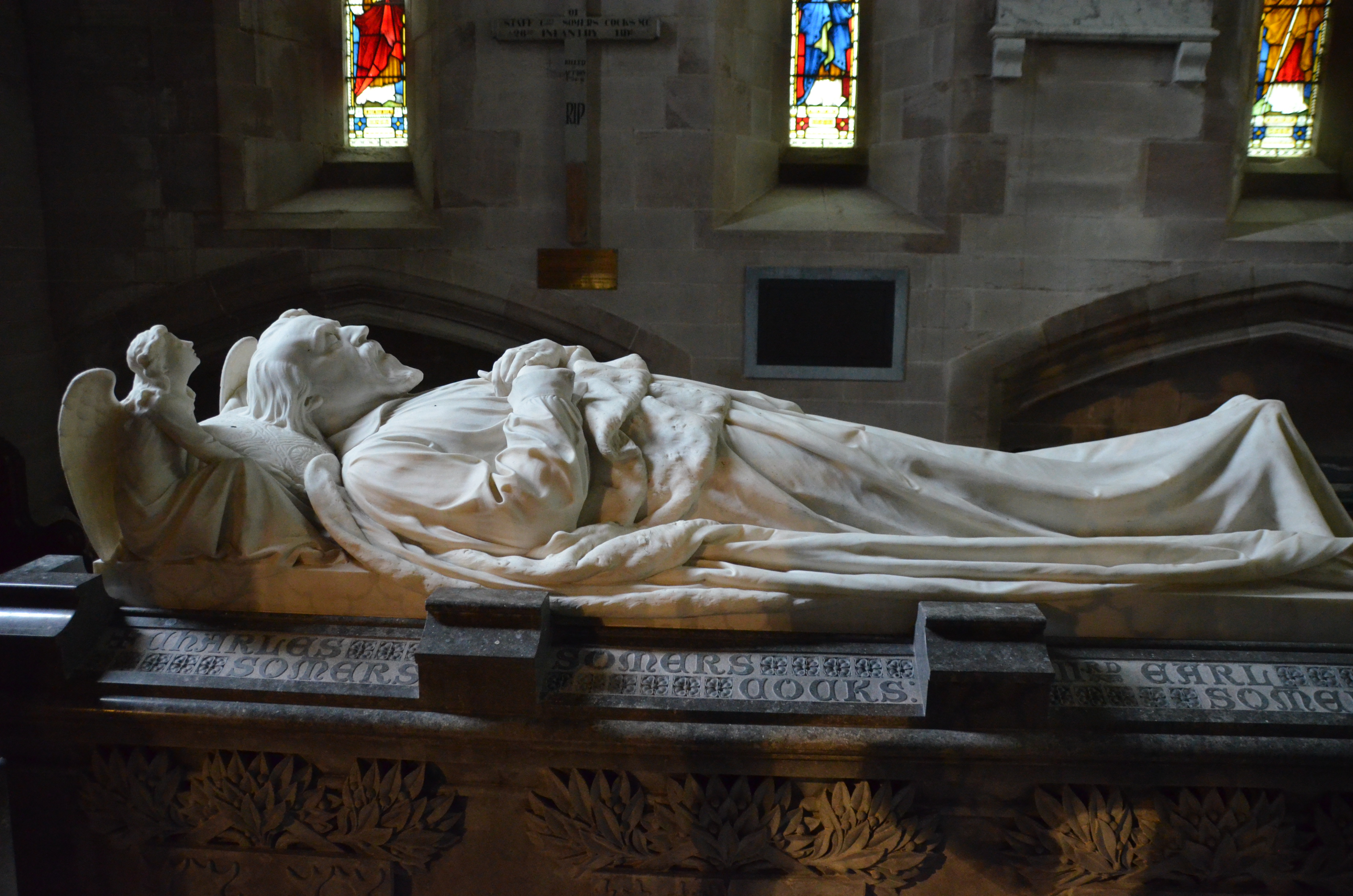
Memorial to Charles Somers-Cocks, 3rd Earl Somers in the mortuary chapel

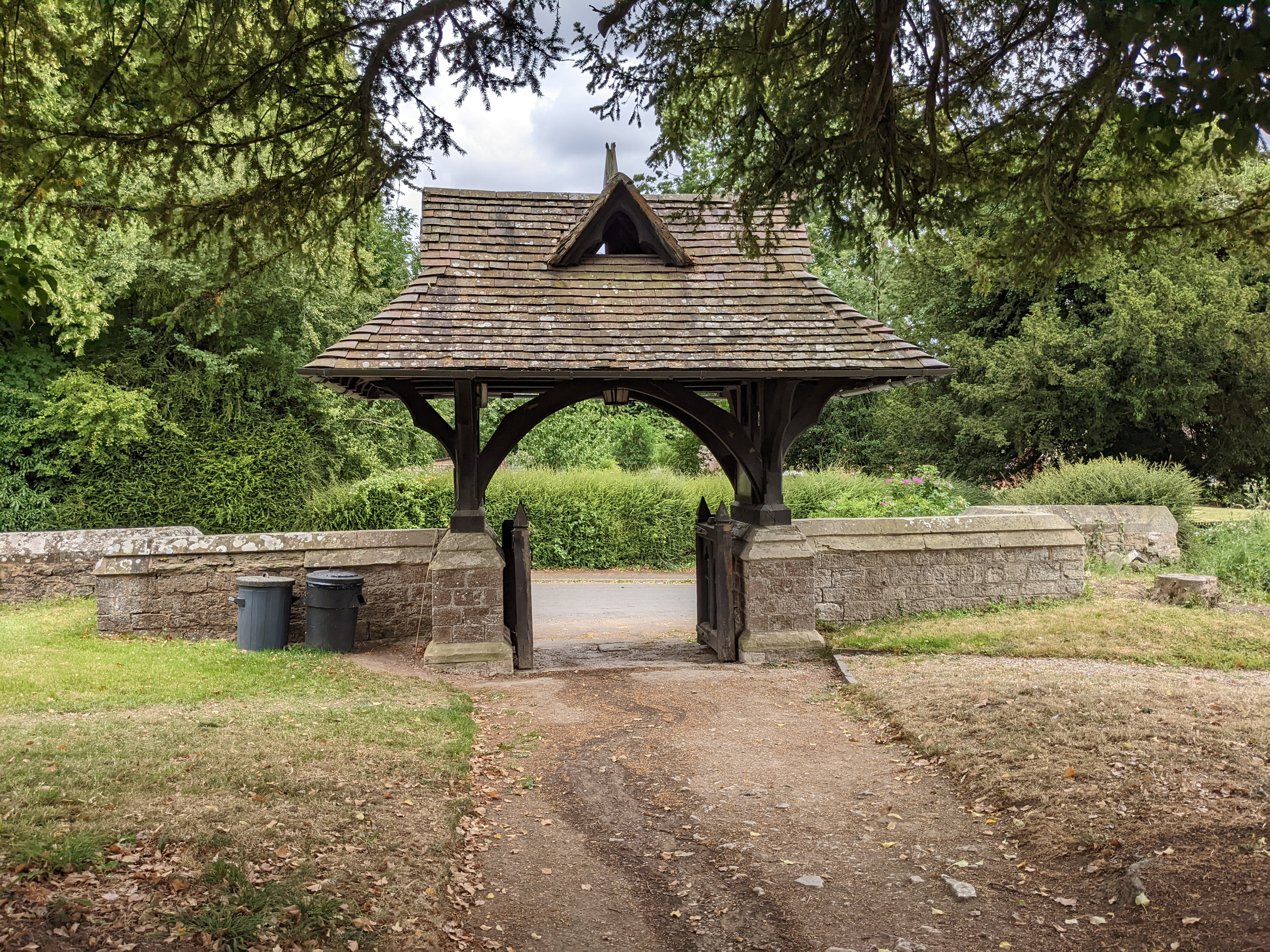
Lychgate
