= Copley baronets =

Set index for Copley baronets

There have been two baronetcies created for the surname Copley, one in the Baronetage of England and one in the Baronetage of Great Britain. Both are extinct.

- Copley baronets of Sprotbrough (1st creation, 1661)
- Copley baronets of Sprotbrough (2nd creation, 1778)
