= Eastnor, Herefordshire =

Village in Herefordshire, England

Coordinates: 52.033°N 2.392°W

Eastnor
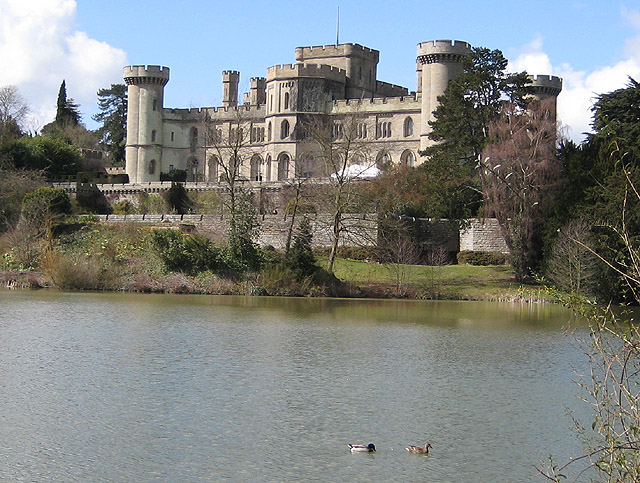
- Eastnor Castle

- Location within Herefordshire
- Population: 339 (2011)
- OS grid reference: SO7343636836
- Civil parish: Eastnor
- Unitary authority: Herefordshire
- Region: West Midlands
- Country: England
- Sovereign state: United Kingdom
- Post town: Ledbury
- Postcode district: HR8
- Dialling code: 01531
- Police: West Mercia
- Fire: Hereford and Worcester
- Ambulance: West Midlands
- UK Parliament: North Herefordshire

Eastnor /iːstnər/ is a village in Herefordshire, England, 2 mi (3 km) east of Ledbury and the same distance from the tripoint of the county with Worcestershire and Gloucestershire.

Eastnor Castle built by Earl Somers (d.1841) is within its medieval-founded parish which it is named after. The settlement is also the main settlement of its civil parish.

The 12th-century Church of St John the Baptist was redesigned and rebuilt by Sir George Gilbert Scott in 1852 and is a grade I listed building. Eastnor Lake occupies a similar area to the village centre and is at the point where two streams from the north join to form the Glynch Brook, one of two similar axis left-bank tributaries of the River Leadon.
