= Thomas Symonds =

Thomas Symonds may refer to:

- Thomas Symonds (Royal Navy officer, died 1792), British naval captain of the American Revolutionary War
- Thomas Symonds (Royal Navy officer, died 1894), Admiral of the Fleet
- Thomas Powell Symonds, Member of Parliament (MP) for Hereford
- Tom Symonds, Australian rugby league player
