= Roger Oates =

- Type: Limited
- Industry: Textiles and Home Interiors
- Founded: June 4, 1987
- Founders: Roger Oates & Fay Morgan
- Headquarters: Eastnor, UK
- Website: rogeroates.com

Roger Oates Design is a British company that designs, manufactures and retails flooring, fabric and interior products. The company is best known for Venetian Flatweave, a narrow width wool floorcovering usually fitted as a stair runner.

== Company history ==
Roger Oates, a graduate in Industrial Carpet Design met his wife Fay Morgan, a textile graduate, at the Royal College of Art. They began designing and working together and in 1977 founded the partnership Morgan & Oates designing rugs, throws and scarves for the interior design trade.

In 1989 Oates and Morgan founded Roger Oates Design Associates, the studio employed several handloom weavers and hand-tufters producing rugs and carpets. In 1993 the company, now Roger Oates Design Co Ltd moved to "The Long Barn" on the Eastnor Castle Estate, near Ledbury, Herefordshire. Previously derelict barns were converted to offices, design studios and workshops. The company's first retail showroom opened on this site in 1994.

In 1999 a showroom was opened in Chelsea, London. In 2022 the brand return to the town where they were founded, opening a showroom in the historic market town of Ledbury, Herefordshire.

In 2003 Roger Oates Design added a range of furnishing fabrics to its product line.

The company launched an online shop in 2014, selling a selection of home accessories including, furniture, cushions, bedlinen, throws and rugs. In 2015, in addition to the Roger Oates showrooms, products are sold by retailers and interior designers in the United Kingdom, Europe, Scandinavia, United States and Australia.

In 2016, Roger Oates Design was acquired by Ulster Carpets, in a deal advised by M&A Advisor BCMS.

In 2023 Roger Oates Design began using 100% British traceable wool in all products, sourced by The Woolkeepers from a cooperative of UK farmers. The long term social goal behind Woolkeepers farm traceability is to support a campaign which connects the supply chain from end to end, nurtures land transformation and ultimately uses wool to reverse climate change.

== Venetian Flatweave ==
Since 1993 Roger Oates Design has designed, manufactured and sold Venetian flatweave, woven in the United Kingdom on specially adapted narrow width looms for floor runners and rugs. The 100% wool heavy woven fabric is fitted onto staircases by trained installers, and can be fitted around corners and on winding stairs. The warp is always striped, and so the company produces a variety of stripe designs. A line of tartan fabrics has also been created.

In 2010 the company launched the Real Shetland Wool Flatweave Collection, made using British wool. The company became a supporter of The Prince of Wales' Campaign for Wool The company's wool carpets have been praised as eco-friendly because wool is biodegradable.

== Hand Tufted Rugs ==
In 2020 the company launched a new collection of hand tufted rugs, manufactured in the UK using 100% British wool.
