= Copley baronets of Sprotbrough (2nd creation, 1778) =

Escutcheon of the Copley baronets of Sprotbrough, second creation

The Copley baronetcy of Sprotbrough in Yorkshire was created, for the second time, on 27 August 1778, for Joseph Copley né Moyle, grandson of Sir Godfrey Copley, 2nd Baronet of the first creation. He was the son of Catherine Copley, daughter of the 2nd Baronet, and her spouse Joseph Moyle the elder; a Clerk of the Signet, he was heir in 1766 to the Sprotbrough estate, and at this point changed his surname to Copley.

The 2nd Baronet was Member of Parliament for Tregony from 1796 to 1802. The title became extinct on the death in 1883 of the 4th Baronet.

== Copley baronets, of Sprotbrough (2nd creation, 1778) ==
- Sir Joseph Copley, 1st Baronet (died 1781)
- Sir Lionel Copley, 2nd Baronet (c.1767–1806)
- Sir Joseph Copley, 3rd Baronet (c.1769–1838)
- Sir Joseph William Copley, 4th Baronet (1804–1883)

== Notes ==
Baronetage of Great Britain
Preceded by James baronets	Copley baronets of Sprotbrough; 28 August 1778	Succeeded by Lloyd baronets
