= Baron Somers =

Barony in the Peerage of Great Britain

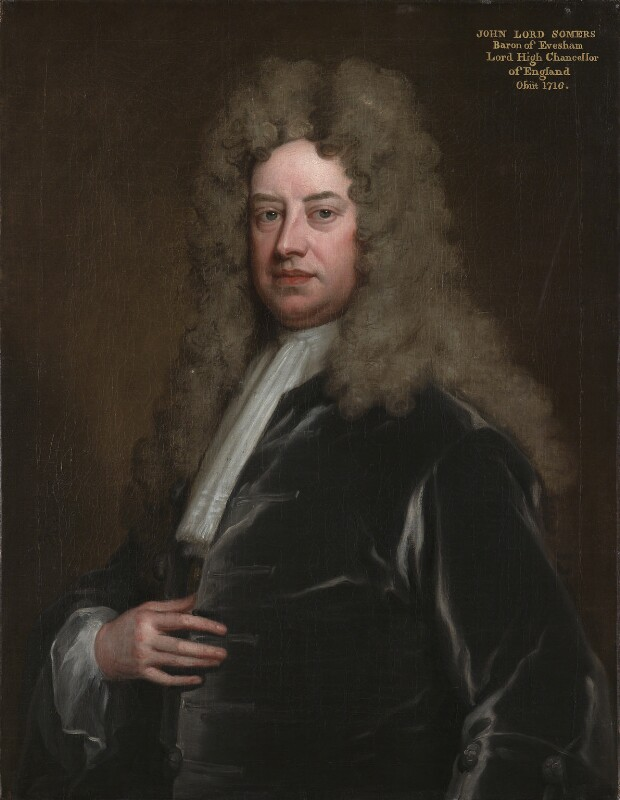
John Somers, 1st Baron Somers

Baron Somers, of Evesham in the County of Worcester, is a title that has been created twice. The title was first created in the Peerage of England in 1697 for Sir John Somers, so that he could sit in the House of Lords and serve as Lord Chancellor. The title became extinct on Lord Somers' death in 1716.

His sister and co-heiress, Mary Somers, married Charles Cocks, of a prominent Worcestershire family. Their grandson Charles Cocks represented Reigate in Parliament from 1747 to 1784, and was created a baronet, of Dumbleton in the County of Gloucester, in 1772. In 1784 the barony held by his great-uncle was revived in his favour.

His eldest son, the second Baron, sat as a Member of Parliament for West Looe, Grampound, and Reigate, and also served as Lord Lieutenant of Herefordshire. In 1821 he was created Viscount Eastnor and Earl Somers. Both titles were in the Peerage of the United Kingdom.

He was succeeded by his son, the second Earl, who represented Reigate and Hereford in the House of Commons and served as Lord Lieutenant of Herefordshire. In 1841 he assumed by Royal licence the additional surname of Somers. His son, the third Earl, sat as a Conservative Member of Parliament for Reigate.

However, on his death in 1883 the earldom and viscountcy became extinct. The barony and baronetcy passed to his first cousin once removed, the fifth Baron. On his death, the title went to his great-nephew, the sixth Baron, who served as Governor of Victoria.

He was succeeded by his uncle, the seventh Baron. His son, the eighth Baron, was a professor at the Royal College of Music. On his death in 1995, the titles passed to his second cousin once removed, the ninth and (As of 2019) present holder of the barony and baronetcy.

The ancestral seat of the Cocks family was Eastnor Castle in Herefordshire. It is now held by a female-line descendant of the sixth Baron.

The title of the barony is pronounced "Summers".

== Barons Somers, first creation (1697) ==
- John Somers, 1st Baron Somers (1651–1716)

== Barons Somers, second creation (1784) ==
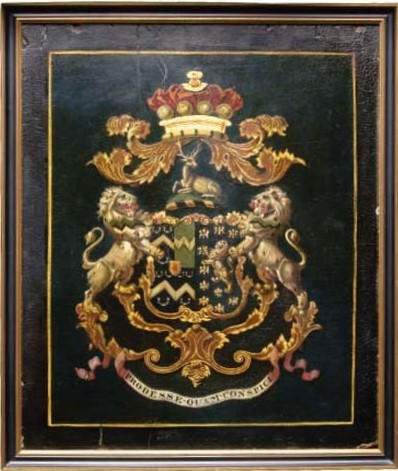
A panel with the coat of arms of Charles Cocks, 1st Baron Somers, displaying his arms impaling the paternal arms of his second wife, Anne Pole.

- Charles Cocks, 1st Baron Somers (1725–1806)
- John Somers Cocks, 2nd Baron Somers (1760–1841) (created Earl Somers in 1821)

=== Earl Somers (1821) ===
- John Somers Cocks, 1st Earl Somers (1760–1841)
- John Somers Somers-Cocks, 2nd Earl Somers (1788–1852)
- Charles Somers Somers-Cocks, 3rd Earl Somers (1819–1883)

=== Barons Somers, second creation (1784; reverted) ===
- Philip Reginald Cocks, 5th Baron Somers (1815–1899)
- Arthur Herbert Tennyson Somers-Cocks, 6th Baron Somers (1887–1944)
- Arthur Percy Somers Cocks, 7th Baron Somers (1864–1953)
- John Patrick Somers Cocks, 8th Baron Somers (1907–1995)
- Philip Sebastian Somers-Cocks, 9th Baron Somers (born 1948)

The heir presumptive to the barony is the present holder's fourth cousin three times removed, Jonathan Bromley Cocks (b. 1985). He is a seventh-generation descendant of Reginald Cocks, the youngest son of the first Baron.

== Arms ==
Coat of arms of Baron Somers
Notes Arms, crest, and supporters as recorded in A Genealogical and Heraldic History of the Peerage and Baronetage (Burke, 1909). Crest On a mount proper, a stag lodged reguardant argent, attired sable. Escutcheon Sable, a chevron between three stags' attires argent. Supporters On each side a lion ermine, gorged with a collar indented vert. Motto Prodesse quam conspici

Baronetage of Great Britain
Preceded by Harland baronets	Cocks baronets of Dumbleton; 7 October 1772	Succeeded by Blake baronets
