= John Buller (politician, born 1745) =

British politician (1745–1793)

Member of the Great Britain Parliament for Exeter
- In office 1768–1774 Serving with John Walter
- Preceded by: William Spicer; John Walter
- Succeeded by: Sir Charles Bampfylde; John Rolle Walter

Member of the Great Britain Parliament for Launceston
- In office 1774–1780 Serving with Humphry Morice
- Preceded by: William Amherst; Humphry Morice
- Succeeded by: James Cecil; Thomas Bowlby

Member of the Great Britain Parliament for West Looe
- In office 1780–1782 Serving with Sir William James
- Preceded by: Sir William James; John Rogers
- Succeeded by: John Cocks; Sir William James
- In office 1784–1784 Serving with John Cocks
- Preceded by: Sir William James; John Cocks
- Succeeded by: John Scott-Waring; John Lemon

Personal details
- Born: 1745
- Died: 26 November 1793 (aged 47–48)

John Buller (1745–1793), was a British politician who sat in the House of Commons between 1768 and 1784 and was an active agent in various Cornish constituencies..

Buller was the son of James Buller and his second wife Lady Jane Bathurst daughter of Allen Bathurst, 1st Earl Bathurst and was baptized on 28 February 1745. He matriculated at Balliol College, Oxford on 18 January 1764.

In the 1768 general election Buller was returned unopposed as Member of Parliament for Exeter on the corporation interest. He married Anne Lemon, daughter of William Lemon of Carclew and sister of Sir William Lemon, 1st Baronet on 3 April 1770. Some time before 1774, probably on the death of his half-brother James in 1772, Buller took over the management at West Looe constituency, where he was able to arrange the return of two Members. He also began interfering in other constituencies, not necessarily for his own return but to affect the outcome of the poll.

In the 1774 general election he stood for Parliament at Cornwall and Launceston. He stood at Cornwall in order to draw votes away the opponents of his brother in law William Lemon and came third, but he was returned as MP at Launceston. After inheriting property at Saltash, he contested the borough in 1780, but only so could surrender it for the wardenship of the stannaries. He was defeated but petitioned, and a committee of the House of Commons decided against him only by the chairman's casting vote. At the same time he was able to return himself as MP at West Looe. He resigned his seat there in 1782 and in 1783 he again contested Saltash but was defeated and had his petition rejected again. He returned himself briefly for West Looe when one of the members died in 1784. In the 1784 general election he stood at Exeter again and was defeated. His involvement at Saltash in the 1784 election was on behalf of John Lemon who after petitions and disputes about voting rights was eventually returned in 1787. In the 1790 general election Buller did not stand but was able to return Government supporters both at Saltash and at West Looe. He was appointed a commissioner of Excise in 1790.

Buller died on 26 November 1793.

== Sources ==
Parliament of Great Britain
Preceded by William Spicer; John Rolle Walter	Member of Parliament for Exeter; 1768– 1774; With: John Rolle Walter	Succeeded by Sir Charles Warwick Bampfylde; John Rolle Walter
Preceded by William Amherst; Humphry Morice	Member of Parliament for Launceston; 1774– 1780; With: Humphry Morice	Succeeded by Viscount Cranborne; Thomas Bowlby
Preceded by Sir William James; John Rogers	Member of Parliament for West Looe; 1780–1782; With: Sir William James	Succeeded by Sir William James; John Somers Cocks
Preceded by Sir William James; John Somers Cocks	Member of Parliament for West Looe; 1784–1784; With: John Somers Cocks	Succeeded by John Scott; John Lemon
