= John Rogers (1750–1832) =

British lawyer and politician

John Rogers (15 August 1750 – 22 February 1832) was a British lawyer and politician from Cornwall who sat in the House of Commons between 1775 and 1786.

== Early life ==
Rogers was the only son of Hugh Rogers of Penrose and his wife Anne Bishop, daughter of James Bishop of St. Columb Major, Cornwall and was born on 15 August 1750. He matriculated at Trinity College, Oxford on 11 June 1768 and entered Inner Temple in 1771. He married Margaret Basset, daughter of Francis Basset on 30 September 1776.

== Political career ==
In 1774 Rogers contested Penryn, possibly on the Basset interest but was unsuccessful. He was returned as Member of Parliament for West Looe at a by-election on 7 June 1775. At the 1780 general election he was returned as MP for Penryn, but resigned two years later in November 1782. He was then elected MP for Helston in the 1784 general election. In 1785 he became Recorder of Helston and held the position until his death. He resigned his seat in Parliament in March 1786.

== Later years ==
Rogers died on 22 February 1832. His eldest son, John Rogers (17 July 1778 – 12 June 1856), was an Anglican priest, mine-owner, botanist, mineralogist, and scholar of Hebrew and Syriac.

Parliament of Great Britain
Preceded by Sir William James; Charles Ogilvie	Member of Parliament for West Looe; 1775–1780; With: Sir William James	Succeeded by Sir William James; John Buller
Preceded by Sir George Osborn; William Chaytor	Member of Parliament for Penryn; 1780–1782; With: Francis Basset 1780–96	Succeeded by Reginald Pole-Carew
Preceded by Richard Barwell	Member of Parliament for Helston; 1784–1786; With: Lord Hyde 1781–86	Succeeded by Roger Wilbraham; James Burges
