= Charles Ogilvie (merchant) =

British planter, merchant and politician

Charles Ogilvie (c. 1731 – 1788) was a British planter, merchant and politician who represented West Looe in the House of Commons of Great Britain from 1774 to 1775.

== Early life ==
Ogilvie was the fourth son of James Ogilvie of Auchiries, Aberdeen and his wife Margaret Strachan. He emigrated to South Carolina and by 1755 he was a member of the import/export firm, Ogilvie and Ward at Charleston. He married Mary Michie, daughter of James Michie, chief justice of South Carolina in about 1760. By marriage and purchase he acquired plantations which produced mainly rice but also indigo. Ogilvie became friendly with Alexander Garden, a Scottish botanist in Charles Town. In 1761 Ogilvie returned to Britain to manage the London end of a new firm of Charles Ogilvie and John Forbes. He had letters of introduction from Garden, and was to act as his agent, while Garden would look after his estates in South Carolina. In 1774 Ogilvie took his nephew George Ogilvie to South Carolina’ Carolina. He then left Carolina for England late June 1774 leaving his nephew George to look after the business in Carolina. George was supported by Garden and eventually acquired his own estates.

== Political career ==
Ogilvie was returned as Member of Parliament for West Looe at the 1774 general election. In May 1775 he resigned his seat, possibly because the interruption of trade had affected his financial position.

== Later life and legacy ==
Ogilvie went back to Carolina after the war in 1784 and petitioned the South Carolina General Assembly for the return of his plantations. The Alexandria Plantation in Beaufort county was eventually returned to his sons, Charles and John, although 499 acres had already been sold to an American officer whereas the Richfield plantation was eventually fully returned to his sons. Ogilvie himself did not revisit Carolina, although his children settled there. Ogilvie died in 1788 some time before 18 October.

Parliament of Great Britain
Preceded by James Townsend; William Graves	Member of Parliament for West Looe; 1774–1775; With: Sir William James	Succeeded by Sir William James; John Rogers
