= Sir William James, 1st Baronet =

Bombay Marine officer and politician (1721–1783)

Commodore Sir William James Bt
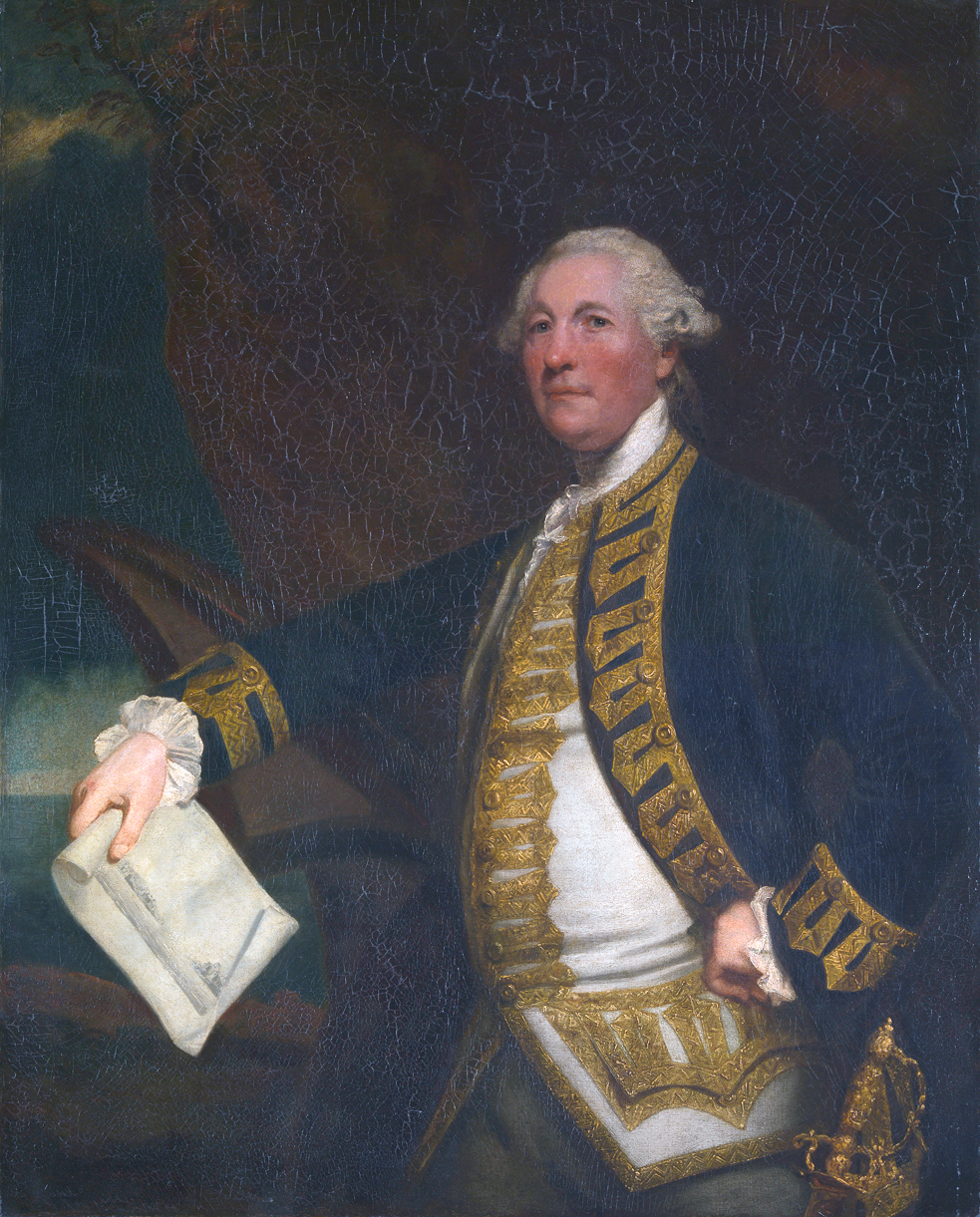
- Portrait by Sir Joshua Reynolds, 1784

Member of Parliament for West Looe
- In office 1774–1783
- Preceded by: James Townsend; William Graves
- Succeeded by: John Cocks; John Buller

Personal details
- Born: 5 September 1722 Pembrokeshire, Wales
- Died: 16 December 1783 (aged 61) London, England
- Spouse: Anne Goddard (m. 1765)
- Children: 2

Military service
- Allegiance: East India Company
- Branch/service: Bombay Marine
- Years of service: 1747–1759
- Rank: Commodore
- Commands: HCS Guardian; HCS Protector
- Battles/wars: Fall of Severndroog; Battle of Vijaydurg

Commodore Sir William James, 1st Baronet (5 September 1722 – 16 December 1783) was a Bombay Marine officer and politician who represented West Looe in the House of Commons of Great Britain from 1774 to 1783. Born in Pembrokeshire, Wales to a family of unclear background, James went to sea at a young age and worked onboard merchant ships which traded between Britain's Southern Colonies and the West Indies, during which he was captured by the Spanish during the War of the Austrian Succession. James eventually returned to England at some point in the early 1740s and possibly married either the landlady of a Wapping public house or a widow named Elizabeth Birch; historical records are not fully clear if James actually married during this period.

In 1747, James joined the Bombay Marine, the navy of the East India Company (EIC). He served as the first mate onboard the East Indiaman Hardwicke and Suffolk for two years before being promoted to captain in 1749. Commanding a small Bombay Marine squadron, he patrolled the Malabar Coast for two years, defeating a Maratha Navy fleet under Tulaji Angre off Tellicherry in 1749. Promoted to commodore in 1751, he led an expedition against Angre's fleet in 1755, capturing his fortress at Severndroog on 2 April following an extensive offshore bombardment. In concert with a Royal Navy squadron, James also participated in the capture of Vijaydurg Fort from Angre in February 1756. He left the Bombay Marine in 1759 and returned to Great Britain a wealthy man.

James settled down in Eltham, Kent after arriving back in England and married a woman named Anne Goddard. In 1768, he was elected as a director of the East India Company. A prominent supporter of the Grafton ministry, James unsuccessfully ran for election in a 1770 parliamentary by-election for New Shoreham. In the 1774 general election, he was elected to represent West Looe, and over the next several years later James was repeatedly chosen to serve as the chairman and deputy chairman of the EIC. James died at his townhouse at Gerrard Street in 1783 of a stroke. His son Edward succeeded his baronetcy but died unmarried in 1792, while James' daughter Elizabeth married the British Army officer Thomas Parkyns and went on to have nine children.

== Early life ==
William James was born on 5 September 1722 near the town of Milford Haven in Pembrokeshire, Wales. Information about his parents is extremely scarce, with the British politician and historian Sir Nathaniel Wraxall writing in his memoirs that "[James'] origin was so obscure as almost to baffle inquiry." The scholar T. H. Bowyer noted that James was most likely the son of a miller from Bolton, though some sources have claimed that his father was a farmhand, with James being employed as a ploughboy. All historical sources agree that James began his career at sea from a young age, reportedly when he was 12 years old. The Indian Navy officer Charles Rathbone Low claimed in 1877 that James pursued this career path due to growing tired of his life on land.

Details of James early career at sea are likewise obscure; as noted by Bowyer, "there is no unanimity about the course of his early career as a mariner." He may have first apprenticed himself to a coastal trading vessel operating out of Bristol, with Low claiming that in 1738 James had joined the Royal Navy as a cabin boy and served under Captain Edward Hawke, though in that year Hawke was on shore at half-pay. During this period, he sailed onboard merchantmen which traded between the Southern Colonies and the West Indies, and "suffered shipwreck and imprisonment by the Spanish", the latter as a result of the ongoing War of the Austrian Succession. Bowyer noted that this meant James couldn't have "received much in the way of formal education".

James returned to England during the early 1740s. There he possibly married, though the identity of James' possible wife is not certain. Historical accounts claim that James either married the landlady of a Wapping pub or the widow of a sea captain who sailed East Indiamen. Though no evidence has emerged to confirm or deny the first account, London marriage records list an Elizabeth Birch marrying a William James at St Anne's Church in Soho, London on 1 May 1744. This Birch had been previously married to a William Birch, an East India Company (EIC) sea captain who was no longer listed in EIC records following 1736. The possibility that groom in this marriage was James is consistent with the British historian John Pavin Phillips' 1861 biography of him.

== Career in India ==
In 1747, James joined the Bombay Marine, the navy of the East India Company. He was appointed as first mate onboard the EIC East Indiaman Hardwicke before being transferred to the East Indiaman Suffolk two years later. James was promoted to captain in 1749 and appointed the commander of the 28-gun frigate HCS Guardian, which was part of a small squadron that operated between Bombay and Goa to protect EIC merchant shipping from attacks by Maratha Navy ships under Tulaji Angre. In that year, James, while escorting 70 coastal trading vessels from Bombay to Goa, encountered a Maratha fleet of 16 grabs and gallivats under Angre. James immediately ordered his ships to sail for the port of Tellicherry; once they arrived there, James' squadron, consisting of Guardian, the 28-gun grab HCS Bombay and the bomb vessel HCS Drake, launched a counter-attack against Angre's fleet, sinking its largest gallivat and driving other Maratha ships back before returning to Bombay.

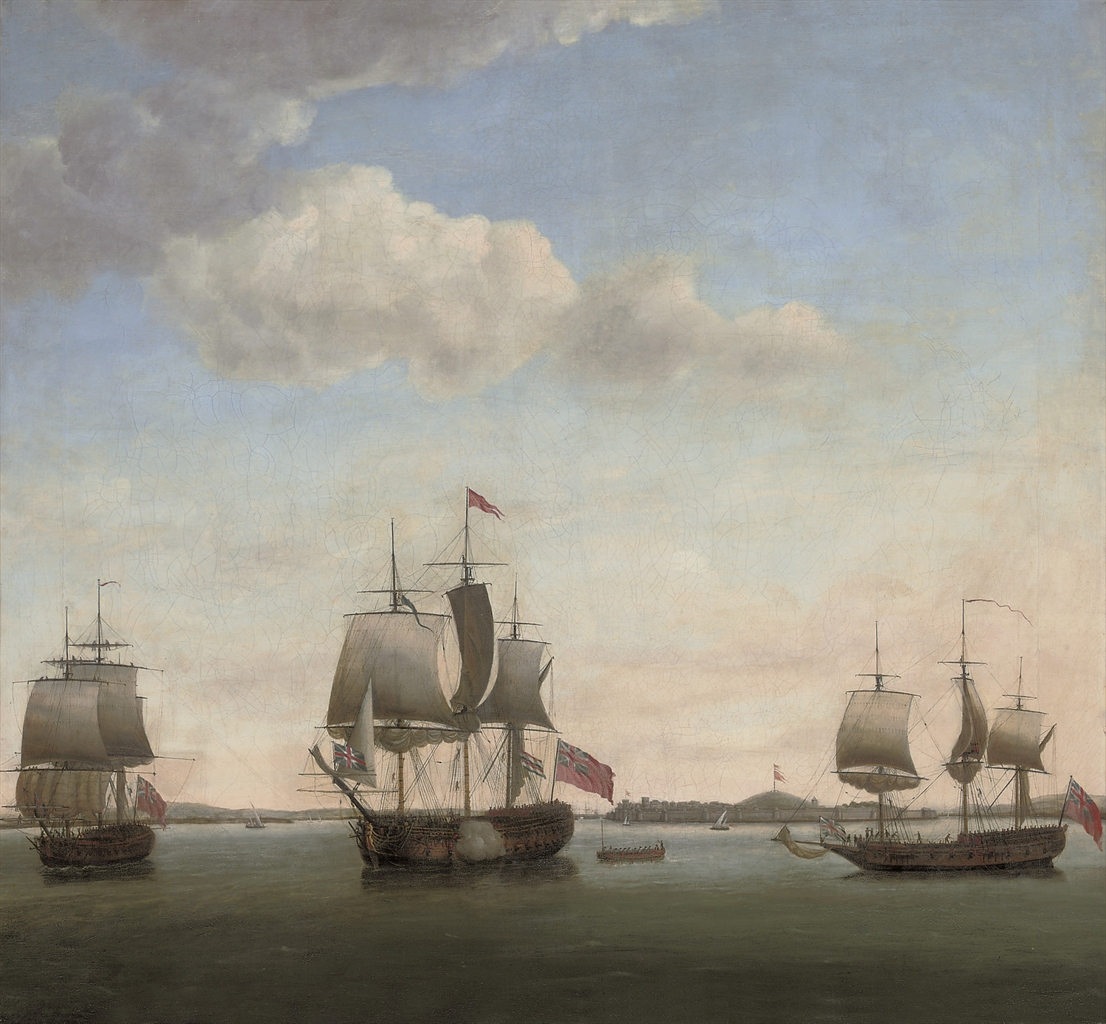
Painting of James' squadron near Severndroog by Francis Holman

Emboldened by his victory, James continued to lead his squadron in patrols off the coasts of Konkan and Kanara, with Angre halting his attacks on the EIC's merchant shipping for a period of time. As a result of his successes in reducing EIC losses, James was promoted to commodore in 1751, which effectively made him the commander-in-chief of the entire Bombay Marine. He was also placed in command of the 44-gun fifth-rate warship HCS Protector, which had been built for the Bombay Marine at the Bombay Dockyard to protect EIC trade routes on the Malabar Coast. In February 1754, Angre attacked three Dutch East India Company merchant ships, burning two and capturing the third. This led EIC officials to draft plans to eliminate Angre as a future threat.

The EIC proceeded to join forces with the Maratha Empire, whose Peshwa, Balaji Baji Rao, had been angered by Angre's refusal to recognise him as his overlord. In March 1755, James departed from Bombay leading a squadron that consisted of Protector, Bombay, the 16-gun HCS Swallow and the bomb vessels HCS Triumph and HCS Viper to link up with the Maratha army and attack Angre's fortresses at Vijaydurg and Severndroog. Three days after setting sail, he linked up with a Maratha fleet of seven grabs and six gallivats which contained 10,000 soldiers onboard. As the EIC was still apprehensive of the strength of Angre's forces, James superiors had ordered him not to directly attack either fortress with his ships but instead rely on the Maratha soldiers.

Having learned that Angre's fleet was lying at anchor in Severndroog, James sailed his squadron there in the evening of 1 April. During the early hours of the next day, Angre's ships sighted Protector and proceeded to slip their cables and sail out to sea. James sent several ship's boats, which reported there was enough water near the fortress for his bomb vessels to attack Severndroog. He ordered the vessels to bombard the fortress, and after British mortar fire destroyed its powder magazine, 1,000 occupants of the fort tried to escape but were intercepted by James' squadron and forced to surrender. By 8 April, all of Angre's local fortresses and outposts had surrendered. James handed Severndroog over to the Marathas before returning to Bombay on 15 April in order to avoid seasonal monsoons.

In November 1755, a Royal Navy squadron commanded by Rear-admiral Charles Watson arrived in Bombay, linking up with James and EIC troops led by Colonel Robert Clive. The British decided to mount another expedition against Angre, who still held the fortress at Vijaydurg. In January 1756, a British expeditionary force, which included Protector under James' command, set sail from Bombay to Vijaydurg. The expeditionary force captured the fortress in February, destroying most of Angre's fleet. Although the British eventually again handed over the fortress to their Maratha allies, 130,000 rupees worth of loot fell into the expeditionary force's hands. In 1757, James, who was in Bombay, was charged by his superiors with informing Watson, who was commanding a squadron near the French Indian city of Chandernagore, of the outbreak of war between Great Britain and France. James continued serving in the Bombay Marine until 1759, when he left it and returned to England.

== Later life and death ==
James arrived in England as a wealthy man, having made a fortune through private business dealings and prize money. He settled down in Eltham, Kent and on 15 June 1765 married Anne Goddard, the daughter of a gentleman from Wiltshire, at St Marylebone Parish Church in London. Some historical accounts claimed that he married a native woman in India and had a son with her, which Bowyer dismisses as baseless while conceding that "there may well have been a natural son". In 1768, James was elected as a director of the East India Company due to his support for the EIC official and politician Laurence Sulivan. As a director, James soon began cultivating a friendship with the British statesman John Montagu, 4th Earl of Sandwich, "whose influence brought him the honours that he enjoyed." James became an elder brother of Trinity House, Britain's national lighthouse authority, on 22 July 1769, and was also appointed as a governor of the Royal Naval Hospital at Greenwich.

As a prominent supporter of the Grafton ministry among the EIC's directors, James began to make efforts to get elected to the House of Commons of Great Britain. He ran for election in a parliamentary by-election for New Shoreham in 1770, but was defeated. James proceeded to attempt to be appointed as the governor of Bombay, but as he had already made his parliamentary ambitions clear within government circles, James withdrew his candidature and in the 1774 British general election was elected to represent West Looe in the House of Commons. In the same year, Anne gave birth to a son named Edward, and James purchased Park Farm Place, an English country house in Eltham. In the House of Commons, James supported Sandwich and the rest of the North ministry. However, his relationship with Sulivan started to deteriorate when, under government pressure, James voted to recall the EIC official Warren Hastings. In 1776, James was elected as the EIC's deputy chairman.

On 15 June 1778, James was appointed as the deputy master of Trinity House, and on 27 August was granted a baronetcy by the Crown and re-elected as the EIC's deputy chairman. He was elected as chairman of the East India Company in 1779, and by 1781 James' relation with Sulivan had improved to the point where he was again chosen as deputy chairman during Sulivan's chairmanship. In 1782, a parliamentary committee established to examine the EIC's operations in the Bengal Presidency drafted a report which alleged that James and Sulivan had deliberately misled the committee by altering EIC records. James opposed a motion to publish the report, maintaining that its allegations against him were "without foundation". On 16 December 1783, James died of a sudden stroke at his townhouse in Gerrard Street, London, the same day that his daughter Elizabeth married the British Army officer Thomas Boothby Parkyns. James was subsequently buried at Eltham in 22 December.

Edward succeeded to James' title after his death, though as he died unmarried in 1792 the family baronetcy became extinct. Elizabeth had nine children with Parkyns, who was elevated to the peerage of Ireland in 1795 as the Baron Rancliffe. After James died, Anne commissioned the English architect Richard Jupp to design Severndroog Castle, a triangular Gothic folly built in 1784. The building was constructed at the summit of Shooter's Hill near Blackheath, and was intended by Anne to serve as a memorial to her husband, being named after the site of his most famous victory. The historians David Cordingly and John Falconer view James' victories over Angre as marking a turning point for the fortunes of the East India Company in establishing naval supremacy in India, as Severndroog and Vijaydurg ceased to be a threat to EIC merchant shipping. Cordingly and Falconer attributed James' victories to the EIC's superior ship-making skills compared to that of Angre's.

Parliament of Great Britain
Preceded by James Townsend; William Graves	Member of Parliament for West Looe; 1774–1783; With: Charles Ogilvie 1774–1775; John Rogers 1775–1780; John Buller 1780–1782; John Cocks 1782–1783	Succeeded by John Cocks; John Buller
Baronetage of Great Britain
New title	Baronet (of Eltham, Kent); 1778–1783	Succeeded by Edward William James
