= Eastnor Castle =

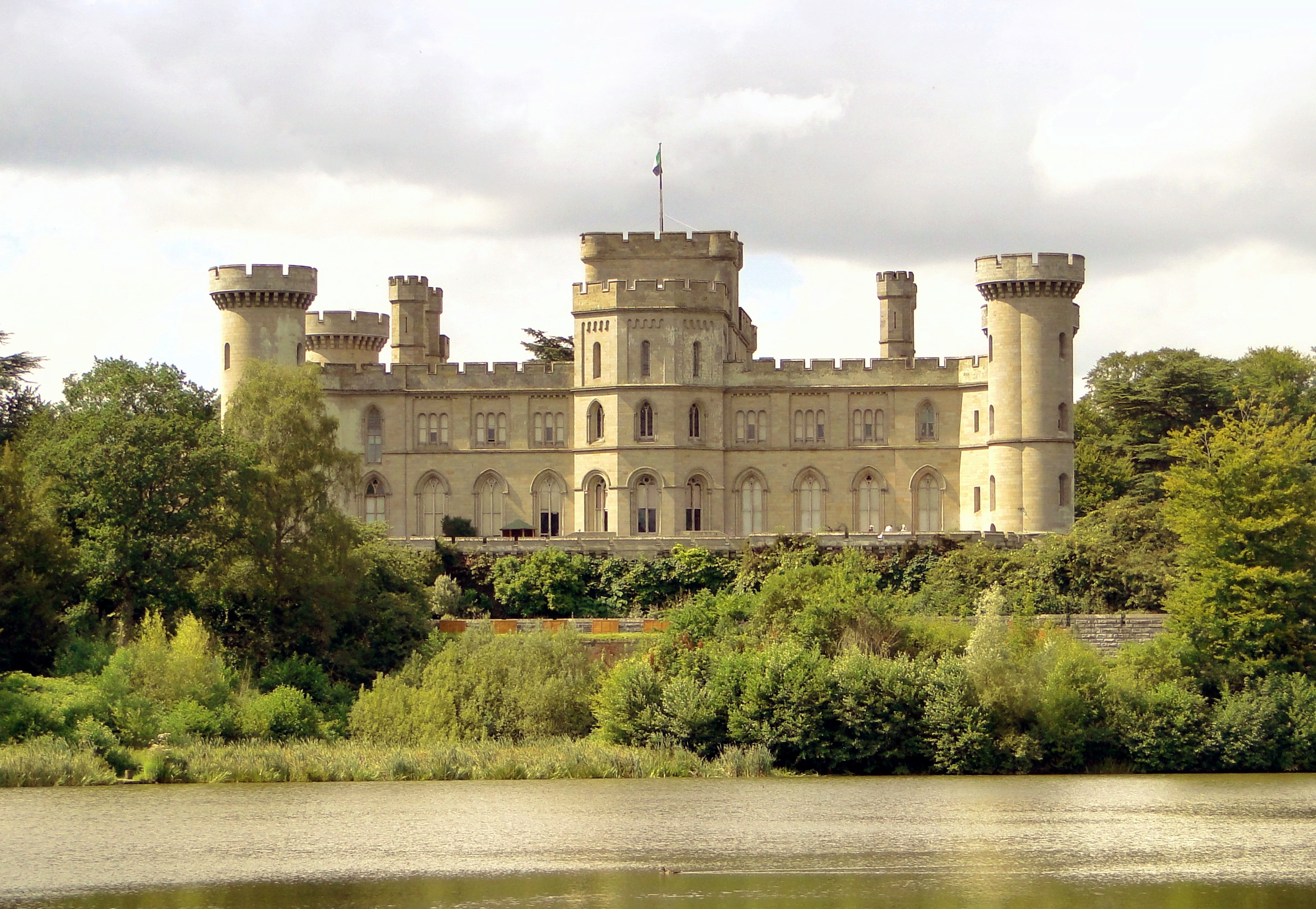

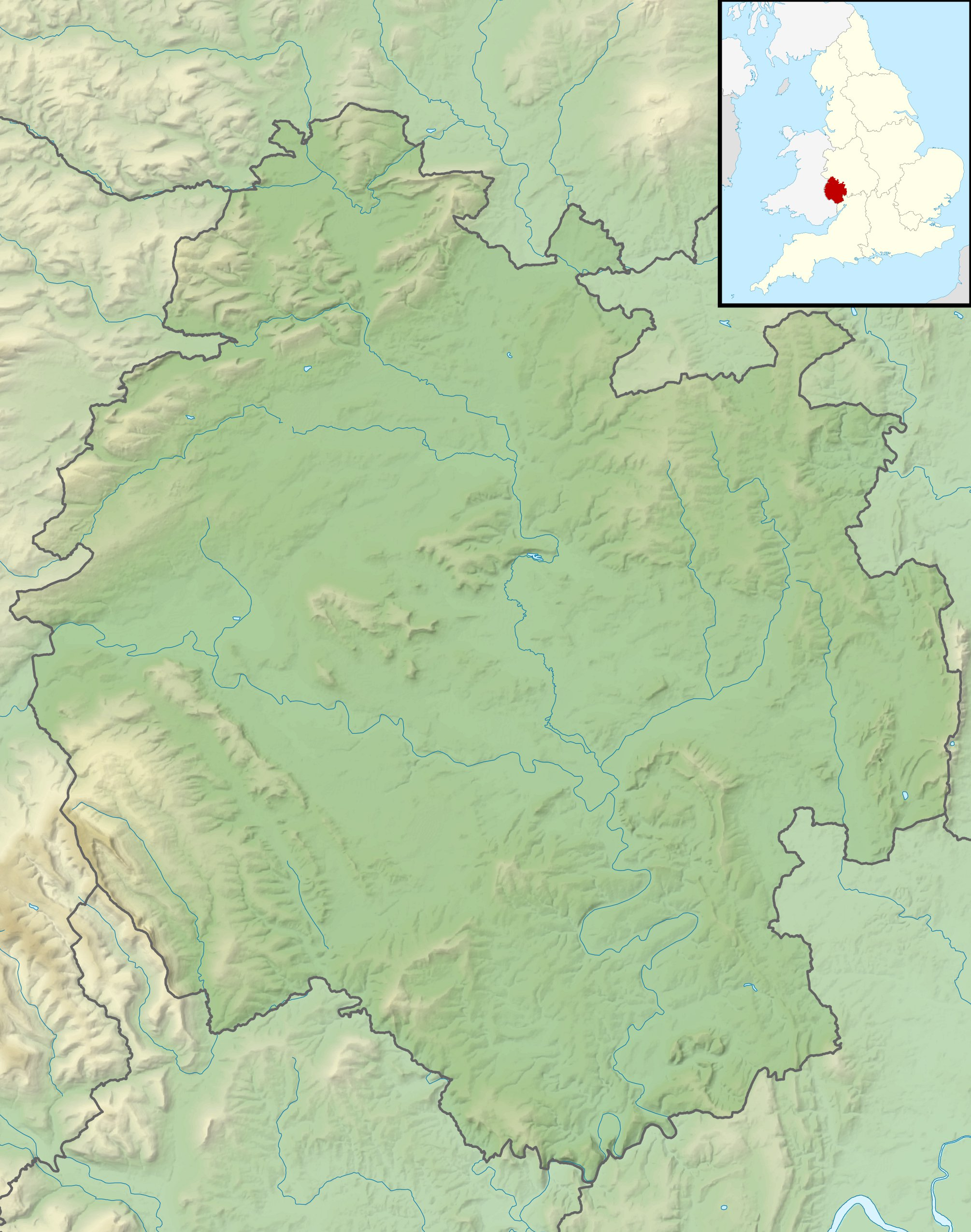
- Location within Herefordshire
- 52.0297°N 2.3877°W
- Type: Mock castle
- Location: Eastnor, Herefordshire

History
- Built: 1811-1820

Site notes
- Architect: Robert Smirke
- Architectural style: Gothic Revival
- Governing body: Privately owned

Listed Building – Grade I
- Official name: Eastnor Castle
- Designated: 18 November 1952
- Reference no.: 1156712

Listed Building – Grade II
- Official name: Castle lodge and gates
- Designated: 10 January 1986
- Reference no.: 1156692

Listed Building – Grade II
- Official name: Portcullis lodge and retaining walls to the forecourt of Eastnor Castle
- Designated: 10 January 1986
- Reference no.: 1082629

Listed Building – Grade II
- Official name: Retaining wall to Lower Terrace on garden front of Eastnor Castle
- Designated: 10 January 1986
- Reference no.: 1082630

Listed Building – Grade II
- Official name: Retaining wall to Upper Terrace on garden front of Eastnor Castle
- Designated: 10 January 1986
- Reference no.: 1349512

Eastnor Castle, Eastnor, Herefordshire, is a 19th-century mock castle. Eastnor was built for John Cocks, 1st Earl Somers, who employed Robert Smirke, later the main architect of the British Museum.

The castle was built between 1811 and 1820. Major schemes of interior decoration were carried out by A. W. N. Pugin in 1849–1850. Eastnor remains a private home, and is currently the residence of James Hervey-Bathurst, the grandson of Arthur Somers-Cocks, 6th Baron Somers. It is a Grade I listed building. The surrounding gardens and parkland are designated Grade II*.

== History ==
The estate was established in the late 16th century when the Cocks family purchased land in the area. Subsequent marriages into the Somers and Nash families helped provide the wealth and substance necessary to build the present imposing building, designed to look like one of the medieval castles guarding the Welsh borders.

The castle was built to the designs of Robert Smirke in 1812–20. A.W.N. Pugin made some internal alterations – including the decoration of the Gothic drawing room – in 1849–50, and George E. Fox made further changes in the 1860s. It is constructed of ashlar stonework, with a lead and slate roof concealed behind an embattled parapet. Cast-iron was used for the roof trusses and floor beams. It was constructed at a cost of £85,000, the equivalent of approximately £5.1 million at 2024 prices.

The castle was criticised by Charles Locke Eastlake later in the 19th century:

It is a massive and gloomy-looking building, flanked by watch-towers, and enclosing a keep. To preserve the character at which it aimed, the windows were made exceedingly small and narrow. This must have resulted in much inconvenience within...The building in question might have made a tolerable fort before the invention of gunpowder, but as a residence it was a picturesque mistake.

In 1944, the estate was the site of Nissen huts used to house American troops in the lead-up to the D-Day landings.

The castle still has an operating flour mill, "one of the oldest in the county", built in the 18th century as Clencher's. In the 21st century, the water supply was "reinstated and the machinery overhauled so it is now workable". As of 2020, the family occupied only a small part of the castle, "smaller rooms, and we mostly live in the kitchen, which was enlarged in 1992", according to James Hervey-Bathurst, who inherited the property from his mother, the Hon. Mrs Elizabeth Hervey-Bathurst, in 1988.

The castle's business was affected for some time in 2020 due to the COVID-19 pandemic but by mid-July 2020, restrictions were easing. The ironwork bridge over the weir, first installed in 1828, was reopened after restoration in 2021. The castle is open to tours by the public in certain months of the year; it is also a wedding venue.

A section of the Berlin Wall was installed in the castle grounds in 2025.

== Eastnor Obelisk ==
In 1812 John Somers-Cocks, 2nd Earl Somers commissioned the construction of an obelisk on the Eastnor estate, to honour various members of his family. The architect was almost certainly Robert Smirke. Family members commemorated with plaques on the monument include John Somers, 1st Baron Somers, who served William III as Lord Chancellor, and Edward Charles Cocks, who was an intelligence officer on the Duke of Wellington’s staff and died during the Siege of Burgos in the Peninsular War in 1812. (Note: Wellesley subsequently wrote to Cocks’ father; “Your son fell, as he had lived, in the zealous and gallant discharge of his duty… if Providence had spared him to you, [he had] acquirements and qualities to become one of the greatest ornaments of his profession, and to continue an honour to his family, and an advantage to his country”.) The obelisk is situated in Eastnor Deer Park just over a mile away from the castle, and is now a Grade II* listed building.

== Media appearances and events ==
The car manufacturer Land Rover uses the Eastnor estate as a venue for potential customers to test-drive their vehicles. The castle has been used as a location for various films, television programmes and music videos, including One More Time, starring Peter Lawford and Sammy Davis Jr, the Slade video "Run Runaway", the 1986 film adaptation of Oscar Wilde's The Canterville Ghost, the BBC TV adaptation of Little Lord Fauntleroy in 1995, the American reality competition programme The Amazing Race, ITV's 2015 adaptation of Doctor Thorne, and two episodes of HBO's Succession.

== Gallery ==
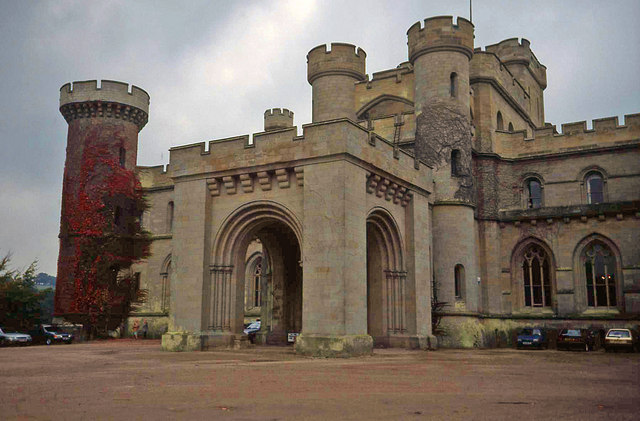
Main entrance to Eastnor Castle in 1992

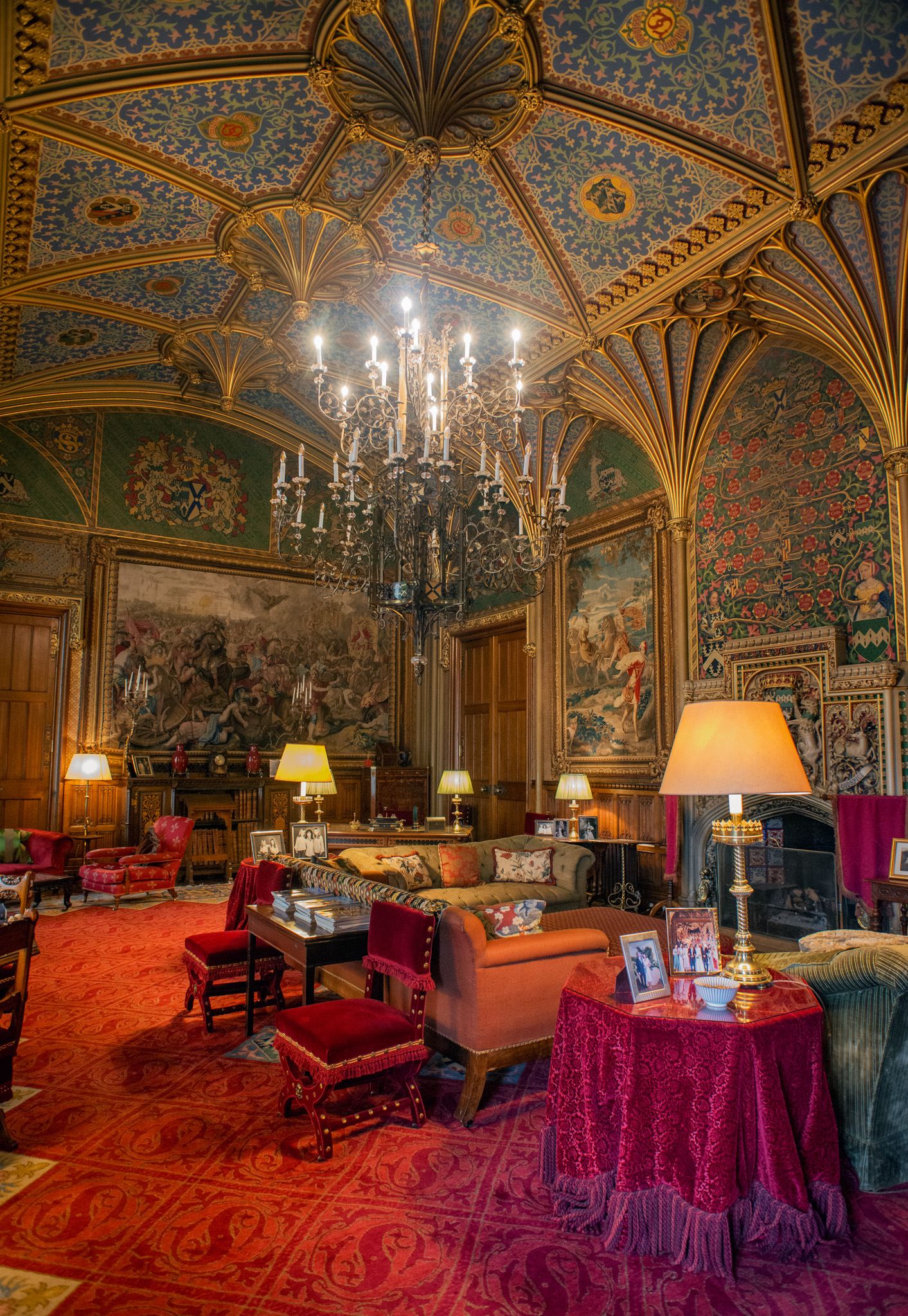
The Gothic Drawing Room

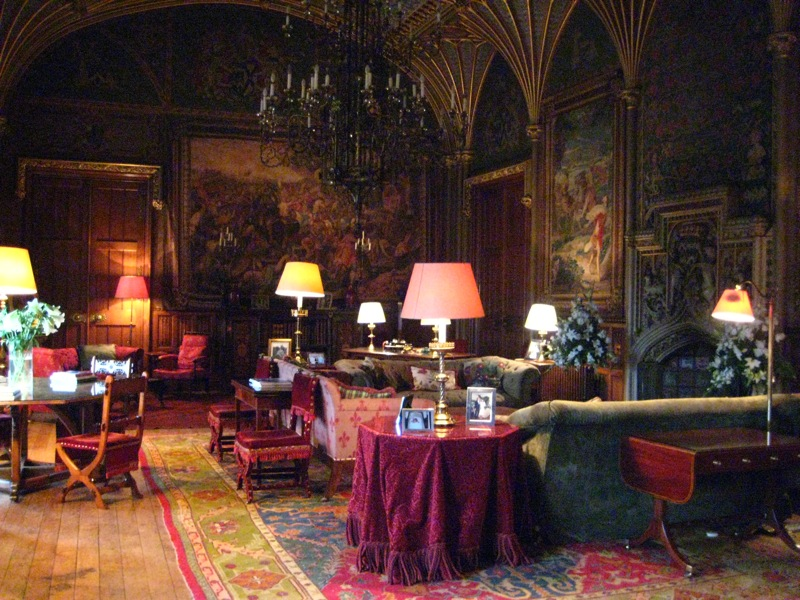
Interior

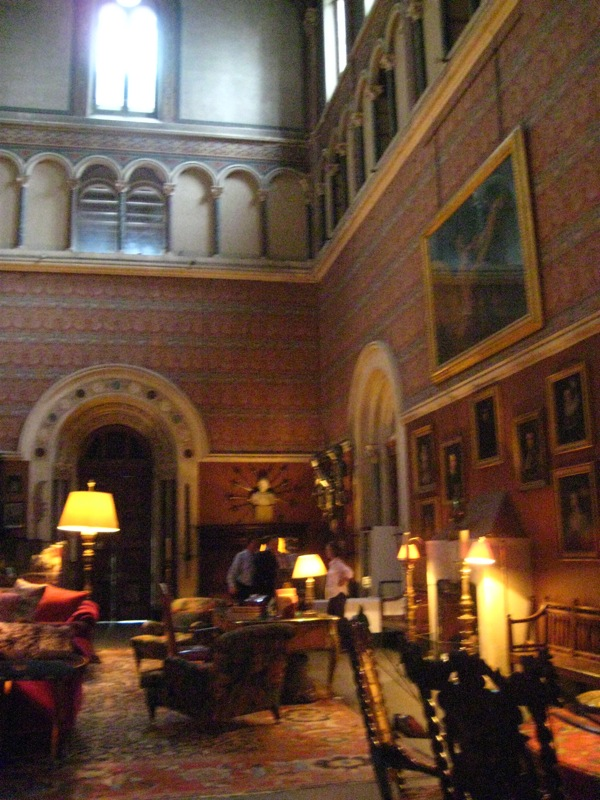
Great hall

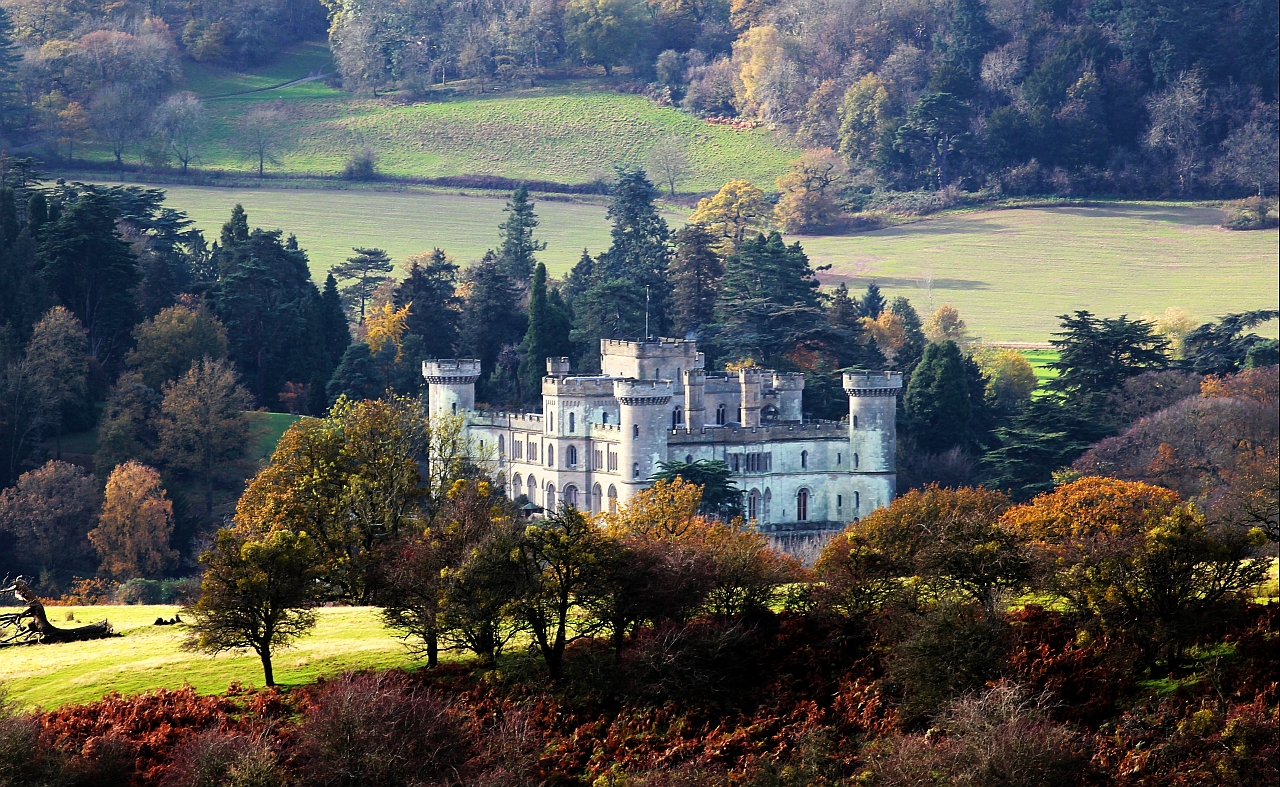
Distant view of the castle

== Sources ==
- Brooks, Alan; Pevsner, Nikolaus (2012). Herefordshire. The Buildings of England. New Haven, US and London: Yale University Press. ISBN 978-0-300-12575-7.
- Eastlake, Charles Locke (2012) [1872]. A History of the Gothic Revival. Cambridge: Cambridge University Press. ISBN 978-1-108-05191-0. OCLC 908267827.
- Muir, Rory (2013). Wellington: The Path to Victory 1769–1814. Vol. 1. New Haven, US and London: Yale University Press. ISBN 978-0-300-20548-0.
