= James baronets of Park Farm Place, Eltham (1778) =

Baronets of Great Britain

James baronets
- Escutcheon of the James Baronets of Park Farm Place, Eltham
- Creation date: 1778
- Status: extinct
- Extinction date: 1792

The James baronetcy, of Park Farm Place in Eltham in the County of Kent, was created in the Baronetage of Great Britain on 27 August 1778 for the naval commander William James. He was Member of Parliament for West Looe from 1774.

The title became extinct on the death of the 2nd Baronet in 1792.

== James baronets, of Park Farm Place, Eltham (1778) ==
- Sir William James, 1st Baronet (c.1721–1783)
- Sir Edward William James, 2nd Baronet (c.1774–1792)

== Notes ==
Baronetage of Great Britain
Preceded by Wombwell baronets	James baronets of Park Farm Place; 27 August 1778	Succeeded by Copley baronets
