= Edward Charles Cocks =

British army officer (1786–1812)

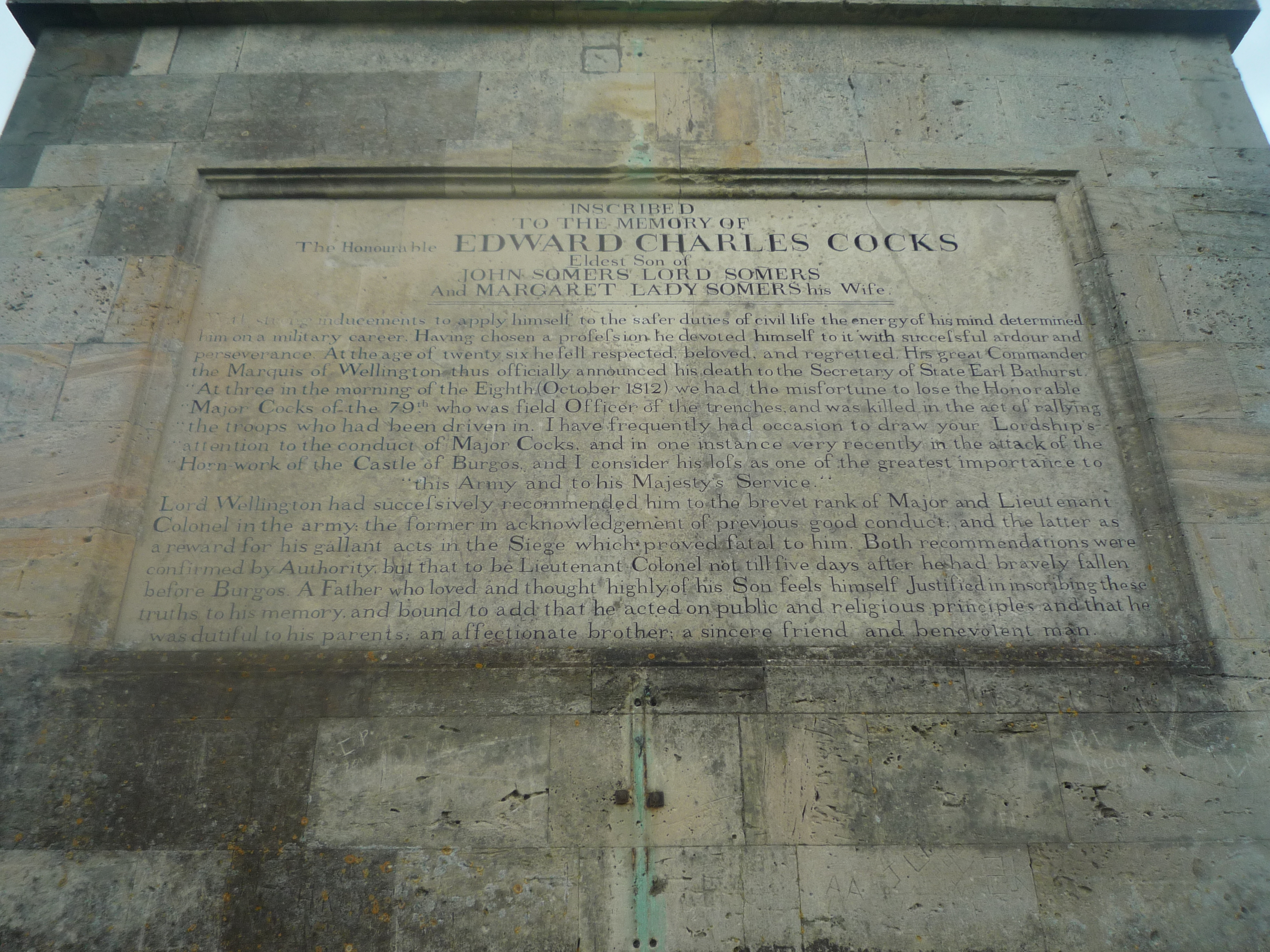
- Plaque commemorating Cocks on the Eastnor Obelisk
- Born: 27 July 1786
- Died: 8 October 1812 (aged 26)
- Military career
- Allegiance: United Kingdom
- Branch: British Army
- Rank: Major

Edward Charles Cocks (27 July 1786 – 8 October 1812) was a British Army officer. He served with Arthur Wellesley, 1st Duke of Wellington in the Peninsular War and was killed at the Siege of Burgos.

== Life ==
Inscribed to the memory of the Honourable Edward Charles Cocks, eldest son of John Somers, Lord Somers and Margaret, Lady Somers, his wife.,
With strong inducements to apply himself to the safer duties of civil life the energy of his mind determined him on a military career. Having chosen a profession he devoted himself to it with successful ardour and perseverance. At the age of twenty six he fell, respected, beloved and regretted. His great Commander the Marquis of Wellington thus officially announced his death to the Secretary of the State, Lord Bathurst, at 3 in the morning of the 8th of October 1812, "We had the misfortune to lose the Hon Major Cocks of the 79th who was field officer of the trenches and was killed in the act of rallying the troops who had been driven in. I have frequently had occasion to draw your Lordship's attention to the conduct of the Major Cocks and in one instance, very recently, in the attack of the Hornwork of the Castle of Burgos and I consider his loss as one of the greatest importance to the army and to his Majesty's Service."
Lord Wellington had successfully recommended him to the Brevet Rank of Major and Lieutenant Colonel in the Army; the former in acknowledgement of previous good conduct and the latter as a reward for his gallant acts in the siege which proved fatal to him. Both recommendations were confirmed by authority but that to be Lieutenant Colonel not till 5 days after he had bravely fallen before Burgos.
A father who loved and thought highly of his son feels justified in inscribing these truths to his memory and bound to add that he acted on public and religious principles and that he was dutiful to his parents, an affectionate brother, a sincere friend and a benevolent man.

— Inscription commemorating Cocks on the Eastnor Obelisk

Cocks was the eldest son of John Cocks, 1st Earl Somers, and served as the Member of Parliament for Reigate from 1806 to 1812.

From December 1808 until 1812, he fought in the Peninsular War where, alongside his regular duties, he worked as an "observing officer". These were officers tasked with probing deep behind enemy lines to collect military intelligence. He died, with the rank of major, leading his men in an attempt to storm a breach at the Siege of Burgos.

Cocks was a great favourite of his commander Arthur Wellesley, the future Duke of Wellington, who admired him for his bravery and intelligence and was greatly affected by his death. Colonel Frederick Ponsonby recalled his encounter with Wellesley shortly after the event; Wellesley entered Ponsonby's room and paced up and down in total silence, much to his junior officer's consternation, before stating quietly: "Cocks is dead". Wellesley subsequently wrote to Cocks' father; "Your son fell, as he had lived, in the zealous and gallant discharge of his duty... if Providence had spared him to you, [he had] acquirements and qualities to become one of the greatest ornaments of his profession, and to continue an honour to his family, and an advantage to his country". Cocks is commemorated on a plaque set into the Eastnor Obelisk, raised by his father in 1812. (Note: Cocks' personal papers, including letters and journals, are held at Eastnor Castle. His war journal, describing his experiences in the Peninsular, is held at the National Library of Wales.)

Cocks kept a diary, running to eleven volumes, extracts from which were published in 1986, along with extracts from his collection of 180 letters, all edited by Julia Page, as Intelligence Officer in the Peninsular: Letters and Diaries of Major The Honourable Edward Charles Cocks 1786-1812.

== Sources ==
- Cocks, Edward Charles (1986). Julia Page (ed.). Intelligence Officer in the Peninsular: Letters and Diaries of Major The Honourable Edward Charles Cocks 1786-1812. Tunbridge Wells: Spellmount. ISBN 978-0-946-77171-4. OCLC 499131556.
- Holmes, Richard (2001). Redcoat: The British Soldier in the Age of Horse and Musket. London: HarperCollins. ISBN 978-0-002-57097-8. OCLC 47355221.
- Muir, Rory (2013). Wellington: The Path to Victory 1769–1814. Vol. 1. New Haven, US and London: Yale University Press. ISBN 978-0-300-20548-0. OCLC 859834304.

Parliament of the United Kingdom
Preceded by Joseph Sydney Yorke; Philip James Cocks	Member of Parliament for Reigate; 1806–1812; With: Viscount Royston 1806–1808; James Cocks 1808–1812	Succeeded by James Cocks; Hon. John Cocks
