= Charles Somers-Cocks, 3rd Earl Somers =

British politician (1819–1883)

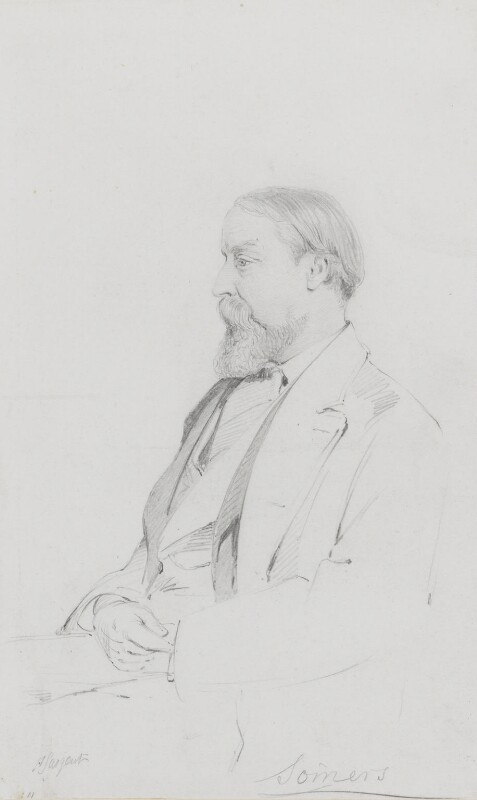
Charles Somers-Cocks (portrait by Frederick Sargent, National Portrait Gallery)

Charles Somers Somers-Cocks, 3rd Earl Somers (14 July 1819 – 26 September 1883), styled the Hon. Charles Cocks from 1819 to 1841 and Viscount Eastnor from 1841 to 1852, was a British Conservative Party and then Liberal politician.

Somers was the son of John Somers-Cocks, 2nd Earl Somers, and his wife Lady Caroline Harriet, daughter of Philip Yorke, 3rd Earl of Hardwicke. As a Conservative, he was elected to the House of Commons as the Member of Parliament (MP) for Reigate at a by-election in February 1841 (succeeding his father), a seat he held until 1847. In 1852 he succeeded his father in the earldom and took his seat in the House of Lords. He served as a Lord-in-waiting (government whip in the House of Lords) from 1853 to 1855 in Lord Aberdeen's coalition government and from 1855 to 1857 in the Liberal administration of Lord Palmerston.

Lord Somers married Virginia, daughter of James Pattle, in 1850; she was the sister of Julia Margaret Cameron (née Pattle), a well-known Victorian-era photographer. Lord Somers and Virginia had three daughters, of whom one, Lady Virginia, died from diphtheria at an early age. The younger daughter, Lady Adeline Marie, married George Russell, 10th Duke of Bedford, while the elder daughter, Lady Isabella Caroline, married Lord Henry Somerset.

Lord Somers died in September 1883, aged 64, when the earldom and viscountcy of Eastnor became extinct. He was succeeded in his junior title of Baron Somers by his first cousin once removed, Philip Reginald Cocks. The Countess Somers died in 1910.

== Notes ==
Parliament of the United Kingdom
Preceded by Viscount Eastnor	Member of Parliament for Reigate; 1841–1847	Succeeded by Thomas Somers-Cocks
Political offices
Preceded by The Earl Talbot	Lord-in-waiting; 1853–1857	Succeeded by The Lord Cremorne
Peerage of the United Kingdom
Preceded by John Somers-Cocks	Earl Somers; 1852–1883	Extinct
Peerage of Great Britain
Preceded by John Somers-Cocks	Baron Somers; 1852–1883	Succeeded by Philip Reginald Cocks
