= Thomas Powell Symonds =

British politician

Thomas Powell Symonds (1762 – 19 August 1819) was Member of Parliament (MP) for Hereford 1800 to 1819, and lieutenant colonel of the South Gloucester Militia.

Thomas Powell Symonds was the eldest son of Thomas Symonds Powell Symonds of Pengethley Manor (near Ross) and his wife Sarah Mary Rootes, daughter of Joseph Chester of Gloucester. He was the eldest of eight children and inherited Pengethley Manor from his father in 1793. He was appointed High Sheriff of Herefordshire for 1798–99.

Symonds married a Mary Rootes and fathered 7 sons. He was succeeded by his nephew, also Thomas Powell Symonds (son of Rev Joseph Symonds—T.S.P. Symonds' second son).

== Coat of arms ==
Coat of arms: Sa, a dolphin embowed holding in the mouth a fish arg. Crest: A dolphin as in the arms.

Parliament of Great Britain
Preceded by James Walwyn; John Scudamore	Member of Parliament for Hereford; Nov 1800 – Dec 1800; With: John Scudamore	Succeeded by Parliament of Great Britain
Parliament of the United Kingdom
Preceded by Parliament of Great Britain	Member of Parliament for Hereford; 1801 – 1819; With: John Scudamore to 1805; Richard Philip Scudamore 1805–1818; Viscount Eastnor from 1818	Succeeded by Richard Philip Scudamore; Viscount Eastnor
