= John Somers-Cocks, 2nd Earl Somers =

British peer and Conservative politician

John Somers Somers-Cocks, 2nd Earl Somers (19 March 1788 – 5 October 1852), styled Viscount Eastnor between 1821 and 1841, was a British peer and Conservative Party politician.

Somers was the second son of John Cocks, 1st Earl Somers; his older brother Edward Charles Cocks died in the Peninsular War. He was educated at Westminster, entered the British Army and served in the Peninsula War. Somers sat as Member of Parliament for Reigate between 1812 and 1818 (succeeding his elder brother) and again between 1832 and 1841 and for Hereford between 1818 and 1832. In 1841 he succeeded his father in the earldom. He was colonel of the disembodied Herefordshire Militia from 16 January 1836 until his death.

Parliament of the United Kingdom
Preceded by Edward Cocks; James Cocks	Member of Parliament for Reigate; 1812–1818; With: James Cocks	Succeeded by Sir Joseph Sydney Yorke; James Somers Cocks
Preceded by Thomas Powell Symonds; Richard Philip Scudamore	Member of Parliament for Hereford; 1818–1832; With: Thomas Powell Symonds 1818–19; Richard Philip Scudamore 1819–26; Edward Clive 1826–32	Succeeded by Edward Clive; Robert Biddulph
Preceded by Joseph Yorke; Charles Yorke (representation reduced to one member 1832)	Member of Parliament for Reigate; 1832–1841	Succeeded by Viscount Eastnor
Honorary titles
Preceded by The Lord Bateman	Lord Lieutenant of Herefordshire; 1845–1852	Succeeded by The Lord Bateman
Peerage of the United Kingdom
Preceded by John Somers Cocks	Earl Somers; 1841–1852	Succeeded by Charles Somers Somers-Cocks
