= Copley baronets of Sprotbrough (1st creation, 1661) =

Escutcheon of the Copley baronets of Sprotbrough

The Copley baronetcy of Sprotbrough in Yorkshire, was created for Godfrey Copley on 17 June 1661.

His son the 2nd Baronet was High Sheriff of Yorkshire for 1677–8 and 1678–9. He was a Fellow of the Royal Society, and a Member of Parliament for Aldborough 1679–1685 and Thirsk 1695–1709. He left no male heir, and the baronetcy became extinct. His bequest to the Royal Society financed the Copley Medal.

== Copley baronets, of Sprotbrough (1st creation, 1661) ==
- Sir Godfrey Copley, 1st Baronet (1623–1677)
- Sir Godfrey Copley, 2nd Baronet (c. 1653–1709)
