= John Cocks, 1st Earl Somers =

British politician

The Right Honourable Earl Somers
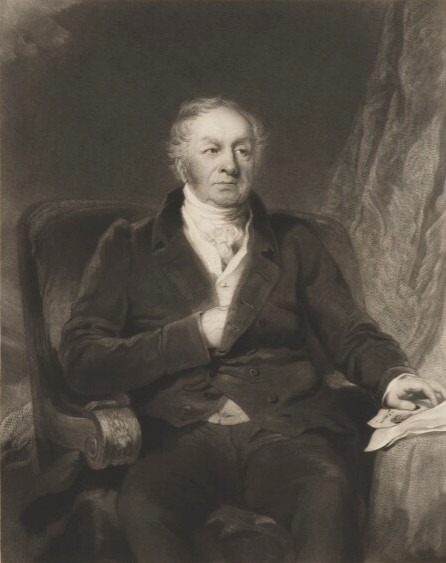

Lord Lieutenant of Herefordshire
- In office 1817–1841
- Monarchs: George III; George IV; William IV; Victoria
- Preceded by: The Earl of Essex
- Succeeded by: The Lord Bateman

Personal details
- Born: 6 May 1760
- Died: 5 January 1841 (aged 80)
- Spouse: (1) Margaret Nash (d. 1831) (2) Jane Cocks (d. 1868)
- Children: 4, including Edward and John
- Education: St Alban's Hall, Oxford

John Somers Cocks, 1st Earl Somers (/ˈsʌmərz/ SUM-ərz; 6 May 1760 – 5 January 1841), styled as the Lord Somers between 1806 and 1821, was a British politician.

== Background and education ==
Somers was the son of Charles Cocks, 1st Baron Somers, and Elizabeth, daughter of Richard Eliot. He was educated at Westminster and St Alban Hall, Oxford.

== Political career ==
Somers sat as Member of Parliament for West Looe between 1782 and 1784, for Grampound between 1784 and 1790 and finally for Reigate between 1790 and 1806. The latter year he succeeded his father in the barony and entered the House of Lords. In 1817 he was appointed Lord Lieutenant of Herefordshire, a post he held until his death in 1841. In 1821 he was created Earl Somers and accorded additional style Viscount Eastnor, of Eastnor Castle in the County of Hereford, to be the courtesy style of the eldest son of the Earl.

Starting in the 1790s he had served with the Worcester Yeomen Cavalry.

== Family ==
Lord Somers was twice married. He married as his first wife Margaret, daughter of Reverend Treadway Russell Nash, on 19 March 1785. They had three sons and one daughter. His eldest son, Edward Charles Cocks, a British Army officer, was killed at the Siege of Burgos in 1812 during the Peninsular War, greatly to the regret of the Duke of Wellington, who valued him highly.

After his first wife's death in February 1831, he married as his second wife his first cousin, Jane, daughter of James Cocks and widow of Reverend George Waddington, in 1834. They had no children. Somers died in January 1841, aged 80, and was succeeded in his titles by his second but eldest surviving son, John. The Countess Somers died in November 1868.

== Notes ==
Parliament of Great Britain
Preceded by Sir William James, Bt; John Buller	Member of Parliament for West Looe; 1782–1784; With: Sir William James, Bt 1782–1784; John Buller 1784	Succeeded by John Lemon; John Scott
Preceded by Sir John Ramsden, Bt; Thomas Lucas	Member of Parliament for Grampound; 1784–1790; With: Francis Baring	Succeeded by Thomas Wallace; Jeremiah Crutchley
Preceded by Reginald Pole-Carew; The Lord Hood	Member of Parliament for Reigate; 1790–1801; With: Joseph Sydney Yorke	Succeeded by Parliament of the United Kingdom
Parliament of the United Kingdom
Preceded by Parliament of Great Britain	Member of Parliament for Reigate; 1801–1806; With: Joseph Sydney Yorke	Succeeded by Joseph Sydney Yorke; Philip James Cocks
Honorary titles
Preceded by The Earl of Essex	Lord Lieutenant of Herefordshire; 1817–1841	Succeeded by The Lord Bateman
Peerage of Great Britain
Preceded by Charles Cocks	Baron Somers; 1806–1841	Succeeded by John Somers-Cocks
Peerage of the United Kingdom
New creation	Earl Somers; 1821–1841	Succeeded by John Somers-Cocks
