= 1916 Birthday Honours =

National awards given by King George V

The 1916 Birthday Honours were appointments by King George V to various orders and honours to reward and highlight good works by citizens of the British Empire. The appointments were made to celebrate the official birthday of The King, and were published in The London Gazette and in The Times on 3 June 1916.

Owing to the ongoing War, the 50-page supplement to The Gazette included 3,880 names of recipients of honours, military promotion of rank and medals, including the Military Cross (708 people, among them the Prince of Wales), Distinguished Service Order (373) and 1,217 Military Medals.

In addition, more than 500 nurses from across the British Empire received the Royal Red Cross, a huge number noted by The British Journal of Nursing in its issue on 10 June: "The inclusion of so many members of the nursing profession (516) in the Birthday Honours' list is a unique event, and we most cordially congratulate those Matrons, Sisters and Nurses who have earned this distinction, while we bear in mind many others whose splendid work merits recognition."

The recipients of honours are displayed here as they were styled before their new honour, and arranged by honour, with classes (Knight, Knight Grand Cross, etc.) and then divisions (Military, Civil, etc.) as appropriate.

== United Kingdom and British Empire ==
=== Baron ===
- The Rt. Hon. Sir Savile Brinton Crossley Bt KCVO by the name, style and title of Baron Somerleyton of Somerleyton in the county of Suffolk.
- The Rt. Hon. Sir Arthur Nicolson Bt GCB GCMG GCVO KCIE by the name, style and title of Baron Carnock of Carnock in the county of Stirling.
- Tonman Mosley CB by the name, style and title of Baron Anslow of Iver in the county of Buckingham.
- George Coats, by the name, style and title of Baron Glentanar of Glen Tanar in the county of Aberdeen.
- Charles Edward Hungerford Atholl Colston, by the name, style and title of Baron Roundway of Devizes in the county of Wiltshire.

=== Privy Councillor ===
The King appointed the following to His Majesty's Most Honourable Privy Council:

- Christopher Addison MP
- Charles William Bowerman MP
- Sir Gilbert Parker Bt MP
- Sir Harry Samuel MP
- The Hon. Sir George Eulas Foster KCMG

=== Baronetcies ===
- Sir William Maxwell Aitken MP
- Sir Robert Hudson Borwick
- Arthur Philip du Cros
- Thomas Lane Devitt
- Thomas Dunlop
- Bertram Godfray Falle
- Major the Hon. Eustace Edward Twisleton-Wykeham-Fiennes
- Sir Edward Holt
- Sir Algernon Marshall Stedman Methuen
- Ernest William Moir
- Cyril Arthur Pearson
- William James Tatem

=== Knight Bachelor ===
- James Tynte Agg-Gardner MP
- John Anthony of Dalmeny, Dumbreck, Glasgow
- George Thomas Beilby FRS
- Arthur William Binning
- Thomas Collins, Chief Inspector, Board of Inland Revenue.
- Theodore Andrea Cook, Editor of The Field
- John Henry Corke, Mayor of Portsmouth
- George Doolette, President of the Australian Voluntary Hospital at Wimereux.
- Arthur Isaac Durrant MVO Comptroller of the Supplies Division, Office of Works
- Francis Mark Farmer
- William Gallagher ISO Chief Inspector, Board of Customs
- Eric C. Geddes, Deputy Director-General of Munitions Supply.
- William B. Gentle, Chief Constable of Brighton
- George Greenwood MP
- William Peter Griggs
- Maurice Hill KC
- David Hope Kyd
- Robert Morris Liddell JP High Sheriff of County Down.
- Alfred Henry Herbert Matthews, Secretary of the Central Chamber of Agriculture
- Commander Edward Nicholl RNR
- John James Oddy MP
- Robert Pearce MP
- Alexander William Prince, managing director of the Navy and Army Canteen Board
- George Heynes Radford MP
- Archibald Tutton Salvidge
- Henry Smith, Deputy Lieutenant for the City of London.
- Jethro Justinian Harris Teall FRS
- Professor Nestor Isidore Charles Tirard FRCP
- Glynn Hamilton West, deputy director, General of Munitions Supply
- Frederick Whitley Whitley-Thomson MP

Colonies, Protectorates, etc.

- The Hon. Marshall Campbell, Senator of the Union of South Africa
- The Hon. Wallace Graham, Chief Justice of the Supreme Court of Nova Scotia
- The Hon. Pierre-Amand Landry, Chief Justice of the King's Bench Division of the Supreme Court of New Brunswick
- The Hon. Frederic William Lang, Speaker of the House of Representatives of the Dominion of New Zealand
- The Hon. Robert Furse McMillan, Chief Justice of Western Australia
- The Hon. Herbert Nicholls, Chief Justice of the Supreme Court of Tasmania
- Gilbert Kenelm Treffry Purcell, Chief Justice of the Colony of Sierra Leone
- Robert Frederic Stupart, Director of the Meteorological Service of Canada
- The Hon. Antonie Gysbert Viljoen, Senator of the Union of South Africa

British India

- Herbert Stanley Reed Editor of The Times of India
- Ratanji Jamshedji Tata JP
- Francis Hugh Stewart CIE
- Charles William Chitty, a Puisne Judge of the High Court of Judicature at Fort William in Bengal
- Robert Swan Highet, General Manager of the East India Railway

=== The Most Honourable Order of the Bath ===
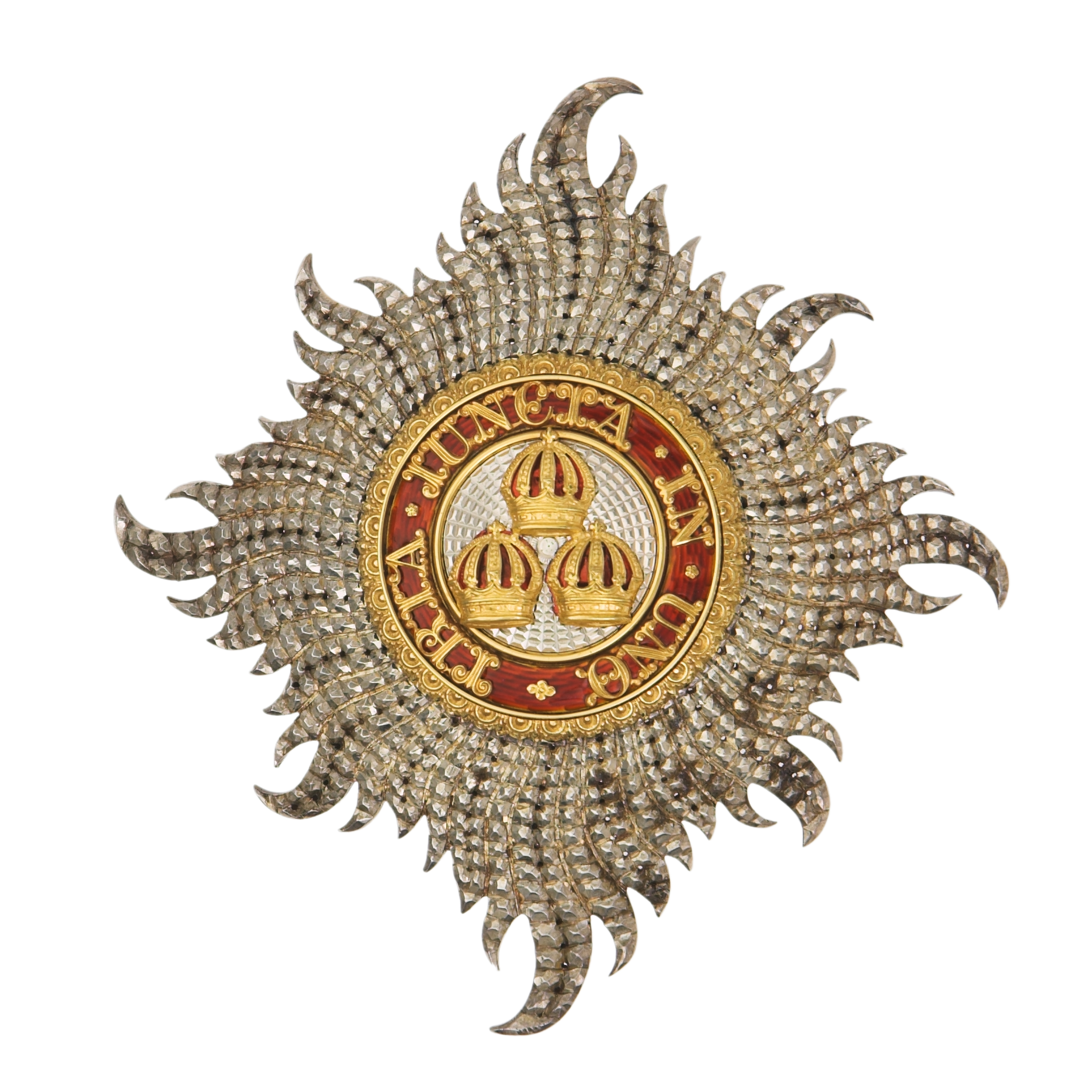
Civilian star of the Knight Grand Cross of the Order of the Bath

==== Knight Grand Cross of the Order of the Bath (GCB) ====
Military Division
Royal Navy

- Admiral Sir George Astley Callaghan GCVO KCB

Army

- General Sir William Henry Mackinnon KCB KCVO, Colonel, King's Regiment (Liverpool)

Civil Division

- The Rt. Hon. Sir John Hay Athole Macdonald KCB
- Lt.-Col. The Rt. Hon. Sir Arthur Bigge, Baron Stamfordham GCIE GCVO KCB KCSI KCMG ISO
- The Rt. Hon. Sir Francis John Stephens Hopwood GCMG KCB

==== Knight Commander of the Order of the Bath (KCB) ====
Military Division
Army

- Major-General Launcelot Edward Kiggell CB
- Major-General George Henry Fowke CB
- Major-General John Philip Du Cane CB
- Major-General Charles Ernest Heath CVO CB

Civil Division

- Bernard Mallet CB, Registrar-General.
- Robert Henry Rew CB, Assistant Secretary, Board of Agriculture.
- William Gibbs Turpin CB, Controller-General, National Debt Office.

==== Companion of the Order of the Bath (CB) ====
Military Division
Royal Navy

- Capt. Edwyn Sinclair Alexander-Sinclair MVO ADC (Commodore, 2nd Class)
- Rear-Admiral Sir Robert Keith Arbuthnot Bt MVO
- Rear-Admiral Montague Edward Browning MVO
- Capt. George Cuthbert Cayley
- Capt. Alfred Ernle Montacute Chatfield CVO
- Capt. Alfred Astley Ellison
- Rear-Admiral Hugh Evan-Thomas MVO
- Fleet Paymaster Walter Gask
- Engineer Capt. Donald Percy Green
- Capt. William Edmund Goodenough MVO ADC (Commodore, 2nd Class)
- Capt. Lionel Halsey CMG ADC (Commodore, 1st Class)
- Rear-Admiral Herbert Leopold Heath MVO
- Engineer Capt. Fred Hore
- Fleet Surgeon Ernest Courtney Lomas DSO MB FRCSE
- Rear-Admiral Trevylyan Dacres Willes Napier MVO
- Lt.-Col. Cecil Alvend FitzHerbert Osmaston, Royal Marine Artillery
- Fleet Paymaster Montague Stephens
- Vice-Admiral Reginald Godfrey Otway Tupper CVO
- Capt. Drury St. Aubyn Wake (Commodore, 2nd Class)

Army

- Lt.-Col. and Brevet Col. Frederick Gore Anley, Essex Regiment
- Lt.-Col. and Brevet Col. Colin Robert Ballard, Norfolk Regiment
- Col. Reginald Walter Ralph Barnes DSO
- Surg.-General Walter George Augustus Bedford CMG MB
- Col. Thomas Arthur Hastings Bigge
- Lt.-Col. and Brevet Col. James Frederick Noel Birch ADC Royal Artillery
- Lt.-Col. and Brevet Col. Wilkinson Dent Bird DSO ADC
- Col. Edward Humphry Bland
- Col. David Graham Mushcet Campbell
- Lt.-Col. and Brevet Col. George Glas Sandeman Carey, Royal Artillery
- Lt.-Col. Beresford Cecil Molyneux Carter CMG, The King's (Liverpool Regiment)
- Col. Charles Marling Cartwright
- Lt.-Col. and Brevet Col. Skipton Hill Climo DSO, Indian Army
- Lt.-Col. George Kynaston Cockerill
- Col. Francis William Henry Cox, Indian Army, Assistant Quartermaster-General, Burma Division
- Lt.-Col. Charles Chevin Cumming MB, Royal Army Medical Corps
- Col. Henry Rodolph Davies
- Lt.-Col. and Brevet Col. Frank Seymour Derham
- Col. Lionel Dorling DSO
- Col. Lionel Charles Dunsterville ADC, Indian Army, Brigade Commander, Peshawar (Infantry) Brigade
- Lt.-Col. Frederick Kendall Fair, Royal Engineers
- Lt.-Col. and Brevet Col. Geoffrey Percy Thynne Feilding DSO, Coldstream Guards
- Col. Herbert Cokayne Frith
- Col. Henry Edward Fane Goold-Adams CMG
- Lt.-Col. John Lewis Randolph Gordon, 15th Sikhs, Indian Army
- Col. Henry West Hodgson CVO
- Col. John Hotham
- Lt.-Col. and Brevet Col. Charles Patrick Amyatt Hull, late The Duke of Cambridge's Own, Middlesex Regiment
- Temp. Col. George Gillett Hunter CMG, Egyptian Government Service
- Col. Oliver Richard Archer Julian CMG
- Col. Hugh Kennedy, Indian Army
- Col. Edward Ranulph Kenyon
- Lt.-Col. and Brevet Col. Geoffrey Chicheley Kemp, Royal Engineers
- Col. Algernon D'Aguila King DSO
- Col. Richard Harman Luce MB FRCS
- Lt.-Col. and Brevet Col. Arthur George Marrable, The King's Own (Yorkshire Light Infantry)
- Col. Frank Broadwood Matthews DSO
- Lt.-Col. and Brevet Col. Frederick Lansdowne Morrison, Highland Light Infantry
- Col. Edward Alfred Moulton-Barrett CMG
- Col. Lewis Loyd Nicol
- Surg.-General Thomas Joseph O'Donnell DSO
- Lt.-Col. Ralph Glyn Ouseley CMG DSO Royal Artillery
- Col. St. John William Topp Parker
- Lt.-Col. Ernest Moncrieff Paul, Royal Engineers
- Col. Hugh Whitchurch Perry
- Col. Arthur Phelps
- Surg.-General Robert Porter MB
- Col. Ernest St. George Pratt DSO
- Lt.-Col. Richard Thomas Incledon Ridgway, 33rd Punjabis, Indian Army
- Lt.-Col. Godfrey Walker Robinson, 27th Punjabis, Indian Army
- Col. Acton Lemuel Schreiber DSO ADC
- Lt.-Col. Charles Hamilton Seville, S. and T. Corps, Indian Army
- Col. Cameron Deane Shute
- Col. Arnold Frederick Sillem
- Col. Sydenham Campbell Urquhart Smith
- Col. Edward Taylor
- Lt.-Col. Henry Fleetwood Thuillier CMG, Royal Engineers
- Col. Julian Dallas Tyndale Tyndale-Biscoe
- Lt.-Col. Henry Osman Vincent, Royal Artillery

Australian Imperial Force

- Lt.-Col. and Hon. Col. John Paton, 25th Battalion
- Lt.-Col. William Walter Russell Watson, 24th Battalion
- Lt.-Col. John Lamrock, 20th Battalion

South African Defence Forces

- Brigadier-General Henry Timson Lukin CMG DSO

Civil Division

- William Henry Beveridge, Assistant Secretary, Board of Trade
- Col. Alfred Percy Blenkinsop, Assistant Director-General, Army Medical Service
- Col. William Frederick Cleeve, Retired, late Royal Artillery
- Col. Charles Frederick Close, late Royal Engineers, Director-General, Ordnance Survey
- Lt.-Col. and Honorary Col. Cecil Hodgson Colvin DSO, Special Reserve (Capt., retired), The Essex Regiment
- Acting Capt. Thomas Evans Crease RN (retired)
- Surgeon-General John Jeffreys Dennis MD RN
- Col. William Elliot, Retired, late Royal Artillery
- Engineer Rear-Admiral Ernest Frank Ellis
- Norman Fenwick Warren Fisher, deputy chairman, Board of Inland Revenue
- William Henry Gard MVO. (Royal Corps of Naval Constructors)
- Lt.-Col. Vivian Henry, Special Reserve (Major, Reserve of Officers), Commanding 5th Battalion (Reserve), The Royal Fusiliers (City of London Regiment)
- Major-General Hugh Palliser Hickman, late Royal Artillery
- Lt.-Col. Norman Mackenzie Hemming, Royal Engineers, Superintendent of Building Works, Royal Arsenal
- Thomas Beaumont Hohler, H.M. Chargé d'Affaires in Mexico
- Major Percy Samuel Lelean, Royal Army Medical Corps, Assistant Professor, Royal Army Medical College
- George Evelyn Pemberton Murray, Secretary to the Post Office
- Col. Charles Edwin Nuthall, Deputy Director-General, Army Veterinary Service
- Edmund Bampfylde Phipps, Principal Assistant Secretary, Board of Education
- Capt. John Franklin Parry RN
- Capt. Hugh Francis Paget Sinclair RN
- Capt. Matthew Henry Phineas Riall Sankey, late Royal Engineers
- The Hon. Arthur Stanley MVO MP
- Sir Hugh Shaw Stewart Bt
- Lt.-Col. Sir Richard Carnac Temple Bt CIE
- David James Shackleton, Member of the National Health Insurance Commission (England)
- Lt.-Col. John Frederick Stenning, Officers Training Corps (Oxford University)
- Aubrey Vere Symonds, Assistant Secretary, Local Government Board
- Col. Sir Courtauld Thomson
- Basil Home Thomson, Assistant Commissioner of Police
- Thomas Mitchell Williams
- Ulick Fitzgerald Wintour CMG, Director of Contracts, War Office

=== Order of Merit (OM) ===
- The Rt. Hon. Arthur James Balfour MP FRS

=== The Most Exalted Order of the Star of India ===
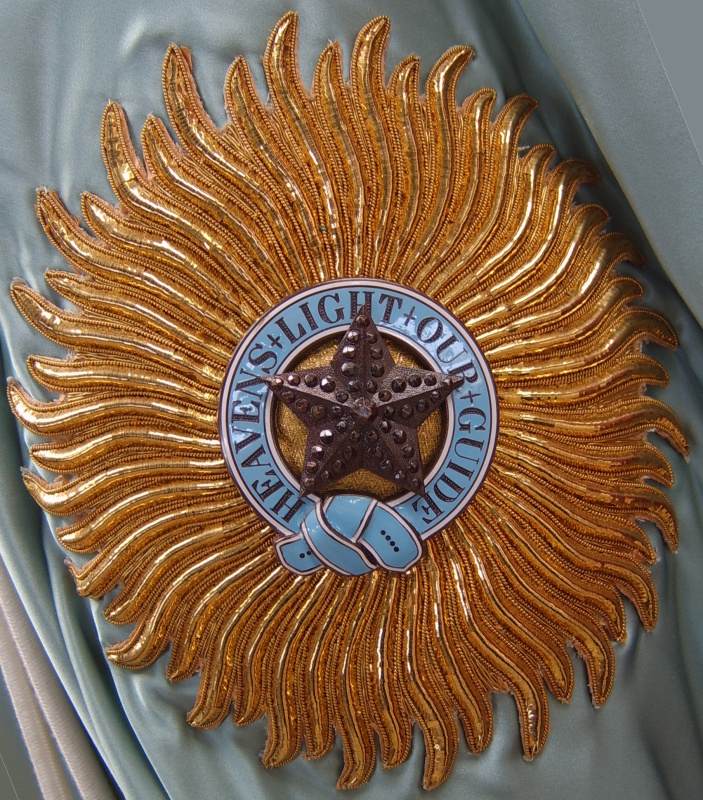
Star of a Knight Grand Commander of the Most Exalted Order of the Star of India.

==== Knight Commander (KCSI) ====
- Alexander Gordon Cardew CSI, Indian Civil Service, an Ordinary Member of the Council of the Governor of Fort St. George, Madras.
- Lt.-Col. Sir Hugh Daly KCIE CSI, Indian Army, lately Resident in Mysore and Chief Commissioner, Coorg.

==== Companion (CSI) ====
- Lt.-Col. Stephen Lushington Aplin, Indian Army, Commissioner of the Mandalay Division, Burma.
- Sir James Houssemayne Du Boulay KCIE, Indian Civil Service, lately Private Secretary to the Viceroy and Governor-General of India.
- John Ghest Cumming CIE, Indian Civil Service, Chief Secretary to the Government of Bengal, on special duty, and an Additional Member of the Council of the Governor-General for making Laws and Regulations.
- Laurence Robertson, Indian Civil Service, Secretary to the Government of Bombay, Political and Judicial Departments.
- John Barry Wood CIE, Indian Civil Service, Secretary to the Government of India in the Foreign and Political Department, and an Additional Member of the Council of the Governor-General for making Laws and Regulations.

Honorary Companion

- His Excellency Sheikh Jaber bin Mubarak bin Sabah, Sheikh of Kuwait and Dependencies.

=== The Most Distinguished Order of Saint Michael and Saint George ===
Star of the Order of Saint Michael and Saint George.

==== Knight Grand Cross of the Order of St Michael and St George (GCMG) ====
- His Excellency the Rt. Hon. Sir Cecil Arthur Spring Rice GCVO KCMG, His Majesty's Ambassador Extraordinary and Plenipotentiary to the United States of America.
- Sir Arthur Henderson Young KCMG, Governor and Commander-in-Chief of the Straits Settlements.

==== Knight Commander of the Order of St Michael and St George (KCMG) ====
- Edward John Cameron CMG, Governor and Commander-in-Chief of the Colony of the Gambia.
- His Honour Pierre-Évariste Leblanc KC, Lieutenant-Governor of the province of Quebec.
- The Hon. James Alexander Lougheed KC, Minister without Portfolio and Leader of the Government in the Senate, Dominion of Canada.
- Brigadier-General Alfred William Robin CB CMG, Commandant of the New Zealand Military Forces.
- Walter Baldwin Spencer CMG, Professor of Biology, University of Melbourne, and Director of the National Museum of Natural History, Geology and Ethnology, Melbourne.
- John Henry Birchenough CMG, In recognition of services in connection with Rhodesia.
- Mansfeldt de Cardonnel Findlay CB CMG, His Majesty's Envoy Extraordinary and Minister Plenipotentiary to His Majesty the King of Norway.
- Charles Murray Marling CB CMG, His Majesty's Envoy Extraordinary and Minister Plenipotentiary at Tehran.
- Col. William Daniel Campbell Williams CB, Hon. Surgeon-General Australian Army Medical Corps.

Honorary Knights Commander

- His Highness Tunku Mohamed, Yang di Pertuan Besar of the Negri Sembilan CMG

==== Companion of the Order of St Michael and St George (CMG) ====
- Peter Board MA, Under Secretary to the Department of Public Instruction and Director of Education, State of New South Wales
- Henry Roland Murray Bourne, Secretary for Defence, Union of South Africa
- Charles Bell Child Clipperton, His Majesty's Consul-General at Rouen
- Archibald Samuel Cooper, General Manager of the Nigerian Railway
- Lt.-Col. Thomas Astley Cubitt RA DSO, lately Officer Commanding Troops and Deputy Commissioner, Somaliland Protectorate
- Cecil Clementi MA, Government Secretary of the Colony of British Guiana
- Laurence Fortescue ISO, Comptroller of the Royal North-West Mounted Police, Dominion of Canada
- Bertram Giles, His Majesty's Consul at Nanking
- Alexander Granville, Director-General of the Municipality in Cairo
- Barry May, Treasurer and Deputy Resident Commissioner of Basutoland
- Allan Maclean, His Majesty's Consul-General at Valparaiso
- Col. Henry Huntly Leith Malcolm CB DSO, lately Officer Commanding the Troops, Ceylon
- Henry William le Messurier, Assistant Collector and Deputy Minister of Customs, Newfoundland
- Alfred Henry Miles ISO, Collector-General, Revenue Department, Island of Jamaica
- Frederick Montizambert ISO, Director-General of Public Health, Dominion of Canada
- Edward Augustus Petherick, Archivist in the Library of the Parliament of the Commonwealth of Australia
- Alexander Ransford Slater, Colonial Secretary of the Gold Coast
- Ronald Storrs, Oriental Secretary at His Majesty's Residency, Cairo

Additional Companions for services rendered in connection with Military Operations in the Field:

- Major Leonard Henry Abbott, 11th Rajputs, Indian Army
- Temp. Lt.-Col. Charles Murray Abercrombie, Lancashire Fusiliers
- Lt.-Col. Hugh Morris Allen DSO, Royal Highlanders
- Major and Brevet Lt.-Col. Nelson Graham Anderson DSO, Army Service Corps
- Lt.-Col. (temp. Col.) John Cecil Armstrong, Army Pay Dept
- Lt.-Col. Ben Atkinson, Royal Artillery
- Col. Charles Edward Baddeley
- Lt.-Col. Walter Edward Banbury, Indian Army, Nottinghamshire and Derbyshire Regiment
- Col. Albert Louis Frederick Bate, Army Medical Service
- Col. Thomas Boswall Beach, Army Medical Service
- Lt.-Col. Maurice Hugh Lowthian Bell, Yorkshire Regiment
- Lt.-Col. Henry Lawrence Norman Beynon, Royal Artillery
- Major William James Bowker DSO, Somerset Light Infantry
- Major and Brevet Lt.-Col. Lionel Boyd Boyd-Moss, South Staffordshire Regiment
- Lt.-Col. Frederick Gardner Bradley, North Staffordshire Regiment
- Lt.-Col. Hubert Alaric Bray, Royal Army Medical Corps
- Lt.-Col. Edward Part Brooker, Royal Engineers
- Lt.-Col. William Basil Browell, Royal Artillery
- Lt.-Col. Ernest Sumner Burder, late Duke of Cornwall's Light Infantry
- Lt.-Col. and Brevet Col. Harry Nichol Byass, York and Lancaster Regiment
- Major and Brevet Lt.-Col. Neville John Gordon Cameron, Cameron Highlanders
- Lt.-Col. Albert Canning, Leinster Regiment, Special Reserve
- Major John William Vincent Carroll, Norfolk Regiment
- Lt.-Col. and Brevet Col. Alfred Henry Carter, Royal Artillery
- Lt.-Col. Lawrence Joseph Chapman, Royal Artillery
- Major Lionel Evelyn Oswald Charlton DSO, Lancashire Fusiliers and Royal Flying Corps
- Lt.-Col. and Hon. Col. Sir James Richardson Andrew Clark Bt CB FRCS, Royal Army Medical Corps (Unattached List)
- Lt.-Col. John Lewis Justice Clarke, East Yorkshire Regiment
- Lt.-Col. Lewis Henry Close, Royal Engineers
- Lt.-Col. John Henry Collett, Gloucestershire Regiment
- Major-General George Arthur Cookson CB, Indian Army
- Capt. and Hon. Major (temp. Major) Arthur Annerley Corder, late Major, attached Advanced Ordnance Depot
- Lt.-Col. Montagu Cradock CB, 2nd King Edward's Horse
- Lt.-Col. George Standish Gage Craufurd CIE DSO, Gordon Highlanders
- Lt.-Col. Charles Douglas Parry Crooke, Suffolk Regiment
- Lt.-Col. Edward George Curtis, Northamptonshire Regiment
- Major Thomas Wilkinson Cuthbert DSO, Seaforth Highlanders Res
- Major-General John Frederic Daniell, Royal Marine Light Infantry
- Major Henry Clayton Darlington, Manchester Regiment
- Lt.-Col. (temp. Col.) George Freshfield Davies, Army Service Corps
- Major Charles Parker Deedes DSO, Yorkshire Light Infantry
- Col. George Cecil Dowell
- Capt. Sidney Robert Drury-Lowe RN
- Lt.-Col. John Duncan DSO, Royal Scots Fusiliers
- Col. John Charles Basil Eastwood, Reserve of Officers
- Lt.-Col. Lionel William Pellew East DSO, Royal Artillery
- Col. James Edward Edmonds CB
- Lt.-Col. Roderick Mackenzie Edwards, retired, Indian Army, East Yorkshire Regiment
- Lt.-Col. Edward Henry Eley, Royal Field Artillery
- Major and Brevet Lt.-Col. Edward Leonard Ellington, Royal Artillery
- Lt.-Col. James George Fair DSO, Reserve of Officers
- Major Ronald D'Arcy Fife, Yorkshire Regiment
- Lt.-Col. Edward Heneage Finch-Hatton DSO, East Kent Regiment
- Lt.-Col. Charles Leonard Flick, Essex Regiment
- The Rev. William Forrest, Chaplain, 2nd Class, Army Chaplain Department
- Lt.-Col. John Vincent Forrest MB, Royal Army Medical Corps
- Major James Forrest, Lincolnshire Regiment
- Major James William Fraser, temp. Major, Seaforth Highlanders
- Lt.-Col. Lyons David Fraser, Royal Artillery
- Col. Ernest Carrick Freeman MD, Army Medical Service
- Temp. Col. Andrew Fullerton MD FRCSI, Army Medical Service
- Lt.-Col. Francis George Fuller, Royal Engineers
- Major James Robert Gaussen DSO, South Wales Borderers
- Lt.-Col. Lionel Guy Gisborne, Royal Field Artillery
- Major Godfrey Davenport Goodman, Nottinghamshire and Derbyshire Regiment 3 Territorial Force
- Col. Charles Gosling
- Col. Sylvester Bertram Grimston, 18th Lancers, Indian Army
- Major George Lytton Grossman DSO, West Yorkshire Regiment
- Col. Thomas Wyatt Hale, Advanced Ordnance Depot
- Major George Hall MD, Royal Army Medical Corps
- Col. Charles Edward Harrison CVO FRCS MB, Army Medical Service
- Col. Gilbert Harwood Harrison
- Lt.-Col. Henry John Haslegrave, Yorkshire Light Infantry
- Col. Coryndon William Rutherford Healey, Army Medical Service
- Lt.-Col. Francis William Heath, Royal Artillery
- Major Andrew Henderson, Durham Light Infantry
- Lt.-Col. James Dalgleish Heriot-Maitland DSO, Rifle Brigade
- Major Edward Vincent Osborne Hewett, South Wales Borderers
- Lt.-Col. Lyone John Hext, Royal Artillery
- Lt.-Col. Edward Andus Hirst, Royal Field Artillery
- Major Hardress Gilbert Holmes, Yorkshire Regiment
- Principal Chaplain the Rev. Arthur Venables Calvely Hordern, Army Chaplains' Department
- Major and Brevet Lt.-Col. Gwyn Venables Hordern, King's Royal Rifle Corps
- Major and Brevet Col. Arthur Reginald Hoskins DSO, North Staffordshire Regiment
- Lt.-Col. Arthur Benison Hubback, 20th Battalion, London Regiment
- Temp. Lt.-Col. James Frederick Humby DSO, Nottinghamshire and Derbyshire Regiment
- Lt.-Col. Lawrence Humphry, Royal Army Medical Corps
- Lt.-Col. Herbert Ellison Rhodes James CB FRCS, Royal Army Medical Corps
- Major and Brevet Lt.-Col. James Bruce Jardine DSO, 5th Lancers
- Major and Brevet Lt.-Col. Gladwyn Dundas Jebb DSO, Bedfordshire Regiment
- Major Algernon Cautley Jeffcoat DSO, Royal Fusiliers
- Major and Brevet Lt.-Col. George Darell Jeffreys, Grenadier Guards
- Lt.-Col. Michael Derwas Goring Jones, Durham Light Infantry
- Major and Brevet Lt.-Col. Leslie Cockburn Jones MVO, 7th Lancers, Indian Army
- Lt.-Col. Theophilus Percy Jones MB, Royal Army Medical Corps
- Major Henry Karslake DSO, Royal Artillery
- Lt.-Col. William Martin Kay, Scottish Rifles
- Lt.-Col. Kempster Kenmure Knapp, Royal Artillery
- Major George Edmund Reginald Kenrick DSO, Royal West Surrey Regiment
- Major Charles Arthur Ker DSO, Royal Artillery
- Lt.-Col. Edwin James King, Middlesex Regiment
- Commander Dennis Augustus Hugo Larking RN (retired)
- Col. George Francis Leverson CB
- Lt.-Col. Arthur Corrie Lewin DSO, Special Reserve
- Lt.-Col. Arthur Hugh Lister MB, Royal Army Medical Corps
- Major Thomas Owen Lloyd, Royal Highlanders
- Major and Brevet Lt.-Col. James Atkinson Longridge, 43rd Regiment, Indian Army
- Lt.-Col. Francis Lyon DSO, Royal Artillery
- Major Donald Florence MacCarthy-Morrogh, Royal Munster Fusiliers, Special Reserve
- Major Charles Lane Magniac, Royal Engineers
- Fleet-Paymaster Henry Wilfred Eldon Manisty RN
- Lt.-Col. Ernest Edmund Martin FRCVS, Army Veterinary Corps
- Lt.-Col. Frederick Guy Maunsell, Royal Artillery
- Lt.-Col. Alexander Anderson McHardy DSO, Royal Artillery
- Capt. Malcolm McNeill DSO, Argyll and Sutherland Highlanders
- Lt.-Col. Frank Hermann Moline, Army Pay Department
- Col. Sir Robert Drummond Moncreiffe Bt ADC Royal Highlanders
- Col. Herbert Montgomery-Campbell (late Royal Artillery)
- Temp. Lt.-Col. David Simpson Morton, Highland Light Infantry
- Lt.-Col. Edward Spencer Hoare Nairne, Royal Artillery
- Major Walter Gordon Neilson DSO, Argyll and Sutherland Highlanders
- Lt.-Col. Augustus Charles Newsom, Army Veterinary Corps
- Col. Cecil Lothian Nicholson, East Lancashire Regiment
- Temp. Lt.-Col. Reginald Lewis Norrington, Border Regiment
- Lt-Col. and Brevet Col. Lionel Grant Oliver, late Middlesex Regiment
- Lt.-Col. Frederick Cunliffe Owen, Royal Artillery
- Temp. Lt.-Col. Albert Ingraham Paine DSO, King's Royal Rifle Corps
- Lt.-Col. Henry Ingham Evered Palmer, Indian Army
- Major Alphonse Eugene Panet, Royal Engineers
- Surgeon Major Basil Pares DSO, Royal Horse Guards
- Major Walter Mansel Parker, Army Service Corps
- Lt.-Col. and Brevet Col. Oswald Pearce-Serocold, Royal Berkshire Regiment
- Capt. Maurice Loraine Pears, Northumberland Fusiliers
- Lt.-Col. Henry Cecil Petre, late Rifle Brigade
- Col. George Fraser Phillips
- Lt.-Col. Louis Murray Phillpotts DSO, Royal Artillery
- Lt.-Col. Grenville Edmund Pigott DSO, Army Service Corps
- Hon. Brigadier-General Joseph Howard Poett CB
- Major Aubrey Gordon Pritchard, 2nd Lancers, Indian Army, attached Royal Warwickshire Regiment
- Major and Brevet Lt.-Col. Charles Herbert Rankin DSO, 7th Hussars
- Major Robert Frederick Ratcliff, North Staffordshire Regiment
- Major Cecil Godfrey Rawling CIE, Somerset Light Infantry, commanding officer, Service Battalion
- Commander Alfred Rawlinson RNVR
- Major and Brevet Lt.-Col. Felix Fordati Ready DSO, Royal Berkshire Regiment
- Temp. Lt.-Col. William Henry Ritson, Northumberland Fusiliers
- Lt.-Col. Oliver Long Robinson, Royal Army Medical Corps
- Lt.-Col. John Guy Rotton, Royal Artillery
- Lt.-Col. and Brevet Col. Francis John Ryder
- Major Charles Philip Scudamore DSO, late Royal Scots Fusiliers
- Major Thomas Byrne Sellar, King's Own Scottish Borderers
- Col. Hugh Pentland Shekleton CB
- Major Charles William Singer DSO, Royal Engineers
- Lt.-Col. Edward Stockley Sinnott MICE, Royal Engineers
- Lt.-Col. (temp. Col.) Edward Wheeler Slayter MB, Royal Army Medical Corps
- Lt.-Col. Arthur Solly-Flood DSO, 4th Dragoon Guards
- Rev. Canon Henry Kemble Southwell MA, Chaplain 1st Class, Army Chaplains' Department
- Lt.-Col. George Redesdale Brooker Spain, Northumberland Fusiliers
- Lt.-Col. Richard Sparrow, 7th Dragoon Guards
- Major-General James Spens CB
- Major Hon. George Frederic Stanley, Royal Artillery
- Capt. Logan Sutherland Stansfeld RN |(retired)
- Lt.-Col. Charles John Steavenson, Liverpool Regiment
- Major Charles Merton Stephen, Advanced Ordnance Depot
- Lt.-Col. and Brevet Col. Reginald Byng Stephens, Rifle Brigade
- Col. Alfred Stokes CB DSO
- Lt.-Col. Adolphe Symons, 13th Hussars
- Col. John Arthur Tanner CB DSO
- Lt.-Col. Walter John Tatam, Army Veterinary Corps
- Col. Henry Neville Thompson DSO MB, Army Medical Service
- Lt.-Col. George Sinclair Thorn MB, Royal Army Medical Corps
- Col. Gervase Francis Newport Tinley CB, Indian Army
- Lt.-Col. John Tonge, Royal Field Artillery
- Lt.-Col. George Alexander Trent, Northamptonshire Regiment
- Lt.-Col. William Duncan Conybeare Trimnell, Army Ordnance Department
- Major and Brevet Lt.-Col. Gerald Frederic Trotter MVO DSO, Grenadier Guards
- Lt.-Col. Edward George Troyte-Bullock, Dorset Yeomanry
- Major William John Bell Tweedie, Argyll and Sutherland Highlanders
- Lt.-Col. James Arbuthnot Tyler, Royal Artillery
- Lt.-Col. and Brevet Col. Herbert Crofton Campbell Uniacke, Royal Artillery
- Lt.-Col. Ernest Vaux DSO, Durham Light Infantry
- Lt.-Col. George Vawdrey, Army Service Corps
- Major Evelyn Fountaine Villiers DSO, Royal Sussex Regiment
- Major Berkeley Vincent, 6th Dragoons
- Lt.-Col. Henry Bertram des Voeux, Royal Engineers
- Col. William Crawford Walton, Indian Army
- Lt.-Col. Harry Dudley Ossulston Ward, Royal Artillery
- Major and Hon. Lt.-Col. Thomas Ward, Denbigh Hussars Yeomanry
- Temp. Lt.-Col. William Watson, Staff
- Lt.-Col. Malcolm Hammond Edward Welch, Royal Irish Regiment
- Lt.-Col. Francis Owen Wethered, Royal Warwickshire Regiment
- Major Hon. Robert White, Royal Fusiliers
- Col. and Hon. Brigadier-General William Lewis White CB
- Lt.-Col. Edward Dalrymple White, Oxfordshire and Buckinghamshire Light Infantry
- Lt.-Col. Edward Nathan Whitley, Royal Field Artillery
- Major Walter Temple Willcox, 3rd Hussars
- Temp. Lt.-Col. William Henry Willcox MD FRCP, Royal Army Medical Corps
- Lt.-Col. Sydney Frederick Williams, Royal Engineers
- Col. James Barnett Wilson, Army Medical Service
- Major Arthur Herbert Windsor, 11th Battalion, London Regiment
- Col. Alfred Woodrow Stanley Wingate, Ret. Indian Army
- Lt.-Col. and Brevet Col. Thomas Birchall Wood, Royal Artillery

Australian Imperial Force

- Col. William Holmes DSO, Commonwealth Military Forces
- Brevet Lt.-Col. John Macquarie Antill CB, Staff
- Lt.-Col. Cecil Henry Foott, Staff
- Lt.-Col. John Patrick McGlinn, Staff
- Lt.-Col. Alfred Moon, Army Service Corps
- Lt.-Col. Bernard James Newmarch, Australian Medical Corps
- Lt.-Col. Lachlan Chisholm Wilson, 5th Light Horse Regiment
- Major Thomas William Glasgow DSO, 2nd Light Horse Regiment
- Major Stephen Midgley DSO, 5th Light Horse Regiment
- The Rev. Frederick William Wray, Chaplain 2nd Class

Canadian Contingent

- Col. Percival Edward Thacker
- Lt.-Col. William Okell Holden Dodds, Canadian Artillery
- Lt.-Col. John Fletcher Leopold Embury, 28th Battalion
- Lt.-Col. (temp. Col.) John Taylor Fotheringham, Army Medical Corps
- Lt.-Col. Henry Thoresby Hughes, Canadian Engineers
- Lt.-Col. William Bethune Lindsay, Canadian Engineers
- Lt.-Col. Archibald Hayes Macdonell DSO, Royal Canadian Regiment
- Lt.-Col. Henri-Alexandre Panet DSO, Royal Canadian Horse Artillery
- Lt.-Col. Colin Worthington Pope Ramsey, Canadian Engineers
- Lt.-Col. Herbert Cyril Thacker, Canadian Local Forces
- Hon. Lt.-Col. The Rev. John Macpherson Almond, Chaplain
- Hon. Major The Rev. William Beattie, Chaplain

New Zealand Imperial Force

- Lt.-Col. Walter William Alderman, Auckland Battalion
- Lt.-Col. Alexander Burnett Charters
- Lt.-Col. Percival Clennell Fenwick MB, Med. Corps
- Major The Rev. John Alfred Luxford, Chaplain 3rd Class, N.Z. Chaplain Department

South African Forces

- Lt.-Col. Frederick Stewart Dawson, 1st S.A. Infantry
- Lt.-Col. Frank Aubrey Jones DSO, 4th S.A. Infantry
- Lt.-Col. William Ernest Collins Tanner, 2nd S.A. Infantry
- Lt.-Col. Edward Francis Thackeray, 3rd S.A. Infantry

Honorary Companion

- Charles de Rocca-Serra, Legal Adviser to the President of the Council of Ministers in Cairo.

=== The Most Eminent Order of the Indian Empire ===
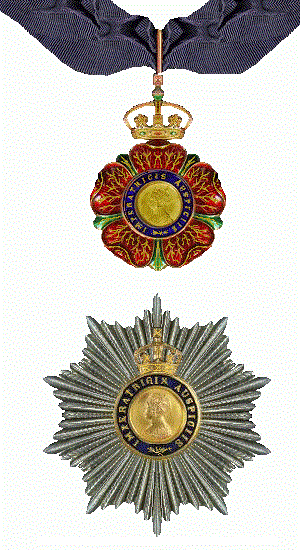
Riband, badge and star of the Knight Grand Commander of the Order of the Indian Empire

==== Knight Grand Commander (GCIE) ====
Honorary Knight Grand Commander

- His Excellency Sardar Arfa, Amir Nuyan Sheikh Khazal Khan ibn Haji Jabir Khan KCSI KCIE, Sheikh of Mohammerah.

==== Knight Commander (KCIE) ====
- Nawab Syed Shams-ul-Huda MA, an Ordinary Member of the Council of the Governor of Bengal.
- Raja Rampal Singh CIE, Taluqdar of Kurri Sidhauli, Rae Bareli District, United Provinces, and a Member of the Council of the Lieutenant-Governor for making Laws and Regulations.
- Alexander Henderson Diack CVO, Indian Civil Service, Financial Commissioner, Punjab.
- Sao Mawng CIE KSM, Sawbwa of Yawnghwe, Burma, and a Member of the Council of the Lieutenant-Governor for making Laws and Regulations.
- His Highness Raja Arjun Singh, Chief of Narsingarh, Central India.
- Capt. Malik Umar Hayat Khan CIE MVO, of Kalra, in the Shahpur District, Punjab, an Additional Member of the Council of the Governor-General for making Laws and Regulations, in recognition of services during the War.

==== Companion (CIE) ====
- Col. William Montague Ellis, Royal Engineers, Chief Engineer and Secretary to the Government of Madras, Public Works Department, and an Additional Member of the Council of the Governor for making Laws and Regulations.
- Raja Venganad Vasudeva Raja Avargal, Valiya Nambidi of Kollengode, Malabar District, Madras.
- Lt.-Col. James Jackson MB, Indian Medical Service, Inspector-General of Prisons, Bombay, and an Additional Member of the Council of the Governor for making Laws and Regulations.
- James Anderson Dickson McBain, Honorary Secretary, Women's Branch, War and Relief Fund, Member of the Bombay Municipal Corporation, and an Additional Member of the Council of the Governor for making Laws and Regulations.
- Rao Bahadur Ganesh Krishna Sathe, Assistant Public Prosecutor, Sholapur Bombay, and an Additional Member of the Council of the Governor for making Laws and Regulations.
- Christopher Addams-Williams, Public Works Department, Superintending Engineer, South-Western Circle, Bengal.
- Raj Bansidhar Banerjee Bahadur, Provincial Executive Service, Second Land Acquisition Officer, Calcutta, Bengal.
- Hammett Reginald Clode Hailey, Indian Civil Service, Director of Land Records and Agriculture, United Provinces, and a Member of the Council of the Lieutenant-Governor for making Laws and Regulations.
- Robert Thomas Dundas, Indian Police, Inspector-General of Police, Bihar and Orissa, and an Additional Member of the Council of the Lieutenant-Governor for making Laws and Regulations.
- Reginald George Kilby, Indian Civil Service, Magistrate and Collector, Balasore, Bihar and Orissa.
- Robert Egerton Purves, Public Works Department (retired), lately Chief Engineer and Secretary to Government, Punjab, Irrigation Branch.
- Arthur Bradley Kettlewell, Indian Civil Service, Additional Secretary to Government, Punjab.
- Raj Bahadur Lala Ram Saran Das, a Member of the Council of the Lieutenant-Governor, Punjab, for making Laws and Regulations.
- Khan Bahadur Mian Muhammad Shafi, Barrister at-Law, Advocate of the Chief Court, Punjab, and a Member of the Council of the Governor-General for making Laws and Regulations.
- Hugh Aylmer Thornton, Indian Civil Service, Superintendent, Northern. Shan States, Burma.
- Charles Stewart Middleness FGS, Superintendent, Geological Survey of India.
- Major Frederick Norman White MD, Indian Medical Service, Assistant Director-General, Indian Medical Service (Sanitary).
- John Loader Maffey, Indian Civil Service, Private Secretary to the Viceroy, and lately Deputy Secretary in the Foreign and Political Department, Government of India.
- Diwan Bahadur Tiwari Chhajuram, Diwan of the Datia State, Central India.
- Seth Chandumal Dhudha, of Bikaner, Rajputana.
- Steuart Edmund Pears, Indian Civil Service, Political Agent, Khyber, North-West Frontier Province.
- William Nawton Maw, Indian Civil Service, Deputy Commissioner of Jubbulpore, Central Provinces.
- John Edward Webster, Indian Civil Service, Deputy Commissioner of Sylhet, Assam.

In recognition of services during the War:

- Capt. Alexander Gillilan Johnson MacIlwaine, Royal Army Medical Corps, Embarkation Medical Officer, Bombay.
- Col. Herbert Alexander Kaye Jennings, Royal Artillery, Director of Ordnance Stores in India.
- Lt.-Col. Thomas George Peacocke, Army Remount Department, Superintendent, Remount Depot, Ahmednagar.
- Major Edward William Crawfurd Ridgeway, 1st Battalion, 2nd King Edward's Own Gurkha Rifles (The Sirmoor Rifles), Recruiting Officer for Gurkhas.
- Capt. Edwin James Mollison, 125th Napier's Rifles Recruiting Officer for Punjabi Musalmans.
- Thomas Avery, Chief Constructor, Royal Indian Marine Dockyard, Bombay.
- Commander Ernest Whiteside Huddleston, Royal Indian Marine, Senior Marine Transport Officer, Bombay.
- Major Richard Alexander Steel, 17th Cavalry; Indian Army.
- Lt.-Col. John Walter Beresford Merewether, Supernumerary List, Indian Army, Political Department, Bombay.

=== The Royal Victorian Order ===
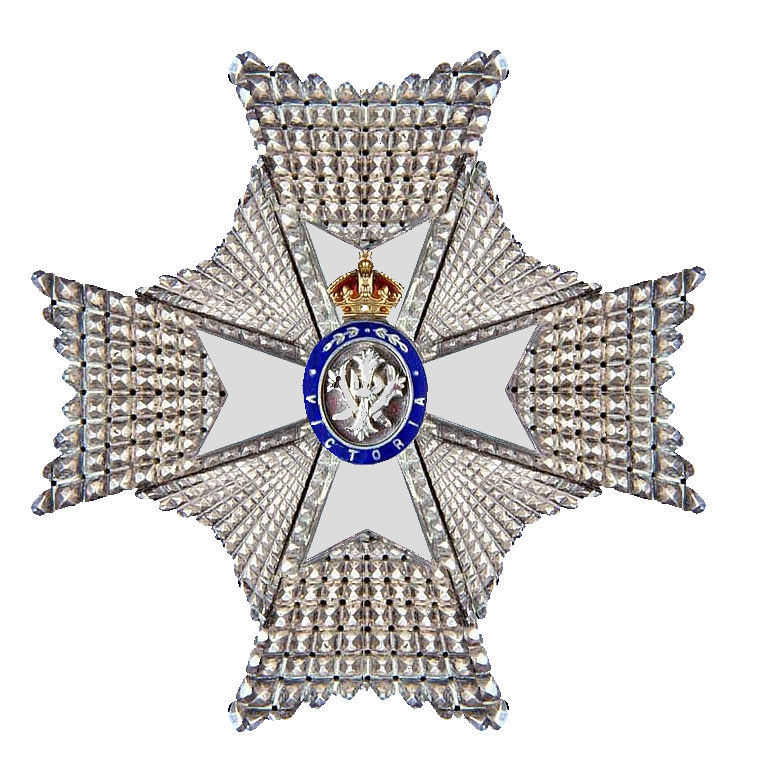
Insignia of a Knight / Dames Commander of the Royal Victorian Order

==== Knight Grand Cross of the Royal Victorian Order (GCVO) ====
- William Mansfield, Baron Sandhurst GCSI GCIE, Lord Chamberlain to His Majesty the King.

==== Knight Commander of the Royal Victorian Order (KCVO) ====
- Sir Thomas Little Heath KCB, Joint Permanent Secretary to the Treasury and Auditor of the Civil List.
- Lt.-Col. Malcolm Donald Murray CVO CB, (late Seaforth Highlanders), Comptroller to His Royal Highness the Duke of Connaught.
- Col. Henry Streatfeild CVO CB (Grenadier Guards), Private Secretary to Her Majesty Queen Alexandra.
- Edward William Wallington CVO CMG, Private Secretary to Her Majesty the Queen.

==== Commander of the Royal Victorian Order (CVO) ====
- Paymaster-in-Chief John Henry George Chappie CB MVO RN
- Walter Peacock MVO, Secretary to the Duchy of Cornwall.

==== Member of the Royal Victorian Order, 4th class (MVO) ====
- Capt. the Lord Claud Hamilton DSO (Grenadier Guards), attached to His Royal Highness the Prince of Wales.
- Noel Dean Bardswell MD, Medical Superintendent, King Edward VII's Sanatorium, Midhurst, Sussex.
- Frederick Stanley Hewett MD, Surgeon Apothecary to His Majesty the King.
- Engineer Lieutenant-Commander Réné Charles Hugill RN, late His Majesty's Yacht Victoria and Albert.
- Paymaster-in-chief Frederick William Mortimore, Royal Navy (retired), late His Majesty's Yacht Victoria and Albert.
- Major Reginald Henry Seymour, King's Royal Rifle Corps.

==== Member of the Royal Victorian Order, 5th class (MVO) ====
- Haywood Temple Holmes, Assistant Accountant to the Treasury.

=== Kaisar-i-Hind Medal ===
First Class

- Her Highness The Maharani of Panna
- Her Highness The Rani Sahiba Laxmibai Puar of Dhar, Central India
- The Rev. William Skinner MA DD, Principal of the Christian College, Madras
- Kate Graham, wife of Rev. J. A. Graham, of St. Andrew's Colonial Homes, Kalimpong, Bengal
- Rani Surat Kaur Sahiba, Landholder of Khairagarh, Kheri, United Provinces.
- Henry Martyn Newton FRCS, of the Church of Scotland Mission at Jalalpur Jattan, Gujrat, in the Punjab
- Robert George Robson MA MD CM, Chairman of the Municipal Committee of Ajmer
- Rev. Peter Cullen MD, Brig-Surgeon Lt.-Col. (retired) of Jubbulpore, Central Provinces.

=== Imperial Service Order (ISO) ===
Home Civil Service

- Samuel Bozman, Deputy Principal of the Statistical Office Customs and Excise.
- Francis Morgan Bryant MVO, Secretary of His Majesty's Private Secretary's Office.
- Mark Edwin Pescott Frost, Secretary to the Admiral. Superintendent, Portsmouth Dockyard.
- George William Lloyd, First Class Clerk, Board of Agriculture and Fisheries.
- Harry Archbutt Venables, Chief Examiner, Finance Department, War Office.
- Clement von Berg, Chief Clerk, National Debt Office.

Colonial Civil Service

- John Cullen, Commissioner of Police, Dominion of New Zealand.
- Édouard Gaston Daniel Deville, Surveyor-General, Topographical Surveys, Dominion of Canada.
- Frederick Joseph Glackmeyer, Sergeant-at-Arms of the Legislative Assembly of Ontario.
- William Charles Macready, Assistant Postmaster-General, Island of Ceylon.
- Joseph Henry Maiden, Director, Botanic Gardens and Government Botanist, State of New South Wales.
- Commander John Frederick Mills RN, Harbour Master, Selangor.
- Ressaldar Major Haji Musa Farah, lately Chief Native Assistant, Somaliland Protectorate.
- George Ng Fuk-shang, Clerk and Accountant, Police Department, Colony of Hong Kong.
- Edwin Mitchell Smith, Surveyor-General, State of South Australia.
- George Blackstone Williams, Senior Magistrate, Cape Town, Union of South Africa.

Indian Civil Service

- Frederick Talbot Eades, Senior Clerk, Store Department.
- Charles Norman Hall JP, Superintendent, Decca Convict Gang, Jail Department, Bombay.
- Parashuram Krishna Chitale LCE, Public Works Department, Bombay, Executive Engineer, Gujarat Irrigation District.
- John Arthur Evans Burrup, Assistant Collector of Customs, Calcutta.
- Khan Bahadur Rustomji Bamanji Vakil BA LLB, Senior Assistant Secretary, Revenue and Financial Departments, Bombay Government.
- Edmund Burke DVM FLS FZS Civil Veterinary Department, Professor of Surgery, Punjab Veterinary College, Lahore, Punjab.
- Simon Mackertich Minus, Deputy Registrar of the Chief Court of Burma.
- Khan Bahadur Sayyid Muhammad Mustafa, Deputy Collector and Special Manager of the Nanpara Estate, United Provinces.
- Richard Henry Blaker, Registrar, Government of India, Education Department.
- Maung Tun Nyein, Extra Assistant Commissioner and Government Translator, Burma.

=== Distinguished Service Order (DSO) ===
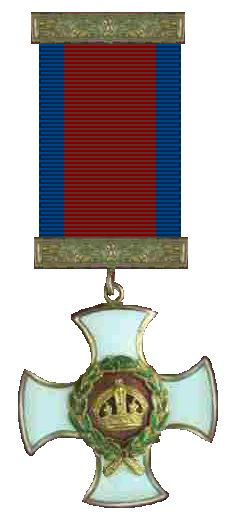
Riband and cross of the Distinguished Service Order

- Maj. William Maxwell Acton, Royal Irish Rifles
- Maj. and Brevet Lt.-Col. Robert Berkeley Airey, Army Service Corps
- Maj. John James Aitken, Army Veterinary Corps
- Maj. James Whitelaw Alexander, West Yorkshire Regiment
- Capt. Henry Malcolm Jerome Alves, Royal Artillery
- Maj. Clifford Reginald Templeman Annesley, Army Service Corps
- Maj. Charles Clement Armitage, Royal Artillery
- Maj. Herbert Tollemache Arnold, Army Pay Dept
- Maj. Herbert Vale Bagshawe, Royal Army Medical Corps
- Maj. George Henry Barnett, King's Royal Rifle Corps
- Maj. Basil Sorley Bartlett, Royal Army Medical Corps
- Lt.-Col. John Samuel Jocelyn Baumgartner, East Lancashire Regiment
- Maj. Arthur George Bayley, Oxfordshire and Buckinghamshire Light Infantry
- Capt. William Mabisse Beckwith, late Coldstream Guards
- Maj. (temp. Lt.-Col.) Bertram Langdon Beddy, Army Service Corps
- Maj. Arthur Hugh Bell, Royal Engineers
- Capt. Joseph Benskin, Royal Engineers
- Maj. Henry Percy Frank Bicknell, Middlesex Regiment
- Maj. Charles Henry Marion Bingham, Army Service Corps
- Capt. Charles Cautley Blackburn, late Norfolk Regiment
- Temp. Lt.-Col. Cyril Aubrey Blacklock, King's Royal Rifle Corps
- Maj. Gerald Charles Gordon Blunt, Army Service Corps
- Maj. Henry Griffith Boone, Royal Artillery
- Maj. Thomas Macaulay Booth, Gordon Highlanders
- Lt.-Col. Ernest Albert Bourke, Royal Army Medical Corps
- Maj. John de Vere Bowles, Royal Artillery
- Maj. Henry Alexander Boyd, Royal Artillery
- Capt. The Hon. Roger Brand, Rifle Brigade
- Maj. and Hon Lt.-Col. Arthur William Brewill, Nottinghamshire and Derbyshire Regiment
- Lt.-Col. Eardley Wilmot Brooke, Army Service Corps
- Maj. Percy Robert Bruce, Nottinghamshire Yeomanry
- Capt. and Brevet Maj. George Bull, Royal Irish Fusiliers, Royal Irish Rifles
- Capt. Eric de Burgh, 9th Hodson's Horse, Indian Army
- Maj. William Burnett, North Staffordshire Regiment
- Maj. Reginald Francis Amhurst Butterworth, Royal Engineers
- Maj. Anthony Buxton, Essex Yeomanry
- Maj. John Laurence Buxton, Rifle Brigade
- Maj. Ernest Lawrence Caldecott, Royal Artillery
- Maj. Keith Gordon Campbell, Royal Artillery, attached 26th Jacob's Mountain Battery, Indian Army
- Maj. Norman St. Clair Campbell, Royal Artillery
- Maj. Charles Murray Carpenter, Royal Engineers
- Maj. Charles Ronald Brownlow Carrington, Royal Artillery
- Maj. William Francis Challinor, Royal Field Artillery
- Capt. Edward Tankerville Chamberlayne, Warwickshire Yeomanry
- Capt. Clement Hope Rawdon Chesney, Royal Engineers
- Lt.-Col. Sir Smith Hill Child Bt MVO, Royal Field Artillery
- Capt. David Brynmor Chiles-Evans MB, Royal Army Medical Corps
- Maj. Cecil Horace Clark, Royal Artillery
- Maj. Harry Clissold, Royal Engineers
- Maj. Louis William la Trobe Cockcraft, Royal Artillery
- Maj. Jacob Waley Cohen, 16th Battalion, London Regiment
- Capt. John Francis Stanhope Duke Coleridge, 8th Gurkha Rifles, Indian Army
- Capt. Dudley Stuart Collins. Royal Engineers
- Capt. Hamilton Stratford Collins, Shropshire Light Infantry
- Maj. Robert John Collins, Royal Berkshire Regiment
- Lt.-Col. Charles Sydney Collison, Middlesex Regiment, Royal Warwickshire Regiment
- Maj. Gerald Conder, Army Veterinary Corps
- Maj. and Brevet Lt.-Col. Bertram Hewett Hunter Cooke, Rifle Brigade
- Maj. Harold Temple Cotton, South Lancashire Regiment
- Surg.-Maj. Robert Macnamara Cowie, 1st Life Guards
- Maj. Hugh Cracroft, Army Service Corps
- Maj. Reginald Baskerville Jervis Crawfurd, Coldstream Guards
- Maj. Edmund Fraser Creswell, Royal Artillery
- Maj. Sydney D'Aguilar Crookshank CIE MVO, Royal Engineers
- Maj. George William Kilner Crosland, late West Riding Regiment
- Maj. Ernest Jackson Cummins, Royal Artillery
- Temp. Maj. Thomas Latimer Cunningham, Cameron Highlanders
- Capt. Cyril Samuel Sackville Curteis, Royal Artillery
- Maj. Bertram William Young Danford, Royal Engineers
- Capt. John Clive Darling, 20th Hussars
- Maj. John May Darling MB FRCS, Royal Army Medical Corps
- Lt.-Col. Samuel Davenport, Gloucestershire Regiment
- Temp. Maj. Arthur Henry Davis, Army Service Corps
- Maj. (temp. Lt.-Col.) Gronow John Davis, 22nd Punjabis, Indian Army, King's Royal Rifle Corps
- Maj. Addis Delacombe, Army Pay Department
- Maj. Harry Denison, Royal Artillery
- Capt. (temp. Capt. Royal Engineers) Wilfrid Thomas Dodd, Royal Engineers
- Maj. (temp. Lt.-Col.) William Drury Drury-Lowe, Capt, Royal Field Artillery
- Maj. Joseph Cameron Dunbar, Royal Artillery
- Maj. Kenneth Duncan, Royal Field Artillery
- Capt. Frederick Eaves, Royal Lancaster Regiment
- Lt.-Col. Archibald James Fergusson Eden, Oxfordshire and Buckinghamshire Light Infantry
- Capt. Charles William Edwards, Army Service Corps
- Maj. Hugh Jamieson Elles, Royal Engineers
- Maj. Arthur Edward Erskine, Royal Artillery
- Maj. Sir Thomas Wilfrid Hargreaves John Erskine Bt, Cameron Highlanders
- Maj. Arthur Erskine-Murray, Royal Artillery
- Maj. Oscar Lewis Eugster, Honourable Artillery Company
- Qrmr. and Hon. Maj. Arthur Edward Everingham, Royal Scots
- Capt. Charles Ariel Evill, Monmouthshire Regiment
- Maj. Frank Simeon Exham, Army Ordnance Depot
- Maj. Charles Gordon Falcon, Royal Engineers
- Maj. Philip Vernon le Geyt Falle, Army Service Corps
- Maj. James Farquhar, Royal Artillery
- Maj. Charles Farrant, Royal Army Medical Corps
- Maj. Arthur Herbert Broom Faster, Royal Lancaster Regiment
- Maj. Ralph Frankland Morris Fawcett, Royal Army Medical Corps
- Maj. Timothy Fetherstonhaugh, Seaforth Highlanders
- Capt. Charles Robert Lewis FitzGerald, 126th Baluchis, Indian Army
- Capt. Horace John Flower, King's Royal Rifle Corps
- Lt.-Col. Thomas Henderson Forrest MB, Royal Army Medical Corps
- Maj. David Forster, Royal Engineers
- Capt. and Brevet Maj. Victor Morven Fortune, Royal Highlanders
- Maj. Alastair Norman Fraser MB, Royal Army Medical Corps
- Maj. George Ireland Fraser, Cameron Highlanders
- Maj. and Brevet Lt.-Col. Henry Francis Edward Freeland MVO, Royal Engineers
- Maj. and Brevet Lt.-Col. Gilbert Robertson Frith, Royal Engineers
- Capt. Eric Dalrymple Gairdner MB, Royal Army Medical Corps
- Lt.-Col. James Stuart Gallie, Royal Army Medical Corps
- Temp. Maj. George Henry Gater, Nottinghamshire and Derbyshire Regiment
- Maj. William Alexander Stewart Gemmell, Royal Horse Artillery
- Capt. Thomas Gibbons, Essex Regiment
- Capt. Edward Douglas Giles, 35th Scinde Horse, Indian Army
- Maj. Alexander Inglis Robertson Glasfurd, 46th Punjabis, Indian Army
- Maj. Alfred Edgar Glasgow, Royal Sussex Regiment
- Maj. Harry Dundas Goldsmith, Duke of Cornwall's Light Infantry
- Maj. Bertrand Gorges Reginald Gordon, Gordon Highlanders
- Maj. Evelyn Boscawen Gordon, Northumberland Fusiliers
- Temp. Lt.-Col. Edward Hyde Hamilton Gordon, Gordon Highlanders
- Maj. Arthur Kenneth Grant, Royal West Kent Regiment
- Maj. Dudley Harcourt Fleming Grant, Lincolnshire Regiment
- Maj. Clive Osric Vere Gray, Seaforth Highlanders
- Temp. Lt.-Col. John Anselm Samuel Gray, Special List
- Lt.-Col. John Grech, Royal Army Medical Corps
- Maj. Henry Clifford Rodes Green, King's Royal Rifle Corps
- Maj. John Joseph Griffith FRCVS, Army Veterinary Corps
- Capt. Harold St. George Hamersley, Army Service Corps
- Lt.-Col. Claud Lorn Campbell Hamilton, Royal Artillery
- Capt. and Brevet Maj. James Melvill Hamilton, Gordon Highlanders
- Maj. Robert Hamilton-Stubber, South Irish Horse, attached to 1st Life Guards
- Maj. Reginald Chalmers Hammond, Royal Engineers
- Maj. (temp. Lt.-Col.) Antony Ernest Wentworth Harman, 2nd Dragoon Guards, 18th Hussars
- Maj. Herbert Roche Hayter, Army Service Corps
- Maj. John Raph Hedley, Northumberland Fusiliers (Territorial Force), Border Regiment
- Maj. Kenneth Henderson, 39th Garhwal Rifles, Indian Army
- Maj. Patrick Hagart Henderson MB, Royal Army Medical Corps
- Capt. and Brevet Maj. The Hon. Anthony Morton Henley, 5th Lancers
- Maj. Louis William Herbert, South Lancashire Regiment
- Maj. George Wykeham Heron, Royal Army Medical Corps
- Capt. Alfred Herbert Heslop MB, Royal Army Medical Corps
- Capt. The Hon. Evelyn James Hewitt, Dorsetshire Regiment
- Maj. Cecil Percival Heywood, Coldstream Guards
- Maj. Charles Lawrence Hickling, Royal Artillery
- Maj. Walter Pitts Hendy Hill, Royal Fusiliers
- Maj. Lionel Lennard Hoare, Army Ordnance Depot
- Maj. Clarence John Hobkirk, Essex Regiment
- Capt. John Rowland Hodgkins FRCVS, Army Veterinary Corps
- Temp. Maj. Frank Hodsoll, Army Service Corps
- Maj. Philip Granville Hardinge Hogg, Royal Engineers
- Maj. Arthur Ernest Holbrook, Army Service Corps
- Maj. Edmund Locock Hughes, Northamptonshire Regiment
- Maj. Thomas Edward Carew Hunt, Royal Berkshire Regiment
- Maj. Charles Finlayson Hunter, 4th Dragoon Guards
- Capt. George Staunton Husband MB, Indian Medical Service
- Maj. Percy Leigh Ingpen, West Yorkshire Regiment
- Maj. John O'Donnell Ingram, Gloucestershire Regiment
- Capt. George Scott Jackson, Northumberland Fusiliers
- Maj. Edmond James Jameson, Leinster Regiment
- Maj. Edward Harvey Jarvis, Royal Inniskilling Fusiliers
- Maj. Richard Vincent Jellicoe, late Royal Engineers
- Capt. Leopold Christian Duncan Jenner, late King's Royal Rifle Corps
- Maj. Francis Garven Dillon Johnston, Royal Field Artillery
- Capt. Conrad Routh Jones, Army Ordnance Depot
- Maj. William Allen Frere Jones, Royal Artillery
- Temp. Major Philip Walter Jupe, Motor Machine Gun Service
- Maj. Harold Swift Kaye, Yorkshire Light Infantry
- Temp. Maj. Philip Travice Rubie Kellner, Royal Engineers
- Capt. William Hyde Kelly, Royal Engineers
- Maj. Henry Brewster Percy Lion Kennedy, King's Royal Rifle Corps, London Regiment
- Capt. Roger John Brownlow Keyes CB CMG MVO ADC RN, (Commodore, 2nd Class)
- Maj. William Albert de Courcy King, Royal Engineers
- Maj. and Brevet Lt.-Col. Walter Mervyn St. George Kirke, Royal Artillery
- Temp. Maj. James George Kirkwood, Gloucestershire Regiment
- Capt. Charles Edward Kitchin, South Wales Borderers
- Capt. Charles Louis William Morley Knight, late Royal Artillery
- Temp. Maj. James Leadbitter Knott, West Yorkshire Regiment
- Maj. (temp. Lt.-Col.) Bertram John Lang, Argyll and Sutherland Highlanders
- Maj. Owen Mortimer Lanyon, Royal Artillery
- Capt. Frederick William Bernardine Law, South Staffordshire Regiment
- Maj. Percy Gerald Parker Lea, Army Service Corps
- Maj. Price Kinnear Lewes, Royal Artillery
- Maj. Ernest Albert Lewis, Royal Engineers
- Maj. David John Lidbury, Royal Engineers
- Maj. Frederick Hamilton Lister, Royal Artillery
- Capt. Frederick Shirley Litchfield-Speer RN
- Maj. Walter Francis Lucey, Royal Field Artillery
- Capt. Colmer William Donald Lynch, Yorkshire Light Infantry
- Maj. Claude Darey George Lyon, Royal Artillery
- Maj. Arthur Gabell Macdonald, Royal Berkshire Regiment
- Maj. Kenneth Lachlan MacDonald, 1st Lovat's Scouts, Yeomanry
- Capt. Percy Wilfrid Machell CMG, Border Regiment
- Maj. and Brevet Lt.-Col. George Birnie Mackenzie, Royal Artillery
- Lt.-Col. Ronald Campbell Maclachlan, Rifle Brigade
- Maj. Meredith Magniac, Lancashire Fusiliers
- Maj. Claud Archibald Scott Maitland, Gordon Highlanders
- Maj. Hubert William Man, Army Ordnance Depot
- Maj. Henry Seymour Marshall, Royal Artillery
- Capt. Giffard Le Quesne Martel, Royal Engineers
- Capt. Glyn Keith Murray Mason, 14th Hussars
- Capt. and Brevet Maj. Seaton Dunham Massy, Royal Flying Corps, Indian Army
- Lt.-Col. Walter Hudson Matthews, 19th Battalion, London Regiment
- Maj. Edmund Joseph McAllister, Army Service Corps
- Maj. Maurice Edwin McConaghey, Royal Scots Fusiliers
- Capt. John Gerald McConaghy, 25th Cavalry, Indian Army
- Lt.-Col. James Douglas McLachlan, Cameron Highlanders
- Maj. Edmund Richard Meade-Waldo, Rifle Brigade
- Maj. Philip Albert Meldon, Royal Artillery
- Maj. Abel Mellor, Royal Artillery
- Maj. George Feilden Menzies, Durham Light Infantry
- Maj. Arthur Drummond Nairne Merriman, Royal Irish Rifles
- Temp. Maj. Francis Edward Metcalfe, Lincolnshire Regiment
- Maj. Archibald Henry Moberly, Royal Artillery
- Temp. Lt.-Col. Edgar Monteagle-Browne, Royal Munster Fusiliers
- Maj. Maxton Moore, Army Service Corps
- Maj. George William Sterne Morris, Royal Field Artillery
- Capt. James Archibald Morrison, Grenadier Guards
- Capt. John Harold Mousley, Royal Engineers
- Maj. Edward Newman Mozley, Royal Engineers
- Lt.-Col. William Murray-Threipland, Welsh Guards
- Temp. Maj. Edward Christopher Musgrave, King's Royal Rifle Corps
- Capt. Sydney Frederick Muspratt, 12th Cavalry, Indian Army
- Maj. and Brevet Lt.-Col. Ethelbert Monk Newell, Royal Engineers
- Maj. (temp. Maj. Royal Engineers) Stanley Monk Newell, Royal Engineers
- Capt. Henry Newton, Nottinghamshire and Derbyshire Regiment
- Temp. Maj. Herbert Niblett, Army Service Corps
- Maj. Walter Norris Nicholson, Suffolk Regiment
- Maj. Oswald Carmichael Niven, Royal Artillery
- Maj. James Arundel Nixon, Royal Lancaster Regiment
- Maj. Edward Hubert Norman, Royal West Kent Regiment., London Regiment
- Maj. Arthur Northen, Army Service Corps
- Maj. Walter Vyvian Nugent, Royal Artillery
- Capt. William Francis Dixon Nuttall, Royal Engineers
- Qtr. and Hon. Maj. Timothy O'Shea, 9th Battalion, London Regiment
- Maj. George Muir Oldham, Royal Engineers
- Maj. Thomas Ormsby, Army Paymasters Department
- Maj. Reginald Arthur Herbert Orpen-Palmer, Leinster Regiment
- Maj. Arthur Carr Osburn, Royal Army Medical Corps
- Maj. Sydney Lloyd Owen, Royal Engineers
- Maj. William Vere Packe, Royal Field Artillery
- Maj. Cuthbert Frederick Graham Page, Royal Artillery
- Temp. Lt.-Col. Cecil Walter Paget, Royal Engineers
- Temp. Maj. Hugh John Chevallier Peirs, Royal West Surrey Regiment
- Capt. Hon. Dudley Roger Hugh Pelham, late 10th Hussars
- Maj. and Brevet Lt.-Col. Charles Foskett Phipps, Royal Artillery
- Maj. William Norman Pilkington, South Lancashire Regiment
- Maj. Marcus John Barre de la Poer Beresford, South Wales Borderers
- Maj. Herbert de Lisle Pollard-Lowsley CIE, Royal Engineers
- Capt. Sydney Buxton Pope, 58th Vaughan's Rifles, Indian Army
- Maj. Claud Furniss Potter, Royal Artillery
- Maj. Philip Lionel William Powell, Welsh Regiment
- Maj. Robert Emile Shepherd Prentice, Highland Light Infantry
- Temp. Maj. Harold Astley Somerset Prior, Yorkshire Regiment
- Maj. Hon. Henry Cornelius O'Callaghan Prittie, Rifle Brigade
- Maj. and Brevet Lt.-Col. Charles Bertie Prowse, Somerset Light Infantry
- Capt. and Brevet Maj. John Henry Purvis, Highland Light Infantry
- Maj. and Brevet Lt.-Col. Percy Pollexfen de Blaquiere Radcliffe, Royal Artillery
- Maj. Hilton Alexander Ramsay, Royal Artillery
- Maj. Robert Richmond Raymer, South Staffordshire Regiment
- Maj. William Bryan Fleetwood Rayner, Royal Fusiliers
- Capt. John Jeffrey Readman, 2nd Dragoons
- Capt. William Knowles Rebsch, Supply and Transport Corps, Indian Army
- Maj. Frederic James Reid, Army Service Corps
- Maj. Edward Harrison Rigg, Yorkshire Light Infantry
- Capt. Alexander Robertson, Royal Engineers
- Maj. Hugh Stuart Rogers, Shropshire Light Infantry
- Maj. Alexander Rolland, Royal Engineers
- Capt. and Brevet Maj. Arthur Justin Ross, Royal Engineers and Royal Flying Corps
- Maj. and Brevet Lt.-Col. Claude Russell-Brown, Royal Engineers
- Maj. and Brevet Lt.-Col. Arthur Richard Careless Sanders, Royal Engineers
- Maj. Patrick Barclay Sangster, 2nd Lancers, Indian Army
- Maj. Henry Valentine Bache de Satge, Royal Field Artillery
- Temp. Maj. Reginald George Francis Saunders, Army Service Corps
- Maj. Guy Henry Sawyer, Royal Berkshire Regiment
- Maj. William Ernest Scafe, Devonshire Regiment
- Maj. Alfred George Scammell, Royal Field Artillery
- Maj. John Creagh Scott, Argyll and Sutherland Highlanders
- Lt.-Col. Evelyn Pierce Sewell MB, Royal Army Medical Corps
- Maj. Lord Henry Charles Seymour, Grenadier Guards
- Maj. William John Shannon, 16th Lancers
- Maj. John Joseph Shute, Liverpool Regiment
- Maj. John Norman Sinclair, Royal Artillery
- Maj. Edward John Skinner, Royal Artillery
- Capt. William Clayton Smales, Royal Army Medical Corps
- Maj. George Alexander Smith, Gordon Highlanders (Territorial Force), Royal Lancaster Regiment
- Maj. Harry Reginald Walter Marriott Smith, Royal Artillery
- Maj. John Grant Smith, Seaforth Highlanders
- Capt. Humphry Waugh Snow, late Royal West Kent Regiment
- Capt. Maurice Eden Sowerby, Royal Engineers
- Maj. William Moore Bell Sparkes, Royal Army Medical Corps
- Maj. Leonard Kengon Stanbrough, Royal Artillery
- Lt.-Col. Davison Bruce Stewart, Royal Artillery
- Capt. Richard Edgar Sugden, West Riding Regiment
- Maj. Frederick Sutton, Royal Artillery
- Maj. Joseph Leonard Swainson, Duke of Cornwall's Light Infantry
- Maj. Cuthbert Gambier Ryves Sydney-Turner, Army Service Corps
- Capt. Maurice Grove Taylor, Royal Engineers
- Maj. Arthur Cecil Temperley, Norfolk Regiment
- Maj. Charles Bouverie Thackeray, Royal Artillery
- Maj. Frederick Vivian Thompson, Royal Engineers
- Maj. Charles Pinkerton Thomson MD, Royal Army Medical Corps
- Maj. Noel Arbuthnot Thomson, Seaforth Highlanders
- Maj. Roger Gordon Thomson, Royal Artillery
- Lt. George Leslie Torrens, West India Regiment (employed with Lancashire Fusiliers)
- Capt. Reginald Yorke Tyrwhitt CB RN, (Commodore, 1st Class)
- Capt. John Percy Delabene Underwood, Loyal North Lancashire Regiment (attached to Nigeria Regiment)
- Maj. Edward James Forrester Vaughan, Devonshire Regiment
- Maj. Edward Gurth Wace, Royal Engineers
- Maj. Hugh Godfrey Killigrew Wait, Royal Engineers
- Capt. James Walker, East Riding of Yorkshire Yeomanry
- Maj. Reginald Selby Walker, Royal Engineers
- Temp. Lt.-Col. Hugh Robert Wallace, Suffolk Regiment, late Gordon Highlanders
- Capt. Robert Jocelyn Rowan Waller, Royal Artillery (attached to Nigeria Regiment)
- Maj. Ernest Arnold Wallinger, Royal Artillery
- Maj. Cusack Walton, Royal Engineers
- Temp. Lt.-Col. George Edward Wannell, West Riding Regiment
- Maj. Hugh Valentine Warrender, London Regiment
- Capt. Alfred Edward Webb-Johnson MB FRCS, Royal Army Medical Corps
- Maj. Norman William Webber, Royal Engineers
- Maj. (temp. Lt.-Col.) William Hermann Frank Weber, Royal Artillery
- Capt. Joseph Harold Stops Westley, Yorkshire Regiment
- Maj. Joseph Robert Wethered, Gloucestershire Regiment
- Maj. Harold Fife Whinney, Royal Fusiliers
- Lt.-Col. Geoffrey Herbert Anthony White, Royal Artillery
- Capt. James Whitehead, 1st Brahmans, Indian Army
- Maj. (temp. Lt.-Col.) John Tyson Wigan, Berkshire Yeomanry., late 13th Hussars
- Capt. Robert Hugh Willan, King's Royal Rifle Corps (attached to Signal Service, Royal Engineers)
- Maj. Robert Carlisle Williams, Royal Artillery
- Capt. Montague Harry Sherwood Willis, Suffolk Regiment, attached to Nigeria Regiment
- Maj. Patrick Hogarth Wilson, Royal Artillery, attached to Royal Field Artillery
- Capt. and Brevet Maj. The Hon. Maurice Anthony Wingfield, Rifle Brigade
- Maj. Louis John Wyatt, North Staffordshire Regiment, York and Lancaster Regiment
- Lt.-Col. John Watkins Yardley, retired pay

Australian Imperial Force

- Act Lt.-Commdr. Leighton Seymour Bracegirdle, Royal Australian Naval Bridging Train
- Capt. Thomas Frederick Brown, Army Medical Corps
- Maj. Charles Moreland Montague Dare, 14th Battalion
- Capt. Ronald Douglas Campbell, Army Medical Corps
- Maj. Richard Francis Fitzgerald, 20th Battalion
- Maj. Frederick Howard Francis, Army Service Corps
- Maj. Cecil Horace Granville, 1st Light Horse Regiment
- Hon. Capt. Thomas Griffiths, Staff
- Maj. Albert Armytage Holdsworth, Army Service Corps
- Capt. Raymond Lionel Leane, 11th Battalion
- Capt. Charles Augustus Littler, 12th Battalion
- Maj. Frank William le Maistre, 5th Battalion
- Maj. Eliezer Margolin, 16th Battalion
- Maj. John Barr McLean, Army Medical Corps
- Capt. Edmund Osborn Milne, Army Service Corps
- Maj. Reginald John Albert Travers, 17th Battalion
- Maj. Bertram Alexander Gordon Watts, Royal Australian Garrison Artillery
- Maj. Evan Alexander Wisdom, Commonwealth Military Forces

Canadian Force

- Maj. Agar Stuart Allan Masterton Adamson, Princess Patricia's Canadian Light Infantry
- Lt.-Col. William Donald Allan, 3rd Infantry Battalion, 15th Divisional Signal Company
- Maj. Reginald James Brook, 3rd Infantry Battalion
- Lt.-Col. Raymond Brutinel, Canadian Motor Machine Gun Brigade
- Lt.-Col. Victor Carl Buchanan, 13th Infantry Battalion
- Maj. Alexander George Cameron, 13th Infantry Battalion
- Maj. Alfred Cecil Critchley, Lord Strathcona's Horse
- Maj. Malcolm Docherty, Lord Strathcona's Horse
- Brevet Lt.-Col. James Harold Elmsley, Royal Canadian Dragoons
- Maj. Elroyd Ford, 15th Divisional Signal Company
- Maj. Donald Faville Branston Gray, Princess Patricia's Canadian Light Infantry
- Maj. Leslie Earls Haines, 7th Infantry Battalion
- Maj. Thomas Craik Irving, Canadian Engineers
- Maj. Thomas Malcolm McAvity, 5th Canadian Infantry Brigade
- Maj. James Edgar Mills, Royal Canadian Horse Artillery
- Lt.-Col. Charles Hamilton Mitchell, Canadian Force
- Maj. Thomas Sydney Morrisey, 13th Infantry Battalion
- Lt.-Col. Coote Nesbitt Shanly, Canadian Army Pay Corps

New Zealand Imperial Force

- Maj. William Semmers Austen, 1st Battalion, N.Z. Rifle Brigade
- Maj. Henry Esau Avery, No. 1 Company, Divisional Train
- Lt.-Col. Robert Renton Grigor, Otago Mounted Rifles Regiment
- Maj. Herbert Clarence Hurst, Canterbury Mounted Rifles Regiment
- Maj. George Augustus King, Staff Corps
- Capt. Charles Guy Powles, Staff Corps
- Maj. Ralph Wyman, Auckland Mounted Rifles Regiment

South African Defence Forces

- Maj. James Mitchell Baker

=== Military Cross (MC) ===
- Capt. H.R.H. Edward Albert Christian George Andrew Patrick David, Prince of Wales and Duke of Cornwall KG, Grenadier Guards
- 2nd Lt. Richard Oliver Ackerley, South Wales Borderers
- Temp. Capt. Arthur de Bels Adam, Liverpool Regiment
- Lt. Edward Sydney Royston Adams, Royal Engineers
- Capt. Kenneth Morland Agnew, Royal Field Artillery
- Lt. David Lyulph Gore Wolseley, Earl of Airlie, 10th Hussars
- 2nd Lt. Charles Fleming Aitken, Welsh Horse Yeomanry
- Capt. Alexander Claud Allan, Cameron Highlanders
- 2nd Lt. David Bruce Allan, Royal Scots
- Capt. George Wigram Dundas Allen, Liverpool Regiment, and Royal Flying Corps
- Capt. John Frederick Whitacre Allen, East Kent Regiment
- 2nd Lt. Arthur John Allmand, Cheshire Regiment
- Temp. Capt. Charles E. Amphlett, Motor Machine Gun Service
- Lt. Keith Anderson, Royal Field Artillery
- Lt. Patrick Campbell Anderson, Seaforth Highlanders
- Temp. Lt. Stuart. Gordon Anderson, Royal Engineers
- Lt. David Dick Anderson, East Yorkshire Regiment
- Capt. Arthur Emilius David Anderson, King's Own Scottish Borderers
- Temp. Lt. Goldie Fraser Anderson, Royal Engineers
- Temp. 2nd Lt. William Anderson, Cameron Highlanders
- Temp. 2nd Lt. Claude Outram Dalgairns Anderson, Motor Machine Gun Corps
- 2nd Lt. George Roddam Angus, Durham Light Infantry
- Capt. Philip Noel Anstruther, Royal West Kent Regiment
- Capt. Allan Cholmondeley Arnold, Middlesex Regiment
- Rev. Harold Stanley Astbury, Army Chaplains' Department
- Lt. Owen Dayott Atkinson, Royal Engineers
- Capt. Gerald Aylmer, Supply and Transport Corps, Indian Army
- 2nd Lt. Philip Babington, Hampshire Regiment, and Royal Flying Corps
- Capt. Robert John Halkett Baddeley, 15th Lancers, Indian Army
- Capt. Charles Lane Bagnall, Durham Light Infantry
- 2nd Lt. Ernest Alfred Baker, Royal Sussex Regiment
- 2nd Lt. Francis Douglas Baker, Royal 1st Devonshire Yeomanry
- Capt. Ernest Herbert Campbell Bald, late 15th Hussars
- 2nd Lt. Charles James Prior Ball, Royal Artillery
- Temp. Lt. Charles Thomas Ball, Hampshire Regiment
- Lt. Edward Nettleton Balme, Essex Regiment
- Temp. 2nd Lt. Hubert Beaumont Balmforth, North Lancashire Regiment
- Lt. Albert Methuen Bankier, Argyll and Sutherland Highlanders
- Lt. Herbert Graham Barber, York and Lancaster Regiment
- 2nd Lt. Alfred Edmund Barlow, Manchester Regiment
- Lt. Vincent Hope Barnard, 6th Dragoon Guards
- Temp. Capt. Arthur Gordon Barry, Lancashire Fusiliers
- 2nd Lt. John Anderson Barstow, Argyll and Sutherland Highlanders
- Lt. James Wilfred Battersby, Royal Field Artillery
- 2nd Lt. Fred Oscar Baxter, Indian Army
- Qtr.-Mst. and Hon. Capt. Richard Thomas Baxter, Royal Munster Fusiliers
- Qtr.-Mst. and Hon Lt. Francis John Bayman, Army Service Corps
- Capt. (temp. Maj.) Beaumont Henry Beaumont-Checkland, Nottinghamshire and Derbyshire Regiment
- Temp. Lt. Claude Waylen Bell, Intelligence Corps
- 2nd Lt. Pearson Bell, Welsh Regiment
- 2nd Lt. Douglas Herbert Bell, Cameron Highlanders
- Temp. 2nd Lt. George Robert Bernard, Essex Regiment
- Lt. Horatio Pettus Mackintosh Berney-Ficklin, Norfolk Regiment
- Lt. Edward Fleetwood Berry, 1/9th Gurkha Rifles, Indian Army
- Lt. Bryan Bertram Bellew, Royal Irish Rifles
- 2nd Lt. Lawrence Trounce Gregory Vernon Biden, Royal Warwickshire Regiment
- 2nd Lt. George Brown Bird, Royal Warwickshire Regiment
- Temp. Capt. Benedict Birkbeck, Coldstream Guards, Machine Gun Company
- Temp. Capt. Gurth Swinnerton Blandy MD, Royal Army Medical Corps
- Lt. Jack Frederick Bligh, Royal Field Artillery
- Capt. William Senhouse Blunt, Royal Engineers
- 2nd Lt. Hubert Cave Blyde, Berkshire Yeomanry
- Qtr.-Mst. and Hon. Capt. Sydney Thomas Boast, South Lancashire Regiment
- Lt. John Boast, South Lancashire Regiment
- Temp. Capt. Myles Boddington, Shropshire Light Infantry
- Capt. Ronald Victor Courtenay Bodley, King's Royal Rifle Corps
- Capt. Alister Cheney Bolton, Royal Scots Fusiliers and Royal Flying Corps
- 2nd Lt. Geoffrey George Hargreaves Bolton, East Lancashire Regiment
- Temp. Capt. Lawrence Owen Bosworth, Intelligence Corps
- Temp. 2nd Lt. Alec Edward Boucher, Royal Warwickshire Regiment
- 2nd Lt. Frank Everard Boundy, Liverpool Regiment
- Capt. Geoffrey Arthur Holme Bower, Middlesex Regiment
- Temp. Capt. Ernest John Egerton Boys, Royal Garrison Artillery
- 2nd Lt. Henry Bracken, Royal West Kent Regiment
- Lt. Samuel Glenholme Lennox Bradley, 16th Battalion, London Regiment
- 2nd Lt. Swinfen Bramley Moore, Army Service Corps
- Capt. John Charles Brand, Coldstream Guards
- Capt. William Adam Brechin MB, Royal Army Medical Corps
- Temp. Capt. Alexander Bremner MB, Royal Army Medical Corps
- Capt. Athelstan Dermot St. George Bremner, Royal Engineers
- Temp. 2nd Lt. Harold Sidney Bright, Special List
- Temp. 2nd Lt. John Broadwood, Royal Scots
- 2nd Lt. John Gleave Brocklehurst, Army Service Corps
- Lt. Arthur William Brocks, Worcestershire Regiment
- 2nd Lt. Ian Ashley Moreton Brodie of Brodie DSO, Lovat's Scouts Yeomanry
- Lt. Sir Basil Stanlake Brooke Bt, 10th Hussars
- Temp. Capt. Roderick St. Clair Brooke, Yorkshire Light Infantry
- Battery Sgt.-Maj. George Ernest Brooks, Royal Horse Artillery
- Sgt.-Maj. Robert Brown, Royal West Kent Regiment
- Lt. Robert Weston Brooke, Yorkshire Dragoons
- Temp. 2nd Lt. Douglas Fraser Bruce, Rifle Brigade
- Capt. Harold Kendal Walpole Bruce, 2/2nd Gurkha Rifles, Indian Army
- Capt. Lewis Campbell Bruce MD FRCP, Royal Army Medical Corps
- Temp. Capt. Basil George Bryant, Durham Light Infantry
- Temp. Capt. Angus Buchanan, South Wales Borderers
- Temp. Capt. Anthony Stuart Buckland-Cockell, Special List
- Temp. Capt. John Buckley, General List
- Capt. Francis William Bullock-Marsham, 19th Hussars
- 2nd Lt. John Crocker Bulteel, Buckinghamshire Yeomanry
- Temp. Capt. Arthur Burtenshaw, Army Service Corps
- Lt. Henry Lionel Granville Burlton, Royal Field Artillery
- Lt. Hugh Henry Burn, Coldstream Guards
- Temp. 2nd Lt. Edward Burney, Intelligence Corps
- Capt. Walter Egerton George Lucian, Viscount Bury, Scots Guards
- Temp. Capt. William Harold Butler, Royal Army Medical Corps
- Capt. Bernard Maurice Gardner Butterworth, Royal Garrison Artillery
- Temp. 2nd Lt. Charles Henry Calvert, Royal Artillery
- 2nd Lt. John William Ronald Campbell, Worcestershire Regiment
- 2nd Lt. Ronald Carlisle, Welsh Horse Yeomanry
- Temp. Capt. Graham Carr, Motor Machine Gun Service
- 2nd Lt. Harry William Carritt, Northamptonshire Regiment
- Lt. Eric Carus-Wilson, Royal Engineers
- Capt. John Newman Cash, Royal Engineers
- Capt. Cyril Francis Cattley, East Kent Regiment
- Rev. Charles Egerton Chadwick MA, Army Chaplains' Department
- Capt. Norman Bairstow Chaffers, West Riding Regiment
- Temp. Capt. Robert Challoner, Loyal North Lancashire Regiment
- Capt. Noel Richard Lucas Chance, Royal Field Artillery
- 2nd Lt. Anthony James Bagot Chester, Indian Army
- 2nd Lt. Arthur Henry Talbot Chetwynd, Derby Yeomanry
- Capt. Thomas Ford Chipp, Middlesex Regiment
- Capt. John Eric Chippindall, Royal Engineers
- Lt. Lord George Hugo Cholmondeley, Nottinghamshire Battery, Royal Horse Artillery
- Capt. Malcolm Grahame Christie, Royal Flying Corps
- 2nd Lt. Charles Clark, Royal Artillery
- Temp. Capt. Charles Willoughby Clark, Motor Machine Gun Service
- Temp. Capt. Hubert William Clarke, Royal Monmouthshire Royal Engineers
- Temp. Lt. Robert Hunter Clarkson, Royal Artillery
- Capt. Robert Clough, West Yorkshire Regiment
- 2nd Lt. John Middleton Clyne, 17th Battalion, London Regiment
- Capt. Cecil Percy Coates, Royal Monmouthshire Royal Engineers
- Sgt.-Maj. Benjamin Collard, Welsh Regiment
- Temp. 2nd Lt. Charles Ellis Merriam Coubrough, West Riding Regiment
- Capt. Alfred Evelyn Coningham, Royal Engineers
- Qtr.-Mst. and Hon. Maj. Michael Henry Connery, Manchester Regiment
- Temp. 2nd Lt. Edward Denis Conran, Royal Munster Fusiliers
- Capt. John Josias Conybeare, late Oxfordshire and Buckinghamshire Light Infantry
- Temp. 2nd Lt. Reginald Charles Cooke, Welsh Regiment
- Temp. 2nd Lt. William Vernon Cook, Gloucestershire Regiment
- Sgt.-Maj. Walter John Cook, Coldstream Guards
- Lt. James Percy Carre Cooper, Royal Flying Corps
- Temp. Lt. Isaac Whitla Corkey MB, Royal Army Medical Corps
- 2nd Lt. Noel Robert Charles Cosby, Indian Army
- Capt. Harold John Couchman, Royal Engineers
- Qtr.-Mst. and Hon Lt. Frederick Cox, Lancashire Fusiliers
- Lt. Eustace Richard Alan Calthrop Cox, Devonshire Regiment
- Capt. Hugh Courtenay, Bedfordshire Regiment
- Rev. Herbert Butler Cowl, Army Chaplains' Department
- Lt. Hugh Crail, Army Service Corps
- Temp. Lt. Harry William Hay Creasy, Essex Regiment
- Capt. John Durnford Crosthwaite, 1/1st Battalion, London Regiment
- Lt. Robert Danson Cunningham, Liverpool Regiment
- 2nd Lt. Robert Cocks Cunningham, Royal Highlanders
- Sgt.-Maj. James Theodore le Page Cuthbertson, Royal Anglesey Royal Engineers
- Lt. Albert Edward Harry Meyer Archibald, Lord Dalmeny, Grenadier Guards
- Capt. Denis Daly, Royal Artillery
- 2nd Lt. George Murray Dammers, Dorset Yeomanry
- 2nd Lt. Alexander Gifford Davidson, Liverpool Regiment
- Temp. Capt. Arthur Mostyn Davies, Special List
- Temp. Capt. Edward Theophilus Davis, Army Cyclist Corps
- Capt. John Nathael de la Perrelle, Royal Fusiliers
- Capt. Joseph Leslie Dent DSO, South Staffordshire Regiment
- Temp. Lt. Robert George de Quetteville, Yorkshire Regiment
- Temp. Lt. Harold Ernest Dewar, Cheshire Regiment
- Jemadar Dhanlal Gurung, 1/5th Gurkha Rifles, Indian Army
- Lt. John Herbert Dickinson, South Lancashire Regiment
- Capt. Wadham Heathcote Diggle, Grenadier Guards
- Capt. William Robert Douglas MB, Royal Army Medical Corps
- Temp. Lt. Adolphe Drey, Army Service Corps
- Capt. Kenneth Kirkpatrick Drury MB, Royal Army Medical Corps
- Capt. Guy Rattray Dubs, King's Royal Rifle Corps
- Temp. Capt. Christopher Robson Dudgeon, Royal Army Medical Corps
- Capt. James Gordon Dugdale DSO, Staff
- Capt. Henry John Duncan, Liverpool Regiment
- Temp. Lt. John Gordon Dutton, Royal Field Artillery
- Regt. Q.M.S. Patrick Henry Dwane, Lincolnshire Regiment
- Capt. George Eldridge Dyas, Royal Army Medical Corps
- Capt. Sir John Swinnerton Dyer Bt, Scots Guards
- 2nd Lt. Sidney Edwin Earnshaw, Royal Field Artillery, Territorial Force
- 2nd Lt. John Dennison Eccles, 9th Battalion, London Regiment
- Temp. Capt. Alfred Cecil Edwards MB, Royal Army Medical Corps
- Temp. Lt. Donald William Edwards, Army Service Corps
- Temp. Lt. Owen Macaulay Eicke, Royal Field Artillery
- 2nd Lt. Russell George Elliott, York and Lancaster Regiment
- Capt. Joseph Vernon Jenner Ellis, Royal Artillery
- Temp. Lt. Richard England, Suffolk Regiment
- Temp. 2nd Lt. Ivor Thomas Evans, South Wales Borderers
- Lt. James John Pugh Evans, Welsh Guards
- Capt. Thomas John Carey Evans FRCS, Indian Medical Service
- The Rev. William Ewing MA, Army Chaplains' Department
- 2nd Lt. John Benbow Faber, Royal Engineers
- Lt. Eric Gerard Fanning, Bedfordshire Regiment
- Capt. Edward Lionel Farley, Royal Engineers
- Capt. Cyril Farmer, Royal Garrison Artillery
- Capt. Jacob Frederick Farrow, Royal Army Medical Corps
- Capt. Richard Alexander Fawcett, West Yorkshire Regiment
- Temp. Lt. Basil Ziani de Ferranti, Royal Garrison Artillery
- Temp. Lt. James Lloyd Findlay, East Surrey Regiment
- 2nd Lt. William Morton Buller Feilden, Derby Yeomanry
- Sgt.-Maj. Michael Flavin, Welsh Regiment
- Temp. Lt. George Douglas Alexander Fletcher, Highland Light Infantry
- Capt. Gordon Flemming, Gordon Highlanders
- Temp. Lt. Maxwell Hunter Forsyth, Gordon Highlanders
- Qtr.-Mst. and Hon. Capt. William Fowler, Royal Highlanders
- 2nd Lt. Harry Franklin, Manchester Regiment
- Capt. Harold Edmund Franklyn, Yorkshire Regiment
- Temp. Capt. Simon Keith Fraser, Seaforth Highlanders
- Capt. Alexander Donald Fraser MB, Royal Army Medical Corps
- Temp. Capt. Thomas Frederick, Norfolk Regiment
- Capt. Reginald Charles Freer, Royal Field Artillery
- Capt. William Henry Fry, Royal Garrison Artillery
- Lt. Francis Periam Fuller-Acland-Hood, Coldstream Guards
- 2nd Lt. Albert Furley, Gloucestershire Regiment
- Capt. Edward Keith Byrne Furze, Royal West Surrey Regiment
- 2nd Lt. John Fyfe, Scottish Rifles
- Temp. Lt. Charles Thomas Galbraith MB, Royal Army Medical Corps
- Capt. Lawrence Gall, 25th Cavalry, Indian Army
- Capt. Michael Denman Gambier-Parry, Royal Welsh Fusiliers
- The Rev. Ernest Arthur Gardner, Army Chaplains' Department
- Staff Sgt.-Maj. Cecil Garside, Army Service Corps
- Lt. Alfred Joseph Gatt, Royal Malta Artillery
- 2nd Lt. Herbert Valentine Geary, 69th Punjabis
- Capt. Kenneth Francis Drake Gattie, Monmouthshire Regiment
- Temp. Capt. Cyril Gentry-Birch, Royal Berkshire Regiment
- 2nd Lt. Charles Osborne Provis Gibson, Northumberland Fusiliers
- Temp. Capt. Harry Gilbert, York and Lancaster Regiment
- Rev. Henry Vincent Gill, Army Chaplains' Department
- Lt. William Gillespie, Argyll and Sutherland Highlanders
- Capt. John Gilmour MB FRCS, Royal Army Medical Corps
- Temp. Capt. George Bruce Gilroy, Royal Highlanders
- Temp. 2nd Lt. Arthur Louis Phillip Girdler, Royal Fusiliers
- Temp. 2nd Lt. Albert Gittins, Shropshire Light Infantry
- Capt. Reginald George Stanier Gordon, Dorset Yeo
- Lt. Edward John Grinling, Lincolnshire Regiment
- Lt. Reginald Thomas B. Glasspool, Durham Light Infantry
- Temp. Capt. Archibald Glen, Royal Anglesey Royal Engineers
- Capt. Alfred Reade Godwin-Austen, South Wales Borderers
- Lt. William Golding, Royal Field Artillery
- Capt. Henry Wetherall Goldney, Royal Garrison Artillery
- 2nd Lt. St. Barbe Goldsmith, Devonshire Regiment
- 2nd Lt. George Leonard Goodes, 4th Battalion, London Regiment
- 2nd Lt. Frank Edward Goodrich, Royal Flying Corps
- Capt. Percival James Gout, 94th Russell's Infantry, Indian Army
- 2nd Lt. Arthur Ernest Gould, Royal Engineers
- Capt. Stephen Gordon, Indian Medical Service
- Temp. Lt. Frank Newbery Gossling, Postal Service, Royal Engineers
- Temp. 2nd Lt. Clarence Edward Victor Graham, Royal Artillery
- Capt. George Reginald Grant MB, Royal Army Medical Corps
- Temp. 2nd Lt. Alexander Allen Gray, Durham Light Infantry
- Temp. Capt. Gabriel Green, Essex Regiment
- Capt. Charles James Salkeld Green, 7th Battalion, London Regiment
- 2nd Lt. Leysters Llewellyn Greener, Royal Warwickshire Regiment
- 2nd Lt. John Blackwood Greenshields, Royal Scots
- Capt. Victor John Greenwood, 10th Hussars
- Lt. Guy Saxon Llewellyn Gregson-Ellis, Royal Berkshire Regiment
- Capt. Frank Baker Gresham, Army Veterinary Corps
- Temp. Capt. Ernest Richard Gordon Greville, Royal Army Medical Corps
- Temp. Lt. Charles Grice Grice-Hutchison, South Staffordshire Regiment
- Lt. George Wilfred Grossmith, Leicestershire Regiment
- Temp. Capt. Thomas Edwin Gullick, Army Service Corps
- Temp. Lt. Francis Donald Gurrey, Royal Engineers
- Lt. Robert Henry Hadow, Argyll and Sutherland Highlanders
- Temp. Lt. Peyton Sheldon Hadley, Northamptonshire Regiment
- Temp. 2nd Lt. Clarence Espeut Lyon Hall, South Wales Borderers
- Lt. Philip Hamond DSO, Motor Machine Gun Service
- 2nd Lt. Malcolm Ernest Hancock, Northamptonshire Regiment
- 2nd Lt. (temp. Capt. Royal Engineers) Harry Hannay, King's Own Scottish Borderers
- Capt. Frank Stephen Hanson, Royal Warwickshire Regiment
- Capt. Patrick Robert Hardinge, Scottish Rifles
- 2nd Lt. James Lonsdale Harris, Royal Engineers
- Lt. William Lawson Harris, Royal Scots Fusiliers
- 2nd Lt. George Pickup Hartley. Royal Field Artillery
- Temp. Lt. Leslie Morison Harvey, Royal Field Artillery
- 2nd Lt. George Henry Havelock-Sutton, 1st King Edward's Horse
- Lt. Tyrrel Mann Hawker, Royal Field Artillery
- Qtr.-Mst. and Hon Lt. Victor Thomas Alexander Hayden, Dorsetshire Regiment
- Lt. Sidney John Heath, East Lancashire Regiment
- Temp. 2nd Lt. Martin Arthur Heathcote, Royal Fusiliers
- Lt. Henry Eric Hebbert, Royal Engineers
- 2nd Lt. William Herbert Hedges, Royal Engineers
- Capt. Albert Norman Henderson, Royal Warwickshire Regiment
- 2nd Lt. Lionel Denham Henderson, Seaforth Highlanders
- 2nd Lt. Arthur Montagu Hepworth, Royal West Surrey Regiment
- 2nd Lt. Justin Howard Herring, Royal Flying Corps
- Rev. John Hessenauer, Army Chaplains' Department
- Temp. Capt. Walter Philip Hewetson, Royal Berkshire Regiment
- Temp. 2nd Lt. James Edmund Hibbert, South Lancashire Regiment
- Capt. Lancelot Daryl Hickes, Royal Artillery
- Capt. William Thompson Highet, Royal Field Artillery
- Lt. Edward Lawrence Higgins, 1/1st London Regiment
- Capt. Laurence Hugh Higgon, Royal Garrison Artillery
- Temp. Lt. Victor Cadifor Hilditch, Royal Field Artillery
- Capt. Jacobus Darrell Hill, Scottish Rifles
- Lt. Murray Victor Burrow Hill, Royal Fusiliers
- Lt. Richard Hilton, Royal Artillery
- Capt. (temp. Maj.) Lawrence Arthur Hind, Nottinghamshire and Derbyshire Regiment
- Temp. Lt. John Hislop, Bedfordshire Regiment
- Capt. Edward Norman Fortescue Hitchins, West Riding Regiment
- Lt. Evelyn Hobson, Royal Anglesey Royal Engineers
- Lt. Edward Holland, Worcestershire Yeomanry
- Lt. William Honey, Royal Garrison Artillery
- Temp. Qtr.-Mst. and Hon Lt. Charles Kittmer Honeywill, Royal Engineers
- Temp. 2nd Lt. John Hornby, South Lancashire Regiment
- 2nd Lt. Edward Horsfall, Manchester Regiment
- Temp. Capt. Frederick Elliott Hotblack, Intelligence Corps
- Qtr.-Mst. and Hon Lt. Charles Frederick Houston, Royal Army Medical Corps
- Temp. Capt. John Alderney Howell, Cheshire Regiment
- Temp. Lt. John Baldwin Hoyle, South Lancashire Regiment
- Capt. Thomas O'Brien Hubbard, Royal Flying Corps
- Temp. Capt. Herbert Henry Hudson, West Yorkshire Regiment
- Capt. Charles Frederic Watson Hughes, 15th Sikhs, Indian Army
- Capt. Edward William Hughes, 6th Battalion, London Regiment
- Capt. Ernest Adolph Humphries, Worcestershire Regiment
- Temp. Capt. Edgar Lafayette Hunter, Northamptonshire Regiment
- Temp. Capt. Andrew Guy Hutcheson, Scottish Rifles
- 2nd Lt. Lawrence George David Hutchison, Liverpool Regiment
- Lt. Harold Alfred Ivatt, South Staffordshire Regiment
- Capt. Alan Izat, Royal Engineers
- Capt. Archibald Hardie Knowles Jackson, Royal Warwickshire Regiment
- Temp. Capt. Thomas Leslie Jackson, Cheshire Regiment
- 2nd Lt. (temp. Lt. Royal Engineers) William Francis Jackson, Royal Engineers
- Temp. Capt. Percy Lewis Jackson, Machine-gun Corps
- Temp. Lt. John Barclay Jaques, Durham Light Infantry
- Temp. 2nd Lt. Dmitri Jarintzoff, East Lancashire Regiment
- 2nd Lt. Sydney Ralph Jenkins, Royal Engineers
- Capt. Leoline Jenkins, Royal Garrison Artillery, and Royal Flying Corps
- Temp. Capt. Harold Johnson, Liverpool Regiment
- Sgt.-Maj. (now 2nd Lt) Ernest Johnson, Leicestershire Regiment
- Temp. 2nd Lt. Robert Graham Johnston, Seaforth Highlanders
- Lt. Hugh Liddon Johnston, 1/5th Battalion, London Regiment
- Temp. Capt. Arthur Cotton Jones, Lincolnshire Regiment
- Qtr.-Mst. and Hon. Capt. Thomas Albert Jones, Royal Sussex Regiment
- 2nd Lt. Leslie Tiel Jordan, Royal Engineers
- Lt. Ralph Juckes, Royal Engineers
- Capt. Edward Cotton Jury, 18th Hussars
- Temp. Capt. Arthur Corrie Keep MD, Royal Army Medical Corps
- Sgt.-Maj. Fred Cliffe Keightley, Lincolnshire Regiment
- 2nd Lt. John Philip Kellett, 2nd Battalion, London Regiment
- Lt. Robert Harold Alexander Kellie, Royal Garrison Artillery
- Rev. James Maurus Kelly, Army Chaplains' Department
- Lt. Thomas Aloysius Kelly, 24th Battalion, London Regiment
- Lt. Hugh Ainsworth Kelsall, Army Service Corps
- Temp. Lt. Frederick Hawke Kemp, Postal Section, Royal Engineers
- Capt. Martin Kemp-Welch, Royal West Surrey Regiment
- Temp. Capt. Alexander John Kendrew MB, Royal Army Medical Corps
- 2nd Lt. Philip Percy Kenyon-Slaney, Royal North Devon Yeomanry
- The Rev. Edwin Thomas Kerby MA, Army Chaplains' Department
- Capt. Edward Rigby Kewley, Rifle Brigade
- 2nd Lt. Gilbert Kilner, Suffolk Regiment, Territorial Force
- 2nd Lt. Miles Henry King, West Riding Regiment
- Capt. Andrew de Portal Kingsmill, Grenadier Guards
- Lt. Philip Kirkup, Durham Light Infantry
- Temp. Capt. Francis John Dobree Knowling, Argyll and Sutherland Highlanders
- The Rev. Frederick Farence Komlosy, Army Chaplains' Department
- Temp. 2nd Lt. Charles McMinamen Laing, Royal Scots Fusiliers
- Temp. Lt. David Ernest Laing, Royal Engineers
- Temp. Capt. Malcolm Henry Mortimer Lamb, Special List
- 2nd Lt. Du Pre Porcher Lance, Army Service Corps
- Lt. Guy de Laval Landon, Royal Field Artillery
- Temp. 2nd Lt. James Cecil Herbert Lane, Royal Field Artillery
- Lt. Arthur Gace Langley, Royal Engineers
- Capt. Arthur Wynton Langley, Royal Garrison Artillery
- 2nd Lt. Frederick Oswald Langley, South Staffordshire Regiment
- Temp. 2nd Lt. Henry Clinton Laslett, Royal Field Artillery
- Capt. Ronald John Ranulph Leacroft, Somerset Light Infantry
- Lt. Hugh Henry Lean, Highland Light Infantry
- Lt. Leonard Wright Learmount, Royal Flying Corps
- Temp. Capt. Charles Barclay Leathem, King's Own Yorkshire Light Infantry
- 2nd Lt. George James Leathem, Middlesex Regiment
- 2nd Lt. Alec Wilfred Lee, South Staffordshire Regiment
- The Rev. Edmund Legros, Army Chaplains' Department
- 2nd Lt. Walter Alexander Leith, Northumberland Hussars
- Lt. John Leslie, 12th Lancers
- Capt. Robert Burton Leslie, Lincolnshire Regiment
- Lt. Reginald Lewis, Royal Berkshire Regiment
- Temp. Lt. Ben Lightfoot, General List
- Temp. Lt. Gordon Lindley, East Kent Regiment
- 2nd Lt. Robert Chaloner Lindsey-Brabazon, Welsh Regiment
- Capt. Christopher George Ling, Royal Engineers
- Lt. William Bradshaw Litherland, Nottinghamshire and Derbyshire Regiment
- 2nd Lt. David Gane Little, Worcestershire Regiment
- Temp. 2nd Lt. Brian Llewellyn, Royal Engineers
- Lt. Leslie Shipp Lloyd, 18th Hussars
- Lt. William Loftus, Royal Scots
- Temp. Lt. John Longbourne, Royal Field Artillery
- Temp. 2nd Lt. Thomas Wilkes Lonsdale, Duke of Cornwall's Light Infantry
- Capt. Clement Lovell MD, Royal Army Medical Corps
- Capt. Henry Charles Lowry-Corry, Royal Field Artillery
- Capt. John George Lowther, 11th Hussars
- 2nd Lt. Victor Carrington Lucas, Royal Field Artillery
- Temp. Capt. Malcolm Angus MacDonald MB, Royal Army Medical Corps
- Temp. Lt. Donald McCallum, Special List
- Temp. Lt. John Sangster McCallam MD, Royal Army Medical Corps
- Capt. Frank Alexander McCammon MB, Royal Army Medical Corps
- Capt. John Dillon MacCormack, Royal Army Medical Corps
- Lt. Robert McCreary, Royal Engineers
- Lt. Basil Charles McEwen, Royal Flying Corps
- Temp. Lt. Peter McGibbon MB, Royal Army Medical Corps
- 2nd Lt. Amyas MacGregor, Royal Engineers
- 2nd Lt. Alexander Cameron Mclntyre, Argyll and Sutherland Highlanders
- 2nd Lt. James Alastair Culbard Mackay, Seaforth Highlanders
- Capt. Walter John Easton McKenzie, Army Veterinary Corps
- Capt. Thomas Gordon Mackenzie, King's Own Yorkshire Light Infantry
- Lt. William Drummond Mackintosh, Royal Engineers
- Temp. Qrmr. and Hon Lt. John McLundie, Army Service Corps
- Capt. Willie McMaster, Royal Field Artillery
- Lt. Hugh Arthur McMullen, Royal Irish Fusiliers
- Capt. Alan Gordon McNeill, Royal Engineers
- Lt. Hugh John Macnamara, Royal Engineers
- 2nd Lt. Philip Albert Charles Maginn, 18th Battalion, London Regiment
- Lt. John Wilfrid Douglas Mallins, Royal Engineers
- Temp. Capt. Alexander William Ray Mallinson, Army Service Corps
- Temp. Lt. Stuart Sidney Mallinson, Army Service Corps
- Temp. Capt. Harry Ainsley Mann, Postal Section, Royal Engineers
- Capt. Alan Frederick Marchment, 1/1st London Regiment
- Hon. Capt. Edwin Charles Marfleet, Army Ordnance Depot
- Lt. Philip Reginald Margetson, Royal Scots Fusiliers
- Lt. John Charles Oakes Marriott, Northamptonshire Regiment
- Capt. John Rudolph Marry, Royal Engineers
- Lt. Stephen Gilbert Bowyer Marsh, Royal Field Artillery
- Lt. Phillip Everard Graham Marsh, Army Service Corps
- Capt. Charles Frederick Kelk Marshall, Royal Field Artillery
- Lt. Alfred Russel Marshall, Royal Engineers
- Staff Sgt.-Maj. Samuel Martin, Army Pay Corps
- Lt. William Charles Maskell, Royal Field Artillery
- Temp. Capt. Charles Lyall Mason, Royal Engineers
- Capt. Hugh Royds Stokes Massy, Royal Artillery
- Temp. Lt. Ernest Matthews, Royal Engineers
- Temp. Lt. Ronald Vincent Maudslay, Royal Field Artillery
- Temp. Lt. John Kindersley Maurice, Army Service Corps
- Temp. Capt. John Maxwell, Rifle Brigade
- Lt. Power MacMurrough Maxwell, Royal Artillery
- 2nd Lt. Henry William Mends May, Hampshire Regiment
- 2nd Lt. William Ernest Hopkins Metcalfe, Royal Field Artillery
- 2nd Lt. Booker Milburri, Hertfordshire Regiment
- Capt. Herbert Stewart Milne MD, Royal Army Medical Corps
- Temp. Lt. Ernest Charles Temple Minet, Royal Fusiliers
- Capt. Cuthbert Elliott Montgomery, Army Service Corps
- Capt. Alfred Garnet Moore, Manchester Regiment, attached to Royal Flying Corps
- Capt. Harold Edward Moore, Royal Monmouthshire Royal Engineers
- Temp. Capt. Humphrey Bateman Moore, Rifle Brigade
- 2nd Lt. John Rushton Moore, Cheshire Regiment
- Temp. Capt. Harold Mead Moore, Army Service Corps
- Lt. Bruce Samuel Kirkman Guise Moores, Royal Garrison Artillery
- Sgt.-Maj. James Thomas Moraghan, Connaught Rangers
- Lt. John Wayne Morgan, Royal Engineers
- Qtr.-Mst. and Hon. Capt. William Albert Morris, Royal Inniskilling Fusiliers
- Temp. Lt. Frederick Oscar Morris, Intelligence Corps
- Lt. Desmond John Falkiner Morton, Royal Field Artillery
- Sgt.-Maj. Harry Morton, Nottinghamshire and Derbyshire Regiment
- 2nd Lt. Hugh Fenwick Mott, 16th Battalion, London Regiment
- Lt. James Bernard Mowat, Royal Engineers
- 2nd Lt. Stanley Mugford, 1st Scottish Horse Yeomanry
- 2nd Lt. James Ingram Muirhead, King's Own Yorkshire Light Infantry
- Lt. (temp. Capt. Royal Engineers) John Spencer Muirhead
- Lt. Frank Richard Mumford, Wiltshire Regiment
- Sgt.-Maj. Thomas Murden, East Surrey Regiment
- Capt. Cyril Francis de Sales Murphy, Royal Berkshire Regiment and Royal Flying Corps
- 2nd Lt. Henry Stoney Netherwood, West Riding Regiment
- Lt. (temp. Capt) Alfred Geoffrey Neville, Royal Horse Artillery
- Qtr.-Mst. and Hon Lt. Robert Patrick Neville, Northumberland Fusiliers
- Temp. Lt. James Wilfrid Trevor Newbery, Royal Field Artillery
- 2nd Lt. Arthur Newman, Essex Regiment
- Temp. Lt. Cecil Arnold Vessey Newsome, Durham Light Infantry
- Temp. Capt. Philip Bouverie Bowyer Nichols, Suffolk Regiment
- 2nd Lt. Humphrey Brunei Noble, Northumberland Hussars Yeomanry
- Temp. Capt. Herbert Luxton Norman, East Lancashire Regiment
- Temp. Lt. Cyril Burton North, Royal Engineers
- Temp. Capt. Walter Charles Norton, Royal Sussex Regiment
- 2nd Lt. Henry Hartley Noton, Lancashire Fusiliers
- Temp. Lt. Richard Narcissus Nunn, Royal Lancaster Regiment
- Temp. Lt. Joseph White O'Brien MB, Royal Army Medical Corps
- Lt. Arthur Cathal O'Connor, Norfolk Regiment
- Temp. Capt. John William Oldfield, General List
- Capt. Edwin Herbert O'Reilly-Blackwood, Royal Garrison Artillery
- Temp. Capt. Hugh James Orr-Ewing MB, Royal Army Medical Corps
- Lt. Walter Llewellyn Owen, Liverpool Regiment
- Capt. William Evelyn Pain, Royal Engineers
- Lt. William Henry Palmer, King's Royal Rifle Corps
- Capt. Henry Forbes Panton MB, Royal Army Medical Corps
- The Rev. Arthur Groom Parham, Army Chaplains' Department
- Capt. Adam St. John Lloyd Park, Royal Field Artillery
- Temp. 2nd Lt. Charles Enverdale Park, General List, attached to Royal Engineers
- Temp. 2nd Lt. Sidney John Parr, attached to 1st Dragoons
- Capt. Isaac Arthur James Pask, Royal Garrison Artillery
- Temp. 2nd Lt. George Hedworth Pattinson, Royal Fusiliers
- Lt. Lawrence Arthur Pattinson, Royal Fusiliers and Royal Flying Corps
- Temp. Capt. Noel Gervis Pearson, Nottinghamshire and Derbyshire Regiment
- 2nd Lt. Eric Alexander Pearson, King's Royal Rifle Corps
- The Hon. Dudley Roger Hugh Pelham, late 10th Hussars
- Lt. Hon. Sackville George Pelham, 11th Hussars
- Temp. Capt. William Arthur Trevelyan Pennant, Royal Engineers
- 2nd Lt. Geoffrey Arthur Peppercorn AMICE, Royal Engineers
- Capt. Paul Cuthbert Petrie, Royal Field Artillery
- Capt. Noel Clive Phillips, Loyal North Lancashire Regiment
- Lt. Ian Stanley Ord Playfair, Royal Engineers
- Hon. Capt. George Robert Playfair, Army Ordnance Depot
- Capt. Geoffrey Francis Plowden, Oxfordshire and Buckinghamshire Light Infantry
- Capt. Edward Albert Porch, Supply and Transport Corps, Indian Army
- Temp. 2nd Lt. Thomas William Powell, Welsh Regiment
- Capt. D'Arcy Power, Royal Army Medical Corps
- Capt. Edward Rogers Pratt, Royal Garrison Artillery
- Capt. Edward Hulton Preston, Royal Sussex Regiment
- 2nd Lt. Harold Price-Williams, Royal Field Artillery
- Lt. Geoffrey Arthur Prideaux, Somerset Light Infantry
- Capt. Humphrey Holland Prideaux, Northumberland Fusiliers
- 2nd Lt. Percy Malin Pridmore, Royal Warwickshire Regiment
- Lt. The Hon. Neil James Archibald Primrose, Buckinghamshire Yeomanry
- Lt. John George Prince, Royal Field Artillery
- 2nd Lt. George Prior, Royal Garrison Artillery
- Hon. Capt. George Herbert Pulleyn, Supply and Transport Corps, Indian Army
- Capt. Henry George Pyne, Royal Engineers
- 2nd Lt. John Haylin Quinn, Army Service Corps
- Lt. Edmund Rait-Kerr, Royal Engineers
- Capt. Geoffrey Grahame Rawson, Royal Engineers
- Temp. Lt. Charles James Johnson Reed, Royal Engineers
- Temp. Lt. John Percival Reid, Army Ordnance Depot
- Capt. Cyril Herbert Reynolds, Royal Garrison Artillery
- Lt. Roderick Thomas Herbert Reynolds, Norfolk Regiment
- Capt. Bernard Francis Rhodes, Royal Artillery
- Temp. Lt. James Ernest Richey, Royal Engineers
- Temp. Capt. George Augustus Riddell, Cheshire Regiment
- Capt. William Henry Roberts, Royal Engineers
- Lt. Oliver John Robertson, 23rd Battalion, London Regiment
- Temp. 2nd Lt. Geoffrey Robinson, Connaught Rangers
- Capt. George Edward James Antoine Robinson MD, Royal Army Medical Corps
- Temp. Capt. Richard Ivan Robson, Royal Irish Rifles
- 2nd Lt. John Blair Rodger, Scottish Horse Yeomanry
- Qtr.-Mst. and Hon Lt. Harry George Rogers, Royal West Kent Regiment
- Temp. Lt. Claude Rolo, Army Service Corps
- Capt. Alistair Richard Roney Dougal, Royal Artillery
- Temp. 2nd Lt. Edward Marshall Rosher, Special List
- 2nd Lt. Richard Ross, Devon Regiment
- Capt. James Rowbotham, Highland Light Infantry
- Temp. 2nd Lt. Richard Leggett Rowe, Royal Engineers
- Surg.-Capt. William Trethowan Rowe MD, South Nottinghamshire Hussars
- Temp. Capt. Ronald Harry Royle, Manchester Regiment
- Qtr.-Mst. and Hon Lt. George Robinson Rumsey, Wiltshire Regiment
- Temp. Lt. Oscar Julius Tolme Runge, Middlesex Regiment
- Rev William Rushby, Army Chaplains' Department
- Temp. Lt. John Clement Russell, Royal Field Artillery
- Capt. Arthur Gerald Russell, Royal Garrison Artillery
- 2nd Lt. Frank Irwin Rutherfurd, Royal Field Artillery
- Temp. Capt. Herbert Henry Sampson MB FRCS, Royal Army Medical Corps
- 2nd Lt. Clement Richard Folliott, Sandford, King's Own Yorkshire Light Infantry
- 2nd Lt. Reginald Arthur Savory, 14th Ferozepore Sikhs, Indian Army
- 2nd Lt. Humphrey Sayer, Sussex Yeomanry
- Capt. Hon Percy Gerald Scarlett, East Kent Regiment
- Lt. James Geoffrey Schon, Royal Engineers
- Lt. Ronald MacKenzie Scobie, Royal Engineers
- Capt. Andrew Holmes Scott, Royal Engineers
- Temp. Lt. Alan Dald Wyndham Scott, Royal Garrison Artillery
- 2nd Lt. Thomas Douglas Scott, Royal Engineers
- Temp. Lt. John Austin Scrutton, Royal Engineers
- Capt. Charles Westrope Selby, Royal Field Artillery
- Capt. Herbert Colin Blair Sessions, Gloucestershire Regiment
- Capt. Reginald Henry Napier Settle, 19th Hussars
- Capt. Edward Sewell, Army Veterinary Corps
- Capt. Arthur Godfrey Shaw, East Yorkshire Regiment
- Capt. Clement Ridley Shield, Highland Light Infantry
- Temp. Capt. George Cecil Shipster, Royal Fusiliers
- Capt. Lewis Rudall Shore, Royal Army Medical Corps
- Lt. Clement Maurice Simpson, Royal Engineers
- 2nd Lt. Thomas Cooper Simpson, Royal Engineers
- Capt. Esmond Moreton Sinauer, Royal Engineers
- Capt. Ernest Cowper Slade, Gloucestershire Regiment
- Lt. John Nuttall Slater, Royal Field Artillery
- Capt. Gerald Russell Smallwood, East Yorkshire Regiment
- Qtr.-Mst. and Hon Lt. William Hudson Smart, Army Service Corps
- 2nd Lt. Alec Clifton Smith, Fife and Forfar Yeomanry
- Lt. Francis Longden Smith, West Riding Regiment
- Capt. Bertram Abel Smith, Nottinghamshire Yeomanry
- Temp. Capt. Henry Smith, Royal Artillery
- Temp. Capt. Herbert George Smith, Army Service Corps
- Capt. Tom Vincent Smith, Royal Flying Corps
- Capt. Bruce Swinton Smith-Masters, Essex Regiment
- Capt. George Osbert Stirling Smyth, Royal Field Artillery
- Capt. Dryden George Thompson Sneyd, Royal Garrison Artillery
- Sgt.-Maj. Alfred Snow, Royal Engineers
- Temp. 2nd Lt. Durbin Sanderson Spark, Somerset Light Infantry
- 2nd Lt. Hubert Conrad Sparks, 14th Battalion, London Regiment
- Temp. 2nd Lt. Arthur Magnus Spence, Special List
- Capt. Wilfrid Bliss Spender, Royal Garrison Artillery
- 2nd Lt. Basil Stephenson, Royal 1st Devonshire Yeomanry
- Lt. Ian MacAlister Stewart, Argyll and Sutherland Highlanders
- Temp. Capt. Peter Stewart, Highland Light Infantry
- Capt. Walter Robert Stewart, Rifle Brigade
- Lt. Charles James Stocker MB, Indian Medical Service
- Capt. Aleyn Whitley Stokes, Royal Engineers
- Temp. Lt. James Strachan, Royal Engineers
- 2nd Lt. William Victor Strugnell, Hampshire Regiment and Royal Flying Corps
- Capt. Eric Scratton Swaine, Northumberland Fusiliers
- 2nd Lt. Francis Gibbon Swainson, 1/16th London Regiment
- Temp. Capt. Matthew Arnold Swan MB, Royal Army Medical Corps
- Lt. Francis Patrick Hamilton Synge, Irish Guards
- Rev. Edward Keble Talbot, Army Chaplains' Department
- Lt. Thomas Francis Tallents, Irish Guards
- 2nd Lt. George Walter Tanner, Leicestershire Regiment
- Temp. Capt. Douglas Compton Taylor FRCS, Royal Army Medical Corps
- 2nd Lt. Samuel Taylor, Worcestershire Regiment
- Temp. 2nd Lt. John Stewart Teare, Royal Field Artillery
- Rev. William Telfer, Army Chaplains' Department
- Capt. James Gilbert Thompson, Liverpool Regiment
- 2nd Lt. Aubrey Lloyd Sinclair Thomson, Liverpool Regiment
- Temp. Lt. Claude Ernest Thompson, South Lancashire Regiment
- 2nd Lt. Reginald Gresham Thomson, Shropshire Light Infantry
- Temp. Capt. Harry Tudor Thornley, Royal Engineers
- 2nd Lt. Thomas Edward Thorpe, Lancashire Fusiliers
- Capt. John Horace Thursfield, South Staffordshire Regiment
- Capt. Harry Frederick Otho Thwaites, Royal Engineers
- 2nd Lt. Arthur Tomlinson, Middlesex Regiment
- Temp. Lt. Harold Toulmin, Loyal North Lancashire Regiment
- Capt. Robert Douglas Greaves Townend, Army Service Corps
- Capt. William Samuel Trail, 57th Wilde's Rifles
- Lt. Charles James Traill, Seaforth Highlanders
- Lt. Rupert Patrick le Poer Trench, Grenadier Guards
- Capt. Reginald Aubrey Turner, Royal Engineers
- Temp. 2nd Lt. Richard Turner, Royal Dublin Fusiliers
- Temp. Lt. Frederick Harry Turner, Gloucestershire Regiment
- Temp. Lt. Herbert William Henry Tyler, Leicestershire Regiment
- Lt. Hesperus Andrias van Ryneveld, Royal Flying Corps
- Capt. Charles John Wycliff Vasey, Royal Engineers
- Lt. John Lyndhurst Vaughan, East Surrey Regiment
- Capt. Harry Wilson Verelst, Coldstream Guards
- Lt. Arthur Birley Patrick Love Vincent, 3rd Dragoon Guards
- Capt. Philip Henry Norris Nugent Vyvyan, Army Service Corps
- Temp. Capt. John Alexander Walbcoffe-Wilson, Middlesex Regiment
- Capt. Robert Hugh Wade-Gery, Royal Garrison Artillery
- Lt. Owen Murton Wales, South Wales Borderers
- Lt. Michael Wallington, Royal Sussex Regiment
- Temp. Lt. Guy Herbert Walmisley, Royal Engineers
- Capt. Charles Herbert Walsh, Connaught Rangers, 32nd Divisional Signal Company
- 2nd Lt. Leonard Exell Walsh, Army Service Corps
- Temp. 2nd Lt. Frederick Vivian Ward-Jones, South Wales Borderers
- Temp. 2nd Lt. Robert Warnock, Royal Scots Fusiliers
- 2nd Lt. John Russell Warren, Royal Engineers
- Capt. George Edmund Borlase Watson, Royal Field Artillery
- Temp. Qtr.-Mst. and Hon Lt. John Traill Watson, Royal Engineers
- 2nd Lt. William Charles Gumming Weetman, Nottinghamshire and Derbyshire Regiment
- Capt. Lord George Wellesley, Grenadier Guards and Royal Flying Corps
- 2nd Lt. Gerald Valerian Wellesley, Oxfordshire Hussars
- Capfc. Francis Edward Wenger, North Staffordshire Regiment
- Capt. Charles Francis Russell Nugent Weston AMICE, Royal Engineers
- Temp. Capt. Sidney Albert Westrop, Motor Machine Gun Service
- Lt. Christopher Probart Whitaker, Dorsetshire Regiment
- Sgt.-Maj. Charles Henry Whitcombe, Royal Field Artillery
- Qtr.-Mst. and Hon Lt. Ernest O'Brien White, Border Regiment
- Temp. Capt. George White, Durham Light Infantry
- 2nd Lt. Geoffrey Ernest Whitfield, Hertfordshire Regiment
- 2nd Lt. Norman Henry Pownall Whitley, Manchester Regiment
- Temp. Lt. Noel Stewart Whitton MB, Royal Army Medical Corps
- 2nd Lt. Robert Baldwin Whitworth, Royal Field Artillery
- Lt. Edward Whur, Essex Regiment
- Capt. John Oldknow Widdows, North Lancashire Regiment
- 2nd Lt. Frederick Joseph Wilde, Army Service Corps
- Capt. Harry Findlater Wilkin FRCS, Royal Army Medical Corps
- Lt. James Fischer Wilkinson, Royal Field Artillery
- 2nd Lt. George Edward Wilkinson, Northumberland Fusiliers
- 2nd Lt. William George Bransby Williams, Royal Flying Corps
- Lt. Guy Williams, London Regiment
- 2nd Lt. Graham Billingsby Williams, Leicestershire Regiment
- Temp. Lt. James Williams, Army Service Corps
- Temp. Capt. Orlando Cyprian Williams, Special List
- Temp. Capt. William Renfrew Wilson, Royal Engineers
- Capt. Denis Daly Wilson, 17th Cavalry, Indian Army
- Temp. 2nd Lt. Frank Wisher, Royal Field Artillery
- Capt. William Allsop Wistance, South Staffordshire Regiment
- Capt. Thomas Stafford Wollocombe, Middlesex Regiment
- Temp. Capt. Edgar William Wood, South Staffordshire Regiment
- Rev. Claude Thomas Thellusson Wood, Army Chaplains' Department
- Capt. Austin Hale Woodbridge, Middlesex Regiment
- Lt. William Talbot Woods, Manchester Regiment
- Capt. Frank Rupert Woollcombe, Royal Garrison Artillery
- 2nd Lt. Sidney John Worsley, North Staffordshire Regiment
- Temp. 2nd Lt. Percy Worthington, Middlesex Regiment
- 2nd Lt. Alexander Allen Wright, Royal Lancaster Regiment
- 2nd Lt. James Percy Wright, Royal Artillery
- Temp. Capt. William Wright, King's Own Scottish Borderers
- Temp. Lt. Charles Walter Glade Wright, Somerset Light Infantry
- Temp. Capt. Frank John Sadler Wyeth, Essex Regiment
- Lt. Victor Llewellyn Young, Gloucestershire Regiment
- 2nd Lt. Walter Dillon Zeller, Royal Engineers

Australian Imperial Force

- Capt. and Qtr.-Mst. Alexander Elijah Clarke, Army Medical Corps
- Capt. Hoy Victor Cutler, Australian Engineers
- Capt. William James Macavoy Locke, 13th Battalion
- Rev. William McKenzie, Army Chaplains' Department
- Capt. Francis Thornthwaite, Field Artillery
- Capt. Arthur Andrew White, 1st Light Horse Regiment
- Qtr.-Mst. and Hon Lt. Edmond Tudor Boddam, Army Medical Corps
- Lt. John Heathcote Newmarch, Field Artillery
- Lt. Inglis Peter Stewart, 22nd Battalion
- 2nd Lt. John Lyall Smith, 25th Battalion

Canadian Force

- Capt. Allan de Vere Connors, 10th Infantry Battalion
- Capt. Harold William Alexander Foster, 20th Infantry Battalion
- Capt. Gwynne Ivor Gwynn, 29th Infantry Battalion
- Capt. Patterson Lindsay Hall, 24th Infantry Battalion
- Capt. George Edward Kidd, Army Medical Corps
- Capt. Edwin Russell Leather, Canadian Field Artillery
- Capt. Frederick William Miller, 4th Infantry Battalion
- Capt. Georges-Philéas Vanier, 22nd Infantry Battalion
- Capt. William Basil Wedd, 3rd Infantry Battalion
- Hon. Capt. Rev. Wolstan Thomas Workman, Army Chaplain's Department
- Lt. George Cecil Carvell, Princess Patricia's Canadian Light Infantry
- Lt. Murdock Neil McPhee, Canadian Engineers

Newfoundland Contingent

- Capt. Adolph Ernest Bernard, 1st Newfoundland Regiment

New Zealand Imperial Force

- Capt. George Henry Holland, Auckland Battalion
- Capt. James Macdonald Richmond, N.Z. Artillery
- 2nd Lt. William Houkamau Stainton, Māori Contingent

=== Royal Red Cross (RRC) ===
==== Royal Red Cross, 1st Class ====
Queen Alexandra's Imperial Military Nursing Service

- L. Belcher
- S. K. Bills
- M. M. Bond
- H. Burton
- A. B. Cameron
- J. M. Clay (retired list)
- M. E. Davies
- J. E. Dods
- H. M. Drage
- F. Epton
- C. M. Gambardella
- E. W. Gray
- M. E.M. Grierson
- M. E. Howell
- I. D. Humfrey
- S. Lamming
- G. E. Larner (retired list)
- I. Lovett
- M. F. McCord
- E. C. McGill
- M. E. Medforth
- D. M.C. Michell
- H. G. Millar
- M. E. Neville
- J. Orr
- F. N. Roberts
- S. Smyth
- M. F. Steele (retired list)
- L. E.G. Steen
- H. Suart
- C. L. Warrack (India)
- H. Whiteford
- A. Willes
- I. G. Willetts
- A. J. Williams
- M. B. Williams
- A. L. Wilson

Territorial Force Nursing Service

- E. C. Barton
- M. A. Brown
- H. M. Cottam
- L. G. Dalton
- E. E. Darbyshire
- A. H. Kerr
- K. G. Lloyd
- E. M. Newton
- E. N. Northover
- M. Pinsent
- J. Purves
- M. S. Rundle
- M. Sinclair
- E. Smale
- I. Turner

Australian Army Nursing Service

- E. A. Conyers
- E. Gray
- J. McHardie White
- J. McWhite

Canadian Nursing Service

- M. O. Boulter, Matron (Assistant Matron-in-Chief)
- E. M. Charleson
- A. C. Strong
- B. J. Willoughby
- E. M. Wilson

New Zealand Nursing Service

- M. M. Cameron
- A. Tombe

American Nursing Service

- M. I. Patten

Nursing Staff of Military and War Hospitals

- E. L. Flangan
- M. Macrae

Nursing Staff of Civil Hospitals

- E. Barry
- M. F. Bostock

Civil Hospitals Reserve

- C. Todd

British Red Cross Society

- Lady Ethel Lucy Perrott DStJ

==== Royal Red Cross, 2nd Class ====
Queen Alexandra's Imperial Military Nursing Service

- L. Abbott
- M. E. Alexander
- E. Allee
- M. Allibone
- A. E. Andrew
- J. F. Andrews
- H. M. Ankers
- D. A. Ansell
- S. Archer
- N. Atkinson
- I. J. Baddeley
- E. B. Bagnall
- C, K. Baillie
- E. Baldwin
- M. Barker
- M. Barnes
- M. C. Barns
- M. H. Barrett
- M. E.O. Barrow
- E. Beaton
- A. Beaumont
- E. A. Bell
- E. G. Bennett
- E. E. Bennett
- I. Berry
- K. L. Bigg
- F. M. Biggar
- A. Bignell
- F. L. Billerby
- C. Black
- A. Blamire
- C. E. Bobents
- A. Boddy
- E. Bolland
- E. M. Bond
- M. Boswell
- C. J. Boulter
- E. M. Bowes
- E. K. Bracher
- M. Bradburn
- C. M. Brand
- E. Brander
- C. E. Bray
- M. Brebner
- A. Breese
- K. Brindley
- H. Brocklehurst
- R. E. Brunskill
- E. K. Bryant
- W. Bryne
- A. Bull
- F. Burns
- I. Calder
- C. M. Callum
- C. Cameron
- E. M. Cammack
- C. Campbell
- A. M. Carter
- M. Carter
- D. F. Chapman
- E. M. Charles
- E. C. Claney
- M. D. Cole
- G. M. Collins
- B. Coltman
- E. E. Connell
- M. Connell
- A. Cookran
- M. B. Cooksley
- M. M.W. Cooze
- E. Copper
- D. A. Creed
- E. Cubley
- J. M. Cunningham
- P. Dale
- P. Dale
- H. Darge
- E. Davis
- B. Davison
- M. Davitt
- E. A. Dawson
- K. Daye
- D. M. de Kock
- D. Deacon
- Z. Deacon
- G. V. Deakin
- C. A. DeCormier
- A. C. Dent
- I. Dickson
- T. Dickson
- G. Dingwall
- A. Dobbin
- M. Donald
- E. E. Draper
- E. Duston
- M. O. Ecles
- N. Egremont
- C. Elgin
- A. Ellis
- J. P.T. Ellis
- L. Ellis
- A. M. Ensell
- J. Entwistle
- M. Evans
- N. Evans
- K. M. Fawcett
- S. Ferguson
- M. Flynn
- M. A. Forbes
- M. Foster
- M. Foster
- M. Fox
- A. D. Frame
- N. Franckeiss
- M. A. Franklin
- J. Fraser
- O. F. Garland
- F. Geradet
- B. Gilchrist
- B. M. Gillespie
- E. Gordon
- J. Green
- C. I. Griffin
- T. Guinan
- M. H.M. Gurney
- L. Hack
- E. Hailey
- W. Halloran
- F. Hancock
- L. M. Hansford
- C. E.A. Harries
- B. Harris
- M. E. Harris
- E. E. Hart
- G. Hawkins
- J. Helps
- E. Henderson
- C. M. Hodson
- E. M. Holmes
- M. Horder
- C. E. Houlson
- A. E. Humphries
- L. Huntley
- E. Isaac
- C. Jackson
- E. K. Jackson
- E. James
- E. E. James
- E. James
- L. E. Jolly
- D. Jones
- E. Kay
- I. Kemp
- M. J. Kirkpatrick
- F. Knight
- M. K. Lambkin
- M. Laurence
- A. Leslie
- E. S. Lett
- D. R. Lewis
- J. Lindsay
- A. Linton
- E. M. Livingstone
- F. C. Lupton
- M. A. Lyons
- M. Macdevitt
- F. Macpherson
- M. B. Mann
- F. M. Marsh
- M. Martin
- F. B. Mattice
- E. L. McAllister
- M. P. McBreen
- A. H. McCall
- F. E. M. McCallum
- J. McCarthy
- J. W. McEwan
- E. McLaughlin
- A. McLean
- M. F. McLean
- R. McLean
- D. McLelland
- A. N. McLennan
- A. Mclntosh
- T. M. C. McMahon
- S. McMullan
- E. C. Mercer
- F. Meyer
- M. C.A. Michell
- C. Mitchell
- E. Mitchell
- M. Mitchell
- E. G. Moffat
- E. M. Monck-Mason
- E. H. Moore
- G. M. Moore
- G. Morgan
- A. C. Mowat
- D. F. Mudie
- M. Munn
- R. McM. Munro
- M. J. Nawn
- J. M.S. Nelson
- V. S. Newman
- O. Newstead
- E. Norman
- E. E. O'Connell
- F. Ockelford
- C. J. Oliver
- K. M. Orr
- N. Parke
- G. F. Parkinson
- C. Pearce
- E. V. Pearce
- M. Percival
- A. H. Pledger
- R. Plumtree
- M. Porteous
- M. Power
- A. M. Purcell
- M. M. Rainey
- B. Reynolds
- H. E. Reynolds
- J. Riddell
- A. B. Ritchie
- A. Robb
- E. Roberts
- K. Rogers
- A. L. Ross
- M. Ross
- K. E. M. Rossi
- D. Rothery
- G. M. K. Rowley
- E. Russell
- L. Rutter
- A. Salkind
- E. Salkind
- E. Schafer
- K. I. Seager
- F. E. Searle
- F. E. Searle
- G. H. Sellar
- C. F. Shaw
- N. L. Sibley
- E. B. G. Sim
- A. Simpson
- H. Simpson
- M. L. Sinclair
- C. M. Skeltor
- A. Smart
- G. C. Smith
- H. H. Smith
- M. A.C. Smith
- E. M. Sparks
- E. N. Spencer
- E. B. Spooner
- M. M. Staveley
- E. Stedman
- D. M. Steele
- K. Steele
- A. A. Steer
- D. Stevens
- M. E. Stewart
- J. Stronach
- A. L. Stuart
- M. Stuart
- E. C. Sutton
- E. G. Swan
- L. A. Tabor (Australia)
- G. Tait
- K. Taylor
- M. Taylor
- A. M. Teague
- E. M. Thacker
- A. Thomas
- E. Thomas
- E. J. Thomas
- F. H. Thomas
- I. Thompson
- M. B. Thomson
- S. Tiplady
- A. G. Todd
- J. C. Towell
- A. A. Tupper
- B. D. Turner
- M. Turner
- A. M. Tweedy
- C. M. L. V. P. Tyler
- C. W. Viets
- V. G. Wakeford
- F. O. Wallen
- E. Walsh
- S. Walsh
- E. Walton
- V. Wardlow
- I. B. Watson
- L. Webster
- C. F. West
- W. White
- K. F. Whittock
- J. Whyfee
- D. Wilbourne
- J. Williams
- E. Wimbush
- D. E. Winter
- F. A. Wood
- D. M.H. Woollett
- D. M. Woolmer
- E. G. Wraxall
- A. E. Wright
- A. S. Young
- C. Yule

Territorial Force Nursing Service

- J. Arthur
- G. Budman
- F. Crowder-Davis
- J. Fairgrieve
- L. Heck
- E. C. Lister
- M. L'A. Longmore
- M. E. Masterton
- C. J. Miller
- M. Mitchell
- E. Mundy
- E. J. Seaton
- J. Simpson
- M. D. Thompson
- K. Todd

Australian Army Nursing Service

- P. M. Boissier
- E. S. Davidson
- A. G. Douglas
- J. B. Johnson
- E. F. Lee-Archer
- E. M. Menhennet
- F. Nicholls
- L. C. Pratt
- T. E. Thomas

Canadian Nursing Service

- M, K. Douglas
- M. E. Gardiner
- M. M. Goodeve
- S. M. Hoerner
- C. I. Scoble

New Zealand Nursing Service

- V. McLean

South African Nursing Service

- H. L. Bestor
- G. E. Francis
- M. A. Fynn

Nursing Staff of Military and War Hospitals

- M. Allan
- D. Andre
- F. Ashworth
- E. Baldwin
- M. Bamford
- M. A. Barclay
- H. Barrett
- M. E. Bliss
- A. M. Blott
- I. Bodin
- H. A. Brew
- J. B. Bruce
- J. Burns
- E. M. Chaplin
- M. Coulson
- L. Donald
- M. Dowbiggin
- L. Dunbabin
- F. M. Edwards
- M. Hartrick
- W. Holroyd
- B. A. Hope
- C. L. Keen
- M. Kilby
- M. S. King
- C. Lawrenson
- E. M. Lewis
- M. Macken
- A. Maclaren
- E. Marks
- M. McKenna
- M. Mclntyre
- M. McLymont
- D. Milne
- E. M. O'Kelly
- M. Paddle
- H. A. Powell
- F. Price
- L. M. Reeves
- M. Richards
- M. Roberts
- C. Robinette
- L. Rogers-Smith
- S. A. Selby
- S. A. Soames
- N. Somerville
- D. Tong
- E. L. Waddington
- M. Williams

Nursing Staff of Civil Hospitals

- M. Allen
- M O. Beatley
- J. Blacoe
- A. Bowdler
- M. Buchanan
- E. Chisholm
- M. Constable (Sister Mary Angela)
- F. Coombe
- M. Curwen
- C. Doughty
- S. Edgar
- S. Elliott
- L. Farquhar
- A. G. Farrington
- E. Fisher
- L. G. Francis
- J. B. Gates
- M. J. Grant
- A. E. Harris
- R. T. Hayes
- B. Hedderman
- D. Hirst
- R. Hoff
- M. K. Ireland
- M. J. King
- A. Macdonald
- M. Marr
- A. Martin
- E. Mason
- G. Massingham
- C. McCulloch
- F. McKinnon
- L. McLean
- M. R. McLean
- M. L. Meeson
- D. Minchin
- A. Miskelly
- H. E. Moffatt
- M. A. Quartermaine
- C. P. Rintoul
- E. F. Scott
- L. G. Shields
- F. Slinger
- G. Stapleton
- J. G. Stiles
- E. G. Taylor
- M. E. Tirell
- S. B. Vulliemoz
- R. Ward

=== Distinguished Conduct Medal (DCM) ===
- Pnr. Sgt. A. G. F. Ackary, South Lancashire Regiment
- Sgt. A. Adams, Welsh Regiment
- Sgt. (Acting Company Sgt-Maj) T. Aitken, Border Regiment
- Acting Bombardier A. Allan, Royal Field Artillery
- Company Sgt-Maj M. A. Alldridge, South Lancashire Regiment
- Cpl. A. E. Allibone, Northern Regiment
- Pte. G. R. Allport, Army Service Corps
- Sgt. J. Anderson, Middlesex Regiment
- Sgt. N. E. Andrews, Dorset Yeomanry
- Sgt-Maj. J. Archibald, l/3rd Scottish Horse
- Sgt. (Acting Company Sgt-Maj.) J. Armstrong, Cheshire Field Company, Royal Engineers
- Pte. H. D. Ashley, Dorset Yeomanry
- Cpl. T. S. Askin, Royal Field Artillery
- Sgt. H. Atkin, Royal Field Artillery
- Acting Cpl. T. W. Attkins, Oxfordshire and Bucks Light Infantry
- Pte. A. Ault, Notts and Derby Regiment
- Company. Sgt-Maj. (Acting Sgt-Maj.) F. F. Bailey, London Regiment
- Company Sgt-Maj. H. Baker, Liverpool Regiment
- Pte. C. Banham, l/3rd East Anglian Field Ambulance, Royal Army Medical Corps
- Sgt. (Acting Company. Sgt-Maj.) H. Banks, West Yorkshire Regiment
- L./C. A. Barclay, Ayrshire Yeomanry
- Sgt. C. Barnes, Manchester Regiment
- Sgt. B. K. Barnes, Northumberland Fusiliers
- Cpl. E. Barnes, Bedfordshire Regiment.
- Cpl. J. Barrett, South Wales Borderers
- Sgt. W. H. Barrett, London Regiment
- Bombardier. E. Bartlett, Royal Field Artillery
- Cpl. W. Barry, Royal Fusiliers
- Pte. G. Barton, 11th Hussars
- Company. Sgt-Maj. C. J. Bastable, Royal Engineers
- Sgt. C. A. Batham, Lancashire Fusiliers
- L./Sgt. G. J, Batley, Norfolk Regiment
- Acting. Bombardier. F. Batt, Royal Field Artillery
- Pte. H. Baulcomb, Royal Army Medical Corps
- Acting Sgt-Maj. (now Quartermaster and Hon. Lt.) R. Baxter, West Riding Regiment
- Cpl. B. Baynes, York and Lancaster Regiment
- L./C. A. St. J. Beale, Buckinghamshire Yeomanry
- Sgt. J. Beards, South Staffordshire Regiment
- C.Q.M.S. E. S. Beech, Seaforth Highlanders
- Sapper J. Beech, l/2nd West Lancashire Field Company
- Company Sgt-Maj. E. P. Bell, London Regiment
- Sgt. (Acting Company Sgt-Maj.) B. P. Bellamy, York and Lancaster Regiment
- Sgt-Maj. G. P. Bennett, W. Riding Regiment
- Pte. W. G. Bennett, Gloucestershire Regiment.
- Pte. C. Bent, 7th Bn., Lancashire Fusiliers
- Acting Sgt. J. Bentley, Royal Engineers
- Sgt-Maj. M. R. Bertram, Argyll and Sutherland Highlanders.
- Sgt. (Acting. Staff Sgt-Maj.) W. G. Bews, Army Service Corps
- Q.M.S. (Acting. Sgt-Maj) R. C. Blair, Royal Army Medical Corps
- Sgt. G. Blyth, Manchester Regiment
- Acting. Sgt. W. C. Bodycott, Leicester Regiment
- Acting. Sgt-Maj L. Bonney, Royal Sussex Regiment
- Staff Sgt-Maj A. E. J. Booth, Army Service Regiment
- Staff Sgt-Maj F. Booth, Royal Army Medical Corps
- Sgt. (Acting. Company Q.M.S.) J. W. Booth, West Yorkshire Regiment
- Sgt. D. N. Borthwick, Durham Light Infantry
- Sgt. W. Boyd, Argyll and Sutherland Highlanders
- Staff Sgt-Maj. M. W. Boyer, Army Service Corps
- Company Sgt-Maj. A. Boyle, Royal Scots Fusiliers
- L./C. C. Bradley, Dorset Yeomanry
- Bombardier. J. Bradley, Royal Field Artillery
- Sapper. W. Bradshaw, Royal Engineers
- Company Sgt-Maj. J. Brammall, Yorkshire Regiment
- Cpl. W. Branson, Leicestershire Regiment
- Acting Sgt-Maj. J. Brass, Royal Scots Fusiliers
- Company Sgt-Maj. J. Brennan, Manchester Regiment
- L./Sht. A. G. C. Bridger, Coldstream Guards
- Company Sgt-Maj. (Acting. Sgt/Maj.) J. G. Brooker, East Kent Regiment.
- Pte. G. Brown, Royal Scots Fusiliers
- Sgt. P. Brown, Cameron Highlanders
- Pte. W. Brown, Argyll & Sutherland Highlanders
- Pte. H. Bryant, Bedfordshire Regiment
- Cpl. J. T. Bryant, London Regiment
- Acting Bombardier F. Buckingham, Royal Field Artillery
- Sqdn. Sgt-Maj. F. Bunker, Hertfordshire Yeomanry
- Company Sgt-/Maj. G. Burnop, Essex Regiment
- Pte. W. J. Burns, Royal Welch Fusiliers
- Pte. H. Burrows, Royal Berkshire Regiment
- Sgt. J. Bury, West Riding Regiment
- Sgt-Maj. A. W. Bush, Royal Field Artillery
- Sgt-Maj. C. H. Buss, Somerset Light Infantry
- Sgt. H. T. Byles, Royal Engineers
- Company Sgt-Maj. P. P. Byrne, Liverpool Regiment
- Sgt. W. Cadden, Lancashire Fusiliers
- Acting Sgt-Maj. W. Callow, Royal Warwickshire Regiment
- Sgt. E. Catherall, Royal Welch Fusiliers
- Cpl. W. B. Chambers, Royal Engineers
- L/C. C. J. Chapman, Buckinghamshire Yeomanry
- Cpl. H. Chasney 1st Berkshire Yeomanry
- Company Sgt-Maj. G. Christie, Royal Engineers
- Sgt. T. Christie, Royal Engineers
- Staff Q.M.S. (Acting Staff Sgt-Maj) R. Clayton, Army Service Corps
- Company Sgt-Maj. T. F. Clements, Royal Engineers
- Sgt. D. J. Clow, 2nd Scottish Horse
- L/C. A. Cohen, Liverpool Regiment
- L/C. A. Collens, Manchester Regiment
- L/C. C. Collins, Dorset Yeomanry
- Sgt. C. A. Collins, A. Cyclist Corps
- Sgt. C. B. Colston, Royal Engineers
- Cpl. W. H. Corkish, 20th Infantry Brigade
- Sgt. P. Costello, Scots Guards
- Cpl. (Acting Company Sgt-Maj) C. Couchman, Royal Engineers
- Pte. W. Coulter, 2nd Scottish Horse
- Acting. Company Sgt-Maj J. A. Cox, London Regiment
- L./Sgt. S. A. De Ste. Croix, Royal Warwickshire Regiment
- Company Sgt-Maj. F. Croome, Gloucestershire Regiment
- Company Sgt-Maj. M. T. Cumming, Seaforth Highlanders
- Sgt. W. H. Cunnington, Norfolk Regiment
- Pte. H. Curtis, Gloucestershire Regiment
- Pte. W. H. Curtis, Dorset Regiment
- Flight Sgt. H. G. Dadley, Royal Flying Corps.
- Sgt. L. G. Dance, Royal Field Artillery
- L./Sgt. J. S. Danks, Coldstream Guards
- Staff Sgt-Maj. W. L. Dargan, Army Service Corps
- Sgt. H. E. Davey, Hertfordshire Regiment
- Sapper J. H. Davey, Royal Monmouthshire Royal Engineers
- Company Sgt-Maj. H. M. Davies, Royal Engineers
- L./C. A. Davis, Manchester Regiment
- Pte. R. D. Davis, West Riding Regiment
- Sgt. A. W. Davison, Royal Engineers
- Sgt. W. E. Dawson, Norfolk Yeomanry
- Sgt. M. Day, Worcestershire Regiment
- Sgt. A. Dearman, Yorkshire Regiment
- Pte. J. Deas, 1st Bn., Cameron Highlanders
- Cpl. (Acting. Sgt.) D.A. Dewar, Royal Engineers
- Company Sgt-Maj H.Deyermond, 82nd Royal Engineers
- Pte. (Acting Cpl.) T. G. Dickens, Grenadier Guards.
- Pnr. (Acting L./C.) R. Dicker, Royal Engineers
- L./Sgt. W. E. Digby, A. Cyclist Corps
- Sgt. (Acting Company Sgt-Maj) T. G. Dixon, Royal Engineers
- R.Q.M.S. L. Dowle, Devon Regiment
- Pte T. Dowling, Northumberland Fusiliers
- Cpl. S. G. Downs, Royal Field Artillery
- Sgt. H. F. Drewry, Lincolnshire Regiment
- Staff Sgt. W. Dudding, 1st Indian Mule Cart Corps
- Pte. (Acting L./C.) Dufour-Clark, Army Service Corps
- L./C. T. Dunn, Royal Scots
- Sgt. A. Durrant, Royal Engineers
- Company Sgt-Maj. L. Dwyer, Welsh Regiment
- Company. Q./M.S. J. Dyke, Wiltshire Regiment
- L./C. E. E. Eames, London Regiment
- Cpl. S. V. Edge, Middlesex Regiment
- Cpl. T. Edney, Royal Garrison Artillery.
- Company Sgt-Maj T. J. Edwards, North Lancashire Regiment
- Sgt. H. G. England, West Riding Regiment
- Staff Sgt-Mgr. M. H. Faint, Army Service Corps
- Company Sgt-Mgr P. E. Fairley, London Regiment
- Acting Bombardier A. W. Farnfield, Royal Field Artillery
- Acting Sgt-Mgr. M. J. Farnworth, North Lancashire Regiment
- Sapper. J. Farrell, Royal Engineers
- Sgt. L. Farrington, A. Cyclist Corps
- Acting Battery. Q.M.S. W. W. Fenn, Royal Garrison Artillery
- Acting Staff Sgt. E. Fenner, Royal Army Medical Corps
- Acting L./C. R. Ferguson, Highland Light Infantry
- Cpl. (Acting Sgt.) J. Firth, West Yorkshire Regiment
- Sapper R. Fogg, Royal Engineers
- Pte. J. Folan, Connaught Rangers
- Sgt-Maj. W. Forbes, Seaforth Highlanders
- Sgt. E. Ford, Royal Highlanders
- L./Sgt. S. Ford, Wiltshire Regiment
- Sgt. W. J. Fordham, Royal Horse Artillery
- Sgt. W. T. Foster, Royal Engineers
- Company Sgt-Maj G. E. Fowler, Bedfordshire Regiment
- Pte. T. Foy, South Lancashire Regiment
- Bombardier J. Francey, Royal Field Artillery
- Sgt. G. W. Franks, Royal Engineers
- Company Sgt-Maj C. W. Froome, London Regiment
- Company Sgt-Maj. G. A. Fuller, West Riding Regiment
- Pte. (Acting Cpl.) W. J. Gaffney, Essex Regiment
- Acting. Cpl. H. Garner, Rifle Brigade
- Acting Sgt. J. Gaskarth, Royal Engineers
- Company Sgt-Maj. E. E. Gawthorn, Royal Engineers
- Sgt-Maj. T. Geggie, King's Own Scottish Borderers
- Pte. W. George, Royal Highlanders
- Sgt. S. Gibbins, Welsh Regiment
- Sub-Condr. (Acting. Condr.) T. A. Gibbon, Army Ordnance Corps
- Sgt. W. M. Gibbs, Dorset Yeomanry
- Cpl. R. Gibney, Royal Irish Fusiliers.
- Pte. D. Gibson, Royal Scottish Fusiliers
- Pte. D. Gildea, Yorkshire Regiment
- L./C. R. Gilholme, Northumberland Fusiliers
- Battery Sgt-Mag C. Gill, Motor Machine Gun Service
- Sgt. R. W. Gill, Manchester Regiment
- Cpl. E. J. Gingell, Gloucestershire Regiment.
- Sgt-Maj. M. E. J. Glazebrook, Royal Welch Fusiliers
- Acting Company Sgt-Maj. C. V. Goble, Royal Scots Fusiliers
- L./C. J. Golding, Lancashire Fusiliers
- Trans. Sgt. A. Gordon, London Regiment
- Sapper A. Gourlay, Royal Engineers
- Staff Sgt-Maj. G. H. Gracey, Army Service Corps
- Sgt. J. H. Graham, North Lancashire Regiment
- Battery Sgt-Maj. H. Grant, Royal Field Artillery
- Cpl. J. M. Grant, Ceylon Planters' Rifle Corps, Ind. Army
- Sgt. J. Grayston, Royal Engineers
- Sgt. L. E. Green, Royal Engineers
- Sgt. W. Greenall, Liverpool Regiment
- Sgt. J. Greenhalgh, Manchester Regiment
- Sapper W. Grice, Royal Engineers
- Company Sgt-Maj. E. B. Griggs, Royal Engineers
- Sgt. A. F. Grimble, Yorkshire Regiment
- Staff Sgt-Maj. A. C. Grimwood, Army Service Corps
- Sgt. I. T. Guest, Royal Engineers
- L/C. R. E. Guy, Dorset Yeomanry
- Condr. P. A. Hadland, Army Ordnance Corps
- Sgt. W. Halsey, Hampshire Regiment
- Sgt. P. Hambley, 26th By., Royal Field Artillery
- Sgt. F. R. Hamilton, Yorkshire Regiment
- L./C. J. Hampshire, Royal Engineers
- Q.M.S. T. Hampton, Royal Highlanders
- Company Sgt-Maj.(Acting Sgt-Maj. T.Hannon, Royal Welch Fusiliers
- Sgt. F. Harding, North Somerset Yeomanry
- L./C. (Acting 2nd Cpl.) W. J. Hargreaves, Royal Engineers
- Temp. Sgt-Maj. S. Harman, Army Veterinary Corps
- Staff Sgt-Maj. J. Harold, Army Service Corps
- Sgt. T. Harper, Machine Gun Company (formerly Gordon Highlanders)
- Pte. P. Harrigan, Royal Scots Fusiliers
- Cpl. H. Hart, Berkshire Yeomanry
- Company Sgt-Maj. M.T. Hart, Royal West Surrey Regiment
- Sgt. A. Harvey, Lancashire Fusiliers
- Cpl. F. Harvey, Suffolk Regiment
- Sgt. R. T. C. Hassell, Royal Fusiliers
- Acting Sgt-Maj. J. E. Hawkes, London Regiment
- Sgt. T. Hawkins, South Staffordshire Regiment
- Cpl. C. Hayward, Royal Berkshire Regiment
- Company Sgt-Maj. (Actg. Sgt-Maj.) C. Hazlehurst, North Staffordshire Regiment
- L./Sgt. J. Hazlett, Royal Scots Fusiliers
- R.Q.M.S. R. W. Hearn, Royal Sussex Regiment
- Sgt. E. Heath, Royal Field Artillery
- Sgt-Maj. E. Heaysman, Royal Lancashire Regiment
- Company Sgt-Maj. J. Heigh, Royal Engineers
- Company Sgt-Maj. J. E. Henderson, Border Regiment
- Sgt. M. P. Hennessey, Royal Welch Fusiliers
- Sgt. W. W. Hepher, Royal Engineers
- Company Sgt-Maj. (Acting Sgt-Maj.) G. E. E. Hewes, Yorkshire Light Infantry.
- Cpl. E. M. Hewson, Leicestershire Regiment
- Company Sgt-Maj. H. Hibbett, Royal West Kent Regiment
- Cpl. R. P. Higgins, Buckinghamshire Yeomanry
- Sgt-Maj. (now 2nd Lt.) A. J. Hill, Wiltshire Regiment
- Battery Sgt-Maj. A.J. Hill, Royal Field Artillery
- Company Sgt-Maj. G. Hill, London Regiment
- Cpl. T. H. Hilliar, Gloucestershire Regiment
- Company Sgt-Maj. M.J. Hodge, Liverpool Regiment
- Sgt. S. Holloway, London Regiment
- Sgt. P. H. Holman, Royal Garrison Artillery
- Staff Sgt. H. S. Holmes, Army Service Corps
- Acting Sgt-Maj. J. T. Hood, Royal Field Artillery.
- Sgt. D. Hook, Royal Scots
- Acting Cpl. A. R. Hooper, Royal Garrison Artillery
- Sgt. (Acting Staff Sgt-Maj.) C.W.Hopkins, Army Service Corps
- Q.M.S. T. Horler, Somerset Light Infantry
- Company Sgt-Maj W. G. Howard, Notts and Derby Regiment
- Battery. Sgt-Maj T. W. Howes, Royal Field Artillery
- Company Sgt-Maj. W.H.Hudson, Royal Engineers
- Pte. P. Hull, Army Service Corps
- Staff Sgt-Maj H. E. Humphries, Army Service Corps
- Company Sgt-Maj. R. Hunter, Durham Light Infantry
- Sjt. F. C. Jackson, E. Surrey Regiment (Sgt-Maj. London Regiment)
- Acting Sgt-Maj H. A. Jackson, Lincolnshire Regiment
- Pte. J. Jackson, Essex Regiment
- Cpl. (Acting Sgt.) T. G. Jackson, 2nd Dragoon Guards
- Cpl. H. Jacobs, London Regiment
- Cpl. F. R. James, Royal Fusiliers
- Sqdn. Q.M.S. W. R. James, Dorset Yeomanry
- Acting Company Sgt-Maj. J. Jarvis, Welsh Regiment
- L./C. A. Jones, Bedfordshire Regiment
- Pte. C. F. Jones, 6th Bn., Lincolnshire Regiment
- L./C. C. H. Jones, Welsh Regiment
- Sgt. I. Jones, Welsh Regiment
- Cpl. J. G. Jones, Royal Field Artillery
- Sgt. R. O. Jones, Royal Engineers
- L./C. E. Joyce, Royal Welch Fusiliers
- Acting Sgt. W. A. Judge, Army Service Corps
- Sgt. A. E. Keane, Military Mounted Police.
- Pte. W. J. Keen, Essex Regiment
- Sgt. S. Keith, Gordon Highlanders
- Sgt. J. B. Kelly, Welsh Regiment
- Sgt. W. Kelly, King's Own Scottish Borderers
- Cpl. P. H. Kendall, Royal Field Artillery
- L./C. A. Kennard, 5th Lancers
- Acting Battery Sgt-Maj. F. Kennedy, l/2nd Lovat's Scouts
- Acting. Cpl. J. Kerr, Royal Highlanders.
- Company Sgt-Maj. W. Kerrigan, Leinster Regiment
- Pte. C. Kershaw, Coldstream Guards
- Cpl. W. H.. King, Royal North Devon Yeomanry
- Sgt. A. G. Kirkwood, Royal Engineers
- Pte. L. Knott, Royal Welch Fusiliers (late South Wales Borderers)
- L./C. J. Knox, Royal Scots Fusiliers
- Sgt. J. Lacy, Royal Engineers
- Battery Sgt-Maj. J. Lamb, Royal Field Artillery
- L./C. W. Lamplugh, Royal Army Medical Corps.
- Pte. L. Lawton, North Staffordshire Regiment
- Sgt.-Drmr. E. C. Lee, Essex Regiment
- Company Sgt-Maj. G. Lee, Yorkshire Light Infantry.
- Cpl. J. T. Lees, Royal Engineers
- L./C. W. R. Lees, Royal Irish Rifles
- Staff Sgt. F. G. Levings, Indian Army
- Company Sgt-Maj M. W. Lightfoot, Border Regiment
- Pte. W. H. Lines, Norfolk Regiment
- Pte. S. Littleford, Manchester Regiment
- Squadron Sgt-Maj. A. Littleworth, Dorset Yeomanry
- Company Sgt-Maj. E. Lockwood, Royal Engineers
- Company Sgt-Maj. H. Lodge, West Yorkshire Regiment
- L./C. S. Lovejoy, Royal Highlanders
- Sgt. F. H. Lucas, Royal Army Medical Corps
- Sgt. H. G. Lupton, London Regiment
- L./C. D. MacAulay, Cameron Highlanders
- Acting Sgt-Maj. C. MacDonald, Manchester Regiment
- Company Sgt-Maj (Acting Sgt-Maj.) J. Mackie, Liverpool Regiment
- Pte. F. T. Major, 10th Bn., London Regiment
- Battery Sgt-Maj. H. Males, Royal Field Artillery
- Acting Bombardier. A. E. Marsh, Royal Field Artillery
- Gunner G. W. G. Marshall, Royal Horse Artillery
- Trooper. A. L. Martin, 3rd County of London Yeomanry
- Company Sgt-Maj. E. A. Mascott, Royal Highlanders
- Company Sgt-Maj. G. Mason, Seaforth Highlanders.
- Sgt. E. B. May, 3rd County of London Yeomanry
- Pte. F. McCann, 1st Dragoons.
- Company Sgt-Maj. T. McCarty, Manchester Regiment
- Company Sgt-Maj. B. A. McCombie, London Regiment
- Pte. L. McDougall, 1st Lovat's Scouts
- Company Sgt-Maj. A. McDowell, Manchester Regiment
- Sgt. J. McFarland, Motor Machine Gun Service (late 20th Hussars)
- Cpl. M: McGeoch, l/3rd Scottish Horse
- Company Sgt-Maj. J. McHardy, Royal Highlanders
- Pte. J. R. Mclritree, Essex Regiment
- Flight-Sgt. (Acting Sgt-Maj.) H. McKenna, Royal Flying Corps
- Sgt. D. McLean, Argyll & Sutherland Highlanders
- Pte. A. McLellan, 1st Lovat's Scouts
- 2nd Cpl. (Acting. Cpl.) T. E. McNally, Royal Engineers
- Sqdn. Sgt-Maj. R. McWatt, 2nd Scottish Horse
- Sjt. J. Medlock, York and Lancaster. Regiment
- Staff Sgt-Maj. C.E. Metcalf, Army Service Corps
- Acting Bombardier F. Miles, Royal Field Artillery
- Company. Sgt-Maj. A. W. Miller, South Wales Borderers
- Acting Regimental Sgt-Maj. W. Miller, Royal Garrison Artillery
- Acting Company Q.M.S. J. E. Mills, Cheshire Regiment
- Company Sgt-Maj. W. H. Mills, Royal West Kent Regiment
- Acting Sgt-Maj.. A. Milton, Bedfordshire Regiment
- L./C. L. C. Mires, 4th Hussars
- Sub. Condr. (Acting Condr.) P.J. Moloney, Army Ordnance Corps
- L./C. R. Moore, Norfolk Regiment
- Company Sgt-Maj. E. H. Morgan, Wiltshire Regiment
- Pte. W. Morgan, South Wales Borderers
- Sgt-Maj W. J. Morris, Royal Engineers
- Pte. A. Morrison, Army Service Corps
- Acting Sgt-Maj. M. J. Morrison, Manchester Regiment
- Acting Company Sgt-Maj. F. Mortimer, Nottinghamshire & Derbyshire Regiment
- Pte. (Acting L./C.) R. Morton, King's Own Scottish Borderers
- Pte. J. S. Murphy, 8th Hussars
- Pte S. Murphy, Royal Irish Rifles
- Condr. D. Murray, Army Ordnance Corps
- Company Sgt-Maj. R. Murray, Seaforth Highlander
- Sgt. H. J. Musto, Royal Berkshire Regiment
- Sgt-Maj. W. Myers, Northumberland Fusiliers
- Sgt. E. Nash, Gloucestershire Regiment
- Drmr. E. G. Neal, London Regiment
- Sgt. (Acting Company Sgt-Maj.) A. Needham, Royal Engineers
- Sgt. J. R Neilson, Royal Engineers
- Sgt. W. Ness, South Lancashire Regiment
- L./C. J. Newsham, Lancashire Fusiliers
- Company Sgt-Maj. E. Nicholson, South Lancashire Regiment.
- Sqdn. Sgt-Maj. F. G. Nicholson, 19th Hussars
- Sgt. T. Oates, Royal Engineers
- Acting Sgt. P. O'Brien, Royal Munster Fusiliers
- Sgt. J. O'Connor, Royal Dublin Fusiliers
- Sqdn. Sgt-Maj. A. Ogilvie, 1st Fife and Forfar Yeomanry
- Superintending Clerk C. J. O'Keefe, Royal Engineers
- Sgt. F. Owen, Royal Engineers
- Company Sgt-Maj. H. Oxley, King's Royal Rifle Corps
- Acting Sgt-Maj. H. Page, Royal Sussex Regiment
- Pte. W. Page, Army Service Corps
- Gunner (Acting Bombardier) W. E. Page, Royal Horse Artillery
- Bombardier. J. W. Palmer, Royal Field Artillery
- Sgt-Maj. G. Parker, North Staffordshire Regiment (now 2nd Lt., Hampshire Regiment)
- Company Sgt-Maj. F. W. Pascall, Royal Fusiliers
- Sgt. H. Passmore, Royal Garrison Artillery
- Actg. Bombardier G. Pateman, Royal Field Artillery
- Company Sgt-Maj. P. Pattison, Royal Welch Fusiliers
- Sgt. R. C. Payne, Royal Engineers
- Sgt. E. M. Pearce, B. By., Royal Field Artillery
- Cpl. (Acting Sgt.) C. T. Pearse, Royal Engineers
- Company Sgt-Maj. C. Pearson, Royal West Kent Regiment
- Sgt. G. R. Pearson, Durham Light Infantry
- Pte. S. T. Peet, East Kent Regiment
- Battery. Sgt-Maj. W. J. Perigo, Royal Field Artillery
- Company Sgt-Maj. H. R. Phelps, Army Service Corps
- Pte. H. F. Pickering, Royal Warwickshire Regiment
- Acting Company Sgt-Maj. D. Pickford, Nottinghamshire and Derbyshire Regiment
- Bombardier N. Pigot, Royal Field Artillery
- Pte. J. Pittendreigh, 1st Scottish Horse
- Pte. W. G. Polain, Worcestershire Regiment
- Company Sgt-Maj. D. N. Pollock, Cameron Highlanders
- Staff Sgt. (Acting. Staff Sgt-Maj.) C. H. Porter, Army Service Corps
- Sgt-Maj. E. Porter, Royal Flying Corps
- Sgt. F. W. Potts, Manchester Regiment
- Pte. G. Powell, Army Service Corps
- Sapper H. Proctor, Royal Engineers
- Pte. T. J. Puplett, Army Service Corps
- Q.M.S. F. J. Purnell, Gloucestershire Regiment
- Sgt. E. J. Quick, Royal Engineers
- Sgt-Maj. W. F. Rainsford, Royal Sussex Regiment
- Cpl. J. O. Ramsay, Royal Engineers
- Dvr. H. Randall, Army Service Corps
- Company Sgt-Maj. H. Ray, S. Lancashire Regiment
- R.Q.M.S. G. Reddock, South Lancashire Regiment
- Q.M.S. T. W. Redmore, Royal Engineers
- Sqdn. Sgt-Maj. (Acting Sgt-Maj.) W. J. Reeves, 2nd Dragoons
- Pte. J. Regan, A. Cyclist Corps
- Company Sgt-Maj. W. A. Rice, South Lancashire Regiment
- Sgt. A. C. Richards, Royal Welch Fusiliers
- Sgt. J. J. Richardson, Royal Engineers
- Sgt. A. C. Riddett, Rifle Brigade
- Acting Battery Sgt-Maj A. Ridgers, Royal Field Artillery
- 1st Class Staff Sgt-Maj. J. Rigby, Army Service Corps
- Gunner H. E. Roach, Royal Field Artillery
- Drummer J. E. Roberts, London Regiment
- Gunner F. Robinson, Royal Field Artillery
- Sgt. J. Robinson, Cameron Highlanders
- Pte. J. Rock, King's Royal Rifle Corps
- Gunner E. W. Rose, Royal Garrison Artillery
- Staff Sgt-Maj. J. W. Rose, Army Service Corps
- Sgt. S. W. Roshier, 17th Lancers
- Sgt. A. Ross, Royal Engineers
- Bombardier. W. Ross, Royal Field Artillery
- Sgt. A. Rumbelow, Rifle Brigade
- Sgt. J. W. Russell, Royal Engineers
- Staff Sgt. (Acting Staff Q.M.S.) A. J. Ryan, Army Service Corps
- Company Sgt-Maj. T. Ryan, King's Own Scottish Borderers
- Company Sgt-Maj. T. Ryan, Worcestershire Regiment
- Gunner P. Ryding, Royal Field Artillery
- Cpl. D. Salt, Nottinghamshire and Derbyshire Regiment
- Company Sgt-Maj. C. H. Sargeant, Rifle Brigade
- Company Sgt-Maj. F. R. Saunders, London Regiment
- Company Sgt-Maj (now 2nd Lt.) C. Savin, King's Own Rifle Corps
- Pte. H. A. Sawyer, Army Service Corps
- Sgt. T. Scothorne, Leicestershire Regiment
- Sgt-Maj. A. K. Scott, Cameron Highlanders
- Pte. T. Seddon, Manchester Regiment
- Sgt-Maj. T. G. Seignior, Essex Regiment
- Company Sgt-Maj. (Acting Sgt-Maj.) W. G. Self, Royal Engineers
- Sgt. L. M. Sharp, Royal Engineers
- Cpl. T. Sharpe, Northern Regiment
- Pte. A. Shea, East Lancashire Regiment
- L./C. J. Shearer, Scottish Rifles
- Acting Bombardier A. Shelley, Royal Field Artillery
- Sapper T. Siddons, Royal Engineers
- L./Sgt. J. Silcox, South Wales Borderers
- L./C. H. W. Simmons, South Wales Borderers
- L./C. A. Simpson, West Riding Regiment
- Company Sgt-Maj. J. H. Slater, Durham Light Infantry
- Pte. C. H. Smith, Royal Fusiliers
- Acting Staff Sgt-Maj. E. A. Smith, Army Service Corps
- Sgt. G. Smith, Leicestershire Regiment
- Sgt. J. Smith, Royal Field Artillery
- Company Q.M.S. J. H. Smith, Cheshire Regiment
- Cpl. (Acting Sgt.) T. Smith, Leicestershire Regiment
- Pte. T. Smith, East Lancashire Regiment
- L./Sgt. W. Smith, Royal Fusiliers
- Sgt. R. Snowdon, Argyll and Sutherland Highlanders
- Company. Sgt-Maj. W. Soughton, Royal Sussex Regiment
- Cpl. (Acting. Sjt.) G. J. P. Spollen, Northamptonshire Regiment
- Sgt. J. R.Stagg, Middlesex Regiment
- L./C. J. G. Staples, Wiltshire Regiment
- L./C. (Acting Sgt.) E. Starrs, Highland Light Infantry
- Sgt. H. Steel, 4th Dragoon Guards
- Sapper D. Stewart, Royal Engineers
- Sgt. H. Stewart, Gordon Highlanders
- Pte. R. Stewart, Royal Scots Fusiliers
- Company Sgt-Maj. A. Stirzaker, West Riding Regiment
- L./Sgt. E. E. Stocking, London Regiment
- L./C. J. W. Stott, Middlesex Regiment
- Temp. Sub. Condr. W.J. Streek, Army Ordnance Corps
- Gunner C. G. Street, Royal Garrison Artillery
- Acting Cpl. R. C. Sugars, London Regiment
- L/C. F. Summers, Yorkshire Light Infantry
- Sgt. O. Summers, Royal Warwickshire Regiment
- Gunner A. Sweeting, Royal Field Artillery
- Pte. H. Sykes, West Riding Regiment
- Acting Sgt. T. H. Symonds, Royal Engineers
- Acting Bombardier F. Taylor, Royal Horse Artillery
- Company Q.M.S. F. Tebbs, Royal Engineers
- L./C. J. Temple, Royal Scots
- Sgt. J. Thelwell, Royal Welch Fusiliers
- Cpl. A. J. Thomas, Royal Engineers
- Cpl. L. Thomas, I/1st Berkshire Yeomanry
- Pte. S. E. Till, South Staffordshire Regiment
- Sgt. A. J. Tilney, 4th Dragoon Guards
- Cpl. J. Tindle, Royal Engineers
- Pte. W. Tolley, Royal Warwickshire Regiment
- Company Sgt-Maj. (Acting Sgt-Maj.) W. H. Tolley, Worcestershire Regiment
- Staff Sgt. R. G. Topley, Army Service Corps
- Cpl. (Acting Sgt.) J. W. Trimmer, Royal Berkshire Regiment
- Sgt. E. Trowbridge, Royal Horse Artillery
- Sgt. (Acting Company Sgt-Maj.) H. A. Turner, Shropshire Light Infantry
- Acting Sub-Condr. J. G. Turner, Army Ordnance Corps
- Cpl. E. Twigg, Manchester Regiment
- Sgt-Maj. H. Underwood, Royal Army Medical Corps
- Acting Company Sgt-Maj. A. Unwin, Cheshire Regiment
- Sgt. J. A. Verner, Royal Irish Rifles
- Sapper E. H. Vick, Royal Engineers
- L./C. J. A. Vickery, Seaforth Highlanders
- Sgt. D. Voyles, Irish Guards
- Pte. F. Waddell, Royal Scots
- Acting Sgt-Maj. J. H. Wagner, Gloucestershire Regiment
- Q.M.S. E. Walker, South Staffordshire Regiment
- Gunner J. L, Walker, Royal Field Artillery
- Company Sgt-Maj. W. Walker, Suffolk Regiment
- Cpl. W. H. Ward, Royal Field Artillery
- Company Sgt-Maj. G. Waterhouse, Royal Engineers
- Cpl. J. Watkinson, North Lancashire Regiment
- Cpl. (Acting Sgt.) J. Waymont, South Staffordshire Regiment
- Company Sgt-Maj. P. F. Weaver, Coldstream Guards
- Sgt. J. Webber, 1/lst Welsh Horse
- Company Sgt-Maj. (Acting Sgt-Maj.) C. Wells, Dorset Regiment
- Company Q.M.S. (Acting Sgt-Maj) C. E. White, Coldstream Guards
- Sgt. F. White, South Wales Borderers (since transferred to Machine Gun Corps)
- L./C. G. Whitehead, East Lancashire Regiment
- Staff Q.M.S. J. Whitehouse, Army Service Corps
- Sgt. F. Wilkinson, Royal Field Artillery
- Pte. G. B. Wilson, Army Service Corps
- L./C. J. Wilson, Lanark Yeomanry
- Sgt, W. Wilson, Northern Regiment
- Sgt. W. Wilson, Lanark Yeomanry
- Company Sgt-Maj. A. E. Winton, Royal Engineers
- Acting Sgt-Maj. P. Witheridge, Rifle Brigade
- Company Sgt-Maj. J. Wood, Wiltshire Regiment
- Sgt-Maj. W. Woodman, Royal Field Artillery
- Pte. T. Worrall, Middlesex Regiment
- L./Sgt. B. Worsley, Worcestershire Regiment
- L./C. G. Wright, 14th Hussars
- Company Sgt-Maj. W. Wright, South Staffordshire Regiment
- Company Sgt-Maj. E. Yates, Scottish Rifles
- Sgt. T. H. Young, Royal West Surrey Regiment
- L./C. W. Young, East Surrey Regiment

Australian Imperial Force

- L./C. T. W. Adeney, Australian Engineers
- Cpl. G. D. Cook, 2nd Australian Field Artillery Brigade Headquarters
- Pte. J. G. Cosson, Australian Imperial Force
- L./C. F. G. Crisp, 1st Aus. Light Horse Regiment
- Pte. A. Croft, Australian Imperial Force
- Sgt. W. C. Foulsum, Australian Engineers
- Pte. W. Goudemey, Australian Imperial Force
- Cpl. W. M. Green, Australian Imperial Force
- L./C. F. Horan, Australian Imperial Force
- Sgt. E. H. Jackson, Australian Imperial Force
- L/Cpl. W. H. Kenny, 1st Australian Light Horse Brigade.
- Sgt. J. B. Kirkwood, Australian Imperial Force
- Cpl. J. M. MacDonald, 2nd Australian Light Horse Regiment
- Pte. V. G. R. McDonald, Australian Imperial Force
- Cpl. W. McNicol, Australian Artillery
- Sgt. F. T. Newsom, Australian Engineers
- Pte. W. Nichol, Australian Imperial Force
- Sgt. M. J. O'Brien, Australian Imperial Force
- Cpl. J. A. Park, Australian Engineers
- Trooper. T. Renton, 10th Australian Light Horse Regiment
- L./C. W. C. Scurry, Australian Imperial Force
- Cpl. J. Shaw, Australian Engineers
- Sgt-Maj. H. E. Wawn, Australian Imperial Force

Canadian Force

- Pte. F. Armes, 4th Canadian Infantry Battalion
- Sgt. J. Cameron, 28th Canadian Infantry Battalion
- L./C. O. Denman, 2nd Canadian Infantry Battalion
- Gunner J. T. Donnelly, 2nd Canadian Divisional Artillery
- Sgt. J. Dungan, 29th Canadian Infantry Battalion
- Pte. S. Flansberg, Royal Canadian Regiment
- Company Sgt-Maj. W. G. Fraser, 15th Canadian Infantry Battalion
- Company Sgt-Maj. J. Girvan, Canadian Army Service Corps
- Company Sgt-Maj. C.F. E. Hall, 13th Canadian Infantry Battalion
- Company Sgt-Maj. A. Handcock, 14th Canadian Infantry Battalion
- Sgt-Maj. W. De F. Henderson, Canadian Engineers
- Pte. T. F. Ingram, 25th Canadian Infantry Battalion
- Sgt. D. M. Jemmett, 1st Canadian Divisional Engineers
- Sigr. R. G. Jones, 3rd Canadian Infantry Battalion
- Acting Bombardier E. M. King, Royal Canadian Horse Artillery
- Pte. E. Leger, 22nd Canadian Infantry Battalion
- Sgt. D. MacRae, 31st Canadian Infantry Battalion
- Sgt-Maj. A. G. Mackie, 5th Canadian Infantry Battalion
- Sgt-Maj G. C. Massey, Canadian Engineers
- Battery Sgt-Maj. N. E. McKinnon, 1st Canadian Divisional Artillery
- S.Q.M.S. A. D. McNeill, Lord Strathcona's Horse
- Cpl. G. R. McNicol, Canadian Army Service Corps
- Cpl. A. McI. Morrison, Canadian Engineers
- Cpl. A. C. Oxley, 1st Canadian Divisional Engineers
- Company Sgt-Maj. T. Patterson. 27th Canadian Infantry Battalion
- Cpl. C. Platts, 1st Canadian Divisional Engineers
- Pte. L. Preston, 7th Canadian Infantry Battalion
- Pte. E. M. Robertson, 26th Canadian Infantry Battalion
- L./C. L. A. Robertson, Canadian Mounted Rifles
- Battery Sgt-Maj. J. Smith, 1st Canadian Divisional Artillery

Newfoundland Contingent

- Pte. W. J. Gladney, 1st Newfoundland Regiment

New Zealand Force

- Pte. J. F. Cardno, New Zealand Medical Corps
- Sgt. J. H. Francis, 1st Auckland Battalion, New Zealand Force
- Sgt. (now 2nd Lt.) A. G. Henderson, 1st Otago Battalion, New Zealand Force
- Sgt S. Jenkins, New Zealand Divisional Train
- Sgt. J.Little, Otago Mounted Rifle Regiment, New Zealand Force
- Sgt-Maj. F. W. Moor, New Zealand. Medical Corps
- Cpl. H. Rhind, Canterbury Battalion, New Zealand Force.

==== Awarded a Clasp to the Distinguished Conduct Medal ====
- Acting Company Sgt-Maj. W. L. Mclntyre, King's Royal Rifle Corps

=== Military Medal (MM) ===
- L./Sgt. (Acting Sgt.) E. Abell, South Staffordshire Regiment
- Gunner W. Abigail, Royal Field Artillery
- Cpl. E. Adaway, Rifle Brigade
- Cpl. F. Ainley, Royal Engineers
- Sgt. H. Aitken, Gordon Highlanders
- L./C. G. Alcock, Worcestershire Regiment
- Cpl. (Acting Sgt.) J. A. Allam, Royal Engineers
- 2nd Cpl. (Acting Cpl.) G. Allan, Royal Engineers
- Pte. G. Allan, Middlesex Regiment
- Cpl. J. Allardyce, London Regiment
- Sgt. W. Allcock, Nottinghamshire and Derbyshire Regiment
- Pte. A. J. Allen, West Yorkshire Regiment
- Sgt. (now temp. 2nd Lt.) C. F. Allen, North Lancashire Regiment
- Pte. C. R. Allen, Gloucestershire Regiment
- Pte. J. Allen, Oxfordshire and Buckinghamshire Light Infantry
- Cpl. R. Allison, Yorkshire and Lancashire Regiment
- Pte. L. Allthorpe, Norfolk Regiment
- Cpl. F. J. Amatt, Royal Engineers
- Sgt. H. J. Ambrose, Royal Engineers
- Pte. D. B. Anderson, Royal Army Medical Corps
- L./C. J. Anderson, West Yorkshire Regiment
- L./C. W. Anderson, Highland Light Infantry
- L./C. J. Andrews, West Yorkshire Regiment
- L./C. L. Andrews, Monmouthshire Regiment
- L./C. C. Angulatta, Grenadier Guards
- Sgt. T. R. Archibald, Royal Scots
- Cpl. G. Armer, 2nd Bn., Yorkshire and Lancashire Regiment
- Actg. Sgt, B. G. Ashby, Northamptonshire Regiment
- L./Sgt. A. E. Ashley, East Yorkshire Regiment
- Sgt. E. Ashley, Royal Field Artillery
- Cpl. T. Askin, Royal Field Artillery
- L./Sgt. J. Aspey, Highland Light Infantry
- L./C. H. O. Asquith, Yorkshire and Lancashire Regiment
- Pte. G. T. Atkins, Essex Regiment
- Cpl. C. J. Atkinson, Bedfordshire Regiment
- Pte. R. H. Atkinson, West Riding Regiment
- Sapper J. Axon, Royal Engineers
- Cpl. J. Aynsley, Northumberland Fusiliers
- L./C. P. Bacher, Northamptonshire Regiment
- Sgt. N. H. Bacon, Rifle Brigade
- Sgt. J. Baggley, Lincolnshire Regiment
- Cpl. H. C.Bagley, Royal Warwickshire Regiment
- Pte. J. H. Baker, Royal West Kent Regiment
- Sgt. F. Baker, Royal Irish Fusiliers
- Sgt. W. C. Baldrey, London Regiment
- Sgt. I. H. Baldwin, Royal Field Artillery
- Sgt. J. W. Baldwin, Oxfordshire and Buckinghamshire Light Infantry
- Sapper S. Ballett, Royal Engineers
- Sgt. F. W. Bamber, Royal Engineers
- Sgt. E. L. Bamberger, Royal Engineers
- L./Sgt. (now temp. 2nd Lt.) R. C. Bambridge, Royal Fusiliers
- L./C. A. Barber, Essex Regiment
- Cpl. J. Barbossa, Lancashire Fusiliers
- Pte. T. Barbour, Scottish Rifles
- Pte. W. Barnes, South Staffordshire Regiment
- Sgt R. W. Barrett, London Regiment '
- Cpl. J. Barrington, Royal Fusiliers
- L/Sgt. H. Barrow, West Riding Regiment.
- Sgt. G. Bate, King's Royal Rifle Corps
- Cpl. (Acting Sgt.) J.S. Bateman, 9th Lancers
- Sapper F. J. Bates, Royal Engineers
- L./C. G. A. Bates, Bedfordshire Yeomanry
- Pte. W. Batley, Middlesex Regiment
- Gunner F. J. Battersby, Royal Field Artillery
- Pte. R. Baxter, 2nd Dragoons
- Sgt. G. A. Bayley, Royal Engineers
- Sgt. G. 3. Bayley, London Regiment
- Pte. G. Beach, South Wales Borderers
- Gunner R. Beadnell, Royal Field Artillery
- Sgt. J. R. Bean, Royal Fusiliers
- Sgt. A. W. Beasley, Royal Berkshire Regiment
- Cpl. (Actg. Sgt.) B. J. Beckett, Royal Engineers
- Staff Sgt. (Actg. Staff Sgt-Maj.) W. A. Bedding, Army Service Corps
- Sgt. (Actg. Staff Sgt.) W, Beer, Army Veterinary Corps
- Sapper A. G. Beeson, Royal Engineers
- Pte. J. G. Begg, Gordon Highlanders
- Gunner S. Belding, Motor Machine Gun Service.
- Cpl. A. Bell, Royal Garrison Artillery
- Flight Sgt. (Acting Sgt-Maj.) T. Bell, Royal Flying Corps
- Sgt. W. Bell, Royal Lancashire Regiment
- Acting Cpl. T. Belliss, Royal Engineers
- Pte. H. Benjamin, Welsh Regiment
- Staff Q.M.S. (Acting Staff Sgt-Maj) C. G. Bennett, Army Service Corps
- Pte. H. Bennett, Leicestershire Regiment
- Sgt. F. D. Benson, Coldstream Guards
- L./Sgt. A. Berry, Yorkshire Light Infantry
- Pte. C. H. Bettesworth, Coldstream Guards
- Gunner A. Bickley, Royal Garrison Artillery
- Sgt. W. Biddle, Gloucestershire Regiment
- Sgt. C. Bignell, Oxfordshire and Buckinghamshire Light Infantry
- Pte. W. I. D. Bishop, Devon Regiment
- Sapper J. Black, Royal Engineers
- Pte. T.S. Blackbird, Yorkshire and Lancashire Regiment
- L./C. W. Blackburn, Northumberland Fusiliers
- Sgt. W. Blackley, Highland Light Infantry
- Sgt. E. D. Blackman, London Regiment
- Pte. H. Blackwell, King's Royal Rifle Corps
- Cpl. R. Bland, Royal Engineers
- Cpl. G. Bliss, 20th Hussars
- Pte. J. Blower, Shropshire Light Infantry
- Sgt. J. Blud, 1st Bn., Shropshire Light Infantry
- Sgt. H. Boam, Royal Engineers
- Sapper. T. Bogle, Royal Engineers
- L./Sgt. C. A. Bonar, Welsh Guards
- Pte. G. Bond, Northumberland Fusiliers
- L./Sgt. H. Boneham, Coldstream Guards
- L./C. H. F. H. Boon, Scots Guards
- Sgt. B. Bourne, Yorkshire Light Infantry
- L./C. H. T. Boyden, Middlesex Regiment
- Pte. J. Boyle, Scots Guards
- L./C. C. H. Bradford, Special Reserve
- Pte. A. Bradley, East Kent Regiment
- Pte. R. Bradshaw, East Yorkshire Regiment
- Cpl. (Acting Sgt.) S. Braithwaite, Yorkshire Regiment.
- Pte. J. Brammer, North Staffordshire Regiment
- Pte. A. W. Branch, King's Royal Rifle Corps
- Pte. M. Brannan, Yorkshire and Lancashire Regiment.
- Cpl. T. Brayshaw, Royal Field Artillery
- Sgt. J. Brennan, Irish Guards
- Bombardier S. J. Brennan, Royal Garrison Artillery
- Cpl. J. Brewin, Leicestershire Regiment
- L./Sgt. G. H. Brittain, South Staffordshire Regiment
- Sgt. A. C. Brixey, Royal Horse Artillery
- L./Cpl. W. C. Brodie, Royal Warwickshire Regiment
- Pte. J. Brodrick, Royal Scots Fusiliers
- Cpl. W. Brome, Royal Field Artillery
- Acting Bombardier J. Brook, Royal Field Artillery
- Pte. G. W. Brookes, Shropshire Light Infantry
- Sgt. F. H. Brooks, Royal Engineers
- L./Sgt. W. F. Brooks, Worcestershire Regiment
- Sgt. W. Broughton, West Yorkshire Regiment
- Pte. A. Brown, Liverpool Regiment
- Pte. F. Brown, West Yorkshire Regiment
- Pte. G. Brown, Middlesex Regiment
- Pte. W. H. Brown, Devon Regiment
- Pte. W. H. Brown, Royal Highlanders
- Sgt. A. E. Bryant, Royal West Surrey Regiment
- Pte. J.Buchanan, Royal Highlanders
- Sgt. C. J. Buckley, Lincolnshire Regiment
- Gunner H. Buckley, Royal Field Artillery
- Bombardier. A. E. Bull, Royal Field Artillery
- Sgt. S. Bull, Royal Flying Corps
- Flight Sgt. (Acting Sgt-Maj.) H. C. S. Bullock, Royal Flying Corps
- Cpl. H. T. Bunn, Middlesex Regiment
- Pte. A.A. Burgess, Rifle Brigade
- Sgt. A.J. Burke, Liverpool Regiment
- Acting Sgt. W. Burke, Grenadier Guards
- Cpl. T. Burnett, Royal Field Artillery
- L./C. (Acting 2nd Cpl.) C. J. Burrage, Royal Engineers
- Sgt. (Acting Sgt-Maj.) W. G. Burt, Royal Artillery
- Sgt. D. Burton, Army Service Corps
- Sapper. G. F. Burton, Royal Engineers
- 2nd Cpl. H. Buttery, Royal Engineers
- L./C. J. Buzzard, East Kent Regiment
- Pte. F. Bydawell, Machine Gun Corps, late Shropshire Light Infantry
- L./Sjt. W. H. Byrom, Cheshire Regiment
- Pte. G. Cable, South Wales Borderers
- Sgt. T. L. Cahill, Irish Guards
- Sgt. F. Calder, Royal Engineers
- Pte. G.Callan, King's Royal Rifle Corps
- Cpl. H. Cameron, Cameron Highlanders
- Pte. H. Cameron, Argyll and Sutherland Highlanders
- Bugler T. G. Cameron, Durham Light Infantry
- Sgt. D. Campbell, King's Own Scottish Borderers
- L./C. J. Campbell, Argyll and Sutherland Highlanders
- Drummer J. Campbell, Argyll and Sutherland Highlanders
- Gunner E. W. Camping, Royal Horse Artillery
- Cpl. C. Carr, Royal Field Artillery
- Sapper H. Carr, Royal Engineers
- Gunner W. Carr, Royal Field Artillery
- Pte. M. Carroll, Royal Munster Fusiliers
- Pte. W. Carter, West Riding Regiment
- Pte. G. Casey, Worcestershire Regiment
- Sjt. E. Catling, Yorkshire Regiment
- Pte. A. Chalmers, Argyll and Sutherland Highlanders
- Pte. E. Chambers, West Yorkshire Regiment
- Gunner T. Chambers, Royal Garrison Artillery
- L/C. A.W. Chaplin, Royal Inniskilling Fusiliers
- Sgt. D. W. Chapman, Grenadier Guards
- Pte. W. Chard, Scots Guards
- Pte. E. Charlton, Durham Light Infantry
- L./C. A.E. Charman, London Regiment
- L./C. B. Chipchase, Northumberland Fusiliers
- Pte. W. Church, Shropshire Light Infantry
- Driver T. Churchill, Royal Field Artillery
- Acting Sgt. W. B. Churchman, Royal Engineers
- Pte. C.J. Claridge, Gloucestershire Regiment
- Pte. A. F. Clark, Durham Light Infantry
- Pte. T.F. Clark, Yorkshire Light Infantry
- Sapper (Acting Sgt.) S. Clark, Royal Engineers
- L./C. W. Clark, Machine Gun Corps, late West Yorkshire Regiment
- Sgt. (Acting Staff Sgt-Maj.) W. J. Clark, Army Service Corps
- Pte. W. S. Clark, London Regiment
- Pte. A. Clarke, West Yorkshire Regiment
- Cpl. F. Clarke, Yorkshire Light Infantry
- L./C. F. C. Clarke, London Regiment
- Bombardier. G. C. Clarke, Royal Field Artillery
- Pte. J. Clarke, South Lancashire Regiment
- Pte. J. Clarkson, Grenadier Guards
- Cpl. T. Clayton, Irish Guards
- B.Q.M.S. C. W. Cleaver, Royal Field Artillery
- L./Sgt. S. Clegg, Manchester Regiment
- L./C. W. V. Clements, 2nd Dragoon Guards
- Cpl. J. Cochrane, Argyll and Sutherland Highlanders
- Cpl. (Acting Mechanist Sgt.-Maj.) T. Cochrane, Army Service Corps
- 2nd Cpl. E. Coldman, Royal Engineers
- Cpl. G. W. Cole, Royal Engineers
- Pte. A. Coles, Welsh Regiment
- Sgt. F. Coles, Royal Engineers
- Pte. S. Coles, Dorset Regiment
- Pte. G. Colgan, Royal Inniskilling Fusiliers
- Gunner G. B. Collard, Royal Field Artillery
- Gunner G. Collins, Royal Garrison Artillery
- L./C. R. Collins, Norfolk Regiment
- Sapper E.A. Collis, Royal Engineers
- Sgt. W.H. Collis, Royal Engineers
- L./C. A. E. Collison, Coldstream Guards
- Acting. Bombardier W.H. Coltman, Royal Field Artillery
- Cpl. W. H. Comery, Nottinghamshire and Derbyshire Regiment
- Cpl. R. Connor, Highland Light Infantry
- 16224 Pte. G. Constable, Royal Army Medical Corps
- Pte. A. E. Constant, Welsh Regiment
- L./C. E. Cook, Royal Engineers
- Company Q.M.S. W. R. Cook, South Wales Borderers
- Sgt. S. Cooke, Grenadier Guards
- Sgt. C. J. H. Cooper, Royal Engineers
- Pte. J. W. Cooper, West Yorkshire Regiment
- Cpl. W. S. Cooper, Grenadier Guards
- L./C. C. Corbett, Royal Scots
- Pte. J. Corcoran, Grenadier Guards
- Gunner J. Coulson, Royal Field Artillery
- Cpl. A. Coulter, Royal Scots Fusiliers
- Sgt. S. H. Covell, Royal Lancashire Regiment
- Pte. A. Covill, Suffolk Regiment
- Sgt. J. Cowan, Liverpool Regiment
- Sgt. T. Cowan, Scottish Rifles
- Acting Bombardier H. C. Coward, Royal Garrison Artillery
- Gunner J. Cowgill, Royal Field Artillery
- Sgt. J. Cowie, 3rd Coy. Royal Munster Fusiliers.
- Pte. J. Cox, Grenadier Guards
- Pte. P. H. Cox, London Regiment
- Pte. S.Cox, Bedfordshire Regiment
- Acting Bombardier J.F.B.Craig, Royal Field Artillery
- Sapper W. Crank, Royal Engineers
- Pte. R. Crate, Royal Scots Fusiliers
- 2nd Cpl. C. P. Creek, Royal Engineers
- Sgt. J. H. Cribbin, Liverpool Regiment
- Acting Sgt. W. Croghan, Royal Field Artillery
- Cpl. E. Croll, Nottinghamshire and Derbyshire Regiment
- Pte. W. G. Crossley, London Regiment
- Pte. W. F. Crowe, Liverpool Regiment
- L./C. A. Cullen, East Kent Regiment
- Pte. J. Culnane, Army Service Corps
- Pte. B. Cundy, Essex Regiment
- Pte. J. H. Curtis, Nottinghamshire and Derbyshire Regiment
- Sgt.(Acting Company Sgt-Maj.) J. H. Dale, Royal Irish Rifles
- Gunner J. Daly, Royal Garrison Artillery
- Gunner T. N. Darville, Royal Field Artillery
- Bombardier W. J. Davey, Royal Field Artillery
- Acting Bombardier D. Davies, Royal Field Artillery
- Sgt. J. Davies, Welsh Regiment
- Cpl. J. J. Davies, Royal Army Medical Corps
- Pte. S. V. Davies, King's Royal Rifle Corps
- Sgt. H. G. Davis, Royal Engineers
- Cpl. (Acting Sgt.) S. J. Davis, Royal Engineers
- Sgt. C. Davison, Royal Garrison Artillery
- L./C. A. Day, Northumberland Fusiliers
- Sgt. G. A. Day, Mounted Military Police
- Acting Company Q.M.S. J. Day, Royal Scots
- Sgt. W. T. Day, Royal Garrison Artillery.
- Gunner E. E. Deacy, Royal Field Artillery
- Sgt. A. Dearman, Yorkshire Regiment
- Cpl. P. E. DeCarteret, Royal Field Artillery
- Pte. J. Delaney, Royal Fusiliers
- L./C. J. Dempsey, 5th Lancers
- Pte. A. C. Dempster, Royal Irish Rifles
- Gunner H. Denmark, Royal Garrison Artillery
- L./C.T. Dennehy, Royal Munster Fusiliers
- Sgt. A. H. Dennis, King's Royal Rifle Corps
- Cpl. F. W. Denton, London Regiment
- Acting Sgt. A. Dewar, Royal Highlanders
- Sgt. C. Dickie, Gordon Highlanders
- L./C. (Acting Cpl.) H. Digby, Essex Regiment
- Sgt. T. Dillon, Somerset Light Infantry
- Acting Bombardier. B. Divver, Royal Field Artillery
- Pte. J. Dixon, Coldstream Guards
- Cpl. K. Dobie, Gordon Highlanders
- Cpl. G. Dobson, West Yorkshire Regiment
- L./Sgt. H. Dobson, Royal Lancashire Regiment
- Pte. R. J. Docking, Grenadier Guards
- Pte. T. Dodd, South Lancashire Regiment
- Sgt. W.R.Dodd, Yorkshire and Lancashire Regiment.
- L./C. J. Dodds, Royal Scots Fusiliers
- Acting. Sgt. R. N. Dodds, Royal Engineers
- Sapper D. T. Dolby, Royal Engineers
- Sgt. J. Donaldson, East Lancashire Regiment
- Gunner J. J. Donoghue, Royal Garrison Artillery
- Pte. W. Doody, Shropshire Light Infantry
- Gunner J. Doran, Royal Field Artillery
- Staff Q.M.S. F. W. Dorling, Army Service Corps
- L./C. W. Dove, West Yorkshire Regiment
- Sgt. W. Dowding, Durham Light Infantry
- Sgt. G..W. F. H. Downer, Royal Horse Artillery
- Pt. I. Downes, Royal Welch Fusiliers
- Pte. E. Dowsing, Royal West Kent Regiment
- Pte. F. Drage, Cambridgeshire Regiment
- Cpl. F. Dress, Royal Army Medical Corps
- Sgt. W. Duckett, Royal Engineers
- Sgt. P. Duffy, West Yorkshire Regiment
- Cpl. C. J. Duggins, Royal West Surrey Regiment
- Sapper F. Dundas, Royal Engineers
- Pte. G. H. Dunstone, Royal Army Medical Corps
- Sgt. J. A. Dutton, Royal Inniskilling Fusiliers
- Sapper J. H. Dyke, Royal Engineers
- Cpl. J. J. Earp, Royal Field Artillery
- Pte. T. Easey, Suffolk Regiment
- L./C. J. East, Royal West Kent Regiment
- Sgt. R. Eastham, Royal Army Medical Corps
- Sgt. G. Easton, Highland Light Infantry
- Trumpeter H. Eddington, Royal Field Artillery
- Sgt. J. Edmonds, Somerset Light Infantry
- L./C. A. H. Edwards, South Staffordshire Regiment
- Sgt. C. J. Edwards, Royal Garrison Artillery
- Sgt. J. Edwards, Seaforth Highlanders
- Gunner (Acting Bombardier) J. Edwards, Royal Garrison Artillery
- Sgt. W. D. Edwards, Rifle Brigade
- Sgt. M. Elderkin, Royal West Surrey Regiment
- Acting. Sgt. J. H. Elliott, West Yorkshire Regiment
- Sgt. T. Elliott, 1st Royal Dragoons
- Sgt. E. Ellis, Yorkshire Light Infantry
- Pte. E. Ellis, Yorkshire Light Infantry
- Sgt. F. Ellis, Royal Engineers
- Cpl. W. Ellis, Royal Field Artillery
- Pte. W. S. Ellison, Royal Welch Fusiliers
- Sgt. P. M. Elton, Royal Engineers
- Acting. Bombardier G. P. Emery, Royal Garrison Artillery
- Sgt. J. R. Ennion, Suffolk Regiment
- Gunner D. Evans, Royal Garrison Artillery
- L./Sgt. D. J. Evans, South Lancashire Regiment
- Acting Sgt. G. P. Evans, Royal Monmouthshire Royal Engineers
- Pte. H. E. Evans, South Wales Borderers
- L./C. T. W. Evans, Border Regiment
- L./Sgt. W. O. Evans, Royal Welch Fusiliers
- Pte. F. G. Everett, Norfolk Regiment
- Sgt. C. W. Everiss, Worcestershire Regiment
- Pte. W. J. Facer, Suffolk Regiment
- Pte. F. J. Farmer, Royal Warwickshire Regiment
- 2nd Class Air Mechanic H. N. Farmer, Royal Flying Corps
- L./C. P. Farrell, Royal Inniskilling Fusiliers
- Sapper T. Farrelly, Royal Engineers
- Sgt. F. J. Fawcett, Royal Engineers
- Pte. M. Fay, Lancashire Fusiliers
- Pte. W. Feast, Royal West Kent Regiment.
- Cpl. W. E. Feldwick, Motor Machine Gun Service
- Cpl. R. Fellows, York and Lancaster Regiment
- Pte. H. E. Felsted, Royal Army Medical Corps
- Pte. F. Fensome, Royal Army Medical Corps
- Pte. E. Fenton, Grenadier Guards
- Sgt. J. Ferguson, Royal Field Artillery
- Pte. B. L. Ferris, London Regiment
- Pte. (Acting Cpl.) T. F. Fido, Rifle Brigade
- Spr. A. Fields, Royal Anglesey Royal Engineers
- L./C. R. A. Filer, Royal Army Medical Corps
- Pte. G. A. Finch, Middlesex Regiment
- Pte. W. Finch, Hampshire Regiment
- Sgt. G. W. Finlay, Gordon Highlanders
- Bombardier R. Finlayson, Royal Field Artillery
- Gunner J. P. Firth, Royal Field Artillery
- Sgt. P. J. Fisher, Cheshire Regiment
- L./C. W. Fisher, Middlesex Regiment
- Gunner (Acting Bombardier) W. L. Fisher, Royal Field Artillery
- L./C. C. B. Fitch, Northamptonshire Regiment
- Sgt. P. Fleming, Cameron Highlanders.
- Sapper R. Fletcher, Royal Engineers
- L./C. J. Flowers, West Yorkshire Regiment
- Sgt. F. H. Floyd, Royal Engineers
- Sgt. J. Foley, Shropshire Light Infantry
- Sgt. J. Forshaw, Royal Anglesey Royal Engineers
- Sapper (Acting L./C.) F. C. Fovargue, Royal Engineers
- Pte. R. Fowler, Border Regiment
- Pte. F. Fox, East Surrey Regiment
- Sgt. W. S. Fox, Royal Anglesey Royal Engineers
- Acting. Sgt. W. G. Frampton, Royal Field Artillery
- Acting. Sgt. J. France, Northumberland Fusiliers
- Pte. D. Frank, Argyll and Sutherland Highlanders
- Sgt. A. Fraser, Highland Light Infantry
- Bombardier A. S. Fraser, Royal Field Artillery
- Sgt. H. Fraser, Seaforth Highlanders
- Pte. J. Fraser, Royal Army Medical Corps
- Cpl. H. Fredman, Royal Field Artillery
- Sgt. J. J. Freeman, South Wales Borderers
- L./Sgt. J. S. Freeman, Northumberland Fusiliers
- Cpl. J. French, King's Royal Rifle Company
- Cpl. W. Frey, London Regiment
- Acting Bombardier T. G. Fripp, Royal Field Artillery
- Bombardier R.W.Frith, Royal Field Artillery
- Cpl. T. P. Fry, London Regiment
- Pte. T. J. Fulbrig, Royal Inniskilling Fusiliers
- Cpl. A. Furnell, Wiltshire Regiment
- Acting Bombardier J. Furnival, Royal Field Artillery
- Company Q.M.S. S. Furzer, Border Regiment
- Pte. P. W. Fussell, Liverpool Regiment
- Sgt. G. Gardener, Durham Light Infantry
- Sgt. W. Gardner, Royal Lancashire Regiment
- Pte. G. Garvin, Royal Inniskilling Fusiliers
- Pte. W. A. Gatenby, West Yorkshire Regiment
- Pte. E. D. Gates, Coldstream Guards
- Sgt. E. J. Gibbs, Welsh Guards
- L./C. F. W. Gibson, London Regiment
- Pte. E. F. Giles, Rifle Brigade
- Pte. G.F. Gill, Royal West Surrey Regiment
- Cpl. W. Gillin, Northumberland Fusiliers
- Pte. E. Gisby, Border Regiment
- Cpl. M. Glancy, Leinster Regiment
- Staff Q.M.S (Acting Staff Sgt-Maj.) M. Glavey, Army Service Corps
- Pte. A. Godfrey, Northamptonshire Regiment
- Pte. J. Golding, Shropshire Light Infantry
- Sgt. J. Goldthorpe, Royal West Surrey Regiment
- L./Sgt. B. C. Goodchild, Suffolk Regiment
- Sgt. J. Gordon, Royal Anglesey Royal Engineers
- Cpl. G. Gosling, Royal Engineers
- Cpl. D. Graham, Royal Field Artillery
- L./Sgt. J..Graham, 2nd Dragoons
- Sgt. G. H. Grant, Essex Regiment
- Cpl. A. Grattan, Royal Garrison Artillery
- Pte. A. Gray, York and Lancaster Regiment
- 2nd Class Air Mechanic A. J. Greatorex, Royal Flying Corps
- Sapper E. Green, Royal Engineers
- Pte. J. Green, South Staffordshire Regiment
- Pte. D. Greens, Northumberland Fusiliers
- Cpl. H. P. Greenwood, Special Reserve
- Sgt. G. S. Gregory, Hertfordshire Regiment
- Pioneer M. L. Greig, Royal Engineers
- L./C. D. Grierson, Royal Highlanders
- Sgt. L. B. Griffin, Oxfordshire & Buckinghamshire Light Infantry
- Sgt. A. F. Grimble, Yorkshire Regiment
- Cpl. A. H. Grimmitt, Royal Army Medical Corps
- Pte. H. W. Grimwade, Essex Regiment
- L./C. B. Grizell, 1st Dragoons
- L./C. J. Gunn, Royal Inniskilling Fusiliers
- Pte. T. Gutherie, Scots Guards
- Gunner J. Hague, Royal Field Artillery
- L./C. C. H. Hales, London Regiment
- Pte. C. S. Hall, East Kent Regiment
- Sgt. H. L. Hall, King's Royal Rifle Corps
- Pte. J. E. Hall, Duke of Cornwall Light Infantry
- Gunner J. W. Hall, Royal Field Artillery
- Pte. W. J. Hall, Royal Army Medical Corps
- Pte. J. Halleron, York and Lancaster Regiment
- Sgt. B.. J. Halliday, Lincolnshire Regiment
- Cpl. F. Halliday, East Surrey Regiment
- Sgt. D. Hallinan, Dorset Regiment
- Pte. C. Hambling, West Yorkshire Regiment
- Sgt. D. Hamilton, King's Own Scottish Borderers
- Sgt. W. E. Hampe, Lincolnshire Regiment
- Sgt. H. W. Hamshaw, Worcestershire Regiment
- Pte. S. F. Hancock, Gloucestershire Regiment
- Cpl. H. F. Hancocks, Northumberland Fusiliers
- Cpl. (Acting Sgt.) T. P. Hands, Royal Warwickshire Regiment
- L./C. W. C. Hands, London Regiment
- Cpl. A. K. Handy, Royal Field Artillery
- Pte. D. T. Hanford, Rifle Brigade
- Cpl. T. O. Hann, Durham Light Infantry
- L./Sgt. J. Happell, Highland Light Infantry
- Pte. T. W. Hardcastle, Northumberland Fusiliers
- Acting Sgt. J. Harding, 4th Dragoons Guards
- L./C. J. H. Harding, Royal West Surrey Regiment
- Cpl. T. P. Hardman, Royal Scots Fusiliers.
- Cpl. A. Hardy, Nottinghamshire and Derbyshire Regiment
- Sgt. (Acting Company Sgt-Maj) R.R Hare, Liverpool Regiment
- L./C. S. Hargreaves, King's Own Scottish Borderers
- Cpl. A. J. Harrington, Worcestershire Regiment
- Pte. A. V. Harris, King's Royal Rifle Corps
- Sapper C. Harris, Royal Engineers
- Cpl. W. Harris, Leicestershire Regiment
- Pte. W. H. Harris, London Regiment
- Pte. T. J. Harrison, Royal Irish Rifles
- Pte. W. G. Harrison, Yorkshire Regiment
- 2nd Cpl. (Acting Cpl.) H. C. Hart, Royal Engineers
- Sgt. H. Hartley, West Riding Regiment
- Cpl. R. Hartley, West Riding Regiment
- L./C. J. B. Hartnup, Royal West Surrey Regiment
- Cpl. L. Haslett, Royal Inniskilling Fusiliers
- L./C. H. Hastings, East Surrey Regiment
- Pte. G. F. Hawkins, Royal Fusiliers
- Pte. H. Hawkins, 12th Lancers
- Pte. P. Hayes, North Staffordshire Regiment
- Cpl. S. Hayter, Rifle Brigade
- Sgt. J. H. A. Hayward, Royal Engineers
- L./C. W. Hazell, Royal Warwickshire Regiment
- Sgt D. T. Hazlehurst, York and Lancaster Regiment
- Pte. W. Heafield, York and Lancaster Regiment
- Pte. P. Heath, Yorkshire Light Infantry
- Cpl. F. A. Hedley, 40th Divisional Artillery
- L./C. (Acting Staff Sgt.) A. S. Henderson, Army Veterinary Corps
- Pte. B. Hendry, Highland Light Infantry
- Pte. W. Henry, Nottinghamshire and Derbyshire Regiment
- Sgt. H. E. Henson, Yorkshire Light Infantry
- Pte. C. Herring, Shropshire Light Infantry
- Pte. H. Herring, Middlesex Regiment
- Pte. B. W. Hewitt, Army Service Corps
- L./C. J. Hewitt, Leicestershire Regiment
- Pte. P. Hext, Royal Welch Fusiliers
- Sgt. C. Heywood, South Lancashire Regiment
- Sgt. F. H. C. Hickman, London Regiment
- Sgt. W. T. Hicks, Grenadier Guards
- L./C. M. Higgins, Irish Guards
- Bombardier T. H. Hill, Royal Garrison Artillery
- Sapper H. W. Hills, Royal Engineers
- Sgt. G. Hilton, Cameron Highlanders
- Sgt. J.F.Hind, Royal Army Medical Corps
- L./C. A. Hinett, Nottinghamshire and Derbyshire Regiment
- Driver C. Hinsley, Royal Field Artillery
- Cpl. J. H. Hinvest, 1st Dragoon Guards
- Pte. W. C. Histed, East Kent Regiment
- Cpl. G. Hodder, Royal Field Artillery
- Cpl. R. Hodgkinson, West Riding Regiment
- Pte. G. H. Hodgson, West Yorkshire Regiment
- Cpl. W. Hofman, Middlesex Regiment
- Pte. A. Hogarth, Northumberland Fusiliers
- Drummer H. Hogwood, London Regiment
- Sgt. W. M. Holden, Liverpool Regiment
- Pioneer A. Holiday, Royal Engineers
- Pte. G. Hollinrake, Royal Lancashire Regiment
- 2nd Cpl. F. J. Holman, Royal Engineers
- L./C. D. Holmes, Worcestershire Regiment
- Pte. S. Holmes, Yorkshire Regiment
- Pte. (Acting L./C.) H. A. Holt, Royal Army Medical Corps
- Sgt. C. W. Hood, Yorkshire Light Infantry
- L./C. (Acting 2nd Cpl.) H. Hood, Royal Engineers
- Pte. J. Hopcraft, Royal Fusiliers
- L./C. A. Horcroft, Royal Sussex Regiment
- L./Sgt. J. Hordern, Special Reserve
- L./Sgt. T. Horlock, Machine Gun Service
- Sgt. E. M. Horner, Royal Engineers
- Pte. (Acting Sgt.) G. Horsley, Army Service Corps
- Sgt. H. Houghton, London Regiment
- L./C. E. Houston, Royal Scots
- Acting Sgt. A.R.Howard, Royal Field Artillery
- L./C. H. Howard, Northamptonshire Regiment
- Acting Sgt. W. M. Howard, Royal Field Artillery
- Sgt. (Acting Staff Sgt-Maj.) E. V. Howes, Army Service Corps
- L./Sgt. J. Howley, West Yorkshire Regiment
- Pte. J. Hoy, Suffolk Regiment
- Pte. F. Hughes, Royal Sussex Regiment
- Bombardier P. Hughes, Royal Field Artillery
- Pte. W. Hull, South Lancashire Regiment
- Acting Company Sgt-Maj. F. Hullott, Lincolnshire Regiment
- Sgt. A. M. Humphreys, Royal Engineers
- Pte. H.J. Humphries, Gloucestershire Regiment
- 2nd Cpl. (Acting Cpl.) J. Hunter, Royal Engineers
- Gunner J. H. Huntley, Royal Field Artillery
- Pte. W. Huntriss, Royal Lancashire Regiment
- Cpl. H. Hurd, Royal Garrison Artillery
- Sgt. E. W. Hurst, Royal Engineers
- Pte. A. Huson, London Regiment
- L./C. P. Hussey, Northamptonshire Regiment
- Cpl. J. Hutcheson, Scottish Rifles
- Acting. 2nd Cpl. R. Hutchinson, Royal Engineers
- L./C. A. C. Ingamells, Lincolnshire Regiment
- Sgt. P. Inman, York and Lancaster Regiment
- Sgt. H. Irle, Royal Field Artillery
- Pte. G. Ironmonger, Grenadier Guards
- Sgt. G. Irving, Manchester Regiment
- Pte. R. Irwin, Royal Inniskilling Fusiliers
- Cpl. C. Iveson, Northumberland Fusiliers
- L./C. A. Jackson, Nottinghamshire and Derbyshire Regiment
- Pte. E. B. Jackson, Royal Fusiliers
- Gunner G. W. Jackson, Royal Garrison Artillery
- L./C. J. T. Jackson, Northamptonshire Regiment
- Sgt. S. Jackson, Manchester Regiment
- Pte. A. M. Jaffray, Gordon Highlanders
- Flight Sgt. (Acting Sgt-Maj.) H. James, Royal Flying Corps
- Gunner J. R. Jarman, Royal Field Artillery
- Cpl. A. Jarvis, Royal Engineers
- Gunner E. Jeffery, Royal Horse Artillery
- Bombardier E. G. Jenkins, Royal Field Artillery
- Gunner J. Jenkins, Royal Garrison Artillery
- L./C. B. J. Jenks, Lincolnshire Regiment
- L./C. P. Jennings, Oxfordshire and Buckinghamshire Light Infantry
- Pte. G. W. Jenrick, East Kent Regiment
- Sgt. N. Jensen, Royal Engineers
- Sgt. F. Johnson, Nottinghamshire and Derbyshire Regiment
- Pte. F. Johnson, West Riding Regiment
- Pte. G. Johnson, Royal Army Medical Corps
- Pte. J. Johnston, Middlesex Regiment
- Pte. R. Johnstone, Manchester Regiment
- Sgt. C. Jones, King's Own Scottish Borderers
- Sgt. D. A. Jones, Welch Regiment
- Sgt. G. P. Jones, Royal Welch Fusiliers
- Sapper J. Jones, Royal Anglesey Royal Engineers
- Flight Sgt. (Acting Sgt-Maj.) J. C. Jones, Royal Flying Corps
- Cpl. J. R. Jones, Somerset Light Infantry
- Sgt. R. Jones, Royal Welch Fusiliers
- L./C. S. Jones, Welsh Regiment
- Sgt. W.J. Jones, Royal Engineers
- Cpl. A. H. S. Joyce, Bedfordshire Regiment
- Sapper H. Kandes, Royal Engineers
- Flight Sgt. (Acting Sgt/Maj.) M. Keegan, Royal Flying Corps
- Pte. D. Kelleher, Irish Guards
- Cpl. E. E. Kelly, Royal Garrison Artillery
- Pte. J. E. Kelly, Royal Warwickshire Regiment
- Gunner T. Kelly, Royal Field Artillery
- Gunner A. R. Kelsey, Royal Field Artillery
- Sgt. C. Kemp, Royal West Surrey Regiment
- Gunner D. Kempner, Royal Field Artillery
- Sgt. R. Kendall, Welsh Regiment
- Pte. T. Kenny, North Staffordshire Regiment
- Pte. W. Kent, King's Royal Rifle Company
- L./C. J. Kenyon, East Surrey Regiment
- Sgt. H. W. Kernott, Royal Fusiliers
- Cpl. T. W. Keskeys, Royal Engineers
- Gunner A. C. Kidd, Royal Field Artillery
- Cpl. (Acting Sgt.) A. King, Shropshire Light Infantry
- Sgt. J. P. King, Bedfordshire Regiment
- Bombardier P. J. King, Royal Field Artillery
- Pte. W. Kingsford, East Kent Regiment
- Pte. A. A. Kirchin, Leicestershire Regiment
- Cpl. W. E. Kisby, Royal Scots
- L./C. H. Knight, Royal Army Medical Corps
- Pte. R. W. Knight, Rifle Brigade
- L./C. J. T. Knott, Leicestershire Regiment
- Engh. Clerk Q.M.S. W. Knott, Royal Engineers
- Sgt. J. Knowles, Nottinghamshire and Derbyshire Regiment
- Sgt. T. Knox, Northumberland Fusiliers
- L./.C. W. H. Lacey, Nottinghamshire and Derbyshire Regiment
- L./C. A. Lancaster, Bedfordshire Regiment
- 4409 Sgt. H. Lancaster, Royal Lancashire Regiment
- L./C. J. Lang, King's Royal Rifle Company
- Pte. F. Langdon, Royal Welch Fusiliers
- L./C. T. Langford, Royal Engineers
- Cpl. G. Larby, Royal Sussex Regiment
- Cpl. J. Larkman, King's Royal Rifle Company
- Pte. W. R. Laskey, Durham Light Infantry
- Sgt. R. J. Lawler, Suffolk Regiment
- L./C. (Acting Cpl.) P. Layton, Shropshire Light Infantry
- Pte. W Layton, Shropshire Light Infantry
- Cpl. W. W. Leach, Royal Engineers
- Pte. J. Leary, South Staffordshire Regiment
- Pte. T. Leatham, Royal Highlanders
- Pte. J. W. Ledger, York and Lancaster Regiment
- Cpl. C. Lee, Royal Field Artillery
- Pte. J.W. Lee, Lincolnshire Regiment
- Pte. F. Leiper, Highland Light Infantry
- Pte. T. Leslie, East Lancashire Regiment
- Pte. H. E. Lester, South Staffordshire Regiment
- Pte. F. Lewis, Cameron Highlanders
- Pte. F. Ling, Norfolk Regiment
- Gunner S. Lisle, Royal Field Artillery
- Pte. W. Lisney, Gloucestershire Regiment
- Flight Sgt. (Acting Sgt/Maj.) C. Littlejohn, Royal Flying Corps
- L./C. W. Livesey, Royal Lancaster Regiment
- Pte. B. Livett, Royal Berkshire Regiment
- Sgt. W. Lloyd, Worcestershire Regiment
- Pte. W. E. Lloyd, Royal Army Medical Corps
- Sgt. J. W. Lockwood, Royal Army Medical Corps
- 2nd Cpl. T. M. Logan, Royal Engineers
- Pte. C. L. Long, Essex Regiment
- Pte. C. Looney, Royal Munster Fusiliers
- Pte. F. H. Loring, Yorkshire Light Infantry
- Acting Company Sgt./Maj. G. Lovatt, Highland Light Infantry
- 2nd Cpl. (Acting Cpl.) W. R. Lovell, Royal Engineers
- Pte. W. A. Luck, Northamptonshire Regiment
- L./Sgt. W. Lunn, North Staffordshire Regiment
- L./C. A. MacBeath, Seaforth Highlanders
- Pte. D. Macintosh, Highland Light Infantry
- Pte. D. MacKay, Seaforth Highlanders
- Cpl. J. S. MacMurchie, Royal Highlanders
- L./C. F. G. Madeley, Grenadier Guards
- Sgt. A. J. Mackenzie, Royal Fusiliers
- Sapper D. Maclean, Royal Engineers
- L./C. S. J. Maclean, North Staffordshire Regiment
- Cpl. F. Mahan, Nottinghamshire and Derbyshire Regiment
- Cpl. P. Mahon, Leinster Regiment
- Sgt. J. Mahony, Royal Irish Fusiliers
- Pte. P. Mallea, Army Service Corps
- Staff Sgt. (Acting Staff Sgt./Maj.) F. C. Manley, Army Service Corps
- L./C. J. Mant, Royal Sussex Regiment
- Sgt. F. Markham, 18th Hussars
- Gunner W. Markham, Royal Field Artillery
- Gunner C. W. Marler, Royal Field Artillery
- Sgt. W. Marley, Royal Army Medical Corps
- Sgt. A. H. Marsh, Durham Light Infantry
- Sgt. J. Marshall, Royal Engineers
- Pte. J. Marston, Shropshire Light Infantry
- Pte. H. W. Martin, Middlesex Regiment
- L./Sgt. T. Martin, Nottinghamshire and Derbyshire Regiment
- L./C. W. E. Martin, Royal Sussex Regiment
- Acting Sgt. E. J. Marygold, Nottinghamshire and Derbyshire Regiment
- L./C. E. Mason, King's Royal Rifle Company
- Pte. L. Mason, East Kent Regiment
- Cpl. R. Mathieson, King's Own Scottish Borderers
- L./C. S. Matthews, Nottinghamshire and Derbyshire Regiment
- Sgt. J. H. Mattinson, Oxfordshire and Buckinghamshire Light Infantry
- Actin. Bombardier T. W. Mattox, Royal Field Artillery
- Gunner T. Mavin, Royal Garrison Artillery
- Sgt. J. C. May, London Regiment
- Sgt. H.V. May, Royal Engineers
- Gunner D. McAlden, Royal Field Artillery
- Pte. J. McAnary, Royal Inniskiling Fusiliers
- L./C. S. McBurnie, Depot, King's Own Scottish Borderers
- Cpl. D. McCarthy, Royal Garrison Artillery
- Cpl. G. McCarthy, Duke of Cornwall's Light Infantry
- Cpl. E. G. McCartney, Royal Garrison Artillery
- Sgt. F. C. McClelland, Royal Engineers
- 2nd Cpl. (Acting. Cpl.) W. J. McCoy, Royal Engineers
- Sgt. D. McCormack, Royal Munster Fusiliers
- Sgt. J. McCrae, Argyll & Sutherland Highlanders
- 2nd. Cpl. (Acting Cpl.) J. McCreath, Royal Engineers
- Sgt. J. McDermott, King's Own Scottish Borderers
- Sgt. J. T. McDonagh, Coldstream Guards
- Pte. A. McDonald, East Kent Regiment
- L./C. C. McDonald, Special Reserve
- Cpl. A. McEwan, Royal Field Artillery
- Cpl. A. McGough, Gordon Highlanders
- Gunner M. Mclnnes, Royal Field Artillery
- Pte. J. Mclntyre, Highland Light Infantry
- Pte. T. McKenna, Northumberland Fusiliers
- L./C. A. McLean, Royal Engineers
- 2nd Cpl. (Acting Cpl.) A. McLeod, Royal Engineers
- Pte. R. McNab, Seaforth Highlanders
- Pte. J. McPhail, Argyll and Sutherland Highlanders
- Pte. J. McQuade, Northumberland Fusiliers
- Pte. A. W. Mead, London Regiment
- Sgt. F. J. Mead, Royal Garrison Artillery
- L./C. J. Meadows, Essex Regiment
- Sgt. J. Millar, Royal Highlanders
- Staff Sgt. H. Miller, Royal Army Medical Corps
- Pte. W. Miller, South Lancashire Regiment
- Pte. F. Millett, London Regiment
- Sapper T. J. Millett, Royal Engineers
- L./C. J. F. Mills, London Regiment
- Farrier Staff Sgt. S. Mills, Indian Army
- Pte. W. C. Millward, South Wales Borderers
- L./C. A. Milnes, Coldstream Guards
- Sgt. J. Minnery, Argyll and Sutherland Highlanders
- Cpl. A. Mitchell, Royal Engineers
- Gunner A. Mitchell, Royal Field Artillery
- Gunner C. A. Mitchell, Royal Field Artillery
- Pte. G. Mitchell, York and Lancaster Regiment
- Sapper A. Moncho, Royal Engineers
- Cpl. (Acting Sgt.) W. Monteith, Royal Engineers
- Sgt. J. R. Moorhouse, King's Own Scottish Borderers
- Gunner W. Moreman, Royal Field Artillery
- Pte. W. J. Morgan, South Wales Borderers
- Acting Sgt. W. Morley, Duke of Cornwall's Light Infantry
- L./C. F. S. Morris, Royal Engineers
- Pte. H. Morris, Duke of Cornwall's Light Infantry
- L./C. G. Morris, 6th Bn., Northamptonshire Regiment
- Sgt. (Acting Battery Sgt-Maj.) W. H. Morris, Royal Field Artillery
- L./C. T. Morrisey, Leinster Regiment
- Sgt. A. C. Mousley, Royal Field Artillery
- Sgt. P. Moyles, Yorkshire Light Infantry
- Sgt. J. Muir, Scots Guards
- Pte. J. Muirhead, Scots Guards
- Driver A. Murgatroyd, Royal Field Artillery
- Pte. A. Murray, Shropshire Light Infantry
- Sgt. W. Murray, Royal Highlanders
- Pte. W. H. Murray, West Riding Regiment
- Acting Company Q.M.S. London Regiment
- L./C. W. Neale, Grenadier Guards
- L./C. R. Neilson, Scottish Rifles
- Acting Sgt. A. Nelson, Northumberland Fusiliers
- Sgt. E. Newman, Royal Engineers
- L./Sgt. J. Newman, London Regiment
- Pte. G. E. Newton, York and Lancaster Regiment
- Pte. A. Neville, Northamptonshire Regiment
- Pte. F. A. Newey, Royal Warwickshire Regiment
- Pte. T. Nisbett, Royal Lancaster Regiment
- Pte. G. A. M. Noble, Durham Light Infantry
- Cpl. W. P. Noel, Royal Field Artillery
- Sgt. M. Nolan, Royal Army Medical Corps
- Sgt. W. M. Nolan, Royal Field Artillery
- Cpl. J. Norcross, Royal Field Artillery
- L/C. J. R. Norman, North Staffordshire Regiment
- Acting Cpl. R; Norman, Northamptonshire Regiment
- Cpl. G. H. Norton, Suffolk Regiment
- Cpl. A. Nunn, Royal Engineers
- L./Sgt. G. Oakes, Nottinghamshire and Derbyshire Regiment
- L./C. J. O'Brien, Royal Dublin Fusiliers
- Cpl. M. O'Brien, Royal Munster Fusiliers
- L./C. P. O'Brien, Royal Dublin Fusiliers
- Pte. E. H. Obstfelder, Middlesex Regiment
- Pte. J. W. Offler, Royal Sussex Regiment
- Pte. J. O'Gorman, Royal Munster Fusiliers
- Cpl. H. M. O'Hare, Royal Field Artillery
- Pte. P. G. O'Keefe, 10th Hussars
- Sgt. D. O'Leary, King's Royal Rifle Company
- Sapper. W. Olner, Royal Engineers
- Pte. L. J. O'Mara, Royal West Surrey Regiment
- Sgt. A. Orange, West Yorkshire Regiment
- Pte. P. O'Reilly, King's Own Scottish Borderers
- Pte. (Acting L./C.) J. J. P. O'Rorke, Royal Munster Fusiliers
- L./Sgt. R. Orr, Royal Scottish Fusiliers
- Gunner R. T. Orsmond, Royal Garrison Artillery
- Q.M.S. (acting Staff Sgt/Maj.) F. A. Osborn, Royal Scots Fusiliers
- Gunner W. G. Osborne, Motor Machine-gun Service
- Bandsman A. V. Owen, Worcestershire Regiment
- L./C. W. Paddock, Royal Engineers
- Cpl. (Acting Sgt.) W. K. Palmer, Royal Engineers
- Sapper G. Park, Royal Engineers
- Cpl. J. F. Parker, Royal Garrison Artillery
- Pte. J. S. Parkinson, Liverpool Regiment
- Cpl. W. H. Parrett, Royal Garrison Artillery
- Cpl. A. E. Parrott, Royal Field Artillery
- Sgt. A. K. Paterson, Rifle Brigade
- Pte. L. Patterson, Royal Army Medical Corps
- Sgt. R. Paxton, Gordon Highlanders
- Cpl. of Horse C.H. Pay, 2nd Life Guards
- Acting Bombardier. G. Peacock, Royal Field Artillery
- Sapper S. Pearce, Royal Engineers
- Cpl. J. Peat, Royal Garrison Artillery
- Cpl. H. Pegg, Durham Light Infantry
- Pte. E. W. Penson, Royal Warwickshire Regiment
- Acting Cpl. O. J. Perry, Middlesex Regiment
- L./C. P. Perry, Essex Regiment
- L./Sgt. T. Phillipson, Cheshire Regiment
- Pte. J. Pickavance, South Lancashire Regiment
- Sapper J. Pickering, Royal Engineers
- Sgt. H. B. Pigott, Royal Field Artillery
- Pte. W. E. Pitney, 9th Lancers
- Cpl. T. A. Plant, King's Royal Rifle Company
- Sgt. A. Plunkett, Royal Engineers
- Sgt. H. Plunkett, London Regiment
- Sgt. H. Pobjoy, Royal Field Artillery
- Pte. E. A. Polin, Royal Welsh Fusiliers
- Staff Q.M.S. (Acting Staff Sgt/Maj.) T. Pollock, Army Service Corps
- Sgt. W. Pollock, Royal Engineers
- Pte. F. Poole, Gloucestershire Regiment
- Pte. (Acting Sgt.) F. Pope, Shropshire Regiment
- Sgt. E. Porter, East Yorkshire Regiment
- L /C. H. Porter, York and Lancaster Regiment
- 10724 Sgt. W. J. Porter, Royal Fusiliers
- Gunner (Acting Bombardier) J. L. Potter, Royal Field Artillery
- Pte. W. Pounceby, South Lancashire Regiment
- Pte. G. Powell, Monmouthshire Regiment
- L./S. E. Powis, West Riding Regiment
- Sgt. B. Pratten, South Wales Borderers
- Sgt. H. Price, Grenadier Guards
- Pte. N. Price, Royal Welch Fusiliers
- Acting Sgt. W. E. Price, Royal Field Artillery
- Q.M.S. W. C. Prince, Royal Army Medical Corps
- Sgt. H. Proctor, North Staffordshire Regiment
- Acting Sgt. D. Proudfoot, Royal Scots Fusiliers
- Pte. A. H. W. Pullen, Rifle Brigade
- Sgt. G. H. Pye, Royal Fusiliers
- Sgt. E. Quince, Bedfordshire Regiment
- Pte. P. Quinn, South Wales Borderers
- L./C. A. Raggett, King's Royal Rifle Company
- Pte. J. Railton, Northumberland Fusiliers
- L./C. A. Ramage, Highland Light Infantry
- Cpl. (Acting Sgt.) G. Rankin, Royal Engineers
- Pte. J.W. Ravenhill, Devon Regiment
- Cpl. (Acting Sgt.) T. Rayner, Middlesex Regiment
- Pte. P.Read, Leinster Regiment
- Cpl. E. L. Redman, London Regiment
- L./C. G. Reed, Essex Regiment
- Pte. H. V. Rees, Welsh Regiment
- Engineer Clerk Q.M.S. P. R. Regan, Royal Engineers
- Pte. P. C. Rex, Royal Dublin Fusiliers
- Sapper A. Reynolds, Royal Engineers
- Sgt. A. Rhoades, King's Royal Rifle Company
- Pte. J. R. Rice, South Wales Borderers
- Cpl. A. E. Richards, London Regiment
- Pte. G. H. Richards, Border Regiment
- Pte. J. Richardson, Northumberland Fusiliers
- Pte. T. Richardson, East Yorkshire Regiment
- Cpl. W. Richardson, London Regiment
- Sgt. H. Richmond, Royal Field Artillery
- L./C. W. Riddick, Manchester Regiment
- Pte. J. Rigby, Lancashire Regiment
- L./C. J. W. Rigby, Royal Monmouthshire Royal Engineers
- Pte. J. Rimmer, King's Own Scottish Borderers
- Cpl. A. Roabuck, Royal Irish Fusiliers
- Sgt. (Acting Sgt-Maj.) E. Roberts, Royal Welsh Fusiliers
- Gunner E. Roberts, Royal Garrison Artillery
- Sgt. J. W. Roberts, Royal Garrison Artillery
- Sgt. T. Roberts, Shropshire Light Infantry
- Pte. W. Roberts, North Staffordshire Regiment
- Acting Cpl. W. A. Roberts, Royal Field Artillery
- Pte. A. Robertson, Royal Scots Fusiliers
- L./C. E. Robins, Royal Engineers
- L./C. A. H. Robinson, Bedfordshire Regiment
- L./C. J. Robinson, Durham Light Infantry
- Sgt. A. H. Robson, Royal Army Medical Corps
- Cpl. F. F. Robson, Coldstream Guards
- Pte. W. J. Robson, Gordon Highlanders
- Pte. F. Rockett, East Yorkshire Regiment
- Sgt. H. R. M. Rodman, Royal Army Medical Corps
- Pte. P. Roe, Royal Dublin Fusiliers
- Pte. A. G. Rose, 3rd Hussars
- Pte. A. McK. Ross, Army Service Corps
- Pte. D. N. Ross, Cameron Highlanders
- L./C. F. Rosser, Royal Welsh Fusiliers
- Pte. J. Rourke, Northumberland Fusiliers
- Bombardier G. A. McL. Routledge, Royal Field Artillery
- Sgt. (Acting Staff Sgt-Maj.) F. Rowe, Army Service Corps
- Farrier Staff Sgt. W. Rowland, Royal Field Artillery
- Sgt. L. M. Rudge, Grenadier Guards
- Cpl. W. J. Rule, East Surrey Regiment
- Sgt. E. J. Runyeard, Royal Engineers
- Cpl. W. J. Rushforth, Royal Engineers
- Bombardier A. J. Russell, Royal Field Artillery
- L./Sgt. F. G. Russell, Bedfordshire Regiment
- Sapper (Acting L./C.) F. J. Russell, Royal Engineers
- Sapper T. Russell, Royal Engineers
- Sgt. A. M. Ruston, Northamptonshire Regiment
- Acting Bombardier J.W. Ryan, Royal Field Artillery
- Pte. W. Ryan, Leinster Regiment
- Bombardier. E. A. Sampson, Royal Field Artillery
- 3279 Gunner M. Samuels, Royal Garrison Artillery
- Sgt. F. C. Sanders, Shropshire Light Infantry
- Sgt. R. Sangster, Royal Scots
- Acting L./C. R. Saunders, Royal Engineers
- Gunner S. F. Saunders, Royal Garrison Artillery
- Sgt. F. G. Sawyer, Royal Field Artillery
- Cpl. C. Saysell, King's Royal Rifle Company
- Gunner W. Schofield, Royal Field Artillery
- L./Sgt. J. Scott, Seaforth Highlanders
- Pte. J. R. Scott, Royal Army Medical Corps
- Pte. T. N. G. Scott, Royal Army Medical Corps
- L./Sgt. D. Seath, Cameron Highlanders
- Bombardier T. Seddon, Royal Field Artillery
- L./Sgt. T. Seed, North Lancashire Regiment
- Pte. J. W. Sellars, Yorkshire Light Infantry
- Pte. H. Selvey, Border Regiment
- Pte. W. Shandley, Royal Army Medical Corps
- Acting Bombardier J. Shannon, Royal Horse Artillery
- Cpl. G. W. Shaw, Lincolnshire Regiment
- Sgt. J. Shaw, Northumberland Fusiliers
- Sgt. J. T. Shee, Royal Army Medical Corps
- Sgt. J. T. Shepherd, Royal Engineers
- Sgt. (Acting-Sgt-Maj.) J. B. Sherrington, Royal Garrison Artillery
- Pte. H. J. Shewan, Royal Highlanders
- Pte. S. Shone, Royal Highlanders
- Sgt. H. Short, East Yorkshire Regiment
- Pte. J. M. Showell, London Regiment
- Sgt. W. Shrubsole, Royal Garrison Artillery
- Sgt. (Acting Staff Sgt-Maj.) F. V. Sibbald, Army Service Corps
- Acting Bombardier E. Silver, Royal Field Artillery
- Cpl. W. A. Simmonds, Royal Fusiliers
- Actg. L./C. H. J. Simmons, Royal Army Medical Corps
- Pte. J. Simms, Royal Irish Rifles
- Pte. H. H. Simpson, Nottinghamshire and Derbyshire Regiment
- Pte. J. Simpson, Scots Guards
- Bombardier W. R. Simpson, Royal Field Artillery
- Pte. C. Sims, Royal Army Medical Corps
- L./C. C. H. Slade, Seaforth Highlanders
- Gunner J. Slater, Royal Field Artillery
- Sgt. P. Smart, Scots Guards
- Pte. T.M.Small, Royal Munster Fusiliers
- Pte. H. L. Smedley, London Regiment
- Sgt. G. Smewin, Oxfordshire and Buckinghamshire Light Infantry
- Sgt. A. Smith, Lancashire Fusiliers
- Sgt. A. E. Smith, Royal Garrison Artillery
- L./C. C. W. Smith, King's Royal Rifle Company
- Cpl. D. Smith, Seaforth Highlanders
- Pte. F. Smith, Leinster Regiment
- Sgt. G. Smith, Gordon Highlanders
- Cpl. G. D. Smith, East Yorkshire Regiment
- Staff Q.M.S. G. N. C. Smith, Army Service Corps
- Driver G.W. Smith, Royal Field Artillery
- Pte. H. Smith, Border Regiment
- Bombardier J. F. Smith, Royal Field Artillery
- Pte. J. W. Smith, Royal Scots
- Sgt. R. W. Smith, Royal Army Medical Corps
- Sgt. S. Smith, Norfolk Regiment
- Pte. T. Smith, Gordon Highlanders
- L./C. (Acting Sgt.) W. Smith, King's Royal Rifle Company
- Pte. W. Smith, Rifle Brigade
- Sgt. W. H. Smith, East Yorkshire Regiment
- Cpl. W. J. Smithers, Royal Engineers
- Sgt. G. Snell, Royal Horse Artillery
- Sgt. T. Sockett, Northumberland Fusiliers
- Sgt. F. J. Soper, Lincolnshire Regiment
- Pte. W. M. Soutar, Gordon Highlanders
- Armt. S./Sgt. (Actg. Armt. Sgt-Maj.) O. F. Sparey, Army Ordnance Corps
- Sgt. J. W. Spencer, London Regiment
- Cpl. R. Spencer, Royal Engineers
- Sgt. G. P. Spooner, London Regiment
- Sgt. W. E. Stanton, West Yorkshire Regiment
- Gunner H. C. Staunton, Royal Field Artillery
- Pte. A. W. D. Steele, Seaforth Highlanders
- Cpl. (Acting Sgt.) E. Stevens, Royal Fusiliers
- Sgt. G. Stevens, Lincolnshire Regiment
- Cpl. S. F. Stevens, Royal Fusiliers
- Pte. J. Stewart, Northumberland Fusiliers
- Gunner W. C. Stiff, Royal Field Artillery
- Sgt. G. Stinson, East Lancashire Regiment
- L./C. R. Stitt, King's Own Scottish Borderers
- Sgt. A. Stocking, London Regiment
- Sgt. W. H. Stockwell, Royal Welsh Fusiliers
- Drummer J. E. Stokes, Worcestershire Regiment
- Pte. W. J. Stonier, Coldstream Guards
- Sgt. A. Storry, Royal Engineers
- Gunner C. G. Street, Royal Garrison Artillery
- Pte. A. Stuart, South Lancashire Regiment
- Sgt T. R. Summerhayes, Somerset Light Infantry
- L./C. J. Summers, Royal Engineers
- Sgt. J. Summerville, Durham Light Infantry
- Bombardier T. S. Swain, Royal Garrison Artillery
- Pte. D. Swan, Royal Highlanders
- Sgt. W. H. Sweet, Mounted Military Police
- Sgt. J. Sykes, Yorkshire Light Infantry
- Pte. J. Taggart, Argyll and Sutherland Highlanders
- L./C. A. W. Taylor, Shropshire Light Infantry
- Sgt. G. Taylor, Grenadier Guards
- Pte. H. Taylor, Rifle Brigade
- Sgt. H. G. Taylor, Highland Light Infantry.
- Pte. L. Teal, Shropshire Light Infantry
- L./Sgt. G. Tedstill, Northumberland Fusiliers
- Cpl. F. Thackray, York and Lancaster Regiment
- Pte. E. Thomas, London Regiment
- Pte. G. A. Thomas, South Wals Borderers
- Sgt. H. J. Thomas, Grenadier Guards
- L./C. J. Thompson, Yorkshire Light Infantry
- Sgt. J. F. Thompson, London Regiment
- L./C. (Acting Cpl.) R. J. S. Thorpe-Tracey, London Regiment
- Cpl. P. J. Tickle, London Regiment
- Sgt. G. Tidd, Norfolk Regiment
- Bombardier G. W. Timmins, Royal Field Artillery
- Cpl. J. H. Timson, Royal Engineers
- Pte. W. Titt, Grenadier Guards
- Sgt. H. Todd, Argyll and Sutherland Highlanders
- Sgt J. Toomey, East Lancashire Regiment
- Cpl. E. Toon, Leicestershire Yeomanry
- Company Q.M.S. W. Tootill, South Wales Borderers
- Sgt. W. J. Trigg, East Kent Regiment
- Sgt. S. Tucker, London Regiment
- Driver W. Tull, Royal Field Artillery
- Pte. A. Turnbull, Liverpool Regiment
- Pte. A. E. Turner, East Surrey Regiment
- Pte. D. Turner, Border Regiment
- Sgt. H. J. Turner, Royal Berkshire Regiment
- Acting Bombardier J. W. Turton, Royal Field Artillery
- Sgt. J. W. Tutt, Royal Sussex Regiment
- Cpl. R. Twentymen, Northamptonshire Regiment
- L./Sgt. F. Twist, 3rd Dragoon Guards.
- Pte. P. Tyrrell, Royal Munster Fusiliers
- Pte. A. Underhill, Army Service Corps
- Sgt. M. J. Unwin, Nottinghamshire and Derbyshire Regiment
- Bombardier C. J. Uppington, Royal Field Artillery
- Drummer D. G. Urquhart, Royal Welsh Fusiliers
- L./Sgt. G. Urquhart, York and Lancaster Regiment
- 2nd Cpl. (Acting Cpl.) J. Vick, Royal Engineers
- Sgt. J. Viggers, East Kent Regiment
- L./C. A. Vincent, Royal Scots Fusiliers
- Sgt. J. Vincent, Royal Field Artillery
- L./C. T. W. Vincent, Oxfordshire and Buckinghamshire Light Infantry
- L./C. A. C. Wagstaff, Manchester Regiment
- Sgt. A. J. Walker, Middlesex Regiment
- Pte. (Acting Cpl.) B. Walker, Army Service Corps
- Pte. C. A. Walker, Royal Welsh Fusiliers
- Pte. J. Walker, Somerset Light Infantry
- Pte. P. T. Walker, Oxfordshire and Buckinghamshire Light Infantry
- Sgt. T. Walker, Royal Engineers
- Sgt. S. W. G. Walker, Duke of Cornwall's Light Infantry
- L./C. J. Wallace, Royal Highlanders
- Pte. J. Walsh, Royal Munster Fusiliers
- Sgt. (Acting Company Sgt-Maj.) J.W. Walter, Army Service Corps
- Sgt. S. G. Walters, Devon Regiment
- Cpl. (Acting Sgt.) A. J. Ward, Northamptonshire Regiment
- Acting Cpl. W. Ward, Rifle Brigade
- L./C. S. Warrick, Lincolnshire Regiment
- Bombardier W. J. Waters, Royal Field Artillery
- Pte. T. Watson, 2nd Dragoons
- Pte. T. Watson, Argyll and Sutherland Highlanders
- Flight Sgt. M. Weare, Royal Flying Corps
- Pte. P. Wearn, Wiltshire Regiment
- Driver W. D. Weaver, Royal Field Artillery
- Sgt. J. E. Webb, South Lancashire Regiment
- Pte. W. R. Webb, West Riding Regiment
- Sapper F. Webster, Royal Engineers
- Pte. J. Wedgwood, Border Regiment
- Acting Sgt. J. Wellington, Shropshire Light Infantry
- Sgt. F. Wells, London Regiment
- Pte. L. Wells, London Regiment
- Sapper (Acting L./C.) E. W. Welsh, Royal Engineers
- Sgt. (Acting Company Sgt-Maj.) A. West, Royal West Surrey Regiment
- Pte. P. F. West, Bedfordshire Regiment
- L./C. M. Westmoreland, Grenadier Guards
- Sapper H. Wharton, Royal Engineers
- Cpl. U. Wheatley, Dirham Light Infantry
- Pte. G. A. White, King's Royal Rifle Company
- Bombardier L. G. White, Royal Field Artillery
- Acting Cpl. M. White, East Lancashire Regiment
- L./C. R. White, Northumberland Fusiliers
- Gunner T. A. White, Royal Field Artillery
- Cpl. (Acting Sgt.) W. D. White, Royal Engineers
- Gunner A. F. Whitefield, Royal Field Artillery
- L./C. A. E. Whitlock, Royal Fusiliers
- Sgt. C. F. Whiteman, Rifle Brigade
- L./C. A. Whyte, Argyll and Sutherland Highlanders
- Pte. G. Whyte, Royal Munster Fusiliers
- Sgt. R. A. Wickens, Royal Berkshire Regiment
- Sgt. T. Widd, l/4th Bn., South Lancashire Regiment
- Pte. J. Wilde, York and Lancaster Regiment
- Cpl. F. J. Wilkins, Royal Field Artillery
- Sgt. S. Wilkinson, Northumberland Fusiliers
- Cpl. A. Williams, Somerset Light Infantry
- Pte. H. Williams, Royal Lancashire Regiment
- Sgt. J. Williams, Scots Rifles
- Acting Sgt. J. Williams, West Yorkshire Regiment
- Pte. O. Williams, Royal Welsh Fusiliers
- Pte. S. Williams, Border Regiment
- Pte. W. G. Williams, Liverpool Regiment
- Sgt. C. A. Wilmhurst, Royal Sussex Regiment
- Pte. C. Wilsher, Bedfordshire Regiment
- L./C. A. Wilson, Argyll and Sutherland Highlanders
- L./C. A. Wilson, Argyll and Sutherland Highlanders
- Pte. E. Wilson, York and Lancaster Regiment
- Pte. G. Wilson, Border Regiment
- Acting Cpl. T. J. Wilson, Middlesex Regiment
- Pte. W. Wilson, King's Owen Scottish Borderers
- Gunner H. W. Wilton, Royal Garrison Artillery
- Pte. M. Winch, Bedfordshire Regiment
- L./C. H. Winkle, Royal Engineers
- Gunner A. R. Winn, Royal Field Artillery
- Pte. E. W. Winslow, Coldstream Guards
- L./C. J. Witherden, Royal West Kent Regiment
- Acting Cpl. W. J. Wolfe, Royal Engineers
- Cpl. G. Wolsey, A Cyclist Corps.
- Pte. A. Wood, Seaforth Highlanders
- 2nd Cpl. P. Wood, Royal Engineers
- Pte. R. Wood, Worcestershire Regiment
- L./C. T. C. Wood, Leicestershire Regiment
- Pte. J. T. Woodcock, York and Lancaster Regiment
- Sgt. J. J. Woodfield, Royal Berkshire Regiment
- Sgt. C. Woolley, South Staffordshire Regiment
- L./C. H. J. Wootton, Royal Horse Guards
- Sgt. J. H. Wortley, Royal Field Artillery
- Sgt. A. E. Wright, Royal Field Artillery
- L./C. J. Wright, Royal Lancashire Regiment
- Sgt. S. E. Wright, Royal Fusiliers
- L./C. V. E. Wyber, Royal West Surrey Regiment
- Pte. J. Wyllie, Royal Welsh Fusiliers
- Acting Sgt. A. Young, Royal Sussex Regiment
- Acting Cpl. A. Young, Rifle Brigade
- L./C. J. Young, Royal Highlanders

Canadian Contingents

- 1742 Sgt. M. Allan, Princess Patricia's Canadian Light Infantry
- Sgt. H. Ashby, 7th Infantry Battalion
- Pte. E. Bartlett, 10th Infantry Battalion
- Pte. W. Bole, 8th Infantry Battalion
- L./C. J. Borland, 18th Infantry Battalion
- Pte. G. T. Boyd, 8th Infantry Battalion
- Sgt. J. G. Boyes, 16th Infantry Battalion
- L./C. H. H. Brown, Canadian Casualty Assembly Centre
- Sgt. E. W. Bussell, 2nd Infantry Battalion
- Sgt. J. Cameron, 28th Infantry Battalion
- Pte. S. G. Chalk, 1st Mounted Rifles Battalion
- Acting Cpl. J. L. Collins, 1st Divisional Signal Company Engineers.
- Sgt. A. H. Cox, 19th Infantry Battalion
- Sgt. J. Crossland, 4th Field Company Engineers
- Sgt. W. T. Crummy, 29th Infantry Battalion
- Pte. S. Deans, Canadian Army Medical Corps
- Acting Sgt. J. Dickie, Princess Patricia's Canadian Light Infantry
- Pte. W. Dillabough, 28th Infantry Brigade
- Sgt. J. Dungan, 29th Infantry Brigade
- Sgt. R. J. Edmunds, 21st Infantry Brigade
- Cpl. C. E. Finch, 18th Infantry Brigade
- Sgt. J. S. Fraser, 4th Field Company Engineers
- Cpl. W. Fullerton, 1st Divisional Signal Company Engineers
- Pte. S. Gillespie, 49th Infantry Battalion
- 2nd Cpl. B. C. Hall, 1st Field Company Engineers
- Pte. E. Hancock, 18th Inf. Bn.
- L./C. A. A. Harper, 13th Infantry Battalion
- Pte. T. Hodgson, 14th Infantry Battalion
- Pte. E. V. Ingram, Royal Canadian Regiment
- Bombardier A. Jackson, 15th Battalion Field Artillery
- Sgt. M. Jacob, 3rd Brigade, Field Artillery
- Pte. A. Jessiman, 27th Infantry Battalion
- Sgt. W. Johnson, 2nd Field Company Engineers
- L./C. A. H. Jones, 18th Infantry Battalion
- Sgt. W. J. Kingman, 42nd Infantry Battalion
- Staff Sgt. Wheeler. C. Landry, Canadian Army Service Corps
- Sgt. J. R. Lane, 5th Field Company Engineers
- L./C. E. Lawson, 18th Infantry Battalion
- Sgt. W. S. Lawson, 11th Battalion Field Artillery
- Sgt. H. Lock, 1st Infantry Battalion
- Sgt. A. McK. Macdonald, 49th Infantry Battalion
- Acting Company Sgt-Maj. H. Marshall, 15th Infantry Battalion
- Sgt. C. A. Martin, 19th Alberta Dragoons
- Sgt. G. L. Matheson, 25th Infantry Battalion
- Cpl. (Acting Sgt.) A. McBride, 1st Brigade, Field Artillery
- Sgt. H. McBride, 21st Infantry Battalion
- Pte. A. McCaughan, 10th Infantry Battalion
- Transport Sgt. R. McCleary, 3rd Infantry Battalion
- Pte. A. McDiarmid, 7th Infantry Battalion
- Sjt. F. S. McPherson, 1st Divisional Signal Company
- Cpl. A. Metzer, 39th Infantry Battalion
- Pte. R. Miller, 1st Infantry Battalion
- Sgt. R. Monahan, 2nd Brigade Field Artillery
- L./Sjt. C. Moore, 42nd Infantry Battalion
- Cpl. H. P. Morgan, 31st Infantry Battalion
- Pte. A. F. Mott, 24th Infantry Battalion
- Sgt. G. Nuttall, 10th Infantry Battalion
- Pte. J. Payne, 16th Infantry Battalion
- L./C. F. Pegamegabow, 1st Infantry Battalion
- Sgt. L. Rancourt, 22nd Infantry Battalion
- Cpl. S. Reid, 3rd Field Company Engineers
- Cpl. L. J. Rimmer, 10th Infantry Battalion
- Sgt. F. Rothery, 4th Infantry Battalion
- Staff Sgt. F. V. Scott, Canadian Cavalry Brigade, Machine Gun Squadron
- Cpl. R. Scott, 14th Infantry Battalion
- Pte. W. Sharland, 2nd Mounted Rifles Battalion
- Pte. C. E. Sheppard, 3rd Divisional Signal Company
- Staff Stg. Armt. Artificer C. K. Smith, 1st Brigade, Field Artillery
- Pte. H. Tate, 8th Infantry Battalion
- Sgt. V. W. Unwin, 2nd Infantry Battalion
- Driver F. Waghorn, 1st Motor Machine Gun Brigade
- Pte. F. J. Watson, 1st Infantry Battalion
- L./C. J. Watt, 22nd Infantry Battalion
- Pte. K. Weir, 7th Infantry Battalion
- Sgt. A. S. Whiteacre, 3rd Infantry Battalion
- Pte. H. J. Williams, 3rd Infantry Battalion
- Pte. L. J. Williams, 21st Infantry Battalion
- L./C. P. H. Witney, 10th Infantry Battalion
