= Sir Wolstan Dixie, 4th Baronet =

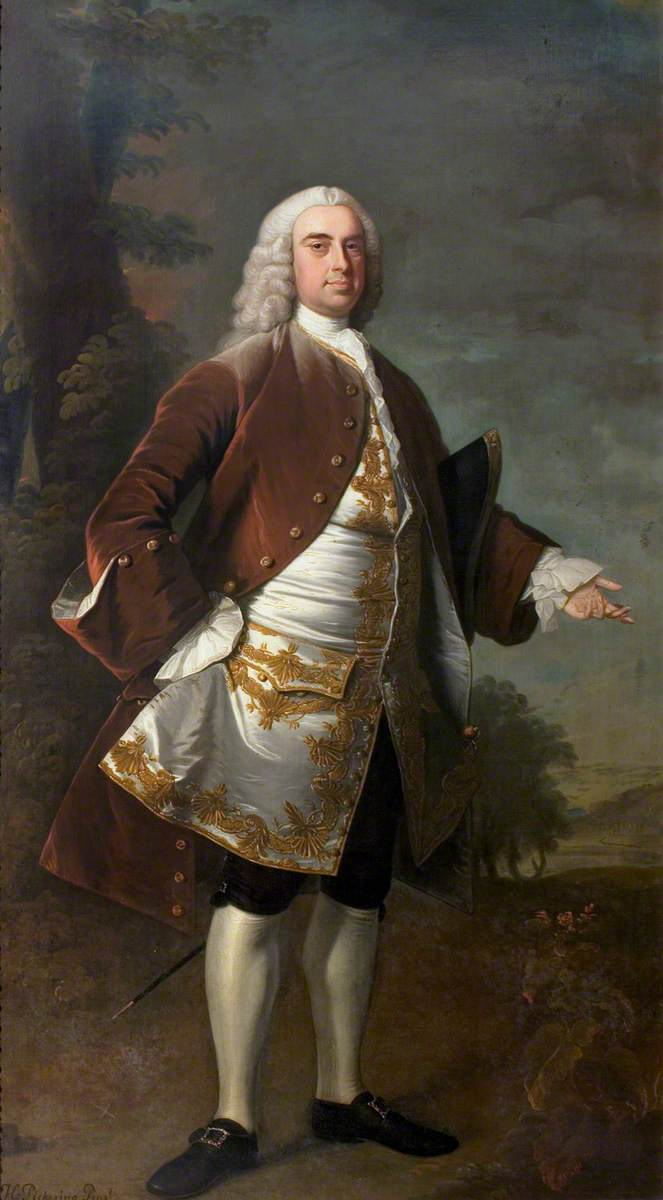
Dixie in a 1741 portrait by Henry Pickering

Sir Wolstan Dixie, 4th Baronet (1700–1767) was among the most colourful of the 13 Dixie baronets of Market Bosworth, descended from the second Sir Wolstan Dixie, knighted by James I in 1604, and Sheriff of Leicester (himself grand-nephew of the first Sir Wolstan Dixie, Lord Mayor of London in 1585, during the reign of Elizabeth I).

== Biography ==
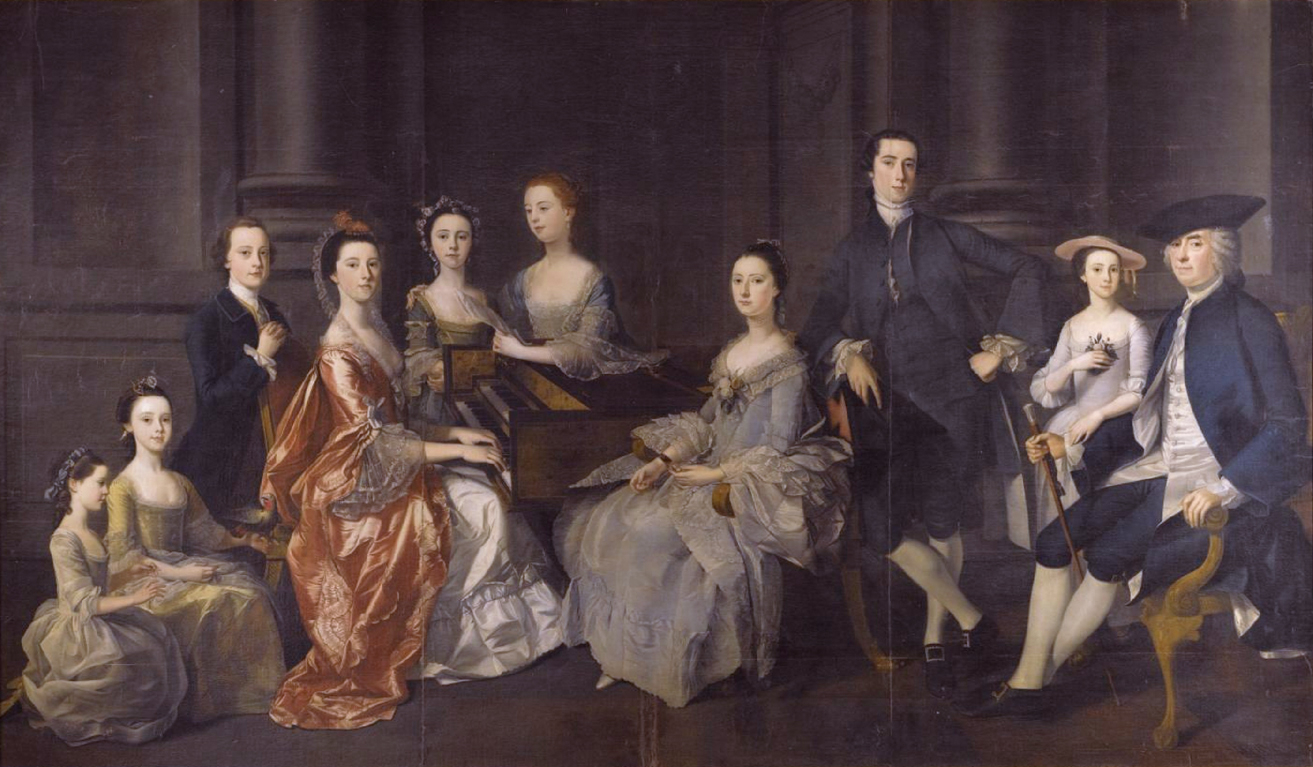
Wolstan Dixie, 4th Bt (1701–1767) of Bosworth Hall, Leicestershire, and his family seated around a harpsichord, by Henry Pickering (1755)

The 4th Baronet was born at Bosworth Hall in 1700. The very rare but characteristic male given name Wolstan is a variant spelling of Wulstan, probably deriving from Wolstan the 11th-century bishop.

Sir Wolstan was a colourful character and stories, real and possibly spurious abound. He was Sheriff of Leicestershire in 1727.

He had a reputation for being a pugnacious bully, with a penchant for using his fists to settle any dispute, which often set him at odds with his neighbours and even ex-employees. As the chief trustee of the local school he "had complete control" over the appointment of tutors at the establishment. In March 1732 he appointed Samuel Johnson (1709–1784) to the position of usher at the school, though he did not have the required university degree. Another stipulation of the school statutes that Dixie ignored was that the master be provided with a house of his own. Instead, Johnson was lodged at Bosworth Hall and, in the words of Johnson's biographer James Boswell (who had it from Johnson's friend John Taylor of Ashbourne), Johnson became "a kind of domestick chaplain, so far at least, as to say grace at table, but was treated with what he represented as intolerable harshness; and, after suffering for a few months such complicated misery, he relinquished a situation for which all his life afterwards he recollected with the strongest aversion, and even a degree of horrour".

Dixie was also "legendary for his ignorance". An anecdote was told about his violent encounter with a neighbouring squire who objected to Dixie barring access to a footpath across his land. The ensuing fight must have been memorable, for Dixie at least: when he was presented to the Germanic King George II at a levee as Sir Wolstan Dixie "of Bosworth Park", the king, wanting perhaps to show some knowledge of important English battles, said, "'Bosworth-Bosworth! Big battle at Bosworth, wasn't it?' 'Yes, Sire. But I thrashed him', replied Sir Wolstan, oblivious of any other fight than his own".

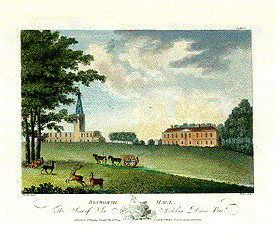
Bosworth Hall, 1791

One local story of him is that he strongly objected to men with waggons driving across his park, and having one day beaten the waggoner of a neighbouring squire, Wrightson Mundy of Osbaston Hall, Mundy himself dressed up as his waggoner, the cart was again attacked by Dixie, who was then soundly beaten by Mundy.

Another local story is that Sir Wolstan allegedly appointed his butler as headmaster of the Dixie Grammar School to prove to people that he could do anything he wanted to, and nobody could stop him. This story probably has its origin in well-documented conflicts between the 4th Baronet and the School.

A more disturbing (unattributed) local legend (in various versions) is the following: "But in 1758 tragedy finally resulted from one of Sir Wolstan's ill-conceived actions. He heard that his daughter Anne was surreptitiously meeting a young man in Bosworth Park and resolved to put a stop to the liaison. He put man-traps out to catch the young suitor but caught his daughter Ann instead. Although she was rescued from the trap and carried back to the hall, nothing could be done to staunch her wounds and she bled to death. Even today her ghost is said to haunt the hall..."

The 4th Baronet was renowned for engaging 'in lawsuits against the high and the low'. Among those lawsuits is evidence for a thwarted attempt to regain land at Appleby Magna which the Dormer family (Puritan and Roundhead) had acquired from the Royalist Dixie family during the English Civil War 1641–1651 or Commonwealth of England 1653–1659.

=== Marriage and issue ===
He was married three times:

- 1 May 1735, Anna Frere (died July 1739), daughter of John Frere, President of the Council of Barbados and heiress of Tobias Frere
- Theodosia Wright (died 14 May 1751), daughter of Henry Offley Wright
- Margaret Cross, daughter of William Cross

Following his death in 1767, he was succeeded by his son, also called Wolstan.

Baronetage of England
Preceded by Alexander Dixie	Baronet (of Market Bosworth); 1713–1767	Succeeded by Wolstan Dixie
