= Wolstan =

Wolstan is a masculine given name, an unusual variant spelling of Wulfstan. It may refer to:

- Wolstan Dixie (1524/1525–1594), English merchant, administrator and Lord Mayor of London in 1585
- Wolstan Dixie (born 1576) (1576–1650), English landowner, High Sheriff of Leicestershire and Member of Parliament
- Wolstan Dixie, the first, third, fourth, fifth and 13th of the Dixie baronets
  - Sir Wolstan Dixie, 4th Baronet (1700–1767)

== See also ==
- Weohstan, ealdorman of Wiltshire (died 802)
