= Arthur Benoni Evans =

British writer (1781–1854)

Arthur Benoni Evans (1781–1854) was a British clergyman and writer.

Evans was born at Compton Beauchamp in the English county of Berkshire (now in Oxfordshire), on 25 March 1781. His father, the Rev. Lewis Evans, vicar of Froxfield, Wiltshire, was a well-known astronomer, and held for many years the professorship of mathematics at the Royal Military Academy, Woolwich. He married Ann, eldest daughter of Thomas Norman. The second son, Arthur, received his education at the King's School, Gloucester, of which his uncle and namesake was head-master, and here he was known as ‘The Bold Arthur,’ from his remarkable personal courage. He went into residence at St John's College, Oxford, 23 October 1800, and proceeded B.A. 21 February 1804, M.A. 1820, and B.D. and D.D. 1828.

In addition to his knowledge of classical languages, Evans became versed in Hebrew, French, Italian, Spanish, German, and Icelandic. He had musical talent, and was a performer on several instruments. As an artist he sketched in pencil, crayon, and sepia, and his "cattle pieces" were of eminent merit. He studied geology and botany, and his knowledge of Greek, Roman, and English coins, of which he had a large collection, was considerable.

He was ordained to the curacy of Hartpury, Gloucester, in August 1804, and after receiving priest's orders in September 1805, was in the following month appointed professor of classics and history in the Royal Military College, then lately established at Great Marlow, Buckinghamshire, and he removed with the college to Sandhurst in October 1812. Resigning this appointment in 1822, he went to Britwell, near Burnham in Buckinghamshire, where he prepared pupils for the universities, and served the curacy of Burnham until 1829, when he accepted the head-mastership of the free grammar school at Market Bosworth, Leicestershire.

Evans was one of the few headmasters of the Dixie Grammar School to be appointed other than by the local Dixie baronets. The Bishop of Lincoln, John Kaye, appointed him since in 1829 the 8th Baronet was only a child of 13. The schools' commissioners reported Evans' tenure as one of the most successful in the school's history.

While resident at the Dixie Grammar School, he held successively the curacies of Bosworth, Carlton, and Cadeby between 1829 and 1841. He never derived from his clerical profession more than £100 a year and as a schoolmaster he was considered very successful.

== Family history ==
He died at Market Bosworth on 8 November 1854. In June 1819 he had married Anne, third daughter of Captain Thomas Dickinson, R.N., of Bramblebury, near Woolwich, and sister of John Dickinson. They had six children.

Anne Dickinson Evans died on 10 May 1883, aged 91.

=== Children ===
- Anne Evans (1820–1870), wrote poems and music, which in 1880 were edited and published with a memorial preface by Anne Thackeray Ritchie.
- Arthur Evans (1822–1850) Clerk in Holy Orders.
- John Evans, K.C.B., F.R.S. (1823–1908), was treasurer of the Royal Society (1878–98), president of the Society of Antiquaries (1885–92) and a writer on coins, and stone, bronze, and flint implements.
- George Evans (1825–1847)
- Emma Evans (1828–1905), a water-colour artist. She painted mainly natural objects, landscapes and trees, but she also sketched pencil portraits. She carved a series of large horse chestnuts (from Kew) of characters she knew; mounted them in a case as though they were a community of friars (the outer shell of the chest nut being the cowl.) She married John Waddington Hubbard (1823–1871). They had five children.
- Sebastian Evans (1830–1909), was a designer for glass work and a poet; he edited the Birmingham Gazette 1867–70, and was for some time the editor of The People, a conservative Sunday journal.

== Publications ==
1. 'Synopses for the use of the Students in the Royal Military Academy'
2. 'The Cutter, in five Lectures on the Art and Practice of Cutting Friends, Acquaintances, and Relations' (1808)
3. 'Fungusiana, or the Opinions and Table-talk of the late Barnaby Fungus, Esq.' (1809)
4. 'The Curate and other Poems' (1810)
5. 'Plain Sermons on the relative Duties of the Poor as Parents, Husbands, and Wives' (1822)
6. 'Present National Delusions upon Wisdom, Power, and Riches' (1831)
7. 'Sermons on the Christian Life and Character' (1832)
8. 'Effectual Means of Promoting and Propagating the Gospel' (1836)
9. 'The Phylactery', a poem (1836)
10. 'Calamus Scriptorius, or Copies for writing Greek' (1837)
11. 'The Fifth of November', a sermon (1838)
12. 'The Village Church', a poem (1843)
13. 'Education and Parental Example, in imitation of the XIVth satire of Juvenal', a poem (1843)
14. 'The Sanctuary Service and not the Sermon the great object of Public Worship' (1843)
15. 'The Layman's Test of the true Minister of the Church of England'
16. 'Divine Denunciations against Drinking, or the Word of God more powerful than Pledge-taking'
17. 'Leicestershire Words, Phrases, and Proverbs' (1848)
  (Enlarged edition, edited by Sebastian Evans; English Dialect Society, 1881.)
18. 'Personal Piety, or Aids to Private Prayer for Individuals of all Classes' (1851)
19. 'Britain's Wreck, or Breakers Ahead. By an Old Hand on Board' (1853)

== Sources ==
- This article incorporates text from a publication now in the public domain: Stephen, Leslie, ed. (1889). "Evans, Arthur Benoni". Dictionary of National Biography. Vol. 18. London: Smith, Elder & Co.
