= Philip Williamson =

Philip Williamson may refer to:

- Phil Williamson (born 1965), tennis player from the United States who competed for Antigua and Barbuda in the Davis Cup
- Philip Williamson (historian) (born 1953), British historian
