= Barlestone =

Village in Leicestershire, England

Coordinates: 52.646°N 1.373°W

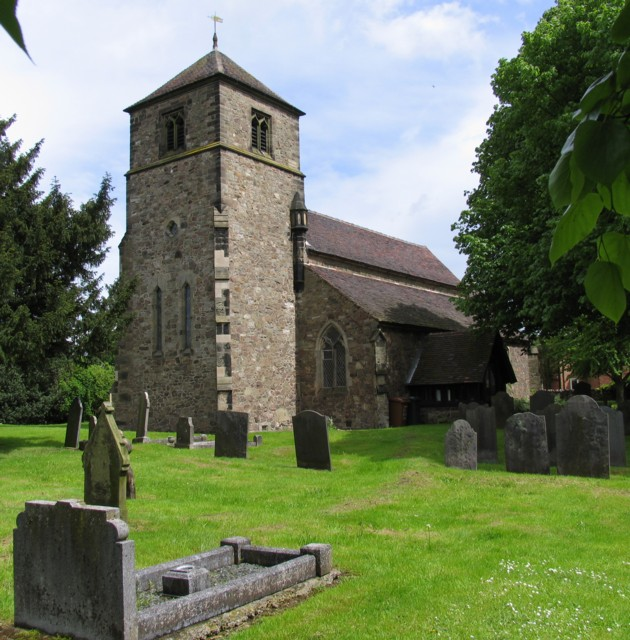
- St Giles' Church, Barlestone

- Location within Leicestershire
- Population: 2,471 (2001 census)
- OS grid reference: SK4205
- Civil parish: Barlestone
- District: Hinckley and Bosworth
- Shire county: Leicestershire
- Region: East Midlands
- Country: England
- Sovereign state: United Kingdom
- Post town: Nuneaton
- Postcode district: CV13
- Dialling code: 01455
- Police: Leicestershire
- Fire: Leicestershire
- Ambulance: East Midlands
- UK Parliament: Hinckley and Bosworth
- Website: Barlestone Parish Council

Barlestone is a village and civil parish in the Hinckley and Bosworth district of Leicestershire, England, adjoining the village of Osbaston. The UK census reported Barlestone's population as 2,471 in 2001, and 2,481 in 2011.

== History ==
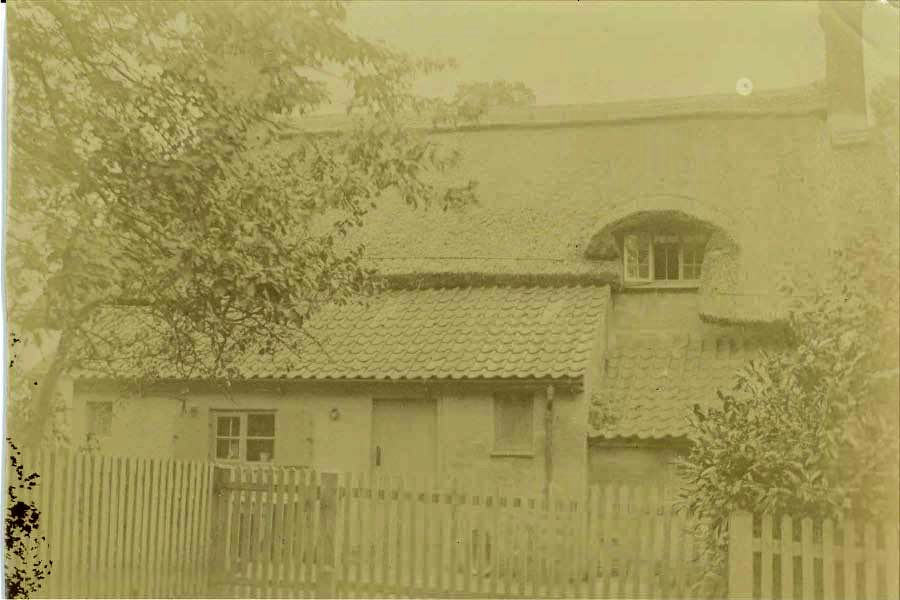
William Wright house, c.1848

The village's name means 'farm/settlement of Berwulf or Beornwulf'.

Although coal miners lived in the village, there was never a mine at Barlestone; the miners travelled to pits in Bagworth, Coalville and Newbold Heath. In the late 1980s, a pit wheel from a coal mine was installed in Barlestone to commemorate the miners.

== Amenities ==
The village has three places of worship:

- St Giles' Church, Barlestone on Church Road, designed by the Gothic Revival architect Ewan Christian and built in 1855.
- A Baptist church on West End
- Elohim Church at Elohim Church Hub, Newbold Road (originally the Jolly Toper public house)

A former Methodist church on Newbold Road has been converted to housing.

Barlestone has 2 public houses: The Three Tuns; and The Red Lion, formerly an Indian restaurant (and prior to that, another pub called the Red Lion).

A cooperative store containing the post office is opposite The Three Tuns pub. There are two hairdressers, a fish and chip shop, a Chinese take-away, Barlestone St. Giles Sports & Social Club, and an Indian restaurant, Daawat.

St. Giles Football Club plays matches on Saturdays and Sunday afternoons.

Barlestone Church of England Primary School is a coeducational school with around 200 pupils between the ages of 4 and 11, and an Ofsted rating of "Good". Most of its graduates transfer to The Market Bosworth School or Bosworth Academy in Desford.

== History (building) ==
This village dates back far – even Anglo-Saxons. Most forms of the village formed in the 17th century. e.g. The Manor House -which led back to 1638- leads to manor road. Barlestone C of E Primary school was something used in WW1 time.
