= Lewis Evans (mathematician) =

Welsh mathematician (1755–1827)

- Born: Lewis Evans; 1755; Bassaleg, Newport, Monmouthshire, Wales, United Kingdom
- Died: 19 November 1827; Froxfield, Wales
- Education: Merton College, Oxford
- Spouse: Ann Norman
- Relatives: Thomas Simpson Evans; Arthur Benoni Evans (sons); Anne Evans(granddaughter); Sebastian Evans(grandson)
- Awards: Fellow of the Royal Society; Royal Astronomical Society
- Scientific career
- Fields: Mathematics and physics
- Workplaces: Royal Military Academy, Woolwich

Lewis Evans (1755 – 19 November 1827) was a Welsh mathematician.

== Life ==
Evans, son of the Rev. Thomas Evans of Bassaleg, Newport, Monmouthshire, was born in 1755. He was matriculated at Merton College, Oxford, 16 December 1774, but left the university without a degree. In 1777 he was ordained by the Bishop of Lichfield and Coventry, his first curacy being that of Ashbury, Berkshire, where he served until 6 July 1778. He then commenced residence as curate of Compton, Berkshire, and continued there until 1788, in which year he received institution to the vicarage of Froxfield, Wiltshire, where he held the living until his death.

In 1799 he was appointed first mathematical master at the Royal Military Academy, Woolwich, in which post he laboured until 1820. In addition to a competent knowledge of various sciences, he had turned much of his attention, in the latter part of his life, to astronomy. He possessed several valuable instruments, among which was one of Troughton's best transit circles. Evans for many years employed himself as a skilful and successful observer, having his own private observatory on Woolwich Common. Charles Hutton's 1815 list of England's 20 most notable private observatories (excluding the King's private observatory) included the observatory at Woolwich.

Evans was elected Fellow of the Royal Society on 29 May 1823, and was also fellow of the Royal Astronomical Society. He died at Froxfield on 19 November 1827. By his wife, Ann Norman, he was father of Thomas Simpson Evans, and of Arthur Benoni Evans. His grandchildren included the poets Anne Evans and Sebastian Evans.

== Works ==
To the Philosophical Magazine Evans contributed the following dissertations: ‘An improved Demonstration of Newton's Binomial Theorem on Fluxional Principles’ (vol. xxiv.); ‘Observations of α Polaris for determining the North Polar Distance of that Star at the beginning of 1813’ (vol. xliii.); ‘Tables of the Sun's Altitude and Zenith Distance, for every day in the year’ (vol. lvi.); ‘The Solar Eclipse, observed on 7th Sept. 1820’ (vol. lvi.)
