= Noel Birch =

British Royal Artillery officer during the Second Boer War and World War I

General Sir Noel Birch GBE KCB KCMG
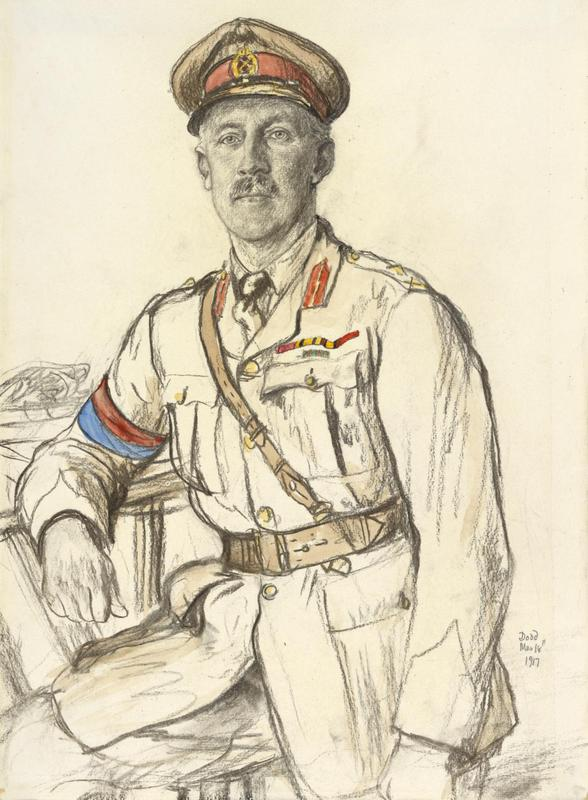
- 1917 portrait by Francis Dodd
- Born: James Frederick Noel Birch; 29 December 1865; Llanrhaiadr, Denbighshire
- Died: 3 February 1939 (aged 73); Lambeth, London, England
- Military career
- Allegiance: United Kingdom
- Branch: British Army
- Service years: 1885–1927
- Rank: General
- Nickname: 'Curly'
- Unit: Royal Horse Artillery
- Commands: Master-General of the Ordnance; Territorial Army; 7th Brigade, Royal Horse Artillery; 30th Battalion, Imperial Yeomanry
- Conflicts: Fourth Anglo-Ashanti War; Second Boer War; Siege of Kimberley; Battle of Diamond Hill; First World War; Western Front; Great Retreat; First Battle of the Aisne
- Awards: Knight Grand Cross of the Order of the British Empire; Knight Commander of the Order of the Bath; Knight Commander of the Order of St Michael and St George

General Sir James Frederick Noel Birch (29 December 1865 – 3 February 1939) was a British Royal Artillery officer during the Second Boer War and the First World War who served as Master-General of the Ordnance from 1923 to 1927. The Birch gun was named after him.

== Military career ==
Birch was the second son of Major Richard Birch and was born at Llanrhaiadr, Denbighshire and educated at Giggleswick School, Marlborough College and the Royal Military Academy, Woolwich. After graduating from the latter, he was commissioned as a lieutenant into the Royal Horse Artillery in May 1885.

In 1895 to 1896 he took part in the Ashanti expedition. In the Second Boer War in South Africa he served with the Royal Horse Artillery in the Cavalry Division under the command of Sir John French, taking part in the relief of Kimberley, the operations in the Orange Free State and the Transvaal, and being present at the Battle of Diamond Hill. He was promoted on 15 March 1900 from the supernumary rank of captain to captain and then to major, dated 19 June, and served in Cape Colony the following year. In January 1902 he received the temporary rank of lieutenant colonel when he was given command of the 30th Battalion of the Imperial Yeomanry, which left Southampton for South Africa four months later. The battalion arrived in early May, shortly after the conclusion of hostilities, and he left for home again with the battalion in December 1902, and relinquished command in early February 1903.

Birch was in command of the Riding Establishment at Woolwich from 1905 to 1907. In January 1912 he was promoted to the substantive rank of lieutenant colonel and commanded the 7th Brigade, Royal Horse Artillery.

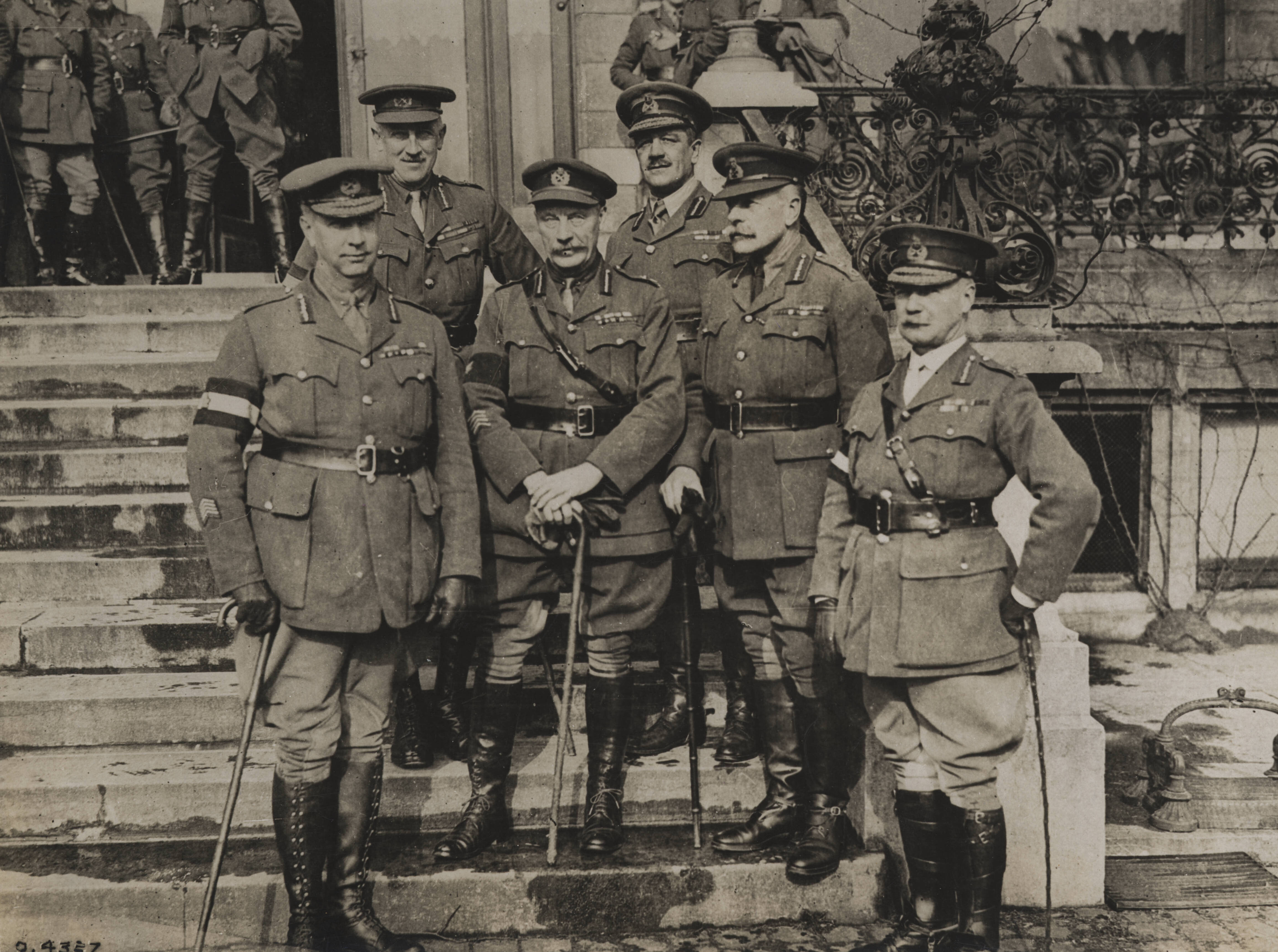
Field Marshal Sir Douglas Haig, C-in-C of the BEF, with Lieutenant General Arthur Currie (left), GOC of the Canadian Corps, and Currie's senior commanders in Germany, December 1918. Standing behind Currie is Birch.

Birch went with his brigade to France in August 1914, serving under the command of Major General Edmund Allenby, in the retreat from Mons and in the First Battle of the Aisne and Ypres-Armentières. After serving as a GSO1 in October 1914, he was, in January 1915, promoted to the temporary rank of brigadier general and appointed brigadier general, general staff (BGGS) of the Cavalry Corps, taking over from Brigadier General George Barrow. He was made a brevet colonel the next month and appointed a personal aide-de-camp to King George V.

A few months later he became commander, Royal Artillery (CRA) of the 7th Division, going in the same position in July to the I Corps, then commanded by Lieutenant General Sir Douglas Haig. In May 1916, the month before he was made a Companion of the Order of the Bath, Haig brought him to general headquarters as artillery adviser, a post he held until the end of the war. He was promoted to temporary major general in February 1916, which was made substantive in January 1917. He was promoted again, to substantive lieutenant-general, in January 1919 and in October that year he was made a colonel commandant of the Royal Artillery.

In February 1920, Birch became director of remounts at the War Office, taking over from Major General William Henry Birkbeck. In the following year he was appointed director general of the Territorial Army and the development of cadet corps. In 1923 he became colonel commandant of the Royal Horse Artillery, and in the same year he was appointed Master-General of the Ordnance, a post he held until 1927. He was promoted general in October 1926 and retired from the army in the following year to become a director of Vickers-Armstrong.

Birch married Florence Hyacynthe Chetwode (1876–1938), the third daughter of Sir George Chetwode and Alice Jane Bass and sister of Philip Chetwode, 1st Baron Chetwode.

Birch died on 3 February 1939 at Kings College Hospital, London aged 73.

== Publications ==
- Modern Riding (1909)
- Modern Riding and Horse Education (1912)

Military offices
Preceded by Sir John Du Cane	Master-General of the Ordnance; 1923–1927	Succeeded by Sir Webb Gillman
