= Anne Evans (poet) =

English poet and composer (1820–1870)

Anne Evans (4 June 1820 – 19 February 1870) was an English poet and composer. She has been described as "a witty poet and skilled composer of dance songs". Her Poems and Music were published posthumously in 1880.

== Background ==
Evans was in 1820, at Frimley, Surrey, near Sandhurst, the eldest daughter of Arthur Benoni Evans (1781–1854) and his wife, Anne Norman. Her father was a noted linguist and numismatist, who was a professor of classics and history at the Royal Military Academy Sandhurst, and her grandfather the Welsh-born mathematician and astronomer Lewis Evans (1755–1827). Of her brothers and sisters, Sebastian Evans (1830–1909), also wrote poetry.

The family moved to Britwell, and in 1829 to Market Bosworth, Leicestershire, where her father became headmaster of Dixie Grammar School. Anne was educated at home. After her father's death in 1854, she moved to 16 Kensington Square in London. In the 1850s she spent some time as a companion, in England and abroad, to the two daughters of the novelist William Makepeace Thackeray, the elder being the future novelist Anne Thackeray Ritchie.

Evans stayed single. Her health declined in 1867 and she remained an invalid until her death on 19 February 1870. She was survived by her mother, who died in 1883 aged 91.

== Writings ==
Evans's earliest extant poem was "Flora's Lesson". She became an emotional poet by conviction. As she once remarked, "If anyone expects to find poetry without susceptibility, let him look at the sky for a rainbow without rain."

Her works included sonnets, a verse drama called Maurice Clifton, and two ballads, "Sir Ralph Duguay" and "Orinda". She was noted also for her epigrams and witty definitions. Her work was eventually published in an 1880 edition of her Poems and Music. This included a memorial preface by Anne Thackeray Ritchie, in which she described her as a "diffident woman, who... unconsciously touched and influenced us all by her intense sincerity of heart and purpose."
