= Thomas Simpson Evans =

British mathematician

Thomas Simpson Evans (1777–1818) was a British mathematician.

== Life ==
Evans, eldest son of the Rev. Lewis Evans (1755–1827), by his wife, Ann Norman, was baptised in August 1777. He was named after Thomas Simpson, the mathematician.

In or about 1797 Evans appears to have taken charge of a private observatory at Blackheath belonging to William Larkins, formerly accountant-general to the East India Company in Bengal. After the death of Larkins, 24 April 1800, he was taken on as an assistant by Nevil Maskelyne at the Royal Observatory, Greenwich, but resigned the post in 1805.

In that year, or perhaps in 1803, Evans was appointed mathematical master under his father at the Royal Military Academy, Woolwich. Here he continued until 1810, when he accepted the mastership of the mathematical school at New Charlton, near Woolwich, which office he vacated in 1813 to become master of the mathematics at Christ's Hospital, London. His attainments won for him the degree of LL.D. (from what university is not known) and the fellowship of the Linnean Society.

Evans died 28 October 1818, aged 41.

== Works ==
Evans left a completed translation of Antonio Cagnoli's Trigonometria piana e sferica, besides other translations of scientific works and a collection of unfinished papers in several branches of philosophy. He also contributed some articles to the Philosophical Magazine, among which were:

- "Problems on the Reduction of Angles" (vol. xxviii.);
- "An Abridgment of the Life of Julien Le Roy, the Watchmaker, by his Son" (vol. xxxi.);
- "A Short Account of Improvements gradually made in determining the Astronomic Refraction" (vol. xxxvi.);
- "Historical Memoranda respecting Experiments intended to ascertain the Calorific Powers of the different Prismatic Rays" (vol. xlv.);
- "On the Laws of Terrestrial Magnetism in different Latitudes" (vol. xlix.).

Evans's library was considered a valuable collection of mathematical and philosophical works.

== Family ==
By his marriage in 1797 to Deborah, daughter of John Mascall of Ashford, Kent, Evans had five children:

- Thomas Simpson Evans (1798–1880), vicar of St Leonard's, Shoreditch;
- Aspasia Evans (1799–1876), a spinster;
- Herbert Norman Evans, M.D. (1802–1877), book collector;
- Arthur Benoni Evans (d. 1838); and
- Lewis Evans (1815–1869), head-master of Sandbach Free Grammar School, Cheshire.
