= The Market Bosworth School =

Location
- Station Road; Market Bosworth, Leicestershire, CV13 0JT; England; 52°37′26″N 1°24′14″W

Information
- Type: Secondary school; Academy
- Established: 1949
- Department for Education URN: 138108 Tables
- Ofsted: Reports
- Principal: Stuart Wilson
- Gender: Coeducational
- Age: 11 to 16
- Enrolment: 873
- Website: Official website

The Market Bosworth School (formerly Market Bosworth High School, abbreviated as TMBS) is a secondary school with academy status located in the small town of Market Bosworth in Leicestershire, England. The school was rated 'Outstanding' in its 2024 OFSTED inspection.

Market Bosworth was established in 1969, as a comprehensive school for both sexes of any ability between the ages of 11 and 14. The school is next door to Dixie Grammar School.

Students start after leaving primary schools in villages such as Barlestone, Newbold Verdon and Desford.

In October 2012, a question posed by students at Market Bosworth High School was the first to be used in the world's first live broadcast via Facebook of a science lesson at the Royal Albert Hall, in London. The broadcast was streamed live via the internet to classrooms across the world over 15 minutes to an online audience of thousands, including pupils from the Leicestershire school. The question posed by pupils was "can sound warm objects up?" It was selected by organisers as their favourite and was answered by Dallas Campbell and Dr Yan Wong, presenters of BBC1 show Bang Goes The Theory.

In March 2013, TMBS won the National Science and Engineering Week Award for Best Secondary School Event of the year. Their four-day 'TMBS Year 5 Science Fairs' were host to 250 Year 5 pupils from local primary schools and opened by former Leicester City Football Club captain Steve Walsh.

== Controversies ==
David Brinded, a former teacher at Market Bosworth High School who later became a headteacher, was found guilty of sexually assaulting an 11-year-old student during a French lesson in the 1970s. The victim, now in her mid-50s, reported the incident at the time, but no charges were filed against Brinded, who subsequently left the school for a new teaching position. The issue was brought back to the fore in 2013, when the victim made a formal complaint, leading to a trial where Brinded was convicted on one count of indecent assault. Despite his denial of the allegations and character witnesses describing him as a dedicated teacher and an "inspirational" leader, Brinded was warned by the court to expect a custodial sentence.

In November 2018, an incident during a charity event at TMBS resulted in student Katie Freeman's exclusion from the school. The event involved students playfully throwing wet sponges at staff, but when Katie threw a Haribo gummy bear at the deputy head teacher, it was classified as "assaulting an adult" by the school. This led to Katie's placement in isolation, subsequent exclusion, and disqualification from a forthcoming ski trip. This strict interpretation of discipline underscored the school's firm stance on maintaining a respectful learning environment, though it sparked debate about the proportionality of the measures.

== Notable former pupils ==
- Colin Pitchfork – the first person convicted of murder based on DNA fingerprinting evidence
