= Philip Williamson (historian) =

English historian

Philip Williamson (born 1953) is a British historian.

Williamson grew up in Leicestershire, and attended Bosworth School and Community College (formerly Dixie Grammar School) in Desford. He studied history at Peterhouse, Cambridge, under Maurice Cowling, and is considered one of the members of the Peterhouse school of history. He is now emeritus professor of modern British history at the University of Durham.

== Works ==
=== Author ===
- National Crisis and National Government. British Politics, the Economy and Empire 1926-1932 (Cambridge University Press, 1992).
- Stanley Baldwin. Conservative Leadership and National Values (Cambridge University Press, 1999).

=== Editor ===
- The Modernisation of Conservative Politics. The Diaries and Letters of William Bridgeman 1904-1935 (The Historians' Press, 1988).
- (with Edward Baldwin), Baldwin Papers. A Conservative Statesman 1908-1947 (Cambridge University Press, 2004).
- (with Natalie Mears, Alasdair Raffe & Stephen Taylor), National Prayers: Special Worship since the Reformation. Volume 1: Special Prayers, Fasts and Thanksgivings in the British Isles, 1533-1688 (Church of England Record Society, 2013).
- (with Alasdair Raffe, Stephen Taylor & Natalie Mears), National Prayers: Special Worship since the Reformation. Volume 2: General Fasts, Thanksgivings and Special Prayers in the British Isles, 1689-1870 (Church of England Record Society, 2017).
