= Geoffrey White (British Army officer) =

British Army general (1870–1959)

Major-General Geoffrey White CB CMG DSO
- Born: 3 November 1870; St George Hanover Square, London, England
- Died: 15 December 1959 (aged 89)
- Military career
- Allegiance: United Kingdom
- Branch: British Army
- Service years: 1890–1929
- Rank: Major-General
- Service number: 171
- Unit: Royal Artillery
- Commands: Woolwich Sub-Area; Royal Military Academy, Woolwich; Royal Artillery Riding Establishment
- Conflicts: Second Boer War; First World War
- Awards: Companion of the Order of the Bath; Companion of the Order of St Michael and St George; Companion of the Distinguished Service Order; Mentioned in Despatches

Major-General Geoffrey Herbert Anthony White, CB, CMG, DSO (3 November 1870 – 15 December 1959) was a British Army officer who served as Commandant of the Royal Military Academy, Woolwich, from 1918 to 1920.

== Military career ==
Educated at Eton College and the Royal Military Academy, Woolwich, White was commissioned into the Royal Artillery as a second lieutenant on 25 July 1890, and promoted to lieutenant on 25 July 1893. He served in the Second Boer War and took part in the Relief of Kimberley, during which he was promoted to captain on 13 February 1900.

White was promoted to major on 1 April 1908 and, in 1910, became superintendent of the Royal Artillery Riding Establishment. He served in the First World War as commander of K Battery, Royal Horse Artillery and as Commander, Royal Artillery for 30th Division. He was appointed commandant of the Royal Military Academy, Woolwich, in June 1918, and was promoted to the temporary rank of major general whilst employed in this role. He was promoted to substantive colonel on 2 June 1919, and became commandant of the Woolwich Sub-Area in 1920 and director of remounts at the War Office in London in 1925 before he retired from the army in February 1929.

White was appointed colonel commandant of the Royal Artillery in February 1934, after the death of General Sir Percy Radcliffe. He was author of the book Single and Pair Horse Driving, published by the British Driving Society in 1950.

== Family ==
In 1918 White married Beatrice de Chair.

Military offices
Preceded by William Cleeve	Commandant of the Royal Military Academy Woolwich; 1918–1920	Succeeded by Webb Gillman
