= St Giles' Church, Barlestone =

Church in Barlestone, Leicestershire

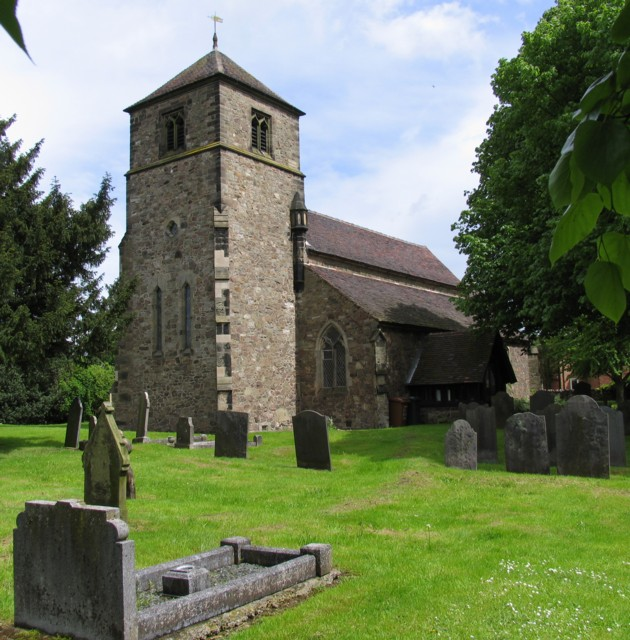
- St Giles' Church, Barlestone
- Denomination: Church of England

History
- Dedication: St Giles

Administration
- Diocese: Leicester
- Archdeaconry: Loughborough
- Parish: Barlestone, Leicestershire

Clergy
- Rector: Sue Ives-Smith

St Giles' Church is a church in Barlestone, Leicestershire. It is a Grade II listed building.

== History ==
The church was completely rebuilt, except the chancel, in 1855 and was designed by Ewan Christian.

It consists of a nave, south porch, chancel, tower with 2 bells and north and south aisles.

William Sills is remembered in two windows placed by his widow. Several other memorials to the Sills family can be found across the church.

There is a memorial to the 7 men of Barlestone who lost their lives in World War I. It depicts St George carved in a niche in front of the pulpit.
