= William Cleeve =

British Army general (1853–1922)

Major-General William Cleeve CB JP
- Born: 24 January 1853; Barbados, Lesser Antilles
- Died: 31 January 1922 (aged 69); Cheltenham, Gloucestershire, England
- Burial place: Llanfrechfa, Wales
- Military career
- Allegiance: United Kingdom
- Branch: British Army
- Service years: 1873–1918
- Rank: Major-General
- Unit: Royal Artillery
- Commands: Royal Military Academy, Woolwich
- Conflicts: Second Anglo-Afghan War; First World War
- Awards: Companion of the Order of the Bath

Major-General William Frederick Cleeve, CB, JP (24 January 1853 – 31 January 1922) was a British Army officer who served as commandant of the Royal Military Academy, Woolwich, from 1914 to 1918.

== Military career ==
Cleeve was commissioned into the Royal Artillery as a lieutenant on 29 April 1873. He served in Second Anglo-Afghan War (1878–80), was promoted to captain on 1 September 1882, to major on 12 February 1890, and to lieutenant-colonel on 3 January 1899. He was appointed Chief Instructor in Gunnery in 1901, and promoted to colonel on 3 January 1903. In 1914 he was appointed commandant of the Royal Military Academy, Woolwich, holding that post throughout the First World War.

Cleeve was appointed a Companion of the Order of the Bath in 1916.

== Family ==
In 1894, Cleeve married Gwladys Elizabeth Mitchell.

Military offices
Preceded by Arthur Holland	Commandant of the Royal Military Academy Woolwich; 1914–1918	Succeeded by Geoffrey White
