= John Taylor of Ashbourne =

English lawyer and cleric

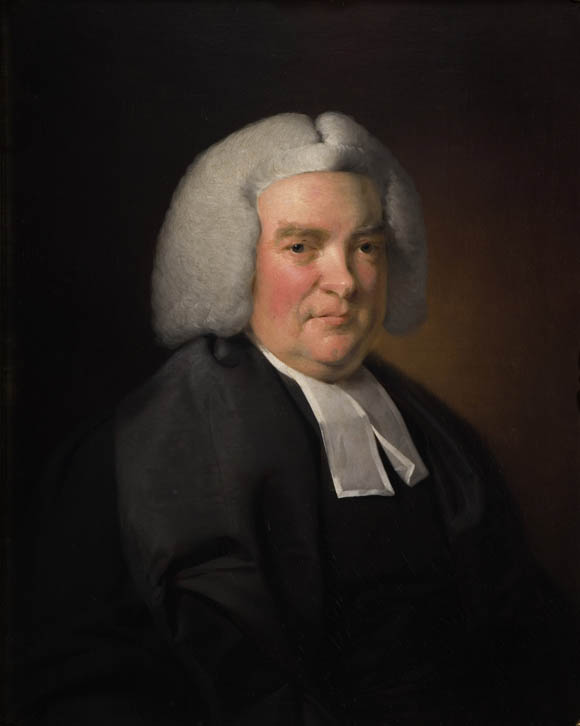
John Taylor of Ashbourne, 1760s portrait by Joseph Wright of Derby

John Taylor (baptised 1711 – 1788) of Ashbourne, Derbyshire was an English lawyer and cleric, known as a wealthy landowner and stockbreeder. He was at school with Samuel Johnson, and they became lifelong friends.

== Early life ==
Baptised at Ashbourne, on 18 March 1711, he was son of Thomas Taylor (1671–1730?) of Ashbourne and his wife Mary, daughter of Thomas Wood. His father was a wealthy country attorney. He was educated with Samuel Johnson by the Rev. John Hunter at Lichfield grammar school; he and Edmund Hector were the last survivors of Johnson's school friends.

Taylor would have followed Johnson to Pembroke College, Oxford, but was dissuaded by his friend's report of the ignorance of William Jorden, the tutor there. He matriculated at Christ Church in 1729, with a view to studying the law. He left without taking a degree, and apparently for some years practised as an attorney.

== Ecclesiastical preferment ==
Taylor was ordained deacon in Church of England in 1738, by Joseph Wilcocks, Bishop of Rochester; and priest in 1739. In July 1740 he was presented, on the nomination of Sir Wolstan Dixie, 4th Baronet, to the rectory of Market Bosworth in Leicestershire. The duties were performed by a curate. This preferment he retained for the rest of his life; he was unpopular with his parishioners. Taylor returned to Oxford and graduated B.A. and M.A. in 1742. In 1752, he proceeded LL.B. and LL.D.

On 11 July 1746 Taylor obtained, presumably through the influence of his patron the Duke of Devonshire, a prebendal stall at Westminster Abbey, which he retained for life. By the appointment of the chapter he held in succession a series of preferments, all of which were held with his stall and with his living of Market Bosworth. These were the post of minister of the chapel in the Broadway, Westminster, 1748; the perpetual curacy of St Botolph's, Aldersgate, 1769; and the place of minister of St Margaret's, Westminster, which he held from April 1784 to his death.

== Friendship with Johnson ==
Through life, Taylor maintained his friendship with Samuel Johnson. Johnson was at Ashbourne in 1737 and 1740; and in the 13 years from 1767 to 1779, only three times failed to visit Taylor. He acted in 1749 as mediator in the quarrel of David Garrick and Johnson over the play Irene. He read the service at Johnson's funeral.

Despite his constant talk of bullocks, and his habits that were "by no means sufficiently clerical", Johnson was very attached to Taylor, and considered him "a very sensible, acute man", with a strong mind. Taylor was noted for his breed of milch-cows: his "great bull" is a subject of jest in Johnson's letters.

James Boswell and Johnson came to Ashbourne on 26 March 1776, driving from Lichfield in Taylor's "large roomy postchaise, drawn by four stout plump horses, and driven by two steady jolly postilions." The house and establishment matched their host's "size and figure and countenance and manner were that of a hearty English squire".

== "King of Ashbourne" ==
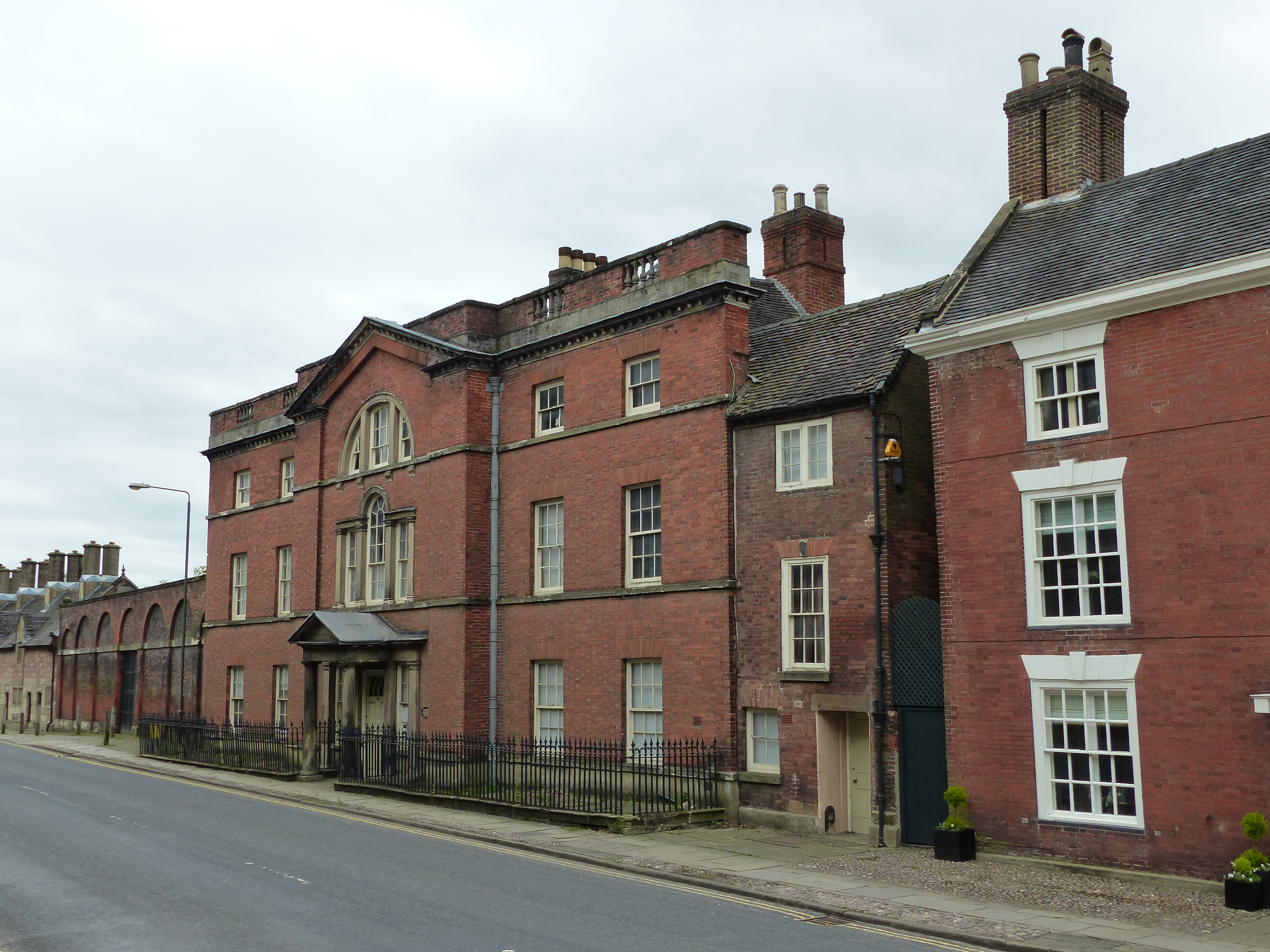
The Mansion, Ashbourne, 2015 photograph

Taylor became a rich man: his annual income was estimated at £7,000, of which £1,000 came from church appointments. The estimate is attributed to the Rev. Francis Jourdain, vicar of Ashbourne in the late 19th century. His interests included the Hubberdale mine, near Monyash.

A Whig in politics, Taylor became chaplain to William Cavendish, 3rd Duke of Devonshire; who was lord-lieutenant of Ireland from 1737 to 1745. The Cavendish parliamentary interest at this period was predominant in Derbyshire, outstripping the Curzons.

The Mansion, Ashbourne was a family property that came to Taylor. He had the frontage rebuilt c.1765; the design is attributed to Joseph Pickford. Taylor spent much time there. He became a J.P. for Derbyshire on 6 October 1761, and was known as "the King of Ashbourne." Nathaniel Curzon, 1st Baron Scarsdale dined with Taylor at The Mansion in 1775.

== Death ==
Taylor died at Ashbourne on 29 February 1788, and was buried in Ashbourne church, on 3 March.

== Works ==
Taylor published in 1787 A Letter to Samuel Johnson, LL.D., on the subject of a Future State, which was inscribed to William Cavendish, 5th Duke of Devonshire, at whose command it was issued. It is said to have been drawn up at Johnson's request, and with reference to his remark that "he would prefer a state of torment to that of annihilation." Appended to it were three letters by Johnson.

== Legacy ==
Taylor, who had no surviving child that lived, left his property to a boy, William Brunt (born 1772), who had been engaged as a page. It was stipulated that William should take the name of Webster, connected with the family of Taylor.

Johnson wrote sermons as commissions, charging two guineas for each, and Taylor was his main client. After Taylor's death there appeared Sermons on Different Subjects, left for publication by John Taylor, LL.D. (two vols., 1788–9), edited by the Rev. Samuel Hayes. They were often reprinted. They are still believed to have been mainly composed by Johnson.

James Boswell's Life of Samuel Johnson incorporated material dictated to him by Taylor. Numerous letters from Johnson to Taylor were printed in Notes and Queries (6th series); three of them were known to Boswell, and about a dozen were printed by Sir John Simeon, 3rd Baronet, their owner in 1861, for the Philobiblon Society. With others, those were included in George Birkbeck Norman Hill's edition of Johnson's letters; other letters are in Hill's Johnsonian Miscellanies.

== Family ==
On 9 April 1732 Taylor married at Croxall, Derbyshire, Elizabeth, daughter of William Webb of the parish. She was buried at Ashbourne on 13 January 1746. His second wife was Mary, daughter of Roger Tuckfield of Fulford Park, Devon. They did not live together happily, and in August 1763 she left him.
