= Webb Gillman =

British Army general (1870–1933)

General Sir Webb Gillman KCB KCMG DSO
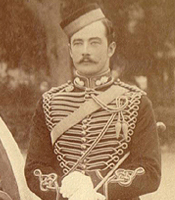
- Lieutenant Webb Gillman, c. 1896
- Born: 26 October 1870; Galle, Ceylon
- Died: 20 April 1933 (aged 62); London, England
- Military career
- Allegiance: United Kingdom
- Branch: British Army
- Service years: 1889–1933
- Rank: General
- Commands: Eastern Command; Royal Military Academy, Woolwich; 17th Indian Division
- Conflicts: Second Boer War: Siege of Kimberley; Battle of Paardeberg; Battle of Driefontein; Anglo-Aro War; First World War: Retreat from Mons; First Battle of the Marne; First Battle of the Aisne; Gallipoli campaign; Mesopotamian campaign; Macedonian front
- Awards: Knight Commander of the Order of the Bath; Knight Commander of the Order of St Michael and St George; Distinguished Service Order; Mentioned in Despatches (11)

General Sir Webb Gillman, KCB, KCMG, DSO (26 October 1870 – 20 April 1933) was a British Army general during the First World War. As a captain in the Royal Field Artillery, he saw service in the Second Boer War before being posted to Nigeria for service in the Aro-Anglo war. At the outbreak of the First World War, he took command of an artillery battery in the 1st Division, and served with them through the opening months of the war. He served as a staff officer during the Gallipoli campaign, then in Mesopotamia and Macedonia, ending the war as a major-general. In 1931 he was appointed to command Eastern Command in the United Kingdom, and died in that post in 1933.

== Personal life ==
Webb Gillman was born on 26 October 1870 in Galle, Ceylon, the second son of Herbert Webb Gillman CCS and Annie née Mackwood.

On 8 February 1911 he married Caroline Grace Elizabeth Rube, the daughter of Charles Rube. They had three children: Herbert Charles Rube (1912–1970), who fought in the Second World War, was appointed a MBE and awarded the Croix de Guerre, reaching the rank of Colonel in the Royal Artillery; Catherine Anne Rube (1913-?) and Susan Elizabeth (1915–1961).

== Early military career ==
Educated at Dulwich College, Gillman was commissioned into the Royal Field Artillery in July 1889. He was promoted to lieutenant on 27 July 1892, and to captain (supernumerary to the establishment) on 9 October 1899. He served in the Second Boer War 1899–1900, where he took part in the Relief of Kimberley, and the following battles of Paardeberg (late February 1900), Poplar Grove, and Driefontein (March 1900).

In late 1901 he was in Southern Nigeria, where he was attached as a staff officer to the columns taking part in the Aro-Anglo war (November 1901 to March 1902), for which he was mentioned in despatches by the officer in command as an "invaluable officer, cool and full of energy". He was also appointed a Companion of the Distinguished Service Order (DSO) for services during the war. In May 1902 he received a regular appointment as captain of the 119 Battery of the Field Artillery. He later spent time in Southern Nigeria in 1902. On 15 December 1906 he was seconded for service on the staff and was appointed as a deputy assistant adjutant general. In April 1908 he served as an assistant military secretary to Lieutenant General Sir Arthur Paget, who had recently been placed in charge of Eastern Command.

On 14 August 1910 he was again seconded to serve on the staff. On 23 April 1912 he moved from his position as a GSO2 of the Southern Coast Defences to serve at the War Office.

== First World War ==
When the First World War began in the summer of 1914, he received permission to depart from the War Office and take charge of the 1st Division's 114th Field Battery, part of the 25th Brigade Royal Field Artillery, then serving with the British Expeditionary Force (BEF). While serving with his unit, he was involved in the Retreat from Mons and the Battle of the Marne, facing intense combat during the Aisne crossing and the actions that followed.

By October, he had been chosen to act as a special liaison between Field Marshal Sir John French, commander-in-chief (C-in-C) of the BEF, and Lieutenant General Sir Douglas Haig, then commanding I Corps of the BEF, moving on from his battery just as the First Battle of Ypres was taking place. He was promoted to lieutenant colonel on 30 October.

He was then seconded from the artillery and appointed as a general staff officer, grade 1 (GSO1) of the 13th (Western) Division of Kitchener's Army and returned home to help oversee their training in January 1915. The next month he was made a Companion of St Michael and St George (CMG). He deployed to Gallipoli with them in the summer, where he spent a month in the Helles trenches and all of August at Anzac, a period in which the division took heavy casualties while supporting the Suvla landing.

On 10 October, Gillman stepped into the role of brigadier general, Royal Artillery (BGRA) for the IX Corps, and was promoted to the temporary rank of brigadier general while employed in this role. However, he soon moved to the staff of General Sir Charles Monro as brigadier general, general staff (BGGS) when the latter took over from General Sir Ian Hamilton as C-in-C of the Mediterranean Expeditionary Force (MEF). In this capacity, he played a major part in coordinating the evacuation of Allied forces from Gallipoli and was later rewarded with a promotion to brevet colonel on 2 February 1916, "for Distinguished Service in the Field", although this was later antedated to 1 January.

As the forces were being reorganized in Egypt following the Gallipoli withdrawal, Gillman was dispatched to Mesopotamia in February 1916 to serve as a liaison between the War Office and the local forces there, arriving in time for the final attempts to relieve Kut.

During his journey home in May, he was redirected from Egypt to the Macedonian front to become major general, general staff (MGGS), under Lieutenant General George Milne, a fellow artilleryman, who took command of the British Salonika Army (BSA) that same month. He was promoted to temporary major general on 16 October, although this was antedated to 25 June and he became the BSA's chief of the general staff (CGS) He was appointed a Companion of the Order of the Bath (CB) in January 1917.

He stayed in Salonika until August 1917, at which point he was picked to lead the 17th Indian Division back in Mesopotamia. However, following the death of Lieutenant General Sir Stanley Maude, C-in-C of the Mesopotamian Expeditionary Force (MEF), he was instead named chief of the general staff (CGS) to Maude's successor, Lieutenant General Sir William Marshall, a position he maintained from December 1917 until the conflict ended.

After his rank of major general became substantive in June 1918, Gillman finally returned home in March 1919 to take command of the Catterick Camp demobilization centre. For his wartime contributions, he was appointed a Knight Commander of the Order of St Michael and St George (KCMG) in June.

== Post-war and final years ==
On 15 June 1919 he was made a commander and on 28 July was again made a commander.

In September 1920 he became commandant of the Royal Military Academy, Woolwich, taking over from Colonel Geoffrey White. He held this post until becoming inspector of artillery at the War Office in April 1924. After being promoted to lieutenant general in November 1926, and spent three months in Singapore assessing the defence capability of the Naval Base there in 1927. He succeeded General Sir Noel Birch as Master-General of the Ordnance at the War Office on 1 October 1927.

On 8 March 1930 he was appointed colonel commandant of the Royal Artillery, in succession to Major General Sir Walter Lindsay who had just died. Finally, on 1 March 1931, he was appointed as general officer commanding-in-chief (GOC-in-C) of Eastern Command, taking over from General Sir Robert Whigham, and was promoted to general in July 1931. He died in office in 1933.

Military offices
| Preceded by Geoffrey White | Commandant of the Royal Military Academy Woolwich; 1920–1924 | Succeeded by Ronald Charles |
| Preceded by Sir Noel Birch | Master-General of the Ordnance; 1927–1931 | Succeeded by Sir Ronald Charles |
| Preceded by Sir Robert Whigham | GOC-in-C Eastern Command; 1931–1933 | Succeeded by Sir Cyril Deverell |
