= Sebastian Evans =

English political activist (1830–1909)

Sebastian Evans (2 March 1830 – 19 December 1909) was an English journalist and political activist, known also as a man of letters and an artist. He helped to form the National Union of Conservative Associations.

== Life ==
Born on 2 March 1830 at Market Bosworth, Leicestershire, he was the youngest son of Arthur Benoni Evans by his wife Anne, daughter of Captain Thomas Dickinson, R.N. Sir John Evans was his elder brother and the poet Anne Evans his elder sister. After early education under his father at the Market Bosworth grammar school, he won a scholarship in 1849 at Emmanuel College, Cambridge, graduating B.A. in 1853 and proceeding M.A. in 1857.

On leaving university, Evans became a student at Lincoln's Inn on 29 January 1855, but was shortly appointed secretary of the Indian Reform Association, and in that capacity was the first man in England to receive news of the Indian Rebellion of 1857. That year he resigned the secretaryship and turned a talent for drawing to use, becoming manager of the art department of the glass-works of Messrs. Chance Bros. & Co., at Oldbury, near Birmingham. This position he held for ten years and designed many windows, including one depicting the Robin Hood legend for the International Exhibition of 1862.

While working for the Indian Reform Association, Evans had met John Bright, and at Birmingham he made friends with Joseph Chamberlain. In 1867 Evans left the glassworks to become editor of the Birmingham Daily Gazette, a conservative paper. In 1868 he unsuccessfully contested Birmingham as a conservative in the general election and helped to form the National Union of Conservative Associations. In the same year he took the degree of LL.D. at Cambridge.

In 1870 Evans left the Gazette for a legal career. On 17 November 1873 he was called to the bar at Lincoln's Inn and joined the Oxford circuit. He built up a practice, but still wrote leading articles for The Observer and contributing articles and stories, mostly with a tendency to the supernatural, to Macmillan's and Longman's magazines. In 1878 he shared in founding The People, a weekly conservative paper and edited it for its first three years. He took over the editorship for a period of the Birmingham Daily Gazette, when its editor died the eve of the general election of 1886.

In the early 1890s, Evans became involved in the Neo-Jacobite Revival, joining the Order of the White Rose.

Evans knew leading literati of the mid-Victorian period and was later a close friend of Edward Burne-Jones, who illustrated his history of the "Graal". Towards the end of his life he retired to Abbot's Barton, Canterbury, where he died on 19 December 1909.

== Works ==
While an undergraduate Evans published a volume of sonnets on the death of the Duke of Wellington (1852). His other published collections of poems were:

- Brother Fabian's Manuscripts and other Poems, 1865.
- Songs and Etchings, 1871.
- In the Studio, a Decade of Poems, 1875.

He translated Francis of Assisi's 'Mirror of Perfection' (1898) and Geoffrey of Monmouth's History of the Kings of Britain (1904), and with his son Francis Lady Chillingham's House Party, adapted from Édouard Pailleron's Le Monde où l'on s'ennuie (1901). In 1881 he re-edited his father's Leicestershire Words for the English Dialect Society.

Evans was a translator in verse and prose from mediaeval French, Latin, Greek, and Italian. In 1898 he published The High History of the Holy Graal (new edit. 1910 in Everyman's Library), a version of the old French romance of Perlesvaus, as well as an original study of the legend in In Quest of the Holy Graal.

Evans exhibited at the Royal Academy and elsewhere pictures in oils, water colours and black and white, and practised wood-carving, engraving and book-binding.

== Family ==
In 1857 Evans married Elizabeth, youngest daughter of Francis Bennett-Goldney, one of the founders of the London Joint Stock Bank. Of two sons, Sebastian and Francis, the latter took the name Francis Bennett-Goldney, and went into politics.

== Notes ==
Attribution

This article incorporates text from a publication now in the public domain: Lee, Sidney, ed. (1912). "Evans, Sebastian". Dictionary of National Biography (2nd supplement). Vol. 1. London: Smith, Elder & Co.
