= Thomas Pullyson =

English draper and Lord Mayor of London

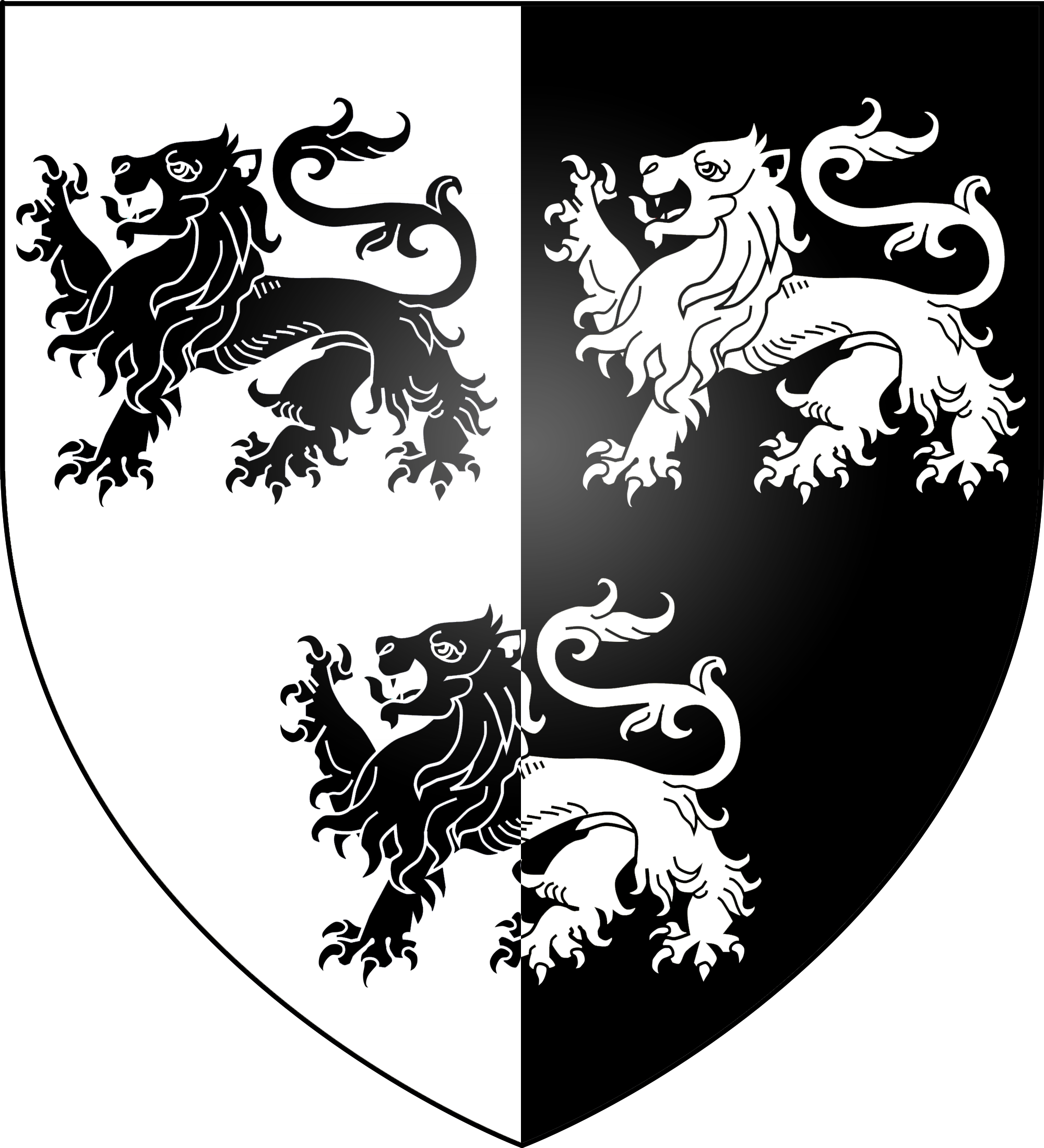
The arms of Thomas Pullyson, blazoned as Per pale argent and sable, three lions passant counterchanged

Thomas Pullyson (died 1617) was an English draper and Lord Mayor of London.

He was Sheriff of London in 1574 and then Lord Mayor for 1584, during the reign of Elizabeth I. He applied, unsuccessfully, for the theatres to be closed. He was succeeded by Wolstan Dixie.

== See also ==
- List of Lord Mayors of London
- List of Sheriffs of London
