= Wulfstan =

Wulfstan is a masculine given name which may refer to:

- Wulfstan of Hedeby, late 9th century European merchant and traveller
- Wulfstan (died 956), Archbishop of York (as Wulfstan I)
- Wulfstan the Cantor (fl. c. 1000), Anglo-Saxon monk and poet
- Wulfstan (died 1023), Bishop of Worcester (as Wulfstan I), Bishop of London and Archbishop of York (as Wulfstan II)
- Wulfstan (died 1095), Bishop of Worcester (as Wulfstan II), also known as Saint Wulfstan

== See also ==
- Wolstan, an unusual alternate spelling of the given name
- Weohstan, ealdorman of Wiltshire (died 802)
