= Bosworth Academy =

UK secondary school

Location
- Leicester Lane; Leicester, Leicestershire, LE9 9JL; England; 52°37′33″N 1°17′12″W

Information
- Type: Academy
- Motto: 'To Learn, To Achieve'
- Established: 1969
- Local authority: Leicestershire
- Department for Education URN: 137969 Tables
- Ofsted: Reports
- Executive Head: Chris Parkinson
- Head of School: Simon Brown
- Gender: Coeducational
- Age: 11 to 19
- Enrolment: 1202
- Colours: Green, yellow, blue, purple, black, grey and orange
- Website: http://www.bosworthacademy.org.uk

Bosworth Academy (formerly Bosworth Community College) is a coeducational secondary school located in Desford, Leicestershire, England and is part of the LiFE Multi-Academy Trust. It was a Sports College under the UK's Specialist School Programme, a status which was attained in 2003. The majority of students transfer to the school at the age of 11 from Primary Schools within the catchment area.

The Executive Headteacher of the LiFE Multi-Academy Trust is Chris Parkinson and the Head of School for Bosworth Academy is Simon Brown.

== History ==
The school moved to its present site at Desford in 1969 as "The Bosworth School and Community College". Its predecessor was the Dixie Grammar School in nearby Market Bosworth, with a tradition dating back to the 11th century. Timothy Rogers was appointed headmaster of the Dixie in 1964, oversaw the move to Desford, and continued as Bosworth's headmaster (later principal) until his retirement in 1983. In 2010 a new construction block was built.

In 2003, the school became a Specialist Sports College and as a result enabled Market Bosworth High School and Winstanley Community College to follow suit. This was followed in 2011, with the school becoming a Trust School in partnership with Leicester University, Leicester City Football Club, Stephenson College, the Primary Care Trust, Yorkshire Bank and the Local Authority. In April 2012, the school achieved academy status as an independent entity supporting the local schools.

There was previously a Barbara Hepworth sculpture situated outside the front main entrance, the whereabouts of which are currently unknown. It is understood that the Bernard Schottlander sculpture (3B Series No.2) in the quadrangle remains in situ.

The school was last inspected by OFSTED in 2017 when it achieved 'Outstanding'.

In 2018, the school was accredited the World Class Schools Quality Mark.

== Notable former pupils ==
- Josh Cobb - Leicestershire cricketer
- Jake Dennis - racing driver
- Mark Goodwin - Leicester City footballer
- Tamsin Greenway - England netball international
- Jinnwoo - musician/artist
- Jenny Maxwell - Scotland women's rugby union and 7s international
- Lee Noble - founder of Noble Automotive
- Emily Scarratt - England women's rugby union international
- Kraig Thornber - actor and choreographer
- Colin Pitchfork - the first person convicted of murder based on DNA fingerprinting evidence
- Philip Williamson - historian
