= Dixie baronets =

Extinct baronetcy in the Baronetage of England

- Escutcheon of the Dixie baronets of Market Bosworth
- Creation date: 1660
- Status: extinct
- Extinction date: 1975
- Seat: Bosworth Hall
- Motto: Quod dixi dixi, What I have said, I have said; Dei gratia grata, The grace of God is grateful
- Arms: Azure, a lion rampant or, a chief of the last
- Crest: An ounce sejant proper ducally gorged or

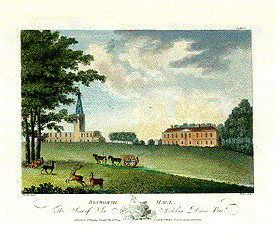
Bosworth Hall in Leicestershire

The Dixie Baronetcy was created in the Baronetage of England at the time of the Restoration of the Monarchy in 1660 for Sir Wolstan Dixie (1602–1682), a supporter of King Charles I during the English Civil War and afterwards. He was descended from a brother of Sir Wolstan Dixie, the sixteenth century Lord Mayor of London who founded the Dixie Professorship of Ecclesiastical History in the University of Cambridge. Their home was Bosworth Hall near Market Bosworth in Leicestershire. The title became extinct with the death of the thirteenth Baronet, another Sir Wolstan Dixie, in 1975.

Sir Wolstan Dixie of Market Bosworth (1576 – 25 July 1650), great-nephew of the first Sir Wolstan Dixie, and father of the 1st Baronet. Knighted by King James I in 1604, then of Appleby Magna. In 1608 he moved to Market Bosworth and began work on the original manor house and Dixie Grammar School. In 1614 he was High Sheriff of Leicestershire and in 1625 its representative in Parliament.

== The loss of the Bosworth Estate ==
"Sir (Alexander) Beaumont (Churchill Dixie, 11th Baronet)'s temperament was neither rationalistic nor tolerant. Described as "a spendthrift, a hopeless gambler, a heavy drinker" he found it increasingly difficult to face up to his responsibilities as Squire of Bosworth. Lady Florence wrote "For some time past I have been fighting against the terrible consequences of my husband's immense losses on the Turf and at gambling . . It was a great blow to me to find that the last remnant of a once splendid fortune must at once go to pay this debt. Ruin ... Beau ... has been so accustomed to have heaps of money at his command that he cannot understand that it is all gone .... By selling Bosworth and the property these (debts) could be met"

"Machell, from the exigencies of his profession, was unquestionably the ruin of numerous aspiring punters whose interests clashed with his own. Beaumont Dixie, whose inclinations tended towards always backing "Archer's mounts", was a notable example, and anyone who witnessed the scene in the paddock after a race where Machell's horse did not win, will not be likely to forget the ruined Baronet wringing his hands in despair, and the irate owner standing over him with "Now, Mr Bastard Beaumont Dixie, I'll teach you to back Archer's mounts" Fred Archer was a champion jockey who mainly rode horses trained by Mathew and George Dawson.

The 11th Baronet sold the estate in 1885.

== List of Dixie baronets of Market Bosworth ==
- Sir Wolstan Dixie, 1st Baronet (before 3 October 1602 – 13 February 1682) married (firstly) Barbara, daughter and heiress of Sir Henry Beaumont, Bart. of Gracedieu, Leicester, son of francis beaumont and widow of John Harpur; and (secondly) Frances, daughter of Edward Hersilridge, Esq. Barbara Beaumont was her father's sole heiress and represented a Leicestershire family which claimed descent from the House of Plantagenet. The first Baronet died in 1682 at the age of eighty and was succeeded by his eldest son
- Sir Beaumont Dixie, 2nd Baronet (1629–1692) married Mary, daughter and sole heiress of Sir William Willoughby of Selston, Nottinghamshire, and was the builder of Bosworth Hall. He died in 1692 and was succeeded by his eldest son
- Sir Wolstan Dixie, 3rd Baronet (1667 – December 1713) married Rebecca (died 1744), daughter of Sir Richard Atkins, Bart. The 3rd Baronet died in December 1713 and was succeeded by his eldest son
- Sir Wolstan Dixie, 4th Baronet (1700–1767) who married firstly, 1 May 1735, Anna (died July 1739), heiress of Tobias Freer, Governor of Barbados; secondly, Theodosia (died 14 May 1751), daughter of Henry Offley Wright, Esq.; and thirdly Margaret, daughter of William Cross, gent. This Sir Wolstan was a colourful character. One story which is told of him is that he strongly objected to men with waggons driving across his park, and a neighbouring squire, Wrightson Mundy of Osbaston Hall, dressed up as a waggoner, was warned off by Dixie, and they fought. When Dixie was later presented to King George II, he asked "Bosworth, Bosworth. Big battle at Bosworth, wasn’t it?" and Dixie replied "Yes, sire. But I thrashed him." The 4th Baronet died in 1767 and was succeeded by his son. This is the baronet who employed Samuel Johnson during his four months at Bosworth in 1732. He was Sheriff of Leicestershire in 1727.
- Sir Wolstan Dixie, 5th Baronet (9 March 1737 – 12 January 1806) declared insane in 1785 by an action in Chancery (thus breaking the entail) who died unmarried 'far from home in a London lunatic asylum’ in 1806, and was succeeded by his cousin
- Sir Beaumont Joseph Dixie, 6th Baronet RN (?–20 July 1814) grandson of the Rev. Beaumont Dixie, second son of the third Baronet, he was a prisoner of war in France from 1802 to 1814 and died unmarried at Bosworth House in 1814, six days after his return from France, and was succeeded by his brother
- Sir William Willoughby Wolstan Dixie, 7th Baronet (−26 October 1827) married 21 November 1815 Bella-Anna (died 1820), daughter of the Rev. Thomas Adnutt, Rector of Croft, Leicestershire. He died in 1827 and was succeeded by his eldest son
- Sir Willoughby Wolstan Dixie, 8th Baronet (16 October 1816 – 23 July 1850) married, 16 March 1841, Louisa-Anne, a daughter of Lieutenant-General Sir Evan Lloyd KCH and Alicia, widow of Nicholas Barnewall, 14th Baron Trimlestown, by whom he had three daughters. He died in 1850 and was succeeded by his uncle, the brother of the 6th and 7th Baronets
- Sir Alexander Dixie, 9th Baronet (1780 – December 1857), Captain RN, died 1857 and was succeeded by his eldest son
- Sir Alexander Beaumont Churchill Dixie, 10th Baronet (24 December 1819 – 1872) was a Doctor of Medicine and a Justice of the Peace for Leicestershire. The 10th Baronet died in 1872 and was succeeded by his eldest son
- Sir Alexander Beaumont Churchill Dixie, 11th Baronet (22 December 1851 – 1924), who married the travel writer and feminist Lady Florence Douglas, 3 April 1875. He died in 1924 and was succeeded by his eldest son. Sold Bosworth Hall to Charles Tollemache Scott.
- Sir Douglas Dixie, 12th Baronet (18 January 1876 – 25 December 1948) After serving in the Royal Navy as a midshipman, he was commissioned into the King's Own Scottish Borderers in 1895 and married Margaret Lindsay, daughter of Sir A Jardine, 8th Baronet. He was promoted a temporary captain in the 5th Battalion the KOSB, on 26 November 1914. He died in 1948 and was succeeded by his son
- Sir Wolstan Dixie, 13th Baronet (8 January 1910 – 28 December 1975), who married twice and had two daughters. With his death in 1975, the title became extinct. The 13th Baronet wrote an autobiography, published in 1972, called Is it True What They Say About Dixie? The Second Battle of Bosworth
- In 1976, his eldest daughter Eleanor claimed that the title should be passed through the female line on the grounds of the Sex Discrimination Act of 1975 (repealed 2010) but the claim has not yet been settled.

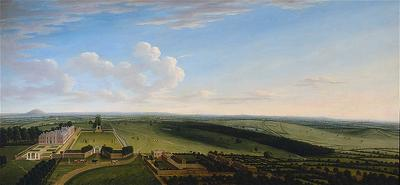
Bosworth Hall and Park, c. 1725
