= Wolstan Dixie =

English merchant and administrator

Sir Wolstan Dixie
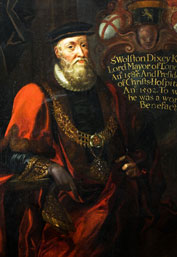
- Sir Wolstan Dixie in the furred red gown and chain of his office, artist unknown, Christ's Hospital, near Horsham, West Sussex

Lord Mayor of London
- In office 1585–1586
- Preceded by: Thomas Pullyson
- Succeeded by: George Barne

Personal details
- Born: 1524/1525
- Died: 1594

Sir Wolstan Dixie (1524/1525 – 1594) was an English merchant and administrator, and Lord Mayor of London in 1585.

== Life ==
He was the son of Thomas Dixie and Anne Jephson, who lived at Catworth in Huntingdonshire. Wolstan was the fourth son of his father, and went into business. He appears to have been apprenticed to Sir Christopher Draper of the Ironmongers' Company, who was lord mayor in 1566, and whose daughter and coheiress, Agnes, he married. Sir Christopher was of Melton Mowbray in Leicestershire, and Dixie later held property in that county. He was a freeman of the Skinners' Company, was elected alderman of Broad Street ward 4 February 1573–4, and became one of the sheriffs of London in 1575, when his colleague was Edward Osborne.

In 1585 he became lord mayor, and his installation was greeted by one of the earliest city pageants now extant, the words being composed by George Peele. An actor portrayed a "Moor", a North African man, riding on a lynx, who gave the first speech. He was followed by children representing London, Magnamity, Loyalty, Country, and other subjects, and four nymphs, who all recited verses.

On 8 February 1592 he became alderman of St. Michael Bassishaw ward in exchange for that of Broad Street. He was an active magistrate and charitable citizen, and died on 8 January 1594. After his death, his widow Agnes married William Hickman, the son of Rose Lok and Anthony Hickman.

== Legacy ==
Agnes Draper is said to have been his second wife; his first was named Walkedon, but he left no family by either. He possessed not only the manor of Bosworth, which he had purchased in 1567 from Henry Hastings, 3rd Earl of Huntingdon, but of other lands and tenements in Bosworth, Gilmorton, Coton (Leicestershire), Carleton, Osbaston, Bradley (Leicestershire) and North Kilworth. These estates devolved upon his brother Richard, except the manor of Bosworth, which he settled upon Richard's grandson, his own great-nephew, Wolstan. Dixie was buried in the parish church of St. Michael Bassishaw. His heir, Sir Wolstan Dixie of Appleby Magna, was knighted, made High Sheriff of Leicestershire in 1614, and elected M.P. for the county in 1625. Sir Wolstan's son, yet another Wolstan, was a well-known royalist and made a baronet on 4 July 1660.

Dixie left large charitable bequests to institutions in London:

- an annuity to Christ's Hospital, of which he was elected president in 1590;
- a fund for establishing a divinity lecture at the church of St. Michael Bassishaw, in which parish he resided; *to the Skinners' Company to lend at a low rate of interest to young merchants;
- annuities to St. Bartholomew's Hospital and St. Thomas's Hospital;
- money for the poor in Bridewell, Newgate Prison and the prisons in Southwark, for the two compters, and to Ludgate and Bedlam;
- to the strangers of the French and Dutch churches;
- towards building a pesthouse.

He had subscribed towards the building of the new Emmanuel College, Cambridge (1584), and in his will he left £600 to purchase land to endow two fellowships and two scholarships for the scholars of his new grammar school at Market Bosworth, now the Dixie Grammar School. The school plan was implemented by the second Sir Wolstan Dixie, his grand-nephew, Sheriff of Leicester. The fund for many years supported fellows and scholars, while the surplus was employed in purchasing livings. It was then from 1878 devoted to the foundation of a chair in ecclesiastical history. The Dixie Professorship of Ecclesiastical History is now one of the senior professorships in history at the University of Cambridge.

=== Portraits ===
- Portrait 1593, in ceremonial costume in the courtroom of Christ's Hospital, dated 1593, artist unknown.
- Engraving 1705, in Guildhall Library Print Room (k1229242)

== See also ==
- List of Lord Mayors of London
- Dixie baronets; his grand-nephew, the second Sir Wolstan Dixie of Appleby Magna, knighted 1604, in 1614 Sheriff of Leicester, was father to this line, many of them called Wolstan.
- Dixie Professor of Ecclesiastical History
- Appleby Magna
