= Royal Military Academy, Woolwich =

Military academy in Woolwich, in south-east London

Coordinates: 51°28′30″N 0°3′27″E

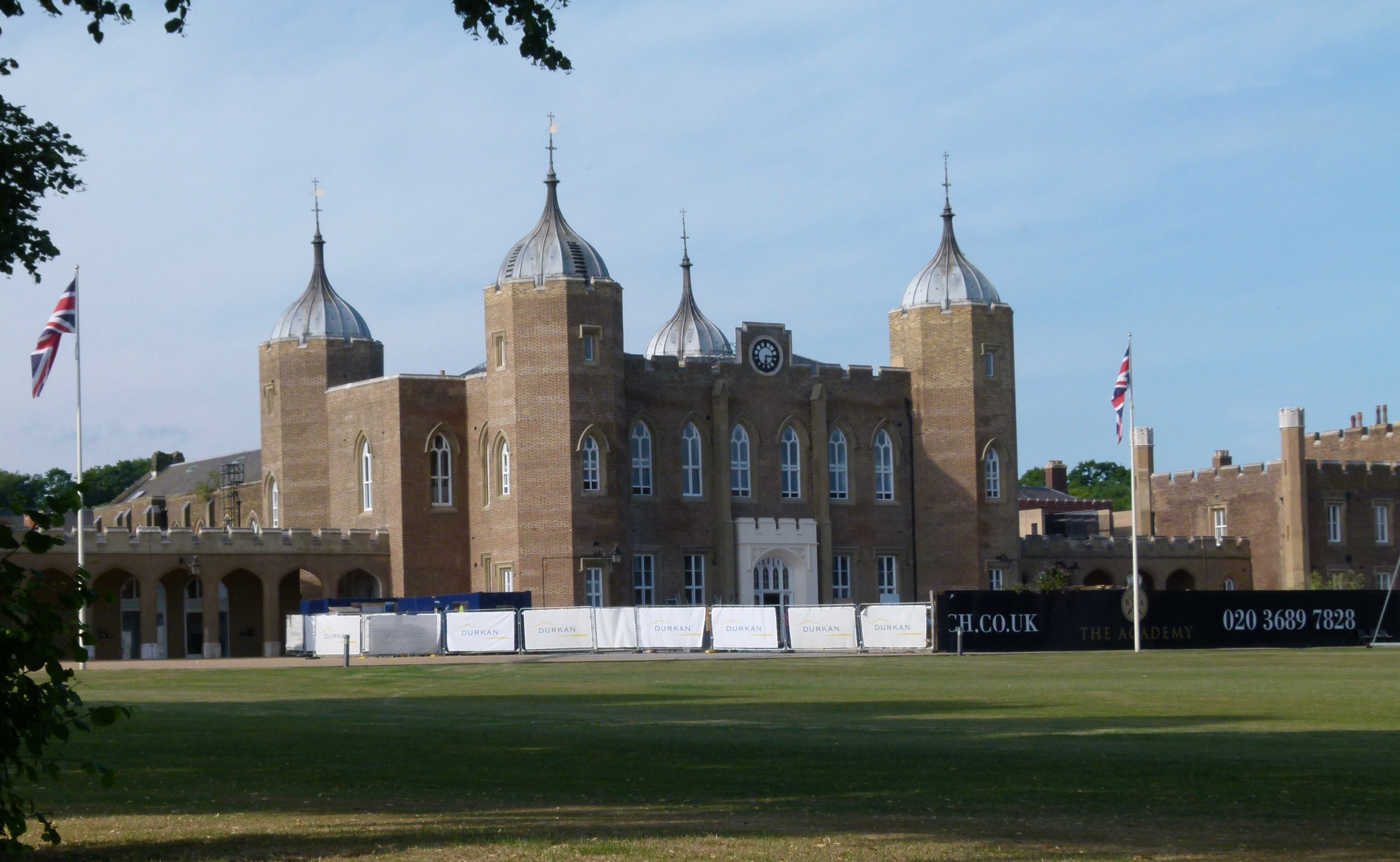
- The New Royal Military Academy, in use 1806 to 1939
- Other name: "The Shop"
- Type: Military academy
- Active: 1741–1939
- Affiliations: British Army
- Location: Woolwich, London, United Kingdom

The Royal Military Academy, Woolwich was a British military academy for the training of commissioned officers of the Royal Artillery and Royal Engineers. It was located in Woolwich, south-east London. It later also trained officers of the Royal Corps of Signals and other technical corps. RMA Woolwich was commonly known as "The Shop" because its first building was a converted workshop of the Woolwich Arsenal.

== History ==
=== Origins in the Royal Arsenal ===
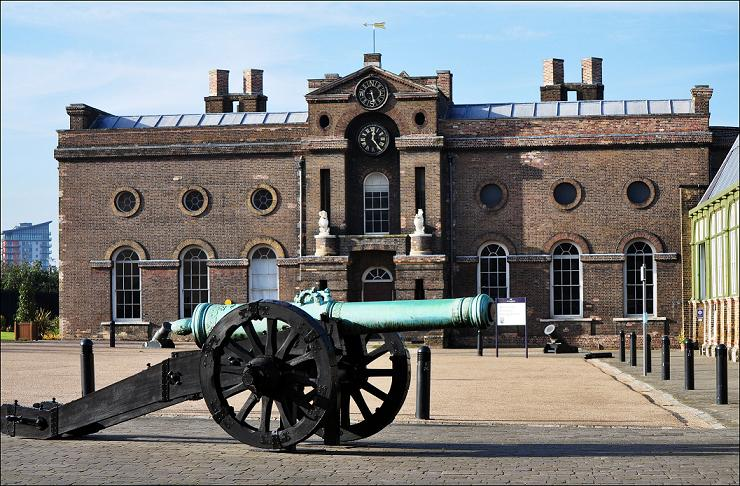
The Old Royal Military Academy, in use 1741–1806. The cadets were taught in the left-hand half of the building, the right providing a board room for the Board of Ordnance

An attempt had been made by the Board of Ordnance in 1720 to set up an academy within its Arsenal (then known as the Warren) to provide training and education for prospective officers of its new Regiment of Artillery and Corps of Engineers (both of which had been established there in 1716). A new building was being constructed in readiness for the Academy and funds had been secured, seemingly, through investment in the South Sea Company; but the latter's collapse led to plans for the Academy being placed on hold.

After this false start, the academy was opened by authority of a Royal Warrant in 1741: it was intended, in the words of its first charter, to produce "good officers of Artillery and perfect Engineers". Its 'gentlemen cadets' initially ranged in age from 10 to 30. To begin with they were attached to the marching companies of the Royal Artillery, but in 1744 they were formed into their own company, forty in number (enlarged to forty-eight, two years later) overseen by a captain-lieutenant. To begin with the cadets were accommodated in lodgings in the town of Woolwich, but this arrangement was deemed unsatisfactory (the cadets gained a reputation for riotousness) so in 1751 a Cadets' Barracks was built just within the south boundary wall of the Warren and the cadets had to adjust to a more strict military discipline. (The Cadets' Barracks was demolished in the 1980s for road widening.)

Education in the academy focused at first on mathematics and the scientific principles of gunnery and fortification; French was also taught, for a small fee. In addition to their theoretical studies, the cadets shared (with all ranks of the Artillery) in what was called 'the Practice' of gunnery, bridge building, magazine technique and artillery work. While an artillery officer attended each class to keep order, teaching in the academy was provided by civilians: a First Master (later called Professor of Fortification and Gunnery), a Second Master (later Professor of Mathematics) and additional tutors in French, Arithmetic, Classics and Drawing. In 1764 the Royal Academy (as it had been known) had the word 'Military' added to its title, and at the same time a senior officer was appointed to serve as Lieutenant-Governor (de facto head of the institution). Moreover, the institution was split: younger cadets entered the Lower Academy, where they were taught reading, writing, arithmetic, Latin, French and drawing. If they performed well in examinations they were allowed to proceed to the Upper Academy, where they learned military skills and sciences (as well as fencing and dancing – required skills for prospective officers).

=== Relocation to Woolwich Common ===
The possibility of moving the Royal Military Academy out of the Warren was mooted as early as 1783, as it was fast outgrowing the available accommodation. At first costs precluded this possibility, but (with the Academy continuing to grow) James Wyatt, the Board of Ordnance Architect, was commissioned to design a new complex of buildings to stand, on a site facing the Royal Artillery Barracks, at the southern edge of Woolwich Common; it was built between 1796 and 1805 and opened for use the following year.

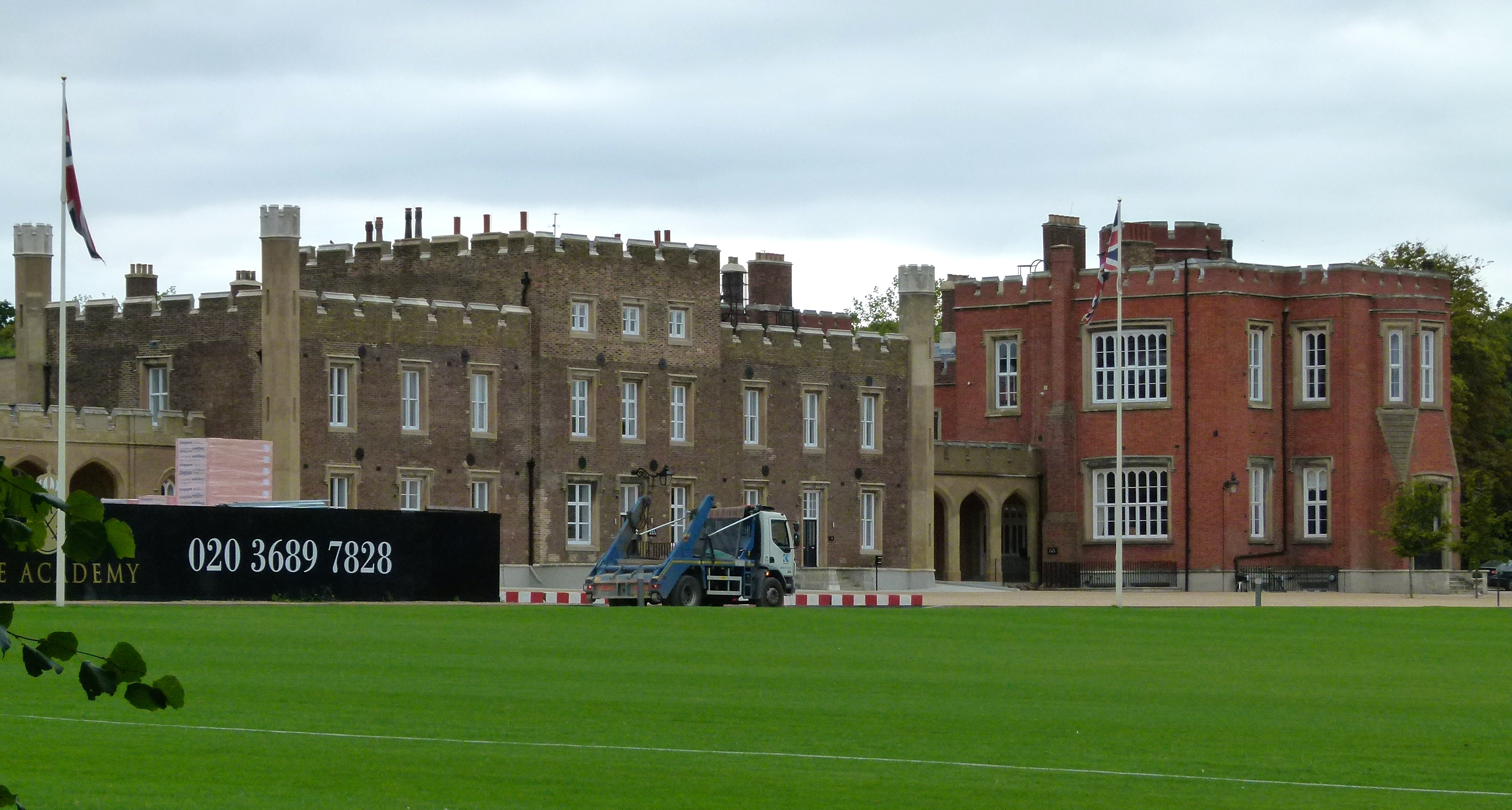
One of the original accommodation blocks (left) with 1862 addition alongside (right).

Wyatt's Academy was built of yellow brick in the Tudor Gothic style. It consisted of a central block (reminiscent of the Ordnance Board's headquarters in the Tower of London) flanked by a pair of accommodation blocks, linked by arcaded walkways. The central block contained classrooms, a library and offices; the accommodation blocks housed officers in the three-storey central sections and cadets in the two-storey wings. Behind the central block Wyatt placed a large dining hall flanked by spacious quadrangles having service buildings around the sides.

128 cadets moved to the new Academy: these comprised the four senior years. Of the younger cadets, sixty were kept at the Warren (by then renamed the Royal Arsenal) and another sixty were sent to a new college for junior cadets at Great Marlow. Practical teaching continued to be given in the working context of the Arsenal. In 1810, military cadets of the East India Company, who had previously been educated at the Academy, were moved to a new college at Addiscombe.

During the years that followed the status of the cadets changed: rather than being considered (albeit junior) military personnel, as had previously been the case, they were removed from the muster roll and they (or their parents) began to be charged fees for attendance. In this way the Academy took on something of the ethos of an English public school. In 1844 the Academy was described by Edward Mogg as accommodating:

about one hundred and thirty young gentlemen, the sons of military men, and the more respectable classes, who are here instructed in mathematics, land-surveying, with mapping, fortification, engineering, the use of the musket and sword exercise, and field-pieces; and for whose use twelve brass cannon, three-pounders, are placed in front of the building, practising with which they acquire a knowledge of their application in the field of battle. This department is under the direction of a lieutenant-general, an instructor, a professor of mathematics, and a professor of fortification; in addition to which there are French, German, and drawing masters.

Following the demise of the Board of Ordnance in the wake of the Crimean War the Academy was inspected by a commission which recommended changes: the minimum age for cadets was raised to fifteen and more specialist training was added. As part of these reforms the Academy complex was enlarged in the 1860s, with a view to accommodating all cadets on the same site (although some would remain in the Arsenal through to the 1880s): the frontage was extended with the addition of new pavilions at either end, in similar style to Wyatt's work but in red brick rather than yellow; William Jervois was the architect. These contained new classrooms, with accommodation provided in similar new blocks behind. Sports facilities were also added along with gun batteries for training. In 1873 Wyatt's central block had to be entirely rebuilt following a devastating fire. A new chiming clock was provided at this time by Gillett & Bland of Croydon; the movement and bells were placed in the north-east turret and connected by rods to the dial on the parapet.

==== Gallery ====
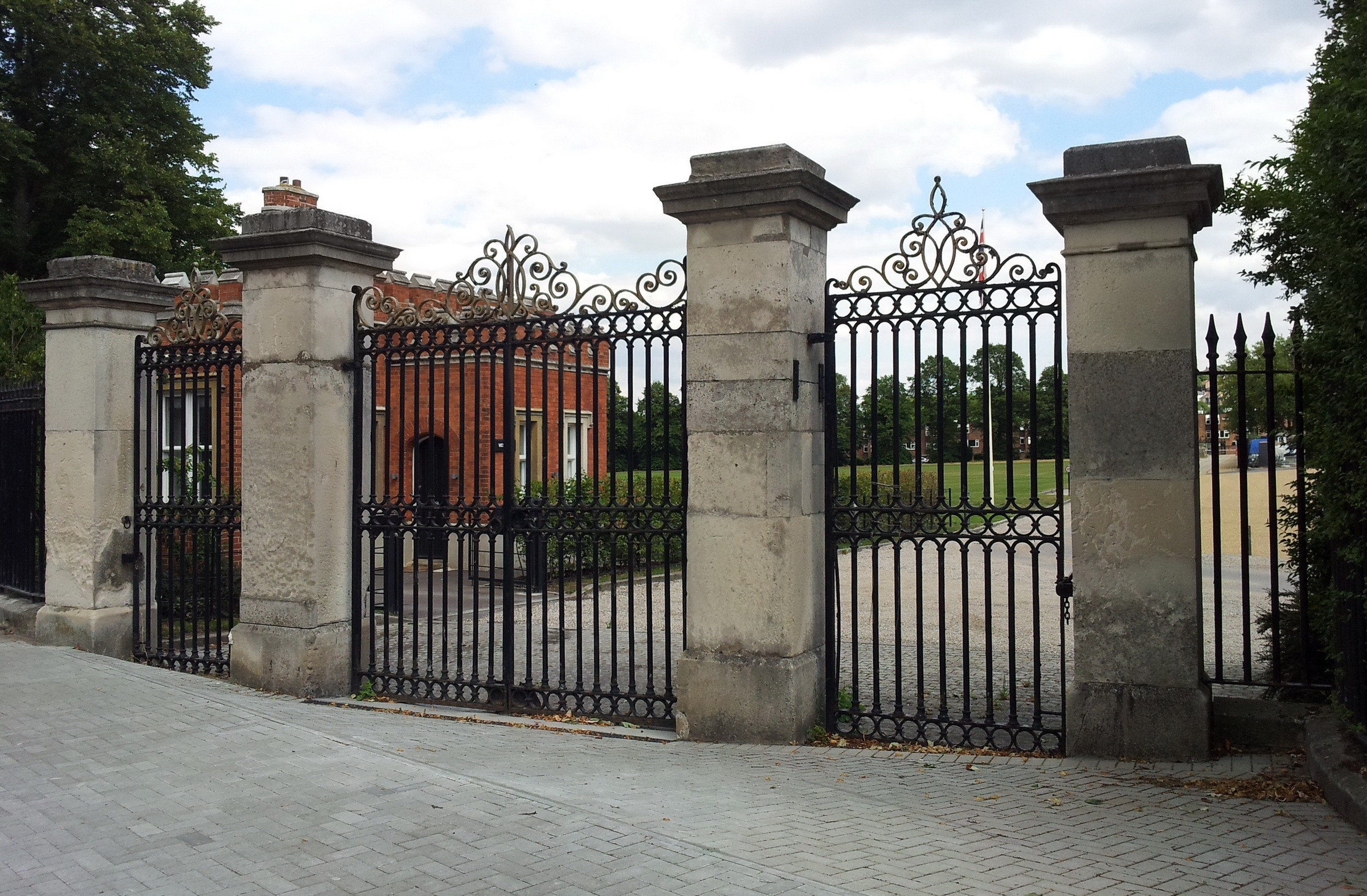
North-west Gate on Academy Road

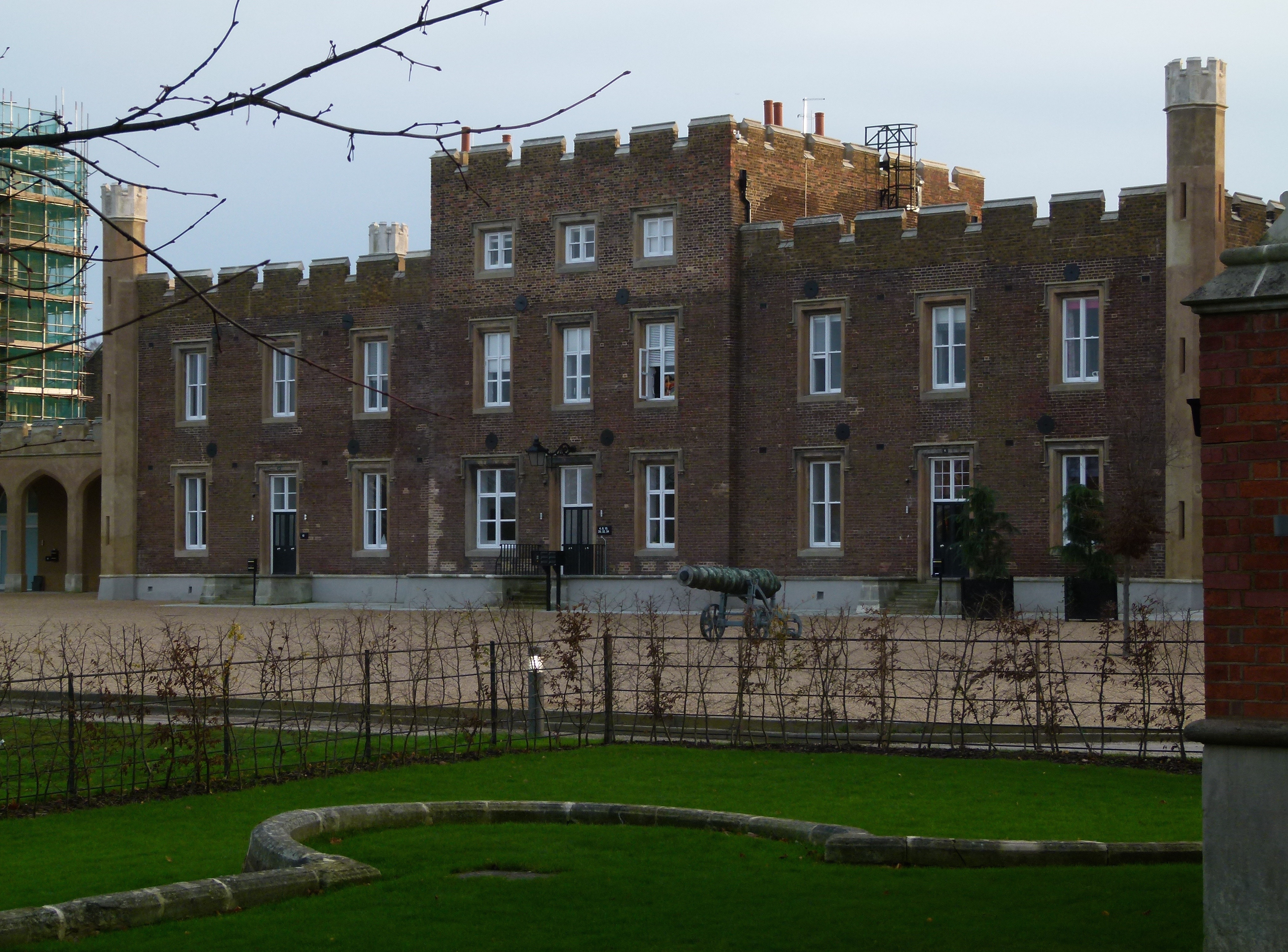
Accommodation block (1806)

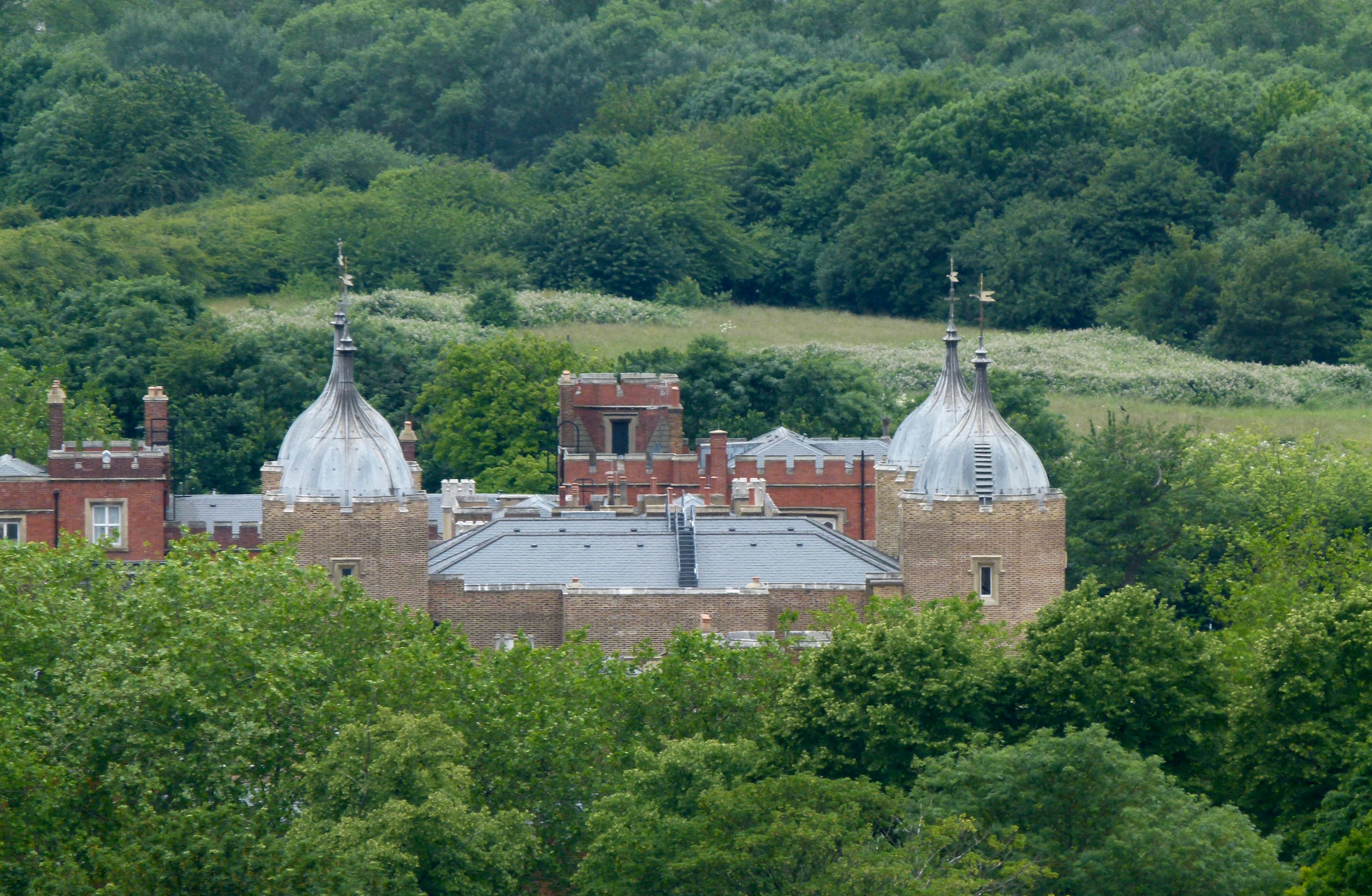
Roofs and turrets accommodation block (1806)

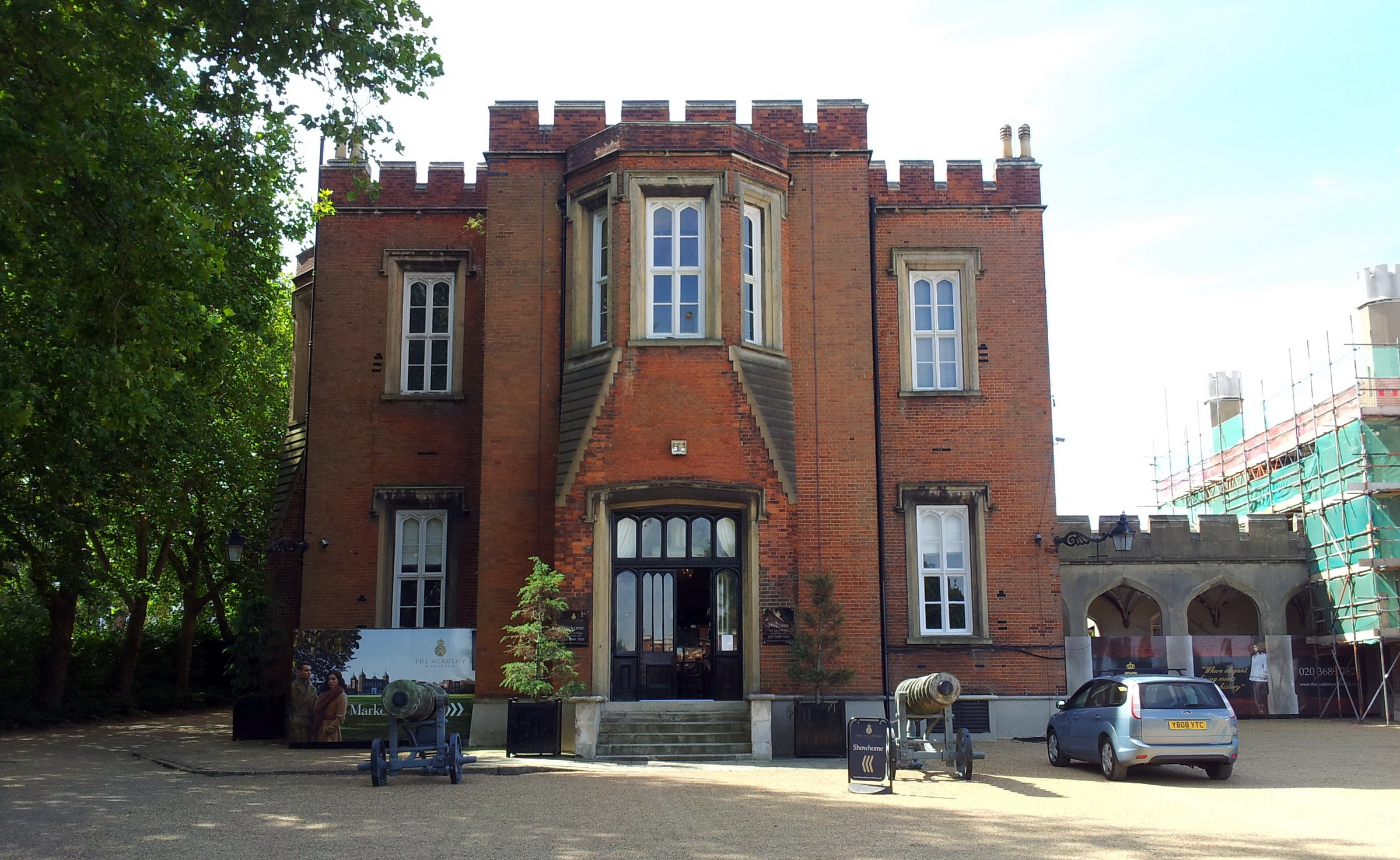
North-east accommodation block (1862) from the north

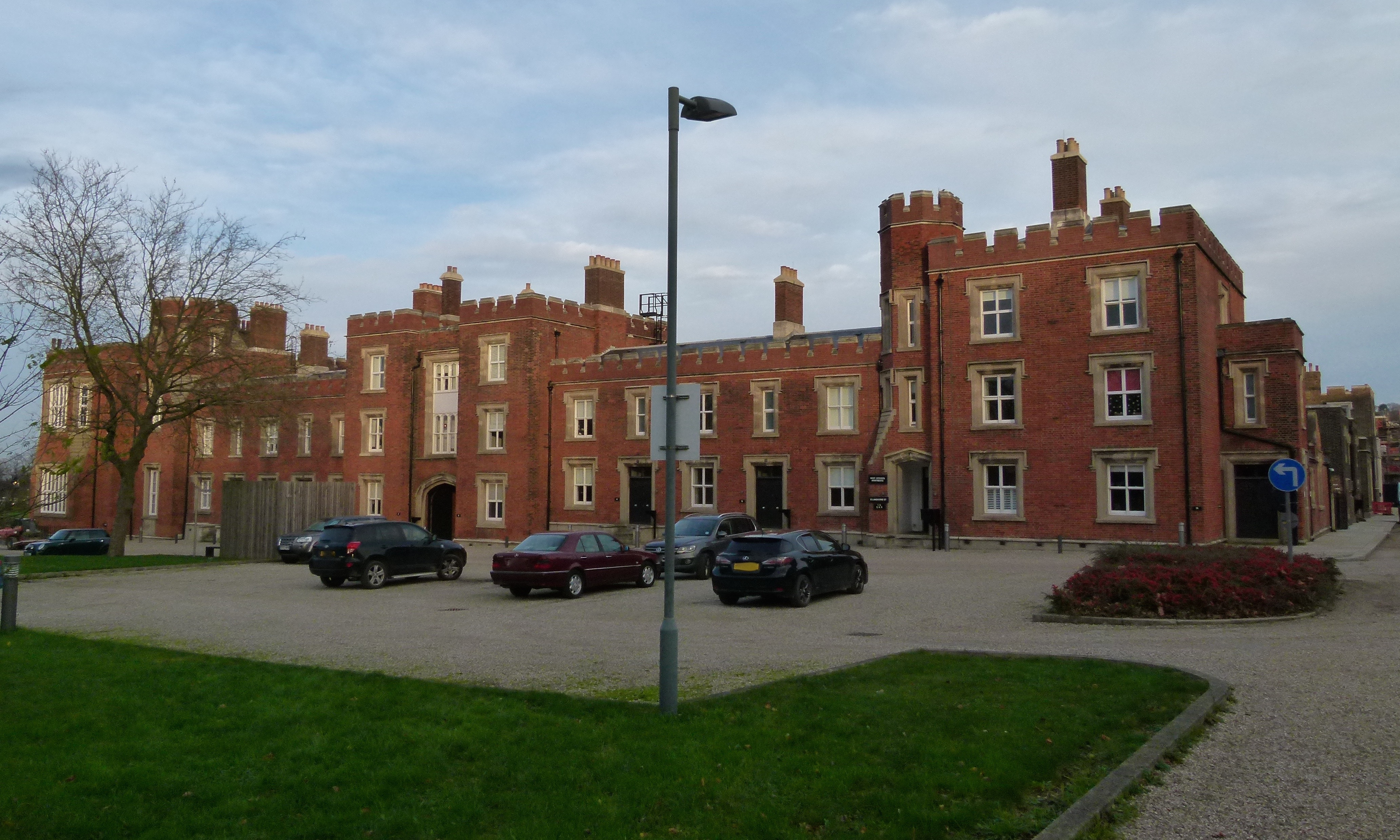
North-west accommodation block (1862) from the west

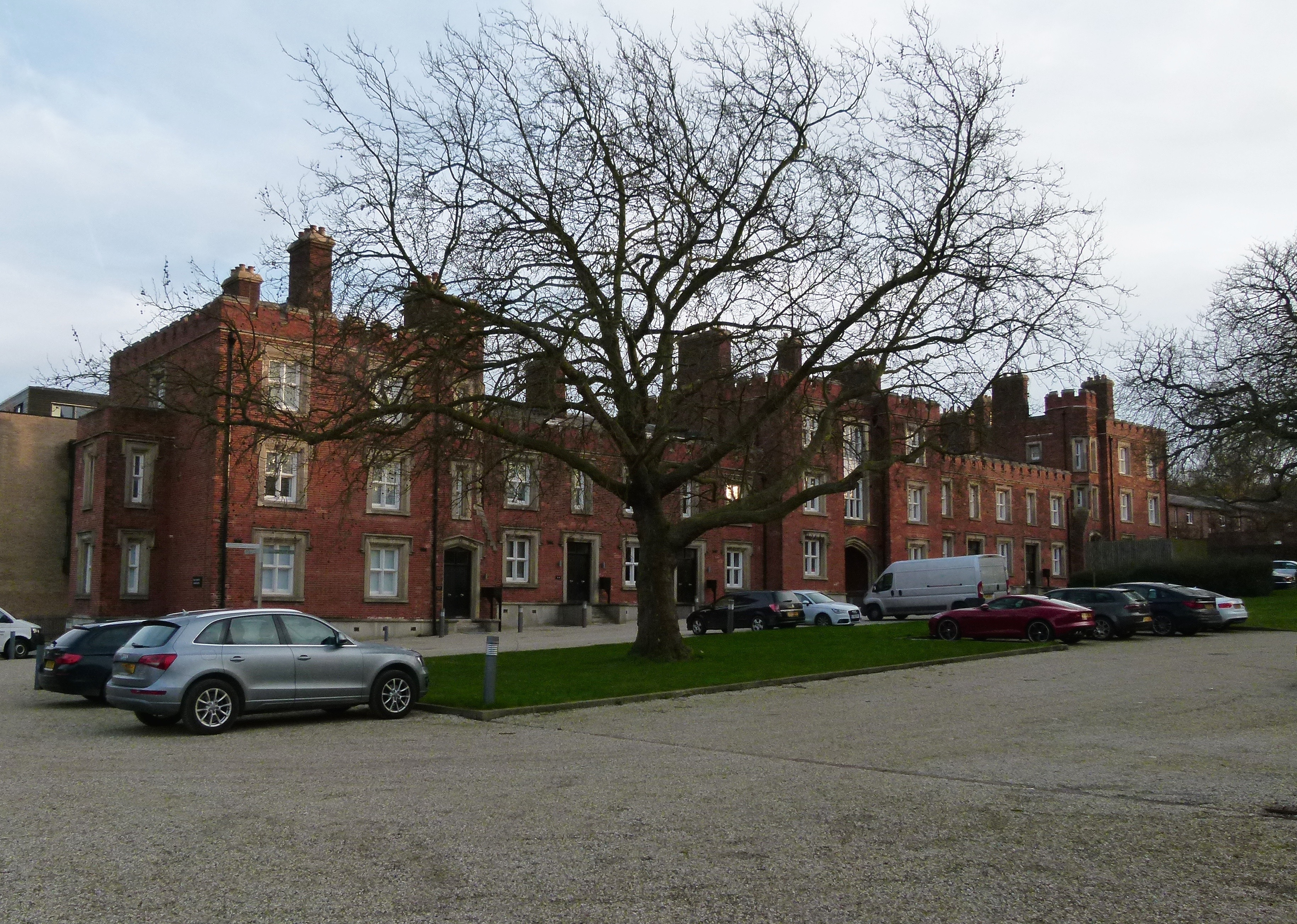
South-west accommodation block (1877)

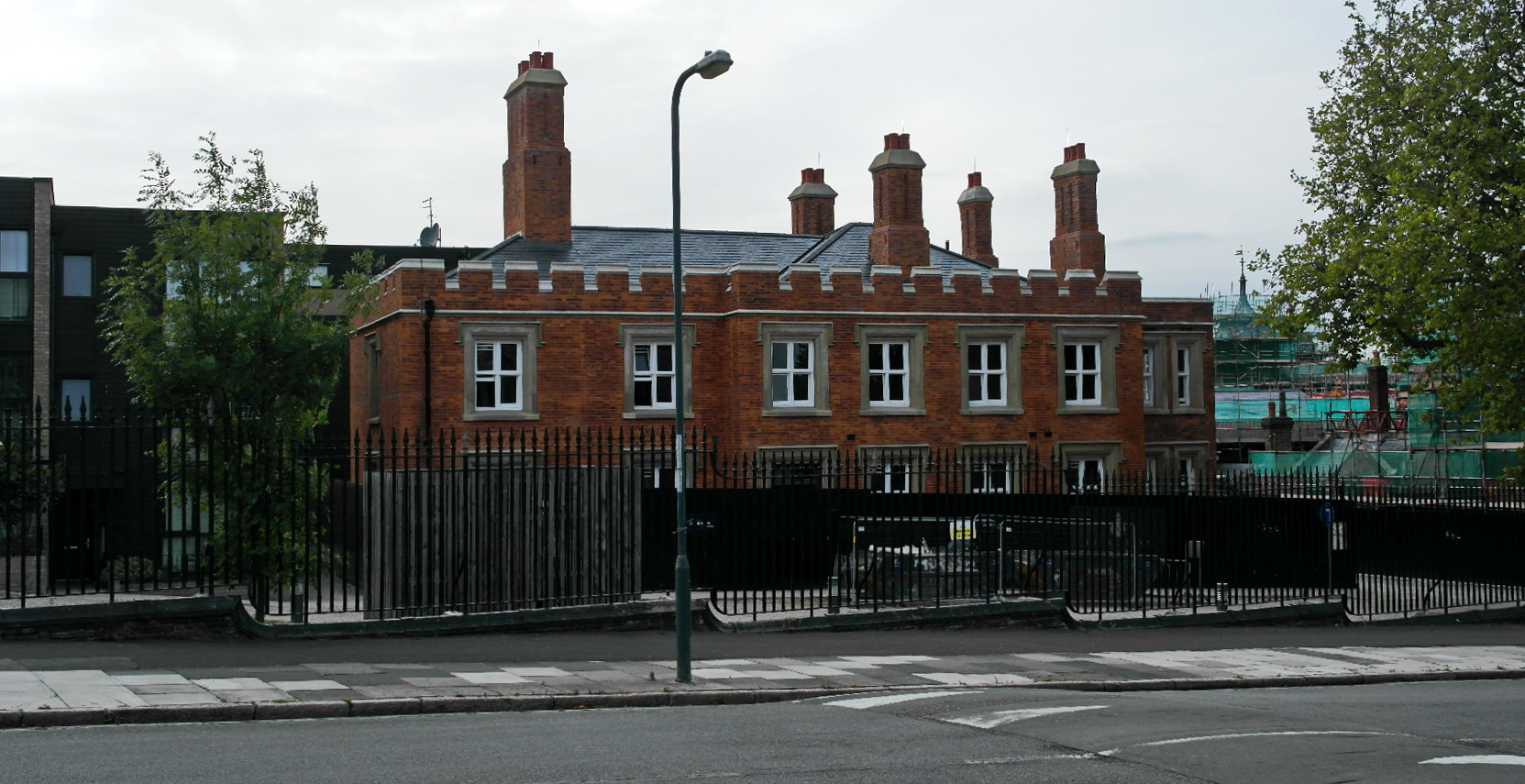
South-east accommodation block (1892)

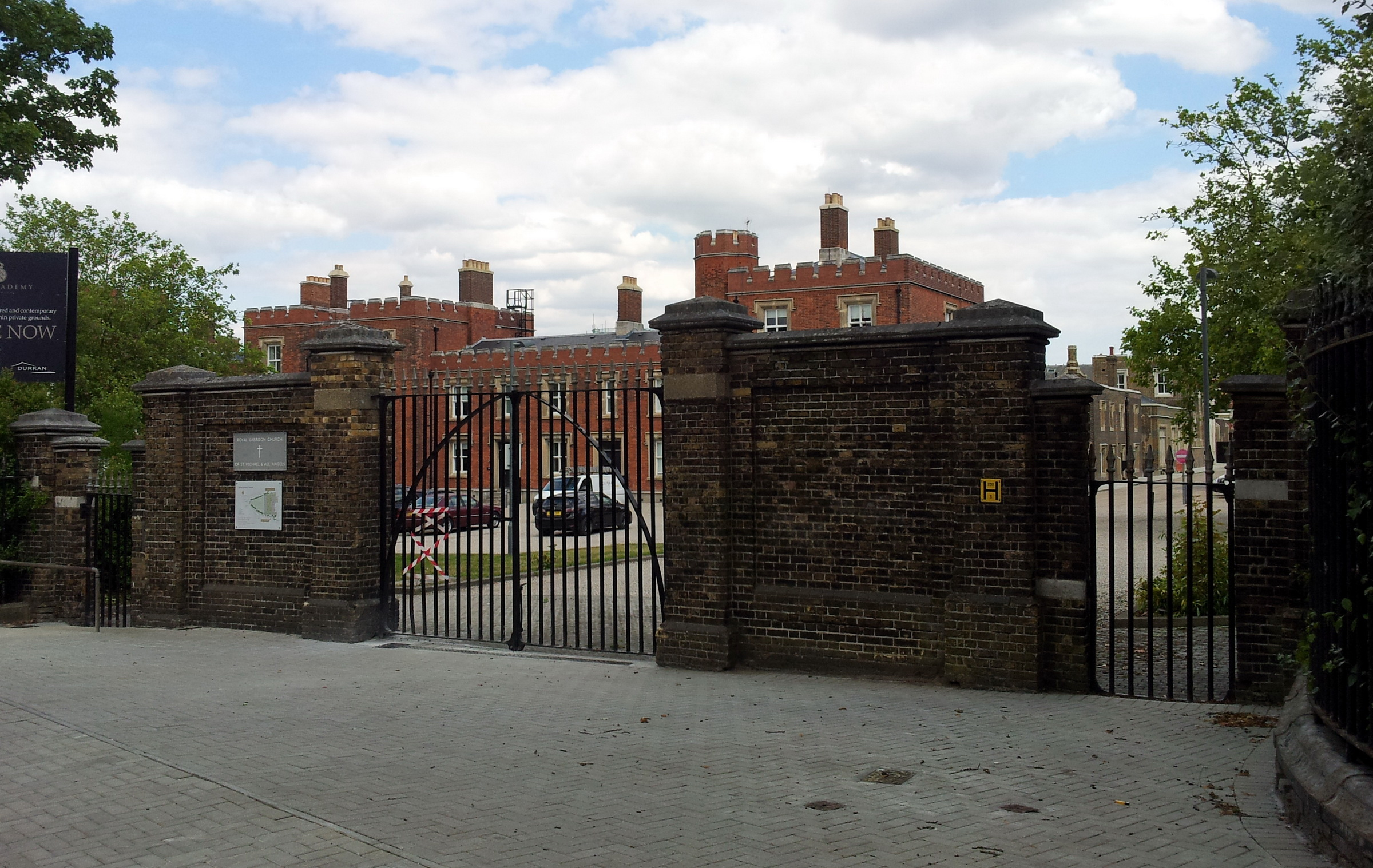
South-west Gate on Academy Road

=== Closure and aftermath ===
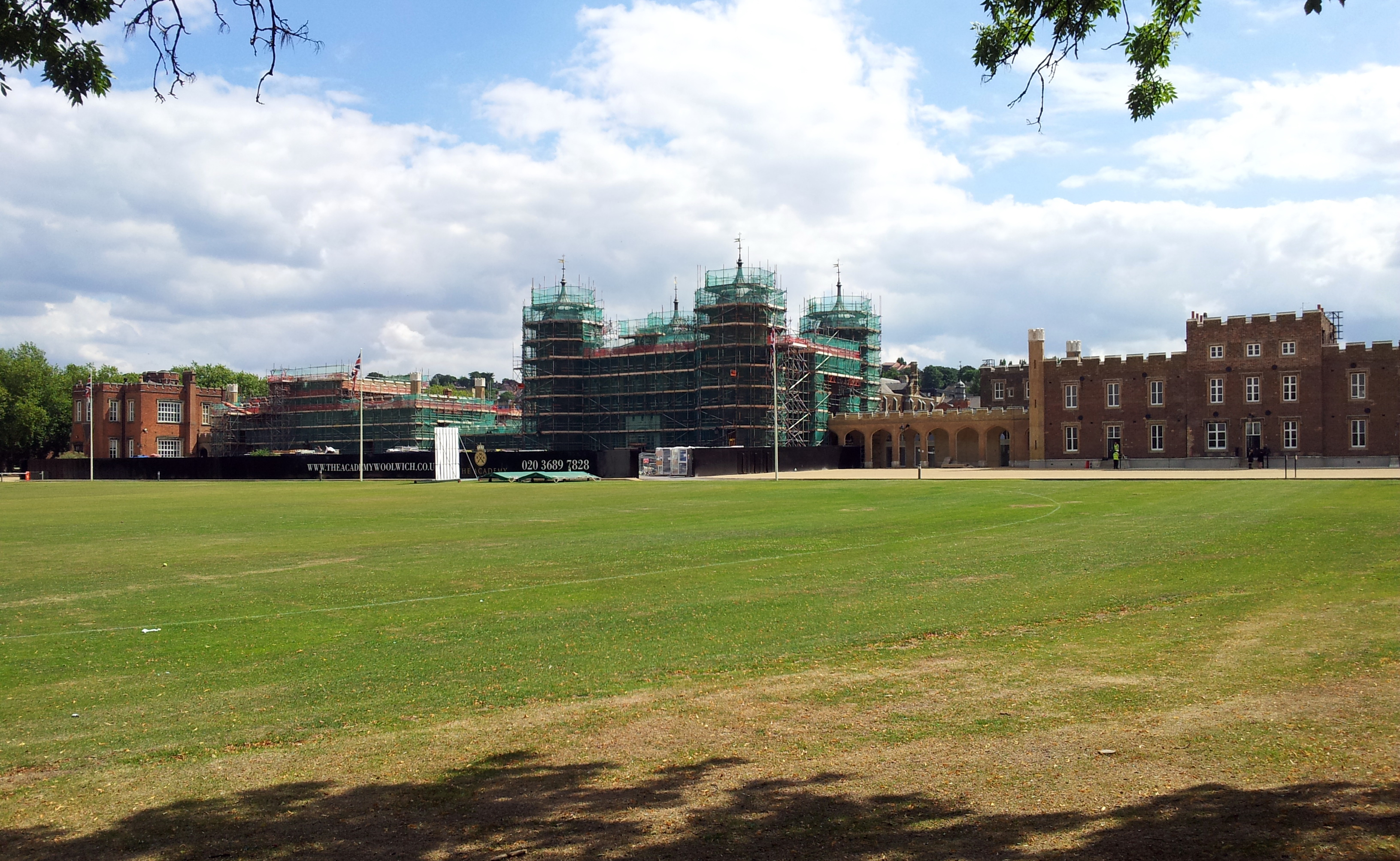
View from the north-west in 2015

Following the demise of the Board of Ordnance, Parliament had explored the possibility of a merger between the Royal Military Academy and the Royal Military College, Sandhurst (which only trained officers for the Infantry and Cavalry); although senior Army officers rejected the idea at the time it persisted into the twentieth century. Arguments in favour of a merger gained momentum in the 1920s when the specialist and scientific training which had been Woolwich's preserve began to be outsourced to other locations. In 1936 it was decided that the merger should take place; but the Second World War intervened and in 1939 both institutions closed as their cadets were called up for active service.

The Royal Military Academy Woolwich closed in 1939 and in 1947 the Royal Military Academy Sandhurst was formed on the site of the former Royal Military College with the objective of providing officer training for all arms and services.

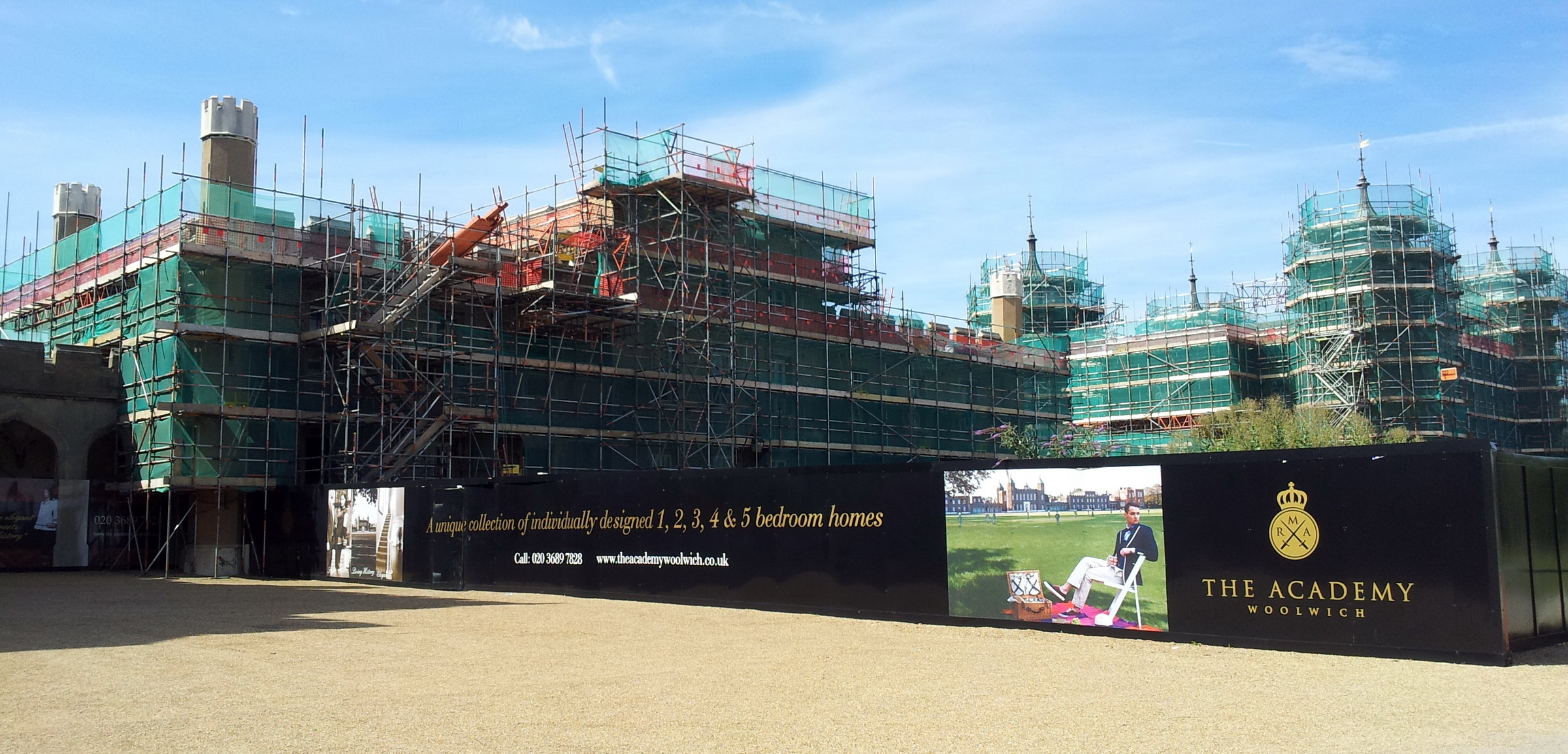
Refurbishment of the site underway in 2015

Thereafter, the old Academy site became part of Woolwich Garrison, housing troops of various types in the years that followed. The central block was taken over by the Royal Artillery Institution and housed a museum, archives and offices. The chapel (commissioned in 1902 by Commandant Richard Henry Jelf, commemorated by a brass plaque in the chapel) became the Garrison Church (replacing the bombed out Garrison Church of St George). In this way the old Academy continued in military use through the 20th century, but with the number of personnel based in Woolwich having steadily decreased, the site was in 2002 declared surplus to requirements. It closed the following year; two stained glass windows from the chapel – one by Christopher Whall, an Arts & Crafts artist – were moved to the Garrison Church of St Alban the Martyr at Larkhill, where they are displayed in lightboxes.

==== Sale and redevelopment ====
Durkan Group bought the Woolwich site by public tender in 2006 and redevelopment started in 2008. The Woolwich buildings, several of which are grade II listed, were converted and extended into 334 houses and apartments, including 150 for a housing association. In 2017 the scaffolding around the main facade was removed as refurbishment neared completion. Since 2013 the RMA cricket field, one of the oldest in the UK, has been used by the 3rd and 4th teams of Blackheath Cricket Club.

== Legacy ==
=== Education and training ===
Until 1870 prospective officers in the British Army had for the most part to purchase their commissions, and education or training was not seen as a requirement for the role. The Board of Ordnance's establishment of a Military Academy represented a very different approach, whereby training and education were obligatory for aspiring officers of its corps, and promotion was offered according to merit (those with the highest achievement in their exams being given the first choice of opportunities).

=== Architecture ===
The main Academy buildings are described by Historic England as "an outstanding example of Wyatt's Gothick style, and one of the most important pieces of military architecture in the country".

=== Slang ===
A phrase said to have entered common parlance from the Academy is "talking shop" (meaning "to discuss subjects not understood by others").

The name of the cue game "snooker" (reputedly invented by a former cadet of the Academy) is said to derive from a slang term for newly arrived cadets: the French term "les neux", which was later corrupted into "snooks".

== Governors and Commandants ==
Commandants have included:

- 1764–1777: Lieutenant Colonel James B. Pattison (Lieutenant-Governor)
- 1777–1781: Lieutenant Colonel James Bramham (Lieutenant-Governor)
- 1781–1795: Major B. Stehelin (Lieutenant-Governor)
- 1795–1809: Lieutenant Colonel William Twiss (Lieutenant-Governor)
- 1809–1820: Lieutenant Colonel William Mudge (Lieutenant-Governor)
- 1820–1829: Captain W. H. Ford (Lieutenant-Governor)
- 1829–1840: Colonel T. Drummond (Lieutenant-Governor)
- 1840–1846: Major-General Sir George Whitmore (Lieutenant-Governor)
- 1846–1851: Colonel John Boteler Parker (Lieutenant-Governor)
- 1851–1860: Colonel G. G. Lewis (Lieutenant-Governor)
- 1860–1862: Colonel E. X. Wilford (Lieutenant-Governor)
- 1862–1867: Major-General Henry Sandham (Lieutenant-Governor)
- 1867–1869: Major-General J. W. Ormsby (Lieutenant-Governor)
- 1869–1875: Major-General Sir J. Lintorn Simmons (Lieutenant-Governor; Governor and Commandant)
- 1875–1880: Major-General Sir John Miller Adye (Governor and Commandant)
- 1880–1887: Major-General James Frankfort Manners Browne (Governor and Commandant)
- 1887–1889: Major-General Robert J. Hay (Governor and Commandant)
- 1889–1890: Major-General Sir Richard Harrison (Governor and Commandant)
- 1890–1895: Major-General William Stirling (Governor and Commandant)
- 1895–1897: Major-General Edward Osborne Hewett (Governor and Commandant)
- 1897–1901: Major-General Francis Thomas Lloyd (Governor and Commandant)
- 1901–1904: Major-General Richard Henry Jelf (Governor and Commandant)
- 1904–1908: Colonel Henry Vivian Cowan
- 1908–1912: Colonel Andrew Graham Thomson
- 1912–1914: Brigadier-General Arthur E. A. Holland
- 1914–1918: Major-General William F. Cleeve
- 1918–1920: Major-General Geoffrey H. A. White
- 1920–1924: Major-General Sir Webb Gillman
- 1924–1926: Major-General J. Ronald E. Charles
- 1926–1930: Major-General Hugo D. de Pree
- 1930–1934: Major-General Cyril M. Wagstaff
- 1934–1938: Major-General Arthur A. Goschen
- 1938–1939: Major-General Philip Neame

== Notable teachers ==
Notable teachers at Woolwich include (in alphabetical order by surname):

- Sir Frederick Abel, appointed lecturer in chemistry in 1852
- Peter Barlow, appointed assistant mathematics master in 1801 and who retained this post until 1847
- Francis Bashforth, professor of applied mathematics
- John Bonnycastle, professor of mathematics, 1807–1821
- Charles Booth Brackenbury, assistant instructor in artillery (1860), assistant director of artillery studies (1864), director of artillery studies (1887)
- Samuel Hunter Christie was mathematical assistant in 1806 and professor of mathematics, 1838–1854
- Adair Crawford, professor of chemistry in the late 18th century
- Morgan Crofton, an Irish mathematician, was professor of mathematics from 1870 to 1884
- William Cruickshank, assistant to Adair Crawford (qv) and later professor of chemistry c.1795–1804.
- The Reverend Lewis Evans, mathematics master 1799–1820.
- Thomas Simpson Evans, mathematics assistant 1802–1810
- Michael Faraday, professor in chemistry 1829–52
- Thales Fielding, drawing master, 1828–1837.
- Sir George Greenhill was professor of mathematics from 1876 to 1908
- Olinthus Gregory, mathematics master from 1802, professor of mathematics 1821–1838.
- Charles Hutton, professor of mathematics from 1773 to 1807.
- James Marsh, chemist, assistant to Michael Faraday (qv) 1829–1846
- Major-General Richard Clement Moody, professor of fortifications from July 1838 to October 1841
- William Rutherford, assistant master of mathematics, 1838–1865
- Paul Sandby was chief drawing master from 1768 to 1799
- Henry Young Darracott Scott, assistant instructor in field works, 1848 to 1851, senior instructor, 1851 to 1855
- Thomas Simpson, assistant to the chief master of mathematics from 1743 to 1761.
- James Joseph Sylvester, professor of mathematics from 1855 to 1870.

== See also ==
- Category:Graduates of the Royal Military Academy, Woolwich

== Sources ==
- Guggisberg, Captain F. G. (1902). "The Shop": The Story of the Royal Military Academy. London: Cassell. (Second, revised edition; online edition at Harvard here)
- Timbers, Ken (2008). The Royal Artillery, Woolwich: A Celebration. Third Millennium. ISBN 978-1-90394273-4.
- Vibart, H.M. (1894). Addiscombe: Its Heroes and Men of Note. Westminster: Archibald Constable.
