= Weohstan, ealdorman of Wiltshire =

Leader of Wessex who ruled Wiltshire as ealdorman under kings Cynewulf and Beorhtric

Weohstan (died 802) was the ealdorman of Wiltshire, part of the kingdom of Wessex, at the beginning of the ninth century. In 802 King Beorhtric died, and on the same day ealdorman Æthelmund of the Hwicce invaded Wiltshire. He was met by a Wiltshire army under Weohstan, which defeated the invasion and both ealdormen were killed in the battle.

According to a poem in the fifteenth century Chronicon Vilodunense, Weohstan founded Wilton Abbey, and his wife Alburga, the half-sister of Beorhtric's successor, King Ecgberht, later became the abbess. This story is accepted by some historians, but rejected by Sarah Foot and Elizabeth Crittall.
