= Dixie Grammar School =

Dixie Grammar school
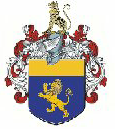

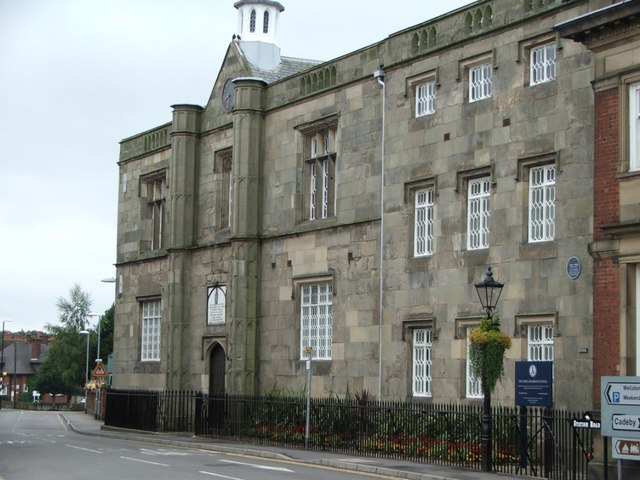

Location
- Station Road; Market Bosworth, Leicestershire, CV13 0LE; England
- Coordinates: 52.62473°N 1.40302°W

Information
- Type: Private school
- Established: 1601 (refounded)
- Department for Education URN: 120339 Tables
- Gender: Coeducational
- Age: 3 to 18
- Enrolment: 500
- Houses: York and Lancaster
- Colours: Yellow and blue
- Publication: Snow Leopard
- Website: www.dixie.org.uk

Dixie Grammar School is a private school in Market Bosworth, Leicestershire.

The earliest records of the School's existence date from 1320, but the school was re-founded in 1601 under the will of an Elizabethan merchant and Lord Mayor of London, Sir Wolstan Dixie, by his great-nephew Sir Wolstan Dixie of Appleby Magna, who came to live in Market Bosworth in 1608.

The most distinguished of the School's former pupils is Thomas Hooker, founder of Hartford, Connecticut, known as the Father of American Democracy. Samuel Johnson, moralist, poet and author of the famous dictionary, taught at the school in the mid-eighteenth century.

The main building of today's school was built in 1828 and faces the market square of Market Bosworth. A distinguished headmaster of the school was the Rev. Arthur Benoni Evans from 1829 till his death in 1854. The school ceased to exist as a "grammar school" in 1969, with the establishment of Market Bosworth High School (11–13 years) and Bosworth Community College, Desford (14–18 years), as much larger comprehensive schools found favour.

The Leicestershire Independent Educational Trust was formed in 1983, and four years later the school was re-opened as a selective, independent, day school for boys and girls of all backgrounds between the ages of 10 and 18. Three years later the Junior School opened, moving in 2001 to its present premises, Temple Hall in Wellsborough.

The Dixie Grammar provides education for the following ages of children:

- The Pippins Nursery School (ages 3–4)– in Wellsborough
- The Dixie Grammar Junior School (ages 5–10) – in Wellsborough
- The Dixie Grammar School (ages 10–18) – in Market Bosworth

The school has maintained the Independent Schools' Inspectorate top rating of 'Excellent' for Educational Quality unbroken since 2015. The Headmaster, Mr Richard Lynn, has been in post since 2014.
