= Sir Douglas Dixie, 12th Baronet =

Scottish noble (1876-1948)

Sir Douglas Dixie, 12th Bt.
- Born: 18 January 1876
- Died: 25 December 1948 (aged 72)
- Spouse: Margaret Lindsay
- Children: Sir Wolstan Dixie
- Parents: Sir Alexander Dixie, 11th Baronet (father); Lady Florence Dixie (mother)
- Relatives: Archibald Douglas (grandfather); Caroline Clayton (grandmother)
- Military career
- Allegiance: United Kingdom
- Branch: Royal Navy; British Army
- Rank: Captain
- Unit: King's Own Scottish Borderers
- Conflicts: World War I

Sir George Douglas Dixie, 12th Baronet (18 January 1876 – 25 December 1948), known as Sir Douglas Dixie, was the second to last of the Dixie baronets. He served in the Royal Navy and the King's Own Scottish Borderers.

== Early life ==
Dixie was the elder son of Sir Alexander Beaumont Churchill Dixie, 11th Baronet, and his wife, Lady Florence Dixie. His mother was well known as a traveller, writer and feminist, and Dixie's middle name came from her family. His uncle was the famous John Douglas, 9th Marquess of Queensberry who gave his name to the Marquess of Queensberry rules of boxing and who brought down Oscar Wilde.

== Military career ==
After serving in the Royal Navy as a midshipman, the young Dixie was commissioned into the King's Own Scottish Borderers (KOSB) in 1895. He was promoted to lieutenant in the 3rd (Militia) battalion on 18 May 1898, and resigned his commission on 3 March 1900. Following the outbreak of the First World War, he was promoted a temporary captain in the 5th Battalion the KOSB on 26 November 1914.

== Family ==
Dixie married Margaret Lindsay, daughter of Sir Alexander Jardine, 8th Baronet (1829–1893).

He died in 1948 and was succeeded by his son, Sir Wolstan Dixie (8 January 1910 – 28 December 1975), who became the thirteenth and last baronet. He married twice and had two daughters, and on his death in 1975, the title became extinct.

== Arms and motto ==
- Arms: Azure, a lion rampant or, a chief of the last.
- Crest: An ounce sejant proper ducally crowned or
- Motto: Quod dixi dixi (What I have said, I have said)

Baronetage of England
Preceded by Alexander Dixie	Baronet (of Market Bosworth); 1924–1948	Succeeded by Wolstan Dixie
