= John Douglas, 7th Marquess of Queensberry =

Scottish Whig politician

The Most Honourable The Marquess of Queensberry

Personal details
- Born: 1779
- Died: 19 December 1856 (aged 76–77)
- Party: Whig
- Spouse: Sarah Douglas (m. 1817)
- Parent(s): Sir William Douglas, 4th Baronet; Grace Johnstone
- Occupation: Politician, peer

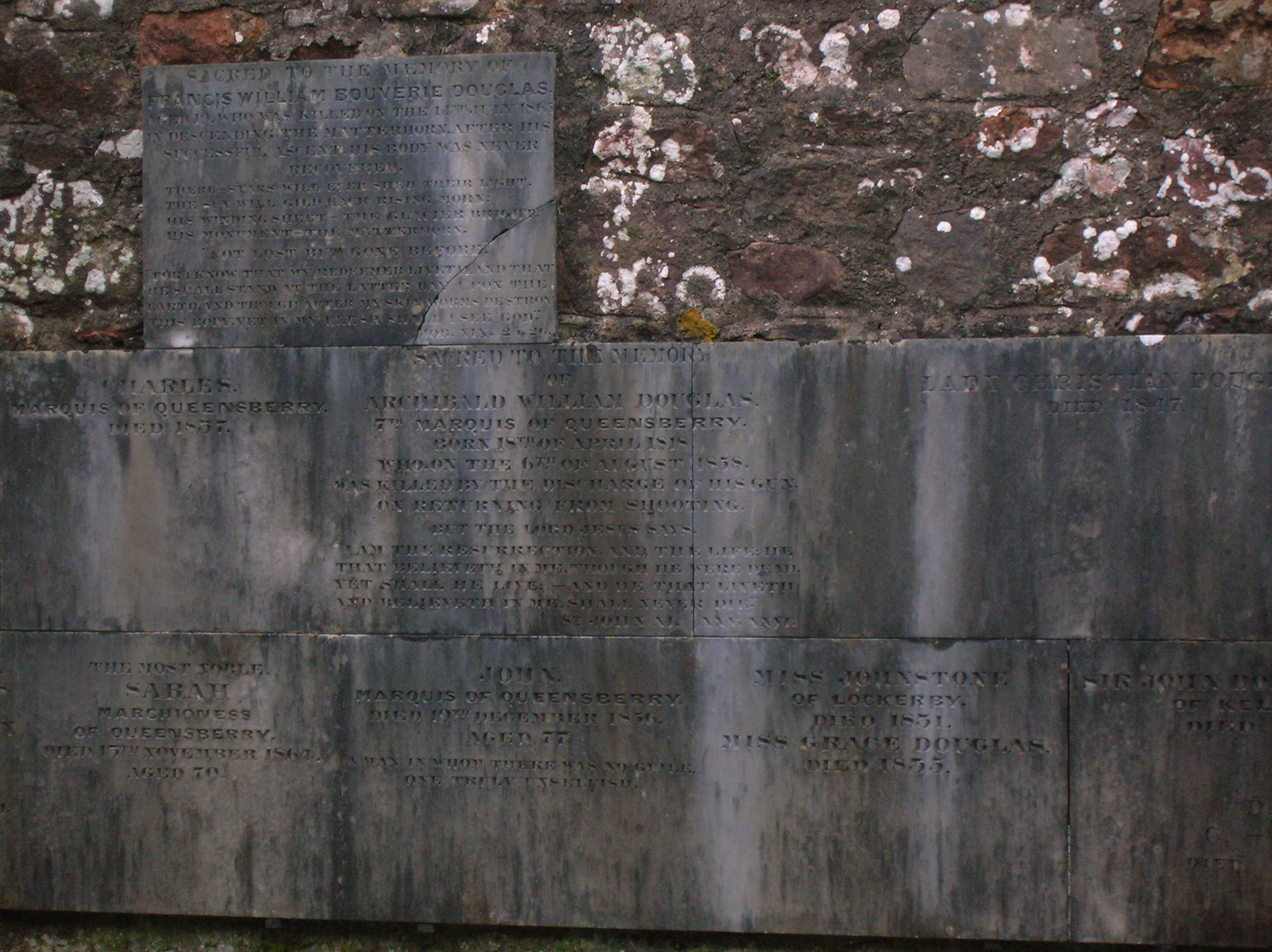
Memorial to the 7th Marquess of Queensberry (3rd row, 2nd from left) outside the Douglas Family Mausoleum, Cummertrees

John Douglas, 7th Marquess of Queensberry (1779 – 19 December 1856), styled Lord John Douglas from May to December 1837, was a Scottish Whig politician.

== Early life ==
Queensberry was the son of Sir William Douglas, 4th Baronet (died 16 May 1783), and his wife, Grace (née Johnstone) who died 25 March 1836, and succeeded his elder brother, Charles (1777–1837), in the marquessate in December 1837.

== Career ==
The same year he was appointed a Lord-in-waiting (government whip in the House of Lords) in the Whig administration of Lord Melbourne, a position he held until the government fell in 1841. Between 1837 and 1850 he also served as Lord-Lieutenant of Dumfriesshire.

== Personal life ==
On 16 July 1817, Douglas married Sarah (died 13 November 1864), daughter of James Sholto Douglas. They had two children :

- Archibald William Douglas, 8th Marquess of Queensberry (1818–1858), who married Caroline Margaret Clayton, daughter of Gen. Sir William Clayton, 5th Baronet, in 1840.
- Georgiana Douglas (born in 1819)

Lord Queensberry died on 19 December 1856 and was succeed in the marquessate by his only son, Archibald.

=== Descendants ===
Through his son Archibald, he was a grandfather of Lady Gertrude Georgiana Douglas (who married Thomas Stock), John Sholto Douglas, 9th Marquess of Queensberry, Lord Francis William Bouverie Douglas, Reverend Lord Archibald Edward Douglas, Lady Florence Caroline Douglas, and Lord James Edward Sholto Douglas (who married racehorse breeder Martha Lucy Hennessy).

Honorary titles
Preceded by The Marquess of Queensberry	Lord-Lieutenant of Dumfriesshire; 1837–1850	Succeeded by Viscount Drumlanrig
Peerage of Scotland
Preceded by Charles Douglas	Marquess of Queensberry; 1837–1856	Succeeded by Archibald William Douglas
