= Lady Florence Dixie =

Scottish writer (1855–1905)

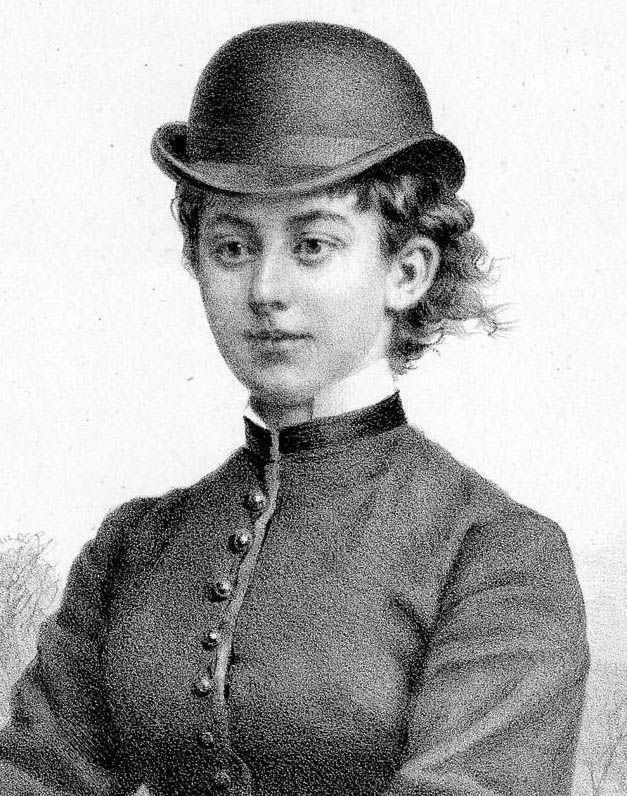
- Illustrated portrait of Dixie, c. 1877
- Born: Florence Caroline Douglas; 24 May 1855; Cummertrees, Dumfriesshire, Scotland
- Died: 7 November 1905 (aged 50); Glen Stuart, Dumfriesshire, Scotland
- Occupation: War correspondent
- Known for: Feminist
- Spouse: Alexander Dixie (m. 1875)
- Children: Sir Douglas Dixie, 12th Baronet; Albert Edward Wolstan
- Parents: Archibald Douglas (father); Caroline Clayton (mother)
- Relatives: John Douglas (brother); Francis Douglas (brother); Archibald Edward Douglas (brother); James Douglas

Lady Florence Caroline Dixie (née Douglas; 24 May 1855 – 7 November 1905) was a Scottish writer, war correspondent, and feminist. Her account of travelling Across Patagonia, her children's books The Young Castaways and Aniwee; or, The Warrior Queen, and her feminist utopia Gloriana; or, The Revolution of 1900 all deal with feminist themes related to girls, women, and their positions in society.

== Early life ==
Born in Cummertrees, Dumfries, Scotland on 24 May 1855, Lady Florence Douglas was the daughter of Caroline Margaret Clayton, daughter of General Sir William Clayton, 5th Baronet, Member of Parliament for Great Marlow, and Archibald Douglas, 8th Marquess of Queensberry.

She had a twin brother, Lord James Edward Sholto Douglas, an older sister, Lady Gertrude Douglas, and three older brothers: John, Viscount Drumlanrig, later 9th Marquess of Queensberry, Lord Francis Douglas, and the Reverend Lord Archibald Edward Douglas.

Lady Florence has been described as a tomboy who tried to match her brothers in physical activities, whether swimming, riding, or hunting. She rode astride, wore her hair short in a boyish crop, and refused to conform to fashion when being presented to Queen Victoria. She and her twin brother James were particularly close during childhood, calling each other "Darling" (Florence) and "Dearest" (James). She was also close to her older brother John, whom she resembled in temperament, both being "fearless, dynamic and opinionated".

Her childhood was marked by a number of dramatic and even tragic events. On 6 August 1858, when she was three, Lady Florence's father died; he was widely believed to have killed himself. In 1862, his widow, Caroline, acted upon a long-formed conviction and converted to Roman Catholicism. She took her youngest children, Archibald, then twelve, and Florence and James, aged seven, to France, where she could educate them as she wished. This led the children's guardians to threaten Lady Queensberry with an action under English law to take her children away from her. The three were too young to choose a guardian under Scottish law. In the event, they remained in France for two years. Falconer Atlee, the British Consul at Nantes, offered them a place of safety when their first location was discovered, and the Emperor Napoleon III eventually extended Lady Queensberry his protection, ensuring that she could keep the custody of the three children. Archibald converted to Rome and took holy orders, becoming a priest. Caroline's older daughter, Gertrude, also became a Roman Catholic. When her Anglican fiancé would not agree to their children being brought up in that faith, Gertrude's engagement was broken off. She entered a convent in Hammersmith and completed her novitiate to become a Sister of the Black Veil in 1867, but later left the order.

Eventually, it was agreed that Caroline would retain custody of her younger children, and they returned to England. Lady Florence was first educated at home by a governess, but is described as "defiant, rebellious and restless". After returning from France at the age of nine, the twins were separated. James was sent to a Roman Catholic boarding school, and Florence to a convent school, which she hated. But she found some consolation in writing poetry: her childhood verses were published much later as The songs of a child, and other poems, under the pseudonym 'Darling'.

Another tragedy struck the family just days before Florence's eldest brother, John Douglas, was to reach his majority as 9th Marquess of Queensberry. As guests gathered for a lavish celebration, word came that on 14 July 1865, the 18-year-old Lord Francis Douglas had fallen to his death with three others, after achieving the first ascent of the Matterhorn. Lord Queensberry travelled post-haste to Zermatt, with the intention of bringing his brother's body home, but nothing had been found of Lord Francis but some tattered shreds of his clothing. Queensberry, alone, without a guide, and starting out by moonlight, attacked the Matterhorn himself and made it as far as "the Hut". It was largely a matter of chance that two guides found and rescued him before he died of cold. He wrote apologetically to Florence, "I thought and thought where he was, and called him, and wondered if I should ever see him again. I was half mad with misery, and I could not help it." "Exceedingly amiable and talented" Francis's death was deeply felt by his family. In 1876, Florence accompanied Queensberry on a return to Zermatt, and he showed her the slopes where Francis had died. Beyond the family, the tragedy was a long-running sensation, reported by newspapers all over the world, often in tones both sensational and denunciatory.

== Marriage and children ==
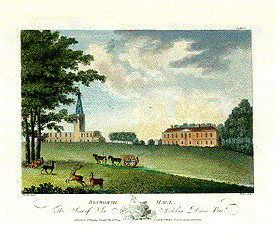
Bosworth Hall in Leicestershire.

On 3 April 1875, at the age of nineteen, Douglas married Sir Alexander Beaumont Churchill Dixie, 11th Baronet (1851–1924), known as "Sir A.B.C.D." or "Beau". Beau, who had succeeded his father as the 11th baronet on 8 January 1872, had an income of £10,000 per year, equivalent to £977,683 in 2025, a country house, Bosworth Hall, near Market Bosworth, and a London townhouse in the fashionable district of Mayfair. He served as High Sheriff of Leicestershire for 1876. Though Florence was only five feet tall, while Beau stood 6 feet 2 inches (1.88 m), Florence became the dominant partner in the marriage, reportedly ruling her husband "with a rod of iron".

The young couple had two sons, George Douglas (born 18 January 1876), who later became the 12th baronet, and Albert Edward Wolstan (born 26 September 1878, died 1940), whose godfather was the Prince of Wales.

Both husband and wife shared a love of adventure and the outdoor life, and are generally considered to have had a happy marriage, certainly the happiest of the Douglas siblings. Nonetheless, Beau's habits of drinking and of gambling for high stakes had catastrophic consequences for the family. The couple were reportedly referred to by contemporaries as "Sir Always and Lady Sometimes Tipsy". In 1885 Beau's ancestral home and estate at Bosworth were sold to pay his debts.

"For some time past I have been fighting against the terrible consequences of my husband's immense losses on the Turf and at gambling . . It was a great blow to me to find that the last remnant of a once splendid fortune must at once go to pay this debt. Ruin ... Beau ... has been so accustomed to have heaps of money at his command that he cannot understand that it is all gone .... By selling Bosworth and the property these (debts) could be met." – Lady Florence Dixie

Following loss of the estate, the couple moved to Glen Stuart, Annan, Dumfriesshire, Scotland. One of the houses on Lord Queensberry's Scottish estate of Kinmount, it had previously been the home of Lady Florence's mother, the Dowager Marchioness.

== Writing ==
In 1877, Lady Florence published her first novel, Abel Avenged: a Dramatic Tragedy. A number of Dixie's books, particularly her children's books The Young Castaways, or, The Child Hunters of Patagonia and Aniwee, or, The Warrior Queen, and her adult novels Gloriana, or the Revolution of 1900 and Isola, or the Disinherited: A Revolt for Woman and all the Disinherited develop feminist themes related to girls, women, and their positions in society. Her final novel, a semi-autobiographical work entitled The Story of Ijain, or the Evolution of a Mind appeared in 1903.

Although she published fiction for both adults and children, Dixie is best remembered for her travel books, Across Patagonia (1880) and In the Land of Misfortune (1882), both of which are still reprinted. In these books Dixie presents herself as the protagonist of the story. By doing so she defies the male tradition of quoting other travel writers who have visited and written on the area, and creates a unique feminine style of travel writing in the nineteenth century.

=== Across Patagonia ===
In December 1878, two months after the birth of their second son, Edward, Dixie and her husband left their aristocratic life and their children behind them in England and traveled to Patagonia. She was the only female in her traveling party. She set out accompanied by her brothers, Lord Queensberry and Lord James Douglas, her husband Sir Alexander Beaumont Churchill Dixie, and Julius Beerbohm. Beerbohm, a family friend, was hired as the group's guide because of his previous experience in Patagonia. Dixie debated going elsewhere, but chose Patagonia because few Europeans had ever set foot there.

Once in Patagonia, Dixie paints a picture of the landscape using techniques reminiscent of the Romantic tradition of William Wordsworth and others, using emotion and physical sensation to connect to the natural world. While she describes the land as "uninviting and feared territory", Dixie's actions demonstrate that survival in a wild land requires both strength and agency.

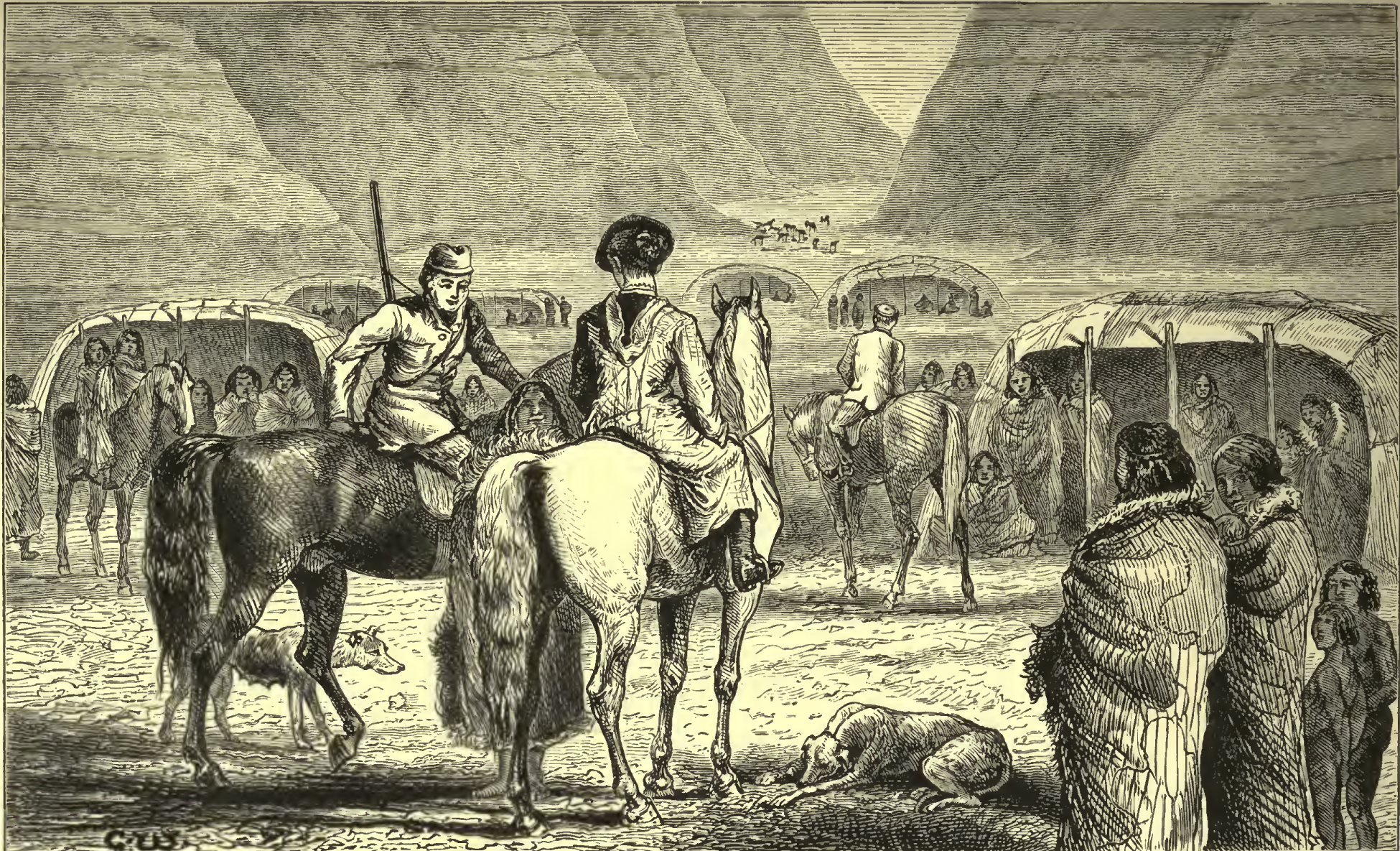
"Indian encampment", illustration from the book Across Patagonia, written by Dixie and published in 1880

During her travels in Patagonia, Dixie is "active, hardy, and resilient", rejecting Victorian gender constructs that depicted women as weak and in need of protection. Furthermore, in writing Across Patagonia (1880), Dixie never mentions her husband by name or title (simply referring to him as "my husband"), and presents herself as the expedition hero rather than the men being the heroes of the story. She recounts times where she outsmarts or outlasts the men or remains their equal.

While social issues such as European women's suffrage can be seen in her narrative, she says little about the natives of Patagonia. She has been criticized by Monica Szurmuk for not addressing the military campaigns of General Julio Argentino Roca against indigenous people of the time. However, Szurmuk also notes that Dixie's writing has a transgressive quality that acknowledges mutuality:

"A remarkable characteristic of Dixie's writing and one that sets her apart from others is that whenever she writes herself as viewer, she herself is also looked at, viewed, defined. Her first encounter with a "real Patagonian Indian" is marked by mutual gazes and by Indians and Europeans being all on horse-back, and thus at the same physical level."

Lady Dixie shared her observations of Patagonia with Charles Darwin. She took issue with Darwin's description of the Tuco-tuco in his Journal of Researches (1839). While Darwin had suggested that the Tuco-tuco were nocturnal creatures that lived almost entirely underground, Lady Dixie had seen the Tuco-tuco out during the daytime. She sent Darwin a copy of Across Patagonia; Darwin's copy of this book is part of the Library of Charles Darwin located in the Rare Books Room of Cambridge University Library.

When she returned from Patagonia, Dixie brought home with her a jaguar, which she called Affums and kept as a pet. Affums killed several deer in Windsor Great Park and had to be sent to a zoo.

A hotel at Puerto Natales in the Chilean part of Patagonia is named the Hotel Lady Florence Dixie in her honor.

Her experiences in Patagonia inspire much of her later work, both her writing for children, and her work with the women's suffrage movement. Her two children's books, The Young Castaways and its sequel Aniwee, are set in Patagonia and depict strong female characters.

"The really amazing thing in the book is the prowess, skill, and prudence of the two girls, Topsie and Aniwee, the child of an Indian chief. ... the figures of Topsie, whose expertness as a stalker might put a veteran Highlander to shame, and of Aniwee, who teaches her tribe that a woman may be just as good a hunter and warrior as a man, and so revolutionises the whole social fabric of Indian life,—these are novelties indeed."

=== In the Land of Misfortune ===
In 1881, Dixie was appointed as a field correspondent of the Morning Post of London to cover the First Boer War (1880–1881) and the aftermath of the Anglo-Zulu War. She and her husband traveled to South Africa together. In Cape Town, she stayed with the Governor of the Cape Colony. She visited Zululand, and on her return interviewed the Zulu king Cetshwayo, being held in detention by the British.

Her reports, followed by her A Defence of Zululand and Its King from the Blue Book (1882) and In the Land of Misfortune (1882), were instrumental in Cetshwayo's brief restoration to his throne in 1883. In Dixie's In the Land of Misfortune, there is a struggle between her individualism and her identification with the power of the British Empire, but for all of her sympathy with the Zulu cause and with Cetshwayo, she remained at heart an imperialist.

=== A Feminist Utopia ===
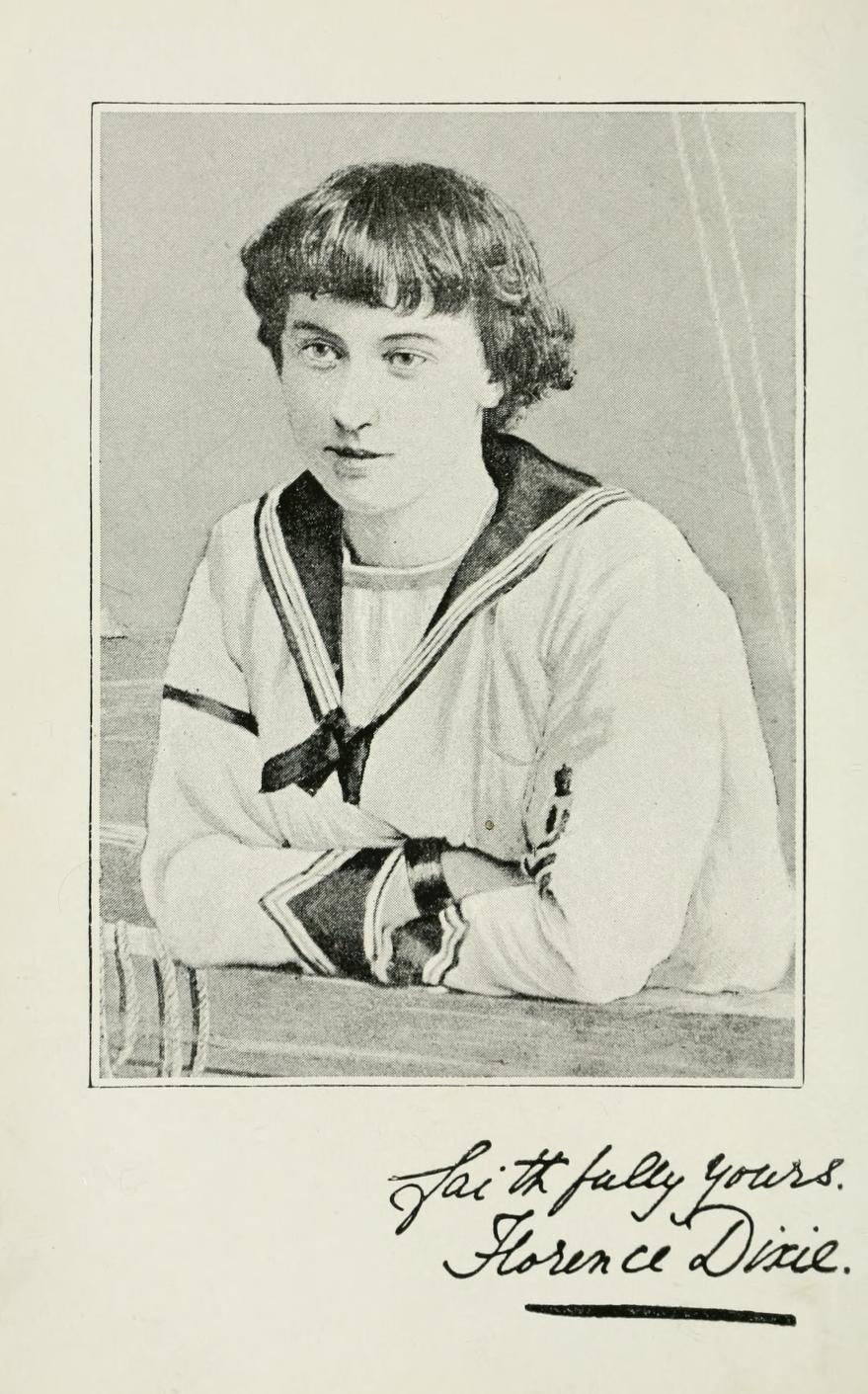
Frontispiece to "Gloriana", published by Henry & Co., 1890

Dixie held strong views on the emancipation of women, proposing that the sexes should be equal in marriage and divorce, that the Crown should be inherited by the monarch's oldest child, regardless of sex, and even that men and women should wear the same clothes. She was a member of the National Union of Women's Suffrage Societies, and her obituary in the Englishwoman's Review emphasized her support for the cause of women's suffrage (i.e. the right to vote): "Lady Florence... threw herself eagerly into the Women's Movement, and spoke on public platforms."

In 1890, Dixie published a utopian novel, Gloriana, or the Revolution of 1900, which has been described as a feminist fantasy. It also interweaves elements of romance and detective fiction. In it, women win the right to vote, as the result of the protagonist, Gloriana, posing as a man, Hector D'Estrange, and being elected to the House of Commons. The character of D'Estrange is reflective of Oscar Wilde, but perhaps even more so of Dixie herself. Another of the many active, competent and powerful women characters in the book is Scottish Lady Flora Desmond (who, as The Athenaeum pointed out, has a name very similar to the author). Flora helps to organize a 200,000 member Women's Volunteer force, and herself leads their elite mounted White Regiment. A host of women characters are instrumental to the plot, both in supporting and opposing the hero/heroine: as noted by Walker, the adventures in Gloriana occur to women rather than to men.

The book ends in the year 1999, with a description of a prosperous and peaceful Britain whose government has deeply benefited from the engagement of women. In the preface to the novel, Dixie proposes not only women's suffrage, but that the two sexes should be educated together and that all professions and positions should be open to both. In the novel, she goes farther and says:

"Nature has unmistakably given to woman a greater brain power. This is at once perceivable in childhood... Yet man deliberately sets himself to stunt that early evidence of mental capacity, by laying down the law that woman's education shall be on a lower level than that of man's... I maintain to honourable gentlemen that this procedure is arbitrary and cruel, and false to Nature. I characterise it by the strong word of Infamous. It has been the means of sending to their graves unknown, unknelled, and unnamed, thousands of women whose high intellects have been wasted, and whose powers for good have been paralysed and undeveloped."

== Women and sports ==
=== Women's football ===
Dixie played a key role is establishing the game of women's association football, organizing exhibition matches for charity, and in 1895 she became President of the British Ladies' Football Club, stipulating that "the girls should enter into the spirit of the game with heart and soul". She arranged for a women's football team from London to tour Scotland.

=== Field sports ===
During her early life and travels, Dixie was an enthusiastic sportswoman, an intrepid rider and shot. As the following reminiscence shows, part of the appeal of hunting in Leicestershire was the opportunity to compete on an equal footing with active male peers:

'The merry blast of the huntsman's horn resounds, the view-halloa rings out cheerily on the bright crisp air of a fine hunting morning; the fox is "gone away", you have got a good start, and your friend has too. "Come on," he shouts, "let us see this run together!" Side by side you fly the first fence, take your horse in hand, and settle down to ride over the broad grass country. How distinctly you remember that run, how easily you recall each fence you flew together, each timber-rail you topped, and that untempting bottom you both got so luckily and safely over, and above all, the old farm-yard, where the gallant fox yielded up his life.' Lady Florence Dixie, 1880

Dixie's skills on horseback were sufficient to be mentioned in sporting magazines. The following account gives a vivid idea of the risks involved in a fox hunt:

"From scent to view they kill him in the open in one hour and five minutes, after a good twelve miles' run. There were several very bad falls, and a great deal of grief, horses standing still in all directions. Lady Florence Dixie, who had been going admirably, had a nasty fall into the Widmerpool road, her horse quite blown. Every one was delighted to see her ladyship out again soon after. There were few who rode the run as hounds ran, and who saw the fox killed, but we believe Mr. Coupland, Captain Middleton, Lord Douglas, and Tom Firr accomplished it, much to their credit, as in the present state of the country it could not be an easy task."

In Patagonia, survival of the party as a whole depended on the equal participation of all those within it. Dixie shared the responsibility and the dangers of necessary tasks such as hunting for food for the party.

"Unconscious of anything but the exciting chase before me, I am suddenly disagreeably reminded that there is such a thing as caution, and necessity to look where you are going to, for, putting his foot in an unusually deep tuca-tuca hole, my little horse comes with a crash upon his head, and turns completely over on his back, burying me beneath him in a hopeless muddle." Lady Florence Dixie, 1880

However, she was also "haunted by a sad remorse" for the death of a beautiful golden deer of the Cordilleras, which was exceedingly tame and trusting. During the 1890s, Dixie's views on field sports changed dramatically, and in her book The Horrors of Sport (1891) she condemned blood sports as cruel. Dixie later became Vice-President of the London Vegetarian Association.

== Politics ==
Dixie was an enthusiastic writer of letters to newspapers on liberal and progressive issues, including support for Scottish and Irish Home Rule. Her article The Case of Ireland was published in Vanity Fair on 27 May 1882.

Nevertheless, she was critical of the Irish Land League and the Fenians, who reportedly made an unsuccessful attempt to attack her in March 1883. The incident received international attention, but considerable doubt was expressed, then and later, about whether such an attack had actually occurred.

=== Alleged assassination attempt ===
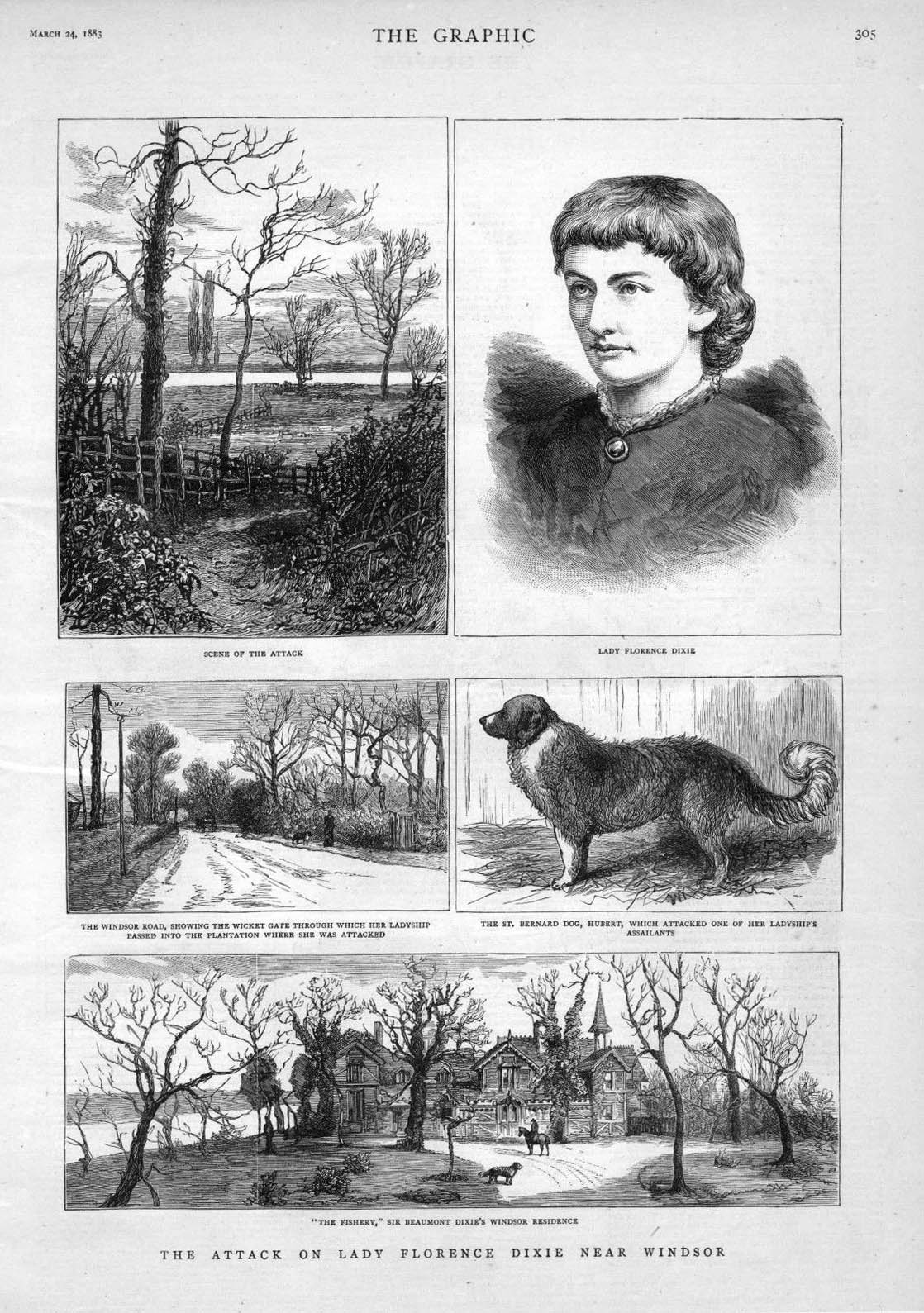
"The attack on Lady Florence Dixie near Windsor", 6-panel chronicle on The Graphic, 24 March 1883, page 305

Reports were published of an attempt to assassinate Lady Florence Dixie at her residence, the Fishery, situated near the Thames, and about two and a half miles from Windsor. Lady Florence Dixie gave the following account to the newspapers:

"I was out walking near the Fishery last evening, about 4:30, when two very tall women came up and asked me the time. I replied that I had not got my watch with me, and, turning, left them. Opening a small gate which led into the private grounds of Capt Brocklehurst, of the Blues, I made toward a stile, and was just going to get over, when I heard the gate open behind, and the two women followed me in. Somehow or other I felt all was not right, so I stopped and leaned against the rails, and then, as they came on, went to meet them. One on the right came forward and seized me by the neck, when by the strength of the clutch I felt it was no woman's power that pulled me down to the ground. In another second I saw the other would-be woman over me, and remember seeing the steel of the knife come right down upon me, driven by this person's hand. It struck through my clothes and against the whalebone of my stays, which turned the point, merely grazing the skin. The knife was quickly withdrawn and plunged at me again. I seized it with both hands and shouted as loud as I could, when the person who first pulled me down pushed a large handful of earth into my mouth and nearly choked me. Just as the knife was wrenched from my hands, a very big and powerful St. Bernard dog I had with me broke through the wood, and the last thing I remember was seeing the person with the knife pulled backward by him. Then I heard a confused sound of rumbling of wheels, and I remember no more. When I came to myself I was quite alone. From what I saw of the knife I believe it to be a dagger, and the persons were undoubtedly men. They were dressed in long clothes, and were unnaturally tall for women; the one who stabbed me had on a thick veil, reaching below the mouth; the other was unveiled, but his face I did not notice much. This is all the information I can give. My head is very confused and painful, and I expect they must have stunned me. This is a wretched scrawl, but my hands are very much cut, and it pains me so much to write."

Questions were raised in the House of Commons on 19 and 20 March, and again on the 29th, about the investigation, but Lady Dixie's account was not supported by others, and was dismissed.

"MR. O'SHEA: I wish to ask the Home Secretary a Question of which I have given him private Notice. It was, Whether sufficient investigation has now taken place as to the alleged murderous attack upon Lady Florence Dixie; and, whether, as a result of the inquiries at Windsor, and of the professional examination of the cuts on Lady Florence Dixie's clothing, the police have come to any definite conclusion in the matter?

SIR WILLIAM HARCOURT: The accounts in this case rest mainly on the statements of Lady Florence Dixie. The investigations of the police into this matter have not resulted in discovering any further circumstances in confirmation of it."

=== Alleged kidnapping ===
In her obituary, printed 8 November 1905, The New York Times suggested that Dixie had claimed to be kidnapped by Irish agitators.

== Death ==
Lady Florence Dixie died of diphtheria on 7 November 1905. She was buried beside her twin brother in the family burial ground on Gooley Hill on the Kinmount estate.

The New York Times reported that the "Author, Champion of Woman's Rights, and War Correspondent" had died on 7 November at her home in Glen Stuart, Dumfriesshire.

== Likenesses ==
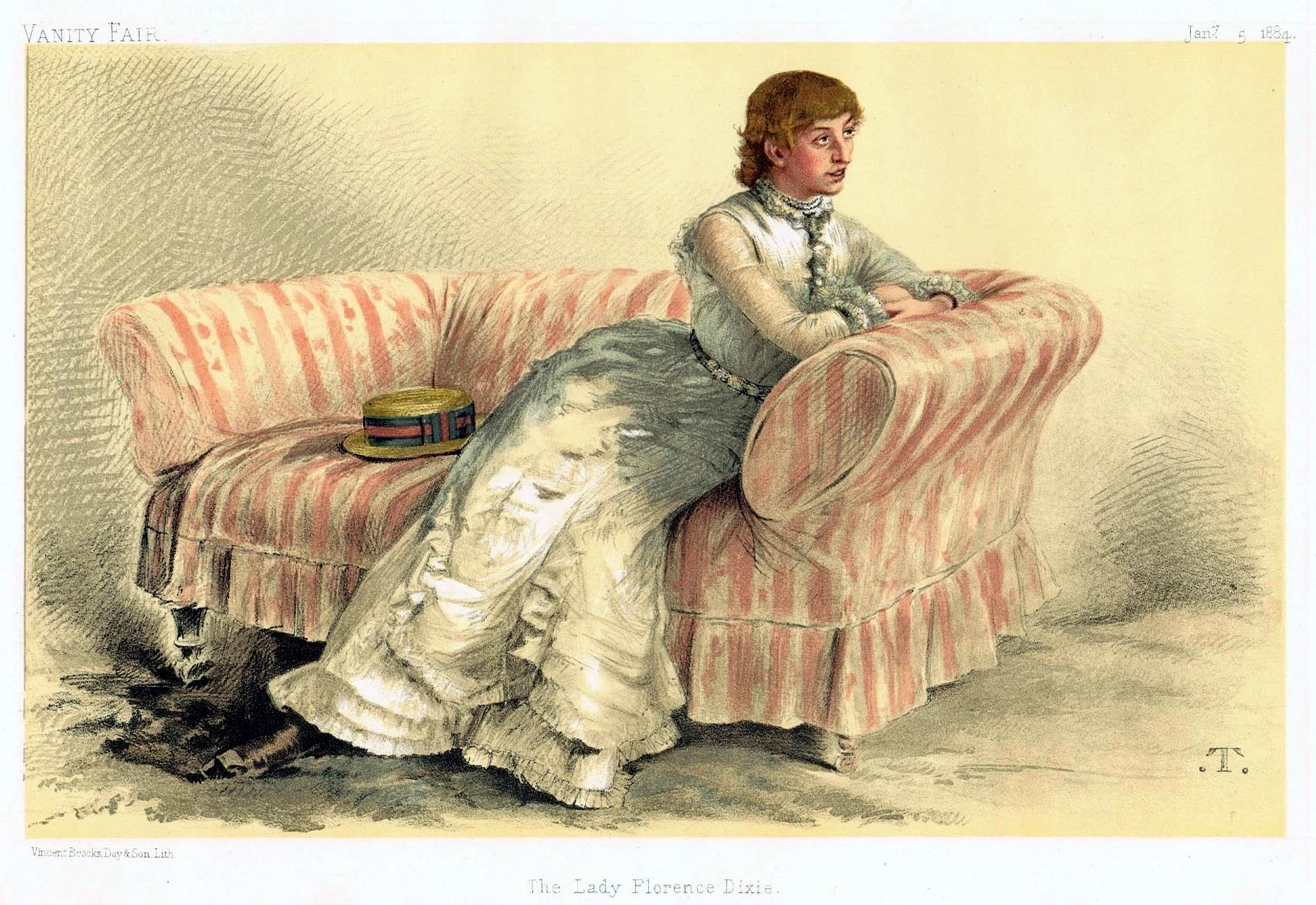
Illustration of Dixie by Théobald Chartran, published in Vanity Fair, 5 January 1884

A monochrome lithograph of Dixie by Andrew Maclure was published in 1877. She is seated on horseback and holding a riding crop. A copy is in the National Portrait Gallery.

A more significant lithograph, by Théobald Chartran, printed in colour, appeared in Vanity Fair in 1884 and is one of the long series of caricatures published in the magazine between 1868 and 1914. These were all coloured illustrations featuring notable people of the day, and each was accompanied by a short (usually adulatory) biography. Of more than two thousand people so honoured, only eighteen were women. Featured in the magazine on 5 January 1884, Dixie joined this small band, which included Queen Isabella II of Spain (1869), Sarah Bernhardt (1879), the Princess of Wales (1882) and Angela Burdett-Coutts, 1st Baroness Burdett-Coutts (1883). Victoria, Princess Royal, and Elizabeth, Empress of Austria, followed later in 1884.

== Bibliography ==
The published works of Lady Florence Dixie include:

=== Books ===
- Abel Avenged: a Dramatic Tragedy (London, Edward Moxon, 1877)
- Across Patagonia (Edinburgh, Bentley, 1880)
- Waifs and Strays: The Pilgrimage of a Bohemian Abroad (London: Griffith, Farren Okeden and Welsh, 1880, 60 pp)
- In the Land of Misfortune (London: Richard Bentley, 1882, 434 pp)
- A Defense of Zululand and Its King from the Blue Books (London: Chatto and Windus, 1882, 129 pp)
- Redeemed in Blood (London, Henry & Co., 1889)
- Gloriana; or, The Revolution of 1900 (London, Henry & Co., 1890)
- The Young Castaways; or, The Child Hunters of Patagonia (1890), for children
- Aniwee; or, The Warrior Queen (1890), for children
- Isola; or, The Disinherited: A Revolt for Woman and all the Disinherited (London, Leadenhall Press, 1902)
- The Story of Ijain; or, The Evolution of a Mind (London, 1903)

=== Shorter works ===
- "The Case of Ireland" in Vanity Fair, issue dated 27 May 1882
- "Cetshwayo and Zululand" in Nineteenth Century Volume 12 No. 2 (August 1882) pp. 303–312
- "In the Land of Misfortune" (1882)
- "On Cetshwayo and his Restoration" in Vanity Fair, 12 July 1884, pp 21–22
- "Memoirs of a Great Lone Land" in Westminster Review, Volume 139 (March 1893) pp. 247–256
- "The True Science of Living: The New Gospel of Health" in Westminster Review, Volume 150 (1898) pp. 463–470
- "The Horrors of Sport" (Humanitarian League publication no. 4, 1891)
- The Mercilessness of Sport (1901)
- Introduction to Joseph McCabe's Religion of Woman (1905)

=== Private letters ===
Unpublished works include:

- Florence Dixie to William Gladstone, 11 August 1882 (British Library: Gladstone Papers 391, Add. MS. 44476, f. 127)
- Florence Dixie to William Gladstone, 23 October 1883 (British Library: Gladstone Papers 391, Add. MS. 44483, f. 257)
- Florence Dixie to William Gladstone, 21 May 1890 (British Library: Gladstone Papers 425, Add. MS. 44510, f. 34)
- Florence Dixie to Mr Clodd, 3 July 1903 (University of Leeds: Brotherton Collection)
- Correspondence with Lord Kimberley (Bodleian Library, Oxford)
- Correspondence with Charles Darwin available via the Darwin Correspondence Project website.

=== About her ===
- "Woman's Mission" in Vanity Fair, 16 August 1884, pp 114–116
- "Woman's Mission" in Vanity Fair, 23 August 1884, pp 134–135

== Ancestry ==
Ancestors of Lady Florence Dixie

Sir John Douglas, 3rd Baronet
Sir William Douglas, 4th Baronet
Christian Cunningham
John Douglas, 7th Marquess of Queensberry
William Johnstone
Dame Grace Johnstone
Archibald Douglas, 8th Marquess of Queensberry
Charles James Sholto Douglas (son of Sir John & C. Cunningham above)
Maj. James Sholto Douglas
Basilia Dawes (daughter of James below)
Sarah Douglas
James Dawes
Sarah Dawes
Lady Florence Caroline Dixie
William Clayton (son of 1st Baronet)
Sir William Clayton, 4th Baronet
Maria Eliza Catherine Lloyd
Sir William Clayton, 5th Baronet
William East, 1st Baronet (of Hall Place, Maidenhead)
Mary East
_ Jackson
Caroline Margaret Clayton
Neale/Neal O'Donnell/ O'Donel, 1st Baronet
Hugh O'Donnell
Mary Coane
Alice Hugh Massey O'Donnell
Massey Hutchinson of Mount Massey, Co. Cork
Alice Hutchinson

== Descendants ==
Lady Florence Dixie's eldest son, George Douglas Dixie (18 January 1876 – 25 December 1948) served in the Royal Navy as a midshipman and was commissioned into the King's Own Scottish Borderers in 1895. On 26 November 1914, he was promoted a temporary captain in the 5th Battalion the KOSB. He married Margaret Lindsay, daughter of Sir Alexander Jardine, 8th Baronet, and in 1924 succeeded to his father's title and was known as Sir Douglas Dixie, 12th Baronet.

When he died in 1948, Sir Douglas was succeeded by his son, Sir (Alexander Archibald Douglas) Wolstan Dixie, 13th and last Baronet (8 January 1910 – 28 December 1975). The 13th Bt. married Dorothy Penelope King-Kirkman in 1950, as his second wife. They had two daughters; 1) Eleanor Barbara Lindsay; and 2) Caroline Mary Jane. Both daughters have issue.
