= Bosworth Hall, Market Bosworth =

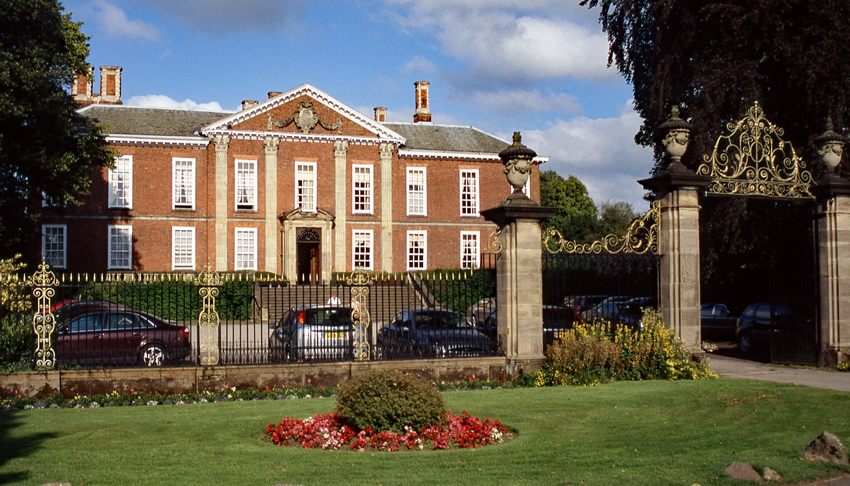
- Market Bosworth Hall

- Location within Leicestershire
- 52°37′36″N 1°23′51″W
- Type: Country house
- Location: Market Bosworth, Leicestershire
- OS grid reference: SK4083003329

History
- Built: 1680–1690

Site notes
- Owner: Britannia Hotels

Listed Building – Grade II*
- Official name: Bosworth Park Infirmary
- Designated: 28 May 1987
- Reference no.: 1251547

Bosworth Hall is a historic country house and Grade II* listed building in the rural town of Market Bosworth in Leicestershire, England, now known as the Bosworth Hall Hotel. It was the country seat of the Dixie family (baronets of Bosworth) for nearly three hundred years. Since the 1980s the house has had several owners and is now a hotel.

== History ==
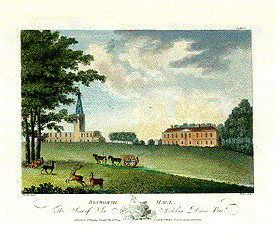
"Bosworth Hall, the Seat of Sir Wolstan Dixie, Bart", 1791

Bosworth Hall is a former stately home which belonged to the once wealthy Dixie family, whose strong connections with Market Bosworth date back to the 12th century. At the time of the Restoration of King Charles II in 1660, the head of the family was created a baronet, of Bosworth, a title which became extinct with the death of Sir Wolstan Dixie, 13th and last Baronet, in 1975.

The parkland of the present house was bought by Sir Wolstan Dixie, Lord Mayor of London, in 1589, and the main house was built during the reign of William III and Mary II by his brother's descendant Sir Beaumont Dixie, 2nd Baronet, who had inherited the estate in 1682. The Dixie family fortune was lost in the 19th century, and the house and estate were sold in the 1880s to pay gambling debts.

In the eighteenth century Sir Wolstan Dixie, the 4th baronet, had a reputation for being a pugnacious bully, with a penchant for using his fists to settle any dispute, which often set him at odds with his neighbours and even ex-employees. As the chief trustee of the local school he "had complete control" over the appointment of tutors at the establishment. In March 1732 he appointed the young and impoverished Samuel Johnson (1709–1784) to a position of usher at the school, even though he did not have the required university degree.

Another stipulation of the school statutes that Dixie ignored was that the master be provided with a house of his own. Instead, Johnson was lodged at Bosworth Hall and, in the words of Johnson's biographer James Boswell (who had it from Johnson's lifelong friend, and near neighbour of Dixie, John Taylor of Ashbourne), Johnson became "a kind of domestick chaplain, so far at least, as to say grace at table, but was treated with what he represented as intolerable harshness; and, after suffering for a few months such complicated misery, he relinquished a situation for which all his life afterwards he recollected with the strongest aversion, and even a degree of horrour".

As Dixie was also "legendary for his ignorance" there is an amusing anecdote told about his violent encounter with a neighbouring squire who objected to Dixie barring access to a footpath across his land. The ensuing fight must have been memorable, for Dixie at least: when he was presented to the Germanic King George II at a levee as Sir Wolstan Dixie "of Bosworth Park", the king, wanting perhaps to show some knowledge of important English battles, said, "'Bosworth-Bosworth! Big battle at Bosworth, wasn't it?' 'Yes, Sire. But I thrashed him', replied Sir Wolstan, oblivious of any other fight than his own".

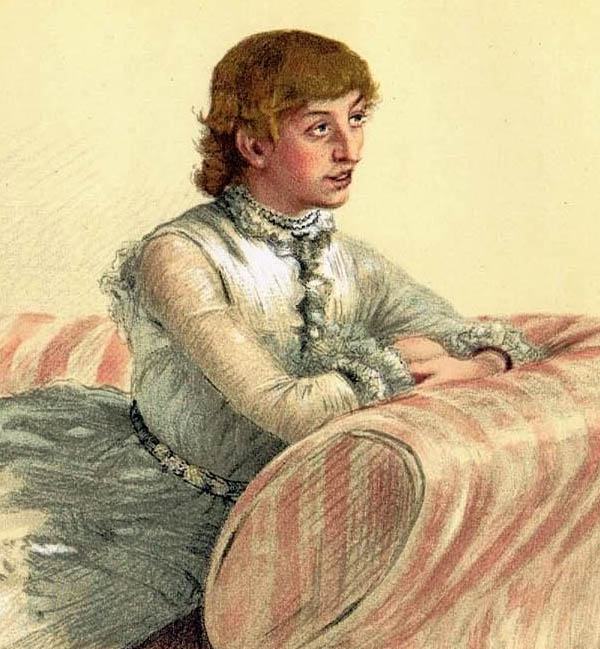
Lady Florence Dixie

The last Dixie of Bosworth Hall, Sir Alexander Beaumont Churchill Dixie, 11th Baronet (1851–1924), who was known as "Sir A.B.C.D." or "Beau", was High Sheriff of Leicestershire for 1876. In 1875, he married Florence Douglas (1855–1905), who in her lifetime was well known as a writer, feminist, big game hunter, war correspondent, and suffragist. While still living at Bosworth she wrote the best-seller Across Patagonia (1880). She was a sister of the Marquess of Queensberry who gave his name to the Marquess of Queensberry rules and an aunt of Oscar Wilde's close friend Lord Alfred Douglas. Sir Alexander and Lady Florence left Bosworth in the early 1880s and went to live at Glen Stuart House on Lord Queensberry's Kinmount estate in Dumfriesshire, Scotland. However, the Dixies maintained connections with Bosworth, serving as governors of its grammar school, and the 13th and last Baronet had a home in Bosworth Park at the time of his death in 1975.

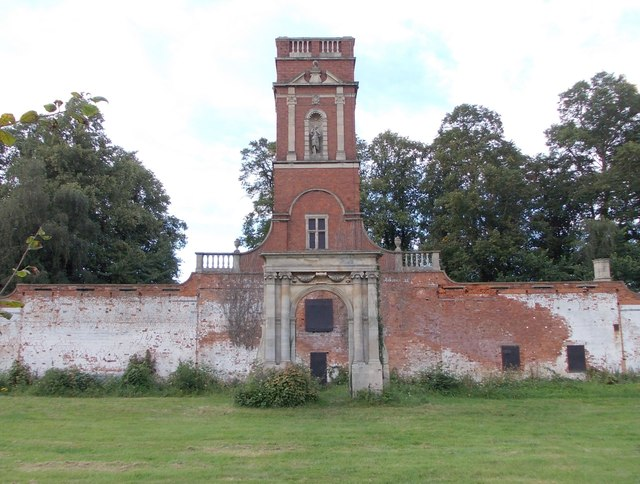
Water tower

The Bosworth estate was purchased in 1885 by Charles Tollemache Scott, who made numerous improvements to the building and added his initials to some of the iron guttering, which can still be seen. Scott married Lady Agnes Tollemache, heiress to the Earls of Dysart. Following the estate’s purchase, Scott improved the house, park, and surrounding village. Architect Thomas Garner designed additions to the Hall in the Queen Anne style, and estate buildings. The walled garden, greenhouses and tower are Grade II listed. Among other changes Tollemache Scott made, the cellar gates were replaced with cell doors from the Newgate Prison in London. The gate is still there, situated at the entrance to the Newgate bar.

Tollemache Scott's daughter, Wenefryde Scott, later Countess of Dysart, sold the Bosworth Hall estate in 1913. It changed hands twice more before being sold to Leicestershire County Council in 1931. It became a hospital, Bosworth Park Infirmary, which it remained until 1988. Folk musician Davey Graham was born in the infirmary in 1940 and a blue plaque marks his birthplace.

== Conversion into a hotel ==
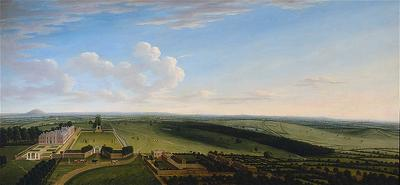
Bosworth Hall and Park, c. 1725

After the hospital at Bosworth Hall was closed, the property was bought by a construction firm for conversion into a hotel. Although the firm went bankrupt, the conversion was completed by the Britannia Hotels chain, which bought the property.

The hotel has 210 bedrooms, a health and leisure club, restaurants and a bar. It also has conference and banqueting facilities.
