= Gloriana (disambiguation) =

Gloriana is a 1953 opera by Benjamin Britten.

Gloriana may also refer to:

- Gloriana (moth), a genus of moths of the family Erebidae
- Gloriana (barge), a royal barge built for Queen Elizabeth II's Diamond Jubilee
- Gloriana (band)
- Gloriana (name)

== Literature ==
- Gloriana, the protagonist in Edmund Spenser's epic poem The Faerie Queene

- One of Elizabeth I of England's sobriquets (after Spenser's allegorical poem)

- Gloriana (play), a 1676 play by Nathaniel Lee set in Ancient Rome
- Gloriana, or the Revolution of 1900, an 1890 utopian novel by Florence Dixie
- Gloriana (novel), a 1978 novel by Michael Moorcock
- Gloriana, the super-hero code-name of comic book character Meggan
- Gloriana, a fictional world in Quest for Glory game
- Gloriana-class battleship found in the Warhammer 40,000 universe

== Other uses ==
- Gloriana (band), a country music band
  - Gloriana (album), their debut album
- Gloriana Peak, a mountain in New Zealand
- "Gloriana" (The Crown), a 2016 television episode
