= Lord Francis Douglas =

British mountaineer

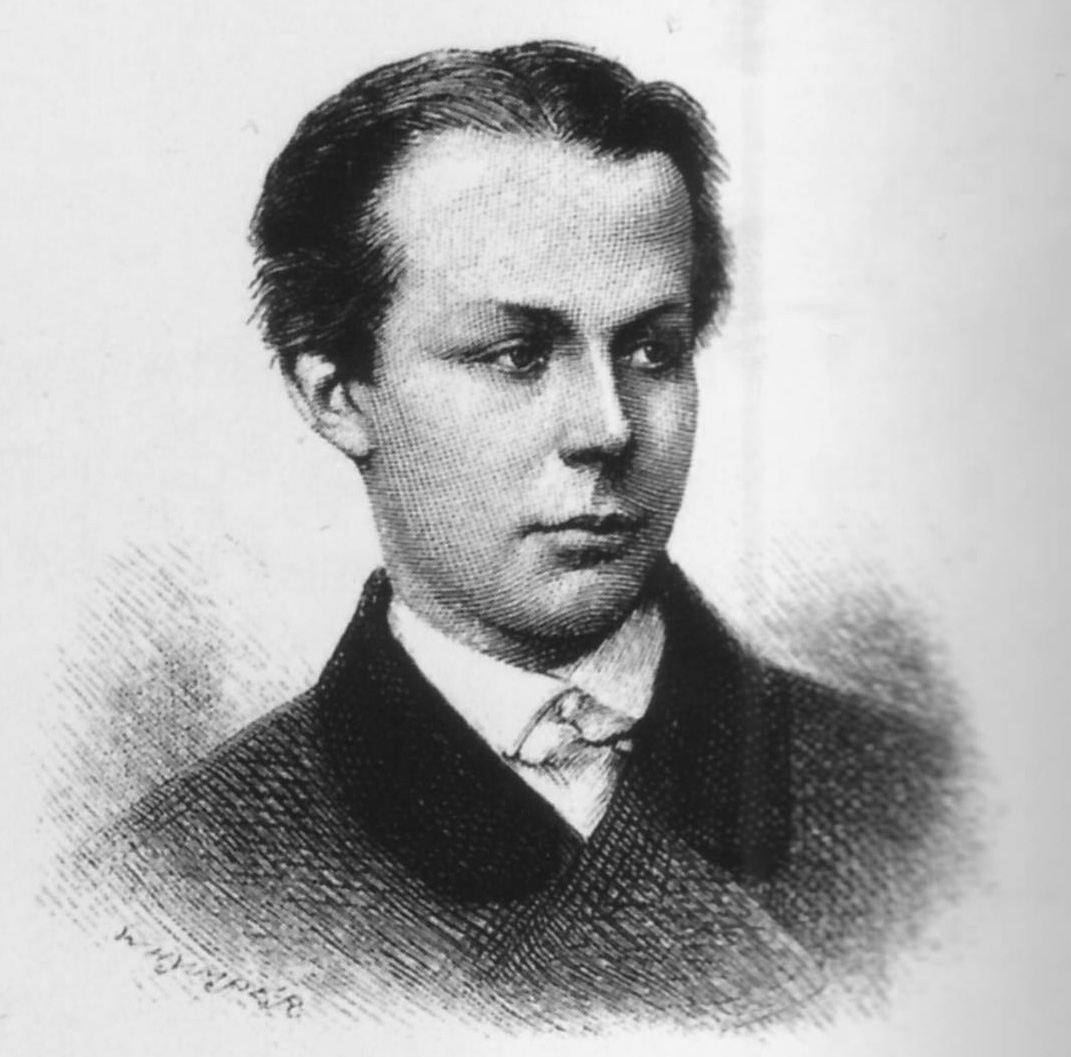
Lord Francis Douglas

Lord Francis William Bouverie Douglas (8 February 1847 – 14 July 1865) was a novice British mountaineer. After sharing in the first ascent of the Matterhorn, he died in a fall on the way down from the summit. His body has never been recovered.

== Early life ==
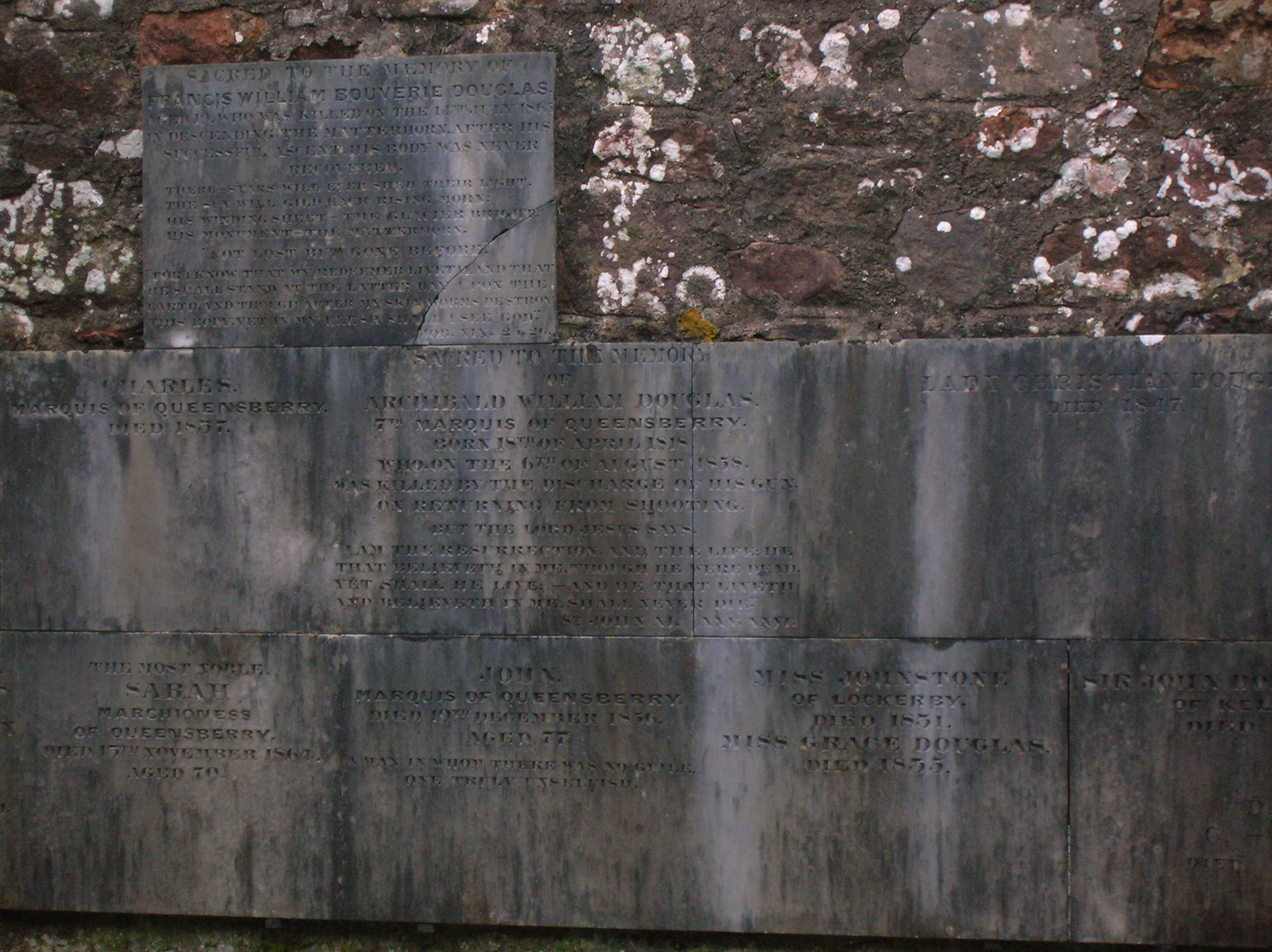
Memorial to Lord Francis Douglas (top row) outside the Douglas Family Mausoleum, Cummertrees.

Douglas was born in Scotland at Cummertrees, Dumfries, the son of Archibald William Douglas, 8th Marquess of Queensberry and his wife Caroline, daughter of General Sir William Robert Clayton, Bt. (1786–1866), member of parliament for Great Marlow. He had an older sister, Lady Gertrude Georgiana Douglas (1842–1893); an older brother, John Sholto Douglas, Viscount Drumlanrig (1844–1900), later the ninth Marquess of Queensberry; a younger brother, Lord Archibald Edward Douglas (1850–1938), who became a clergyman; and a younger brother and sister, the twins Lord James Douglas (d. 1891) and Lady Florence Douglas (1855–1905), who married Sir Alexander Beaumont Churchill Dixie, 11th Baronet.

In 1858, Douglas's father, Lord Queensberry, died in what was reported as a shooting accident, but his death was widely believed to have been suicide. In 1862, his mother, Lady Queensberry, converted to Roman Catholicism and took her children to live in Paris.

Douglas was educated at the Edinburgh Academy.

== Triumph and death on the Matterhorn ==
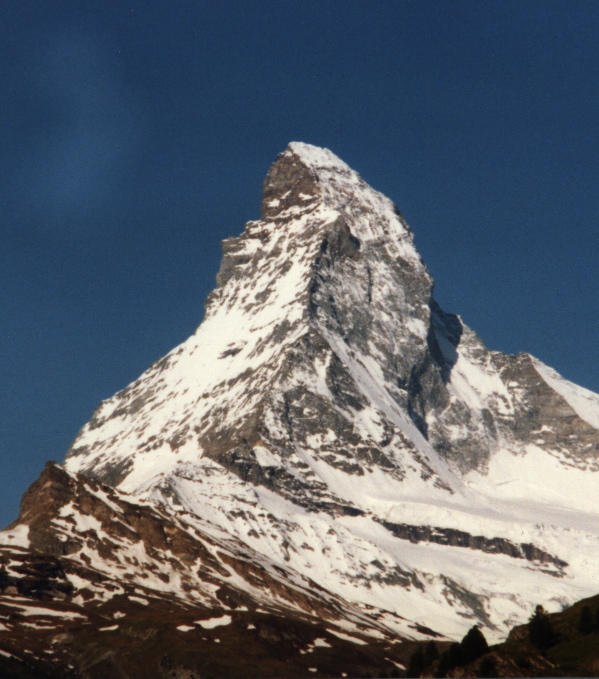
The Matterhorn in the Swiss Alps; its height is 4,478 metres (14,692 ft)

At the beginning of 1865, the Matterhorn was still unconquered, and more than one assault on it was planned. One such group consisted of Douglas, Edward Whymper, and their guide Peter Taugwalder. Whymper had already made several unsuccessful attempts on the mountain. On 5 July, this group made the second ascent (and the first by the north-north-west ridge) of the Ober Gabelhorn, a peak of 4,053 metres on the north-west side of the Matterhorn; also in July, Douglas made the first ascent of the nearby Unter Gabelhorn (3,391 m) with guides Peter Taugwalder and P. Inäbnit.

Hearing of a planned assault on the main peak by an Italian party, Douglas and Whymper joined forces with two other British climbers, Charles Hudson and Douglas Robert Hadow, and their guide Michel Croz.

At 4:30 a.m. on 13 July, a combined party of seven men, led by Whymper, set off for the Matterhorn under a clear sky: Whymper, Douglas, Hudson and Hadow, plus Taugwalder and son, and Croz. They climbed past the Schwarzsee to a plateau where they camped. Meanwhile, the Italians, led by Carrel, had camped at a height of about 4000 meters on the Lion Ridge.

On 14 July, Whymper's party proceeded to a successful first ascent by the Hörnli route. However, on the way down, Hadow fell, knocking down Croz, and also dragging Hudson and Douglas, connected by a rope. The four fell to their deaths on the Matterhorn Glacier 1,400 metres below. Three of the bodies lost were later found, but not Douglas'.

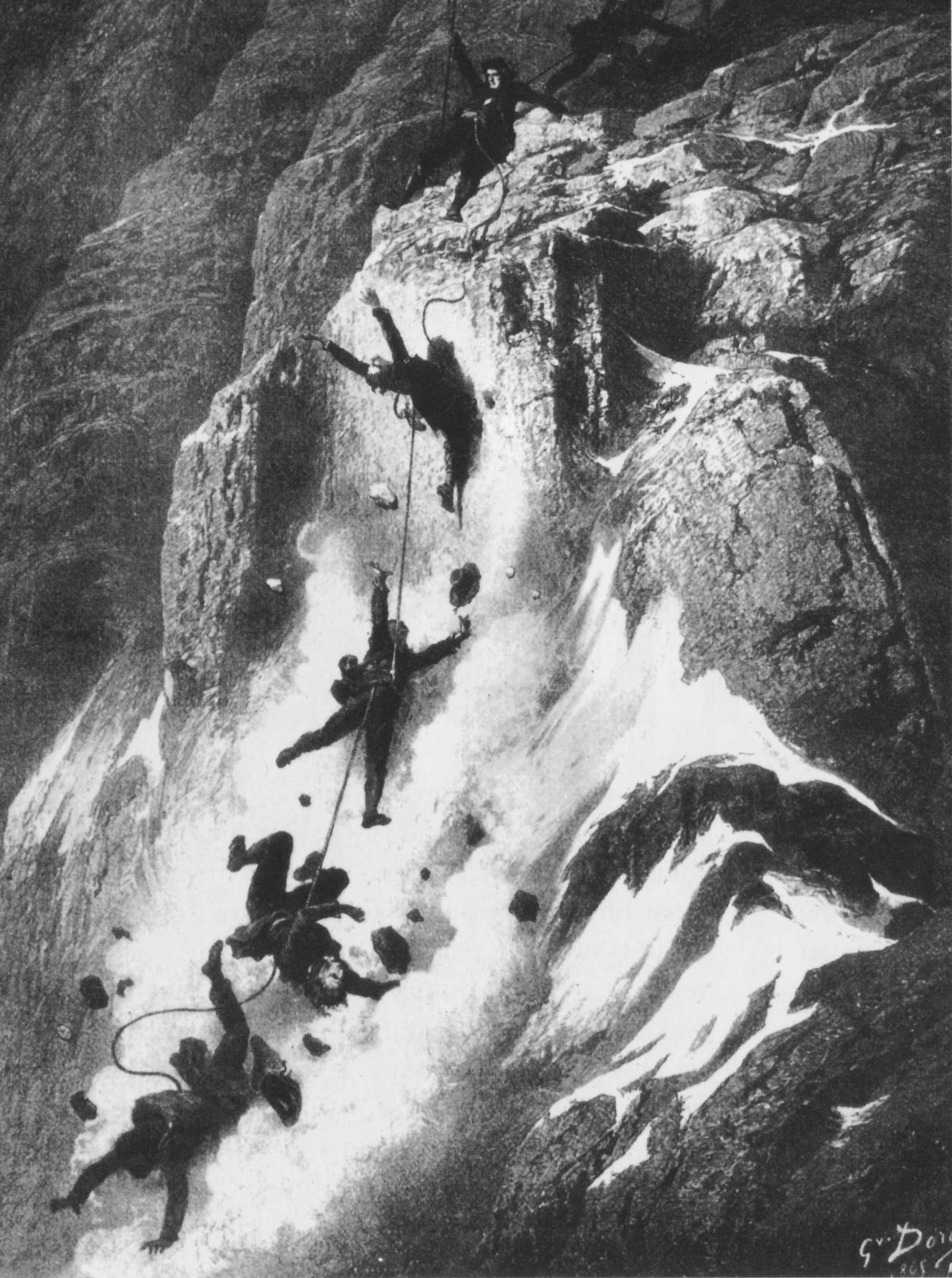
The Matterhorn Disaster, depicted by Gustave Doré

Whymper later described the deaths as follows:

Michael Croz had laid aside his axe, and in order to give Mr. Hadow greater security was absolutely taking hold of his legs and putting his feet, one by one, into their proper positions. As far as I know, no one was actually descending. I can not speak with certainty, because the two leading men were partially hidden from my sight by an intervening mass of rock, but it is my belief, from the movements of their shoulders, that Croz, having done as I have said, was in the act of turning round to go down a step or two himself; at the moment Mr. Hadow slipt, fell against him and knocked him over. I heard one startled exclamation from Croz, then saw him and Mr. Hadow flying downward; in another moment Hudson was dragged from his steps, and Lord Francis Douglas immediately after him. All this was the work of a moment. Immediately we heard Croz's exclamation, old Peter and I planted ourselves as firmly as the rocks would permit; the rope was taut between us, and the jerk came on us both as one man. We held, but the rope broke midway between Taugwalder and Lord Francis Douglas. For a few seconds we saw our unfortunate companions sliding downward on their backs, and spreading out their hands, endeavoring to save themselves. They passed from our sight uninjured, disappeared one by one, and fell from precipice to precipice on to the Matterhorngletscher below, a distance of nearly four thousand feet in height. From the moment the rope broke it was impossible to help them. So perished our comrades! For the space of half an hour we remained on the spot without moving a single step.

The rival party of Italian alpinists reached the Matterhorn's summit three days later.

== Aftermath ==
The deaths of Douglas, Croz, Hadow and Hudson led to years of recriminations and debate, many blaming Whymper, others suggesting sabotage and even murder. The coroner in Zermatt (a hotelier) asked few searching questions, and the climbing fraternity was deeply divided over the matter until long after the deaths of all concerned. The incident is seen as marking the end of the Golden age of alpinism.

The Rev. Arthur G. Butler was inspired to defend the climbing of the Matterhorn in verse:

We were not what we are
Without that other fiery element—
The love, the thirst for venture, and the scorn
That aught should be too great for mortal powers.

40 years after the accident, Lord Francis Douglas's sister still hoped that the remains of her brother could be found. Exactly 150 years after the accident an (unsuccessful) attempt was made to find Douglas's remains.

== Ancestry ==
Ancestors of Lord Francis Douglas

Sir John Douglas, 3rd Baronet
Sir William Douglas, 4th Baronet
Christian Cunningham
John Douglas, 7th Marquess of Queensberry
William Johnstone
Dame Grace Johnstone
Archibald Douglas, 8th Marquess of Queensberry
Charles James Sholto Douglas (son of Sir John & C. Cunningham above)
Maj. James Sholto Douglas
Basilia Dawes (daughter of James below)
Sarah Douglas
James Dawes
Sarah Dawes
Lord Francis William; Bouverie Douglas
William Clayton (son of 1st Baronet)
Sir William Clayton, 4th Baronet
Maria Eliza Catherine Lloyd
Sir William Clayton, 5th Baronet
William East, 1st Baronet (of Hall Place, Maidenhead)
Mary East
_ Jackson
Caroline Margaret Clayton
Neale/Neal O'Donnell/ O'Donel, 1st Baronet
Hugh O'Donnell
Mary Coane
Alice Hugh Massey O'Donnell
Massey Hutchinson of Mount Massey, Co. Cork
Alice Hutchinson

== Related images ==
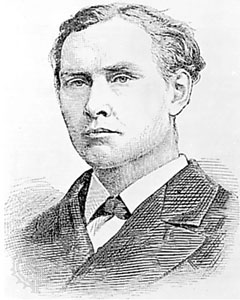
Edward Whymper

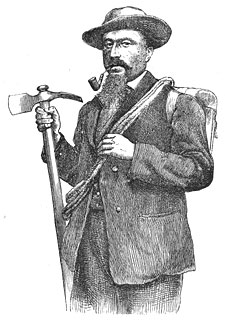
Michel Croz

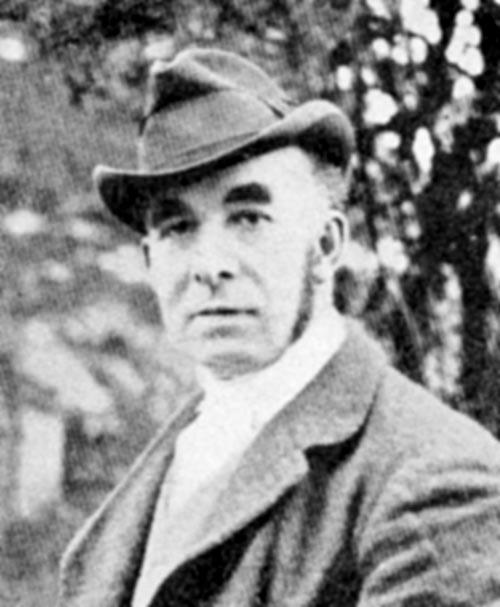
9th Marquess of Queensberry

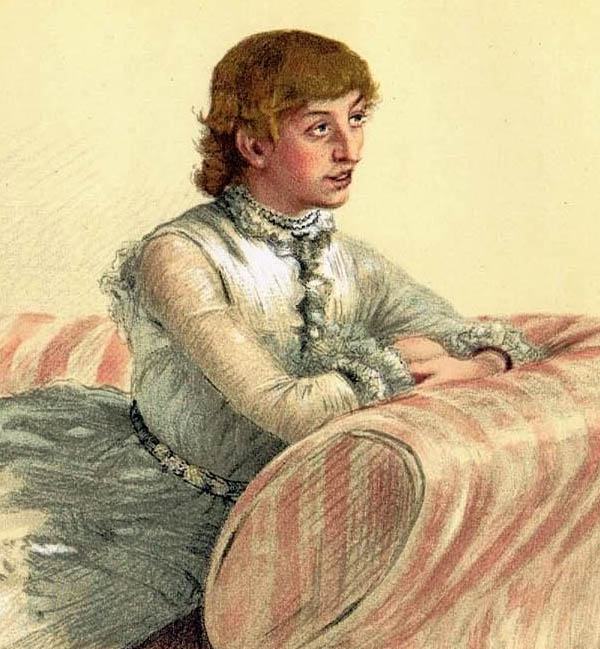
Lady Florence Douglas

== Bibliography ==
- Gos, Charles (1948). "The Matterhorn Catastrophe". Alpine Tragedy. Trans. Malcolm Barnes. New York City: Charles Scribner's Sons. pp. 24–34.
- Lyall, Alan (1997). The First Descent of the Matterhorn. Llandysul: Gomer Press.
- Whymper, Edward (1871). Scrambles Amongst the Alps. Illustrated by the author's engravings. London: John Murray. Condensed as Ascent of the Matterhorn (1879).
