= Catherine Louisa Pirkis =

British author and activist (1839–1910)

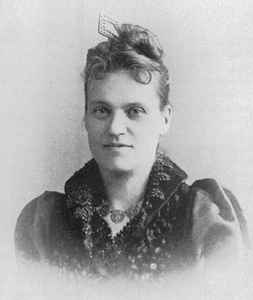
Catherine Louisa Pirkis.

Catherine Louisa Pirkis (6 October 1839 – 4 October 1910) was a British author of detective fiction and animal welfare activist. Throughout her career as a writer, Pirkis would sometimes write under the name of C. L. Pirkis, to avoid gender association.

== Biography ==
=== Early life and family ===
Catherine Louisa Lyne was born to Lewis Stephens Lyne and his wife Susan, who were of a middle-class family. Her father was an accountant and comptroller for the Inland Revenue. Her grandfather was Reverend Richard Lyne, master of a grammar school at Liskeard, Cornwall, and best known for authoring a widely used manual, The Latin Primer (1794).

Catherine was baptized at Saint John The Baptist, Shoreditch, London on 6 November 1839. She had eight siblings and the family moved around quite frequently.

=== Writing career ===
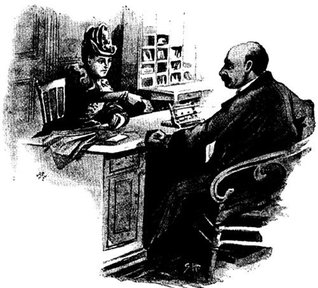
An illustration by Bernard Higden of Loveday Brooke, Lady Detective in The Ludgate Monthly for Pirkis's serial The Experiences of Loveday Brooke, Lady Detective (Feb-July 1893).

Pirkis wrote a total of 14 novels in the years spanning between 1877 and 1894 and contributed to periodicals and magazines such as Belgravia, which had been founded by the sensation novelist Mary Elizabeth Braddon. Her first major novel, Disappeared from Her Home, represented her foray into the mystery genre with the story of a young girl disappearing from her home. This would also serve as a prelude to the creation of the female detective character Loveday Brooke, for which Pirkis is best known.

The collection was serialized and featured in The Ludgate Monthly from February to July 1893, and formally published in physical book form by Hutchinson in 1894. The series followed a "casebook format", which was made popular by other reigning literary protagonists of the time like Sherlock Holmes, where detective characters had to identify the suspects of the mystery and actively set traps to capture them. The series was notable for being both female-authored and featuring a professional woman detective as the heroine.

The character Loveday Brooke was featured in "The May Magazines" edition of Glasgow Herald in 1893, where they reviewed Brooke as a character who "continues to outshine the detective Sherlock Holmes in preternatural prescience... We are just afraid Miss Brooke is too clever in catching criminals ever to catch a husband.” Specifically, this character was featured in Pirkis's final literary endeavor in 1894,The Experiences of Loveday Brooke, Lady Detective; a collection of seven detective stories that enjoyed a glowing reception. Loveday Brooke was dubbed the "female Sherlock Holmes" and her collection of stories were one of the bestselling successors to Sherlock Holmes.

=== Animal welfare activism ===
Later in life, Pirkis would combine her literary endeavours with championing for animal welfare. Together with her husband, Pirkis was one of the founders of the British National Canine Defence League in 1891. Pirkis and her husband helped to create the organization in cooperation with British aristocrat and fellow writer Lady Gertrude Georgina Stock, who wrote under the pseudonym George Douglas. Pirkis actively participated in the organization's anti-vivisectionist movement, which fought against cruel muzzling, chaining, experimentation, or treatment of dogs. In Pirkis' The Murder at Troyte's Hill in her collection The Experiences of Loveday Brooke, Lady Detective, Pirkis dramatizes the anti-vivisectionist movement by bridging the connection of human and animal physiology, satirizing vivisection, and comparing the experimentation of animals to the experiences of the working class. Pirkis was informed in these ideas by the moral philosopher and anti-vivisectionist Frances Power Cobbe, to whom Pirkis dedicated her 1887 novel A Dateless Bargain, saying that Cobbe's "noble advocacy of the rights of animals has lighted a fire of indignation in England against scientific cruelty which, by the grace of god, will never be put out".

Known today by the name Dogs Trust, the organization that Pirkis co-founded is a nonprofit animal welfare charity and humane society whose mission is to "bring about the day when all dogs can enjoy a happy life, free of maltreatment, cruelty, and the threat of unnecessary destruction." It is currently the largest charity for the welfare of dogs in the UK with 20 re-homing centers and an international re-homing center opened in November 2009 in Dublin, Ireland. The organization focuses on rehabilitation, neutering, and re-homing services for abandoned dogs while also focusing on protecting mentally-ill dogs from being euthanized.

=== Personal life and death ===
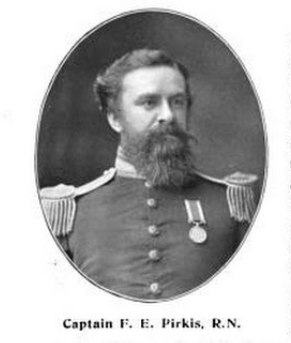
Pirkis's husband

On 19 September 1872, at the age of 32, Catherine Lyne married Frederick Edward Pirkis, who was three years her senior and a fleet-paymaster for the Royal Navy at St Luke's Church, Chelsea, in Kensington and Chelsea. In the 1881 England Census, the couple is listed as living at 1 Marsh Gate Road in Surrey, with Frederick's older brother George Ignatius Pirkis, their children's governess Tabitha Wright, and six servants.

They appear to have had two children, Norah Catherine Lyne Pirkis, born in 1873 in Putney, Surrey, and Frederick Chandos Lyne Pirkis, born in 1876 in Brussels, Belgium, as the more accurate 1891 census clarifies. Wrongly specified as the couple's children in the 1881 census, are their nephew George Middleton Cecil Pirkis, born in 1878 and designated "nephew" in the 1891 census and their niece, Margaret K.E. Pirkis, who is two years younger than her brother George. The 1891 census also shows they employed three servants and a governess, Evelyn Morehouse. Their home in Nutfield, Surrey was called the High Elms; Catherine appears to have appropriated the distinctive name in her first novel Disappeared from Her Home (1877), for the cheerful house of Mr. and Mrs. Warden that Lord Hardcastle asks to visit for comfort.

Pirkis died on 4 October 1910 after suffering from a long illness, with her husband dying only a few days afterward on 6 October. As revealed by Frederick's will, administered by the couple's eldest daughter, Norah, they had been living at 29 Redcliffe Square, Middlesex, and left £17,190 17s.5d. Catherine Lyne Pirkis is buried in Kensal Green Cemetery in London.

== Works ==
=== Novels ===
- Disappeared from Her Home. 1 vol. London: Remington and Co, 1877.
- In a World of His Own. 3 vol. London: Remington and Co, 1878.
- Trooping with Crows. 1 vol. London: Chatto and Windus, 1880.
- A Very Opal. 3 vol. London: Hurst and Blackett, 1880.
- Wanted, an Heir. 3 vol. London: Hurst and Blackett, 1881.
- Saint and Sibyl: A Story of Old Kew. 3 vol. London: Hurst and Blackett, 1882.
- Di Fawcett: One Year of her Life. 3 vol. London: Hurst and Blackett, 1883.
- Judith Wynne: A Novel. 3 vol. London: F. V. White, 1884.
- Lady Lovelace: A Novel. 3 vol. London: Chatto and Windus, 1885.
- A Dateless Bargain. 3 vol. London: Hurst and Blackett, 1887.
- The Road from Ruin: A Novel. 2 vol. London: Spencer Blackett, 1888.
- At the Moment of Victory: A Novel. 3 vol. London: Ward and Downey, 1889.
- A Red Sister: A Story of Three Days and Three Months. 3 vol. London: Sampson Low, 1891.

=== Collections ===
- The Experiences of Loveday Brooke, Lady Detective. 1 vol. London: Hutchinson, 1894.

=== Part of The Experiences of Loveday Brooke, Lady Detective Collection ===
- The Black Bag Left on a Door-Step (February 1893, The Ludgate Magazine)
- The Murder at Troyte's Hill (March 1893, The Ludgate Magazine)
- The Redhill Sisterhood (April 1893, The Ludgate Magazine)
- A Princess's Vengeance (May 1893, The Ludgate Magazine)
- Drawn Daggers (June 1893, The Ludgate Magazine)
- The Ghost of Fountain Lane (July 1893, The Ludgate Magazine)
- Missing! (February 1894, The Ludgate Magazine; 1894, The Experiences of Loveday Brooke, Lady Detective)
