= Gertrude Douglas =

Gertrude Douglas may refer to:

- Lady Gertrude Stock (1842–1893), Scottish aristocrat
- Gertrude T. Widener (1897–1970), American socialite
