= Archibald Douglas, 8th Marquess of Queensberry =

British Conservative Party politician

The Most Honourable The Marquess of Queensberry PC
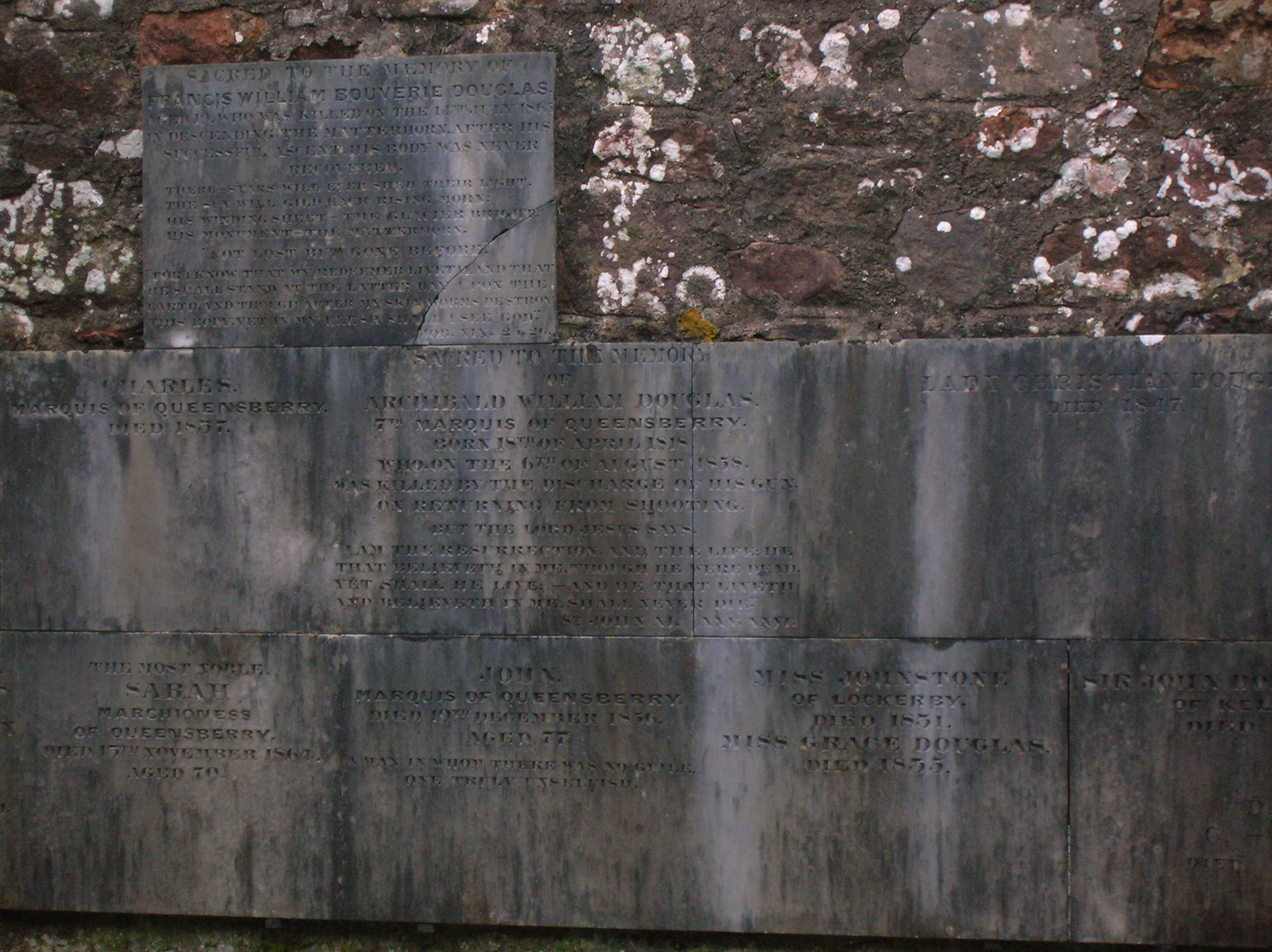
- Memorial to the 8th Marquess (2nd row, 2nd from left, styled 7th Marquis there) outside the Douglas Family Mausoleum, Cummertrees

Comptroller of the Household
- In office 4 January 1853 – 25 July 1856
- Monarch: Queen Victoria
- Prime Minister: The Earl of Aberdeen; The Viscount Palmerston
- Preceded by: The Hon George Weld-Forester
- Succeeded by: Viscount Castlerosse

Personal details
- Born: 18 April 1818
- Died: 6 August 1858 (aged 40)
- Party: Conservative
- Spouse: Caroline Clayton (m. 1840)
- Children: Lady Gertrude Stock; John Douglas, 9th Marquess of Queensberry; Lord Francis Douglas; Lord Archibald Edward Douglas; Lady Florence Dixie; Lord James Douglas
- Parent(s): John Douglas, 7th Marquess of Queensberry; Sarah Douglas

Archibald William Douglas, 8th Marquess of Queensberry PC (18 April 1818 – 6 August 1858), styled Viscount Drumlanrig between 1837 and 1856, was a British Conservative Party politician. He notably served as Comptroller of the Household between 1853 and 1856.

== Background ==
Douglas was the son of John Douglas, 7th Marquess of Queensberry, by Sarah Douglas, daughter of Major James Sholto Douglas. He became known by the courtesy title Viscount Drumlanrig when his father succeeded to the marquessate of Queensberry in 1837.

== Cricket ==
He played first-class cricket for the Marylebone Cricket Club in 1841.

== Political career ==
Lord Drumlanrig was returned to parliament for Dumfriesshire in 1847. In early 1853 he was sworn of the Privy Council and appointed Comptroller of the Household under Lord Aberdeen, a post he held until 1856, during the last year under the premiership of Lord Palmerston. In 1856 he also succeeded his father in the marquessate. However, as this was a Scottish peerage, it did not entitle him to a seat in the House of Lords. He stood down from the House of Commons in early 1857. Apart from his political career he was also Lord-Lieutenant of Dumfriesshire from 1850 to 1858.

== Family ==
Lord Queensberry married Caroline Margaret Clayton (1821–1904), daughter of General Sir William Clayton, 5th Baronet, at Gretna Green, Scotland, in 1840. They had six children:

- Lady Gertrude Georgina Douglas (died 1893), a writer, who married Thomas Stock.
- John Sholto Douglas, 9th Marquess of Queensberry (1844–1900), the man behind the Marquess of Queensberry rules that formed the basis of modern boxing, and, much later, the downfall of author and playwright Oscar Wilde.
- Lord Francis William Bouverie Douglas (1847–1865), beaten by A. W. Moore and party by a day to first ascent of the Ober Gabelhorn, killed a week later in the first successful ascent of the Matterhorn.
- Reverend Lord Archibald Edward Douglas (1850–1938).
- Lady Florence Caroline Douglas (1855–1905) (twin), war correspondent, travel writer, and feminist.
- Lord James Edward Sholto Douglas (1855–1891) (twin), married in 1888 racehorse breeder Martha Lucy Hennessy (mother of George Hennessy, 1st Baron Windlesham). James committed suicide in 1891 by cutting his throat with a razor in a London hotel.

== Death ==
Lord Queensberry died while hunting in August 1858 aged forty, officially from the explosion of his gun. However, the event was widely believed to be a suicide. The Marchioness of Queensberry died in February 1904. He is buried in the family burial ground at Gooley Hill, near Kinmount House.

Parliament of the United Kingdom
Preceded by John Hope-Johnstone	Member of Parliament for Dumfriesshire; 1847–1857	Succeeded by John Hope-Johnstone
Political offices
Preceded by Hon. George Weld-Forester	Comptroller of the Household; 1853–1856	Succeeded by Viscount Castlerosse
Honorary titles
Preceded by The Marquess of Queensberry	Lord-Lieutenant of Dumfriesshire; 1850–1858	Succeeded by The Duke of Buccleuch
Peerage of Scotland
Preceded by John Douglas	Marquess of Queensberry; 1856–1858	Succeeded by John Sholto Douglas
