= Matterhorn Glacier =

Glacier of the Pennine Alps

- Matterhorngletscher
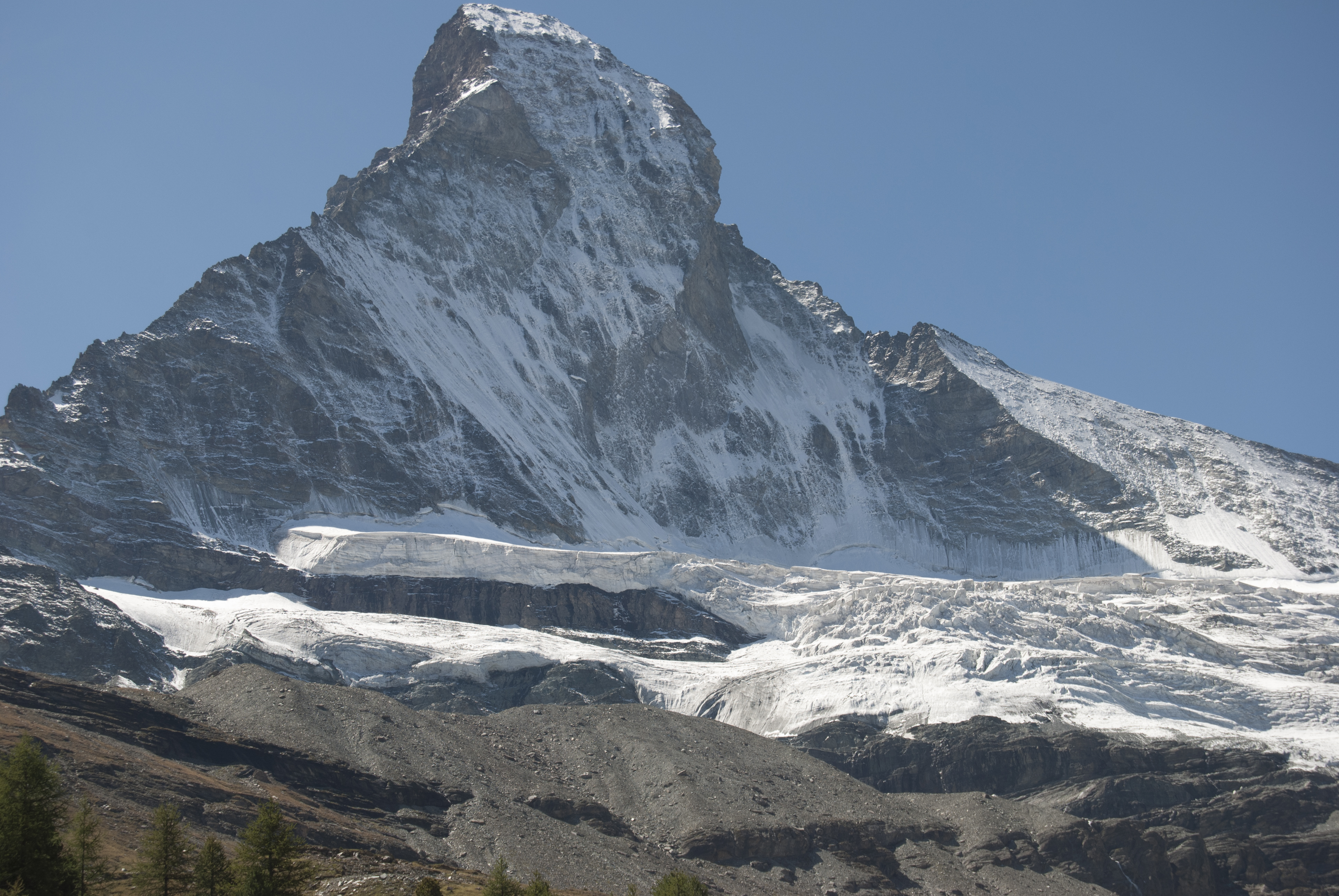

- Location within Switzerland Location within Canton of Valais Location within Alps
- Type: Cirque glacier
- Location: Valais, Switzerland
- Coordinates: 45°59′01″N 7°39′30″E

The Matterhorn Glacier (German: Matterhorngletscher) is a glacier of the Pennine Alps, located at the base of the north face of the Matterhorn (4478m above the sea), south of Zermatt. It has a maximum width of approximately 2.5 km and reaches a minimum height of 2,800 metres. The glacier lies within the basin of the Zmutt Glacier.

In 1865, following the first ascent of the Matterhorn, four climbers died in a fall on the way down from the summit. Three of the dead were retrieved several days later on the Matterhorn Glacier, but the remains of Lord Francis Douglas were never found.
