= Gloriana (name) =

Name list

Gloriana is a female given name. Notable people with the name include:

- Gloriana Pellissier (born 1976), Italian ski mountaineer and mountain runner
- Gloriana Ranocchini (1957–1993), Sammarinese Captain Regent of San Marino
- Gloriana St. Clair (born 1939), American librarian and scholar
- Gloriana Villalobos (born 1999), Costa Rican footballer
- Gloriana Sánchez (born 2007), Costa Rican rhythmic gymnast

== Fiction ==
- Glory (character) (Gloriana Demeter), Image Comics character
- Jane Gloriana Villanueva, character on Jane the Virgin played by Gina Rodriguez
- The State of Gloriana, a fictional state set to be featured in Grand Theft Auto VI, based on the state of Georgia (U.S. state).

== See also ==
- Gloriana (disambiguation)
