= Lord Lieutenant of Dumfries =

Ceremonial officer in Dumfries, Scotland

This is a list of people who have served as Lord-Lieutenant of Dumfries.

- William Douglas, 4th Duke of Queensberry 17 March 1794 – 1797
- Charles Montagu-Scott, 4th Duke of Buccleuch 17 November 1797 – 20 April 1819
- Charles Douglas, 6th Marquess of Queensberry 8 June 1819 – 3 December 1837
- John Douglas, 7th Marquess of Queensberry 8 December 1837 – 1850
- Archibald Douglas, 8th Marquess of Queensberry 31 August 1850 – 1858
- William Montagu-Douglas-Scott, 6th Duke of Buccleuch 18 March 1858 – 5 November 1914
- John Montagu-Douglas-Scott, 7th Duke of Buccleuch 4 January 1915 – 19 October 1935
- Francis Carruthers 29 January 1936 – 22 May 1945
- Sir Hugh Gladstone 14 January 1946 – 5 April 1949
- Sir John Crabbe 22 July 1949 – 1 November 1961
- James Scott-Elliot 27 March 1962 – 1967
- Sir Arthur Duncan 27 November 1967 – 1970
- Kenneth McCall 14 January 1970 – 1973
- Sir William Turner 7 January 1973 – 1982
- Arthur Patterson 5 May 1982 – 10 February 1988
- John Home 16 August 1988 – 1991
- Captain Ronald Cunningham-Jardine 16 December 1991 – 2006
- Jean Tulloch 19 August 2006 – 2016
- Fiona Armstrong (MacGregor) 10 February 2016 – present
