= John Douglas, 9th Marquess of Queensberry =

British nobleman (1844–1900)

The Most Honourable The Marquess of Queensberry
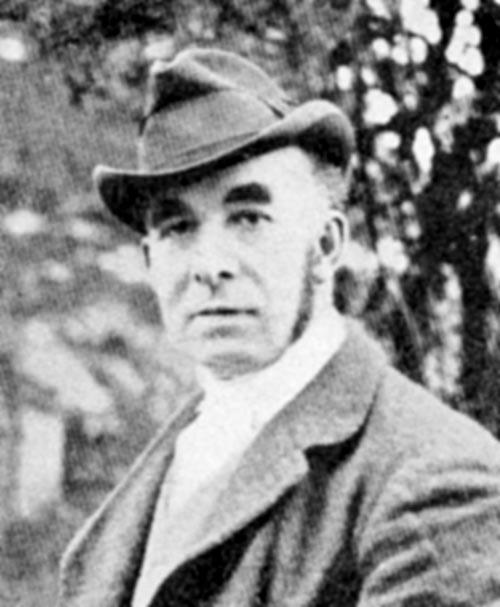
- Lord Queensberry in 1896
- Tenure: 6 August 1858 – 31 January 1900
- Born: 20 July 1844; Florence, Grand Duchy of Tuscany, Italy
- Died: 31 January 1900 (aged 55); London, England
- Spouses: Sibyl Montgomery (m. 1866; div. 1887) Ethel Weeden (m. 1893; ann. 1894)
- Issue: Francis Douglas, Viscount Drumlanrig; Percy Douglas, 10th Marquess of Queensberry; Lord Alfred Douglas; Lord Sholto Douglas; Lady Edith Douglas
- Father: Archibald Douglas, 8th Marquess of Queensberry
- Mother: Caroline Margaret Clayton

Member of the House of Lords Lord Temporal
- In office 6 August 1858 – 31 January 1900; Hereditary Peerage
- Preceded by: Archibald Douglas, 8th Marquess of Queensberry
- Succeeded by: Percy Douglas, 10th Marquess of Queensberry

John Sholto Douglas, 9th Marquess of Queensberry (20 July 1844 – 31 January 1900) was a British nobleman of the Victorian era, remembered for his atheism, his outspoken views, his brutish manner, for lending his name to the "Queensberry Rules" that form the basis of modern boxing, and for his role in the downfall of the Irish author and playwright Oscar Wilde.

== Biography ==
John Douglas was born in Florence, Italy, the eldest son of Conservative politician Archibald, Viscount Drumlanrig, and Caroline Margaret Clayton. He had three brothers, Francis, Archibald, and James, and two sisters, Gertrude and Florence. He was briefly styled Viscount Drumlanrig following his father's succession in 1856, and on the latter's death in 1858 he inherited the Marquessate of Queensberry. The 9th Marquess was educated in the training ships Illustrious and Britannia at Portsmouth, and served in the Royal Navy until resigning in 1864. He was Lieutenant-Colonel commanding the 1st Dumfriesshire Rifle Volunteers from 1869 to 1871.

In 1864, Lord Queensberry entered Magdalene College, Cambridge, which he left two years later without taking a degree. He was more distinguished in sport, playing college cricket as well as running, hunting, and steeplechasing. He married Sibyl Montgomery in 1866. They had four sons and a daughter; his wife successfully sued for divorce in 1887 on the grounds of his adultery. She survived him to the age of 90, dying in 1935. Queensberry married Ethel Weeden in 1893, but this marriage was annulled the following year.

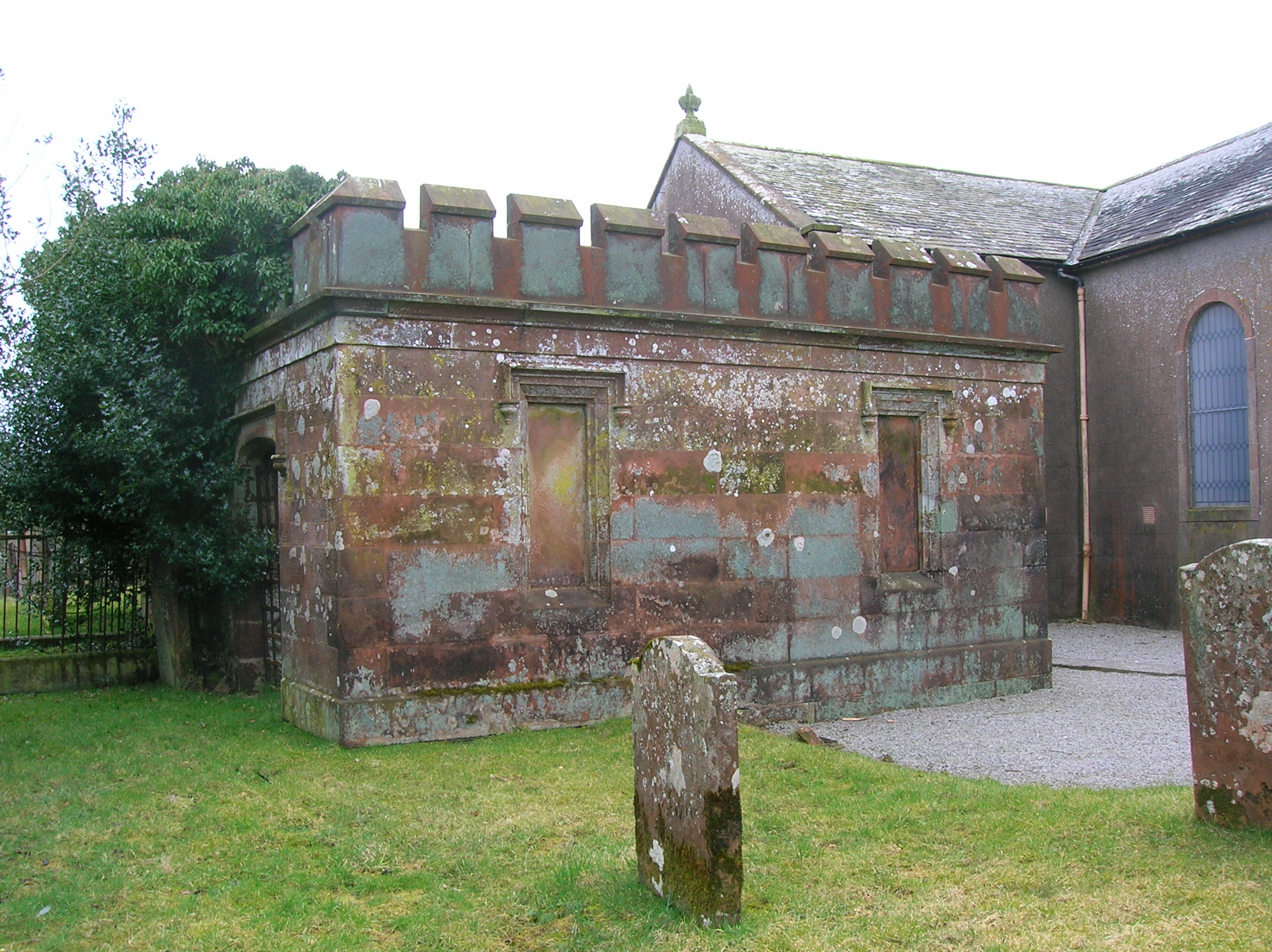
The Douglas Mausoleum outside Cummertrees Parish Church in Dumfries and Galloway, traditional burial place of the Marquesses of Queensberry

Queensberry sold the family seat of Kinmount in Dumfriesshire, Scotland, an action which further alienated him from his family.

His eldest son and heir apparent was Francis, Viscount Drumlanrig, who was rumoured to have been engaged in a homosexual relationship with the Liberal Prime Minister, Archibald Primrose, 5th Earl of Rosebery. Lord Drumlanrig died from a gunshot wound, unmarried and without children.

Douglas's second son, Lord Percy Douglas (1868–1920), succeeded to the peerage instead. Lord Alfred "Bosie" Douglas, his third son, was a close friend of famous author and poet Oscar Wilde. Eventually it became known that Lord Alfred and Wilde had engaged in sexual intercourse on multiple occasions, severely damaging the reputation of both men and enraging Queensberry. Queensberry's efforts to end that relationship ultimately led to his famous dispute with Wilde, which would culminate in Wilde's eventual imprisonment, decline, and fall.

Queensberry died, two months after a stroke, and after a period of mental decline believed to be caused by syphilis, in his club room in Welbeck Street, west London, aged 55, nearly a year before Oscar Wilde's death. He wrote a poem starting with the words "When I am dead cremate me." After cremation at Woking Crematorium, his ashes were buried at Kinmount in the Douglas Mausoleum outside Cummertrees Parish Church, a Church of Scotland.

== Contributions to sports ==
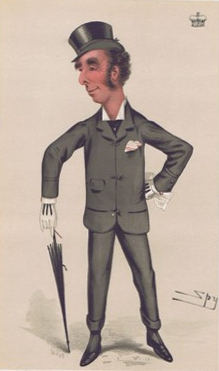
1877 caricature of Queensberry in Vanity Fair. Caption reads: "a good light weight".

Queensberry was a patron of sport and a noted boxing enthusiast. In 1866 he was one of the founders of the Amateur Athletic Club, now the Amateur Athletic Association of England, one of the first groups that did not require amateur athletes to belong to the upper-classes to compete. The following year the Club published a set of twelve rules for conducting boxing matches. The rules had been drawn up by John Graham Chambers but appeared under Queensberry's sponsorship and are universally known as the "Queensberry Rules". These rules were eventually to govern the sport worldwide.

He was one of the first people to bring association football to Scotland, forming his own team—called Kinmount—of which he was captain to take on the Annan N.B. team in matches in 1868. As the Annan side wore red caps, the Kinmount side wore blue caps.

A keen rider, Queensberry was also active in fox hunting and owned several successful race horses. As a rider his first winner was in the Dumfriesshire Hunt Club chase in 1865, and his last was at Sandown Park in 1883. He was Master of the Worcester Fox Hounds in 1870. He was on the committee of the National Hunt but never won a Grand National as a rider, a last-minute substitution on the victorious "Old Joe" keeping him out of the 1886 National. During his riding career he recovered from a series of serious injuries.

== Political career ==
In 1872, Queensberry was chosen by the Peers of Scotland to sit in the House of Lords as a Scottish representative peer. He served as such until 1880, when he was again nominated but refused to take the religious oath of allegiance to the sovereign. Viewed by some as an outspoken atheist, he declared that he would not participate in any "Christian tomfoolery" and that his word should suffice. As a consequence neither he nor Charles Bradlaugh, who had also refused to take the oath after being elected to the House of Commons, were allowed to take their seats in Parliament. This prompted an apology from the new prime minister, William Gladstone. Bradlaugh was re-elected four times by the constituents of Northampton until he was finally allowed to take his seat in 1886. Queensberry, however, was never again sent to Parliament by the Scottish nobles.

In 1881, Queensberry accepted the presidency of the British Secular Union, a group that had broken away in 1877 from Bradlaugh's National Secular Society. That year he published a long philosophical poem, The Spirit of the Matterhorn, which he had written in Zermatt in 1873 in an attempt to articulate his secularist views. In 1882, he was ejected from the theatre after loudly interrupting a performance of the play The Promise of May by Alfred, Lord Tennyson, the Poet Laureate, because it included a villainous atheist in its cast of characters. Under the auspices of the British Secular Union, Queensberry wrote a pamphlet entitled The Religion of Secularism and the Perfectibility of Man. The Union, always small, ceased to function in 1884.

His divorces, brutality, atheism, and association with the boxing world made Queensberry an unpopular figure in London high society. In 1893 his eldest son Francis was made a baron in the Peerage of the United Kingdom, thus giving him an automatic seat in the House of Lords. Queensberry resented his son sitting in a chamber that had refused to admit him, leading to a bitter dispute between himself and both his son and the Earl of Rosebery, who had promoted Francis's ennoblement and who shortly thereafter became prime minister. Francis was killed in a shooting accident in 1894; the inquest returned an "accidental death" verdict, but his death may have been a suicide. Queensberry believed, as he put it in a letter, that "snob queers like Rosebery" had corrupted his sons, and held Rosebery responsible for Francis's death.

== Dispute with Oscar Wilde ==
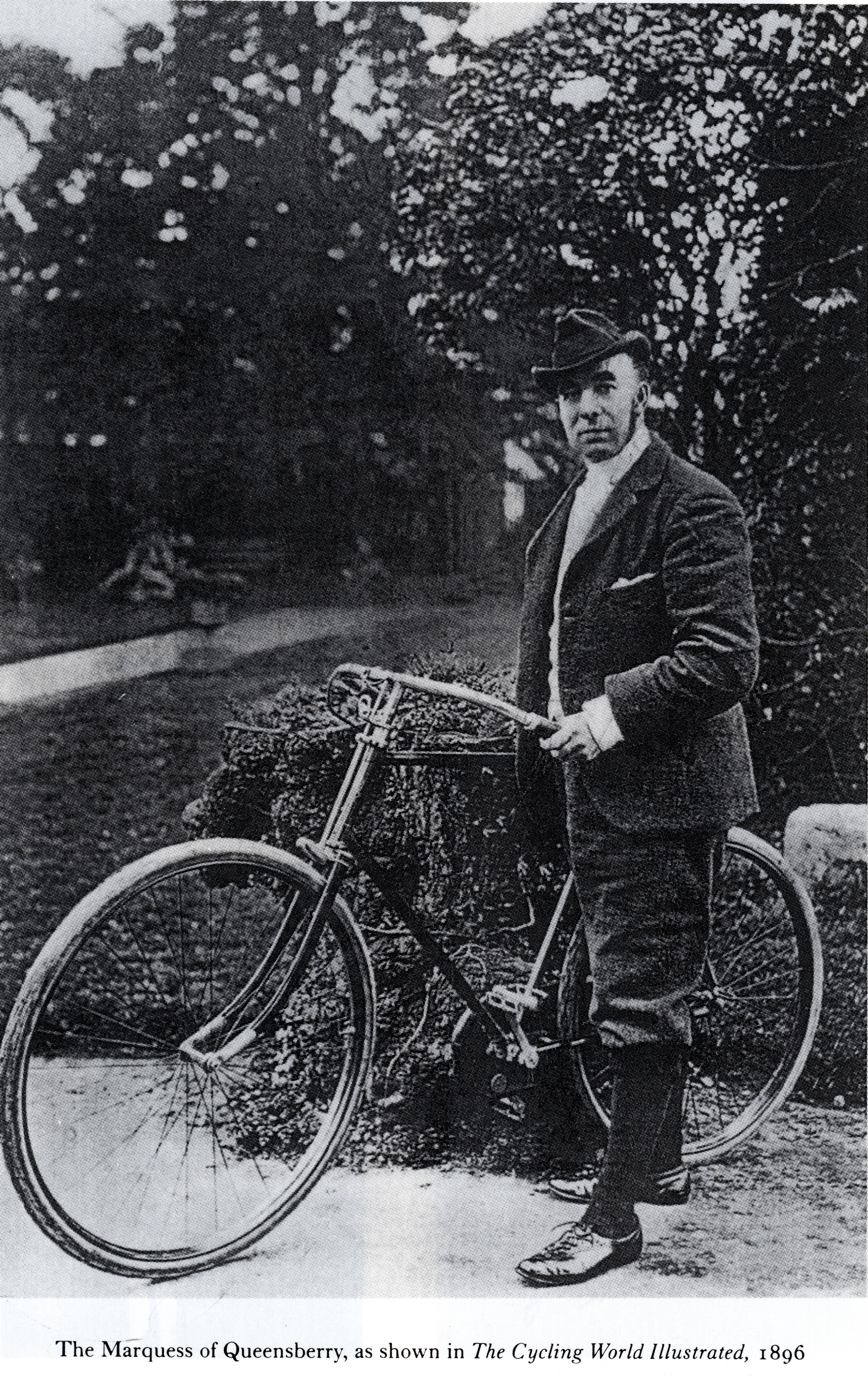
John Douglas, 9th Marquess of Queensberry (1896)

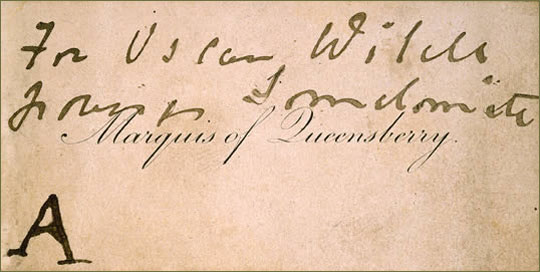
The card which was the basis of the lawsuit.

In February 1895, angered by the apparent ongoing homosexual relationship between his son Alfred and Oscar Wilde, Queensberry left a calling card reading "For Oscar Wilde, posing Somdomite [sic]" at Wilde's club. Wilde sued for criminal libel, leading to Queensberry's arrest.

The trial opened at the Old Bailey on 3 April 1895 before Justice Richard Henn Collins amid scenes of near hysteria both in the press and the public galleries. Queensberry's lawyers, headed by barrister Edward Carson, presented Wilde as a vicious older man who seduced innocent young boys into a life of degenerate homosexuality. Wilde dropped the libel case when Queensberry's lawyers informed the court that they intended to call several male prostitutes as witnesses to testify that they had had sex with Wilde. According to the Libel Act 1843, proving the truth of the accusation and a public interest in its exposure was a defence against a libel charge, and Wilde's lawyers concluded that the prostitutes' testimony was likely to do that. Queensberry won a counterclaim against Wilde for the expenses he had incurred from lawyers and private detectives in organizing his defence. Wilde was left bankrupt; his assets were later seized and sold at auction to pay the claim.

Queensberry then sent the evidence collected by his detectives to Scotland Yard, which resulted in Wilde being charged and convicted of gross indecency under the Criminal Law Amendment Act 1885 and sentenced to two years' hard labour, which he served (1895–1897). Upon release, Wilde immediately went into exile in France, his health and reputation destroyed.

Queensberry died on 31 January 1900. Ten months later, Oscar Wilde died at the Hotel d'Alsace in Paris.

== Screen portrayals ==
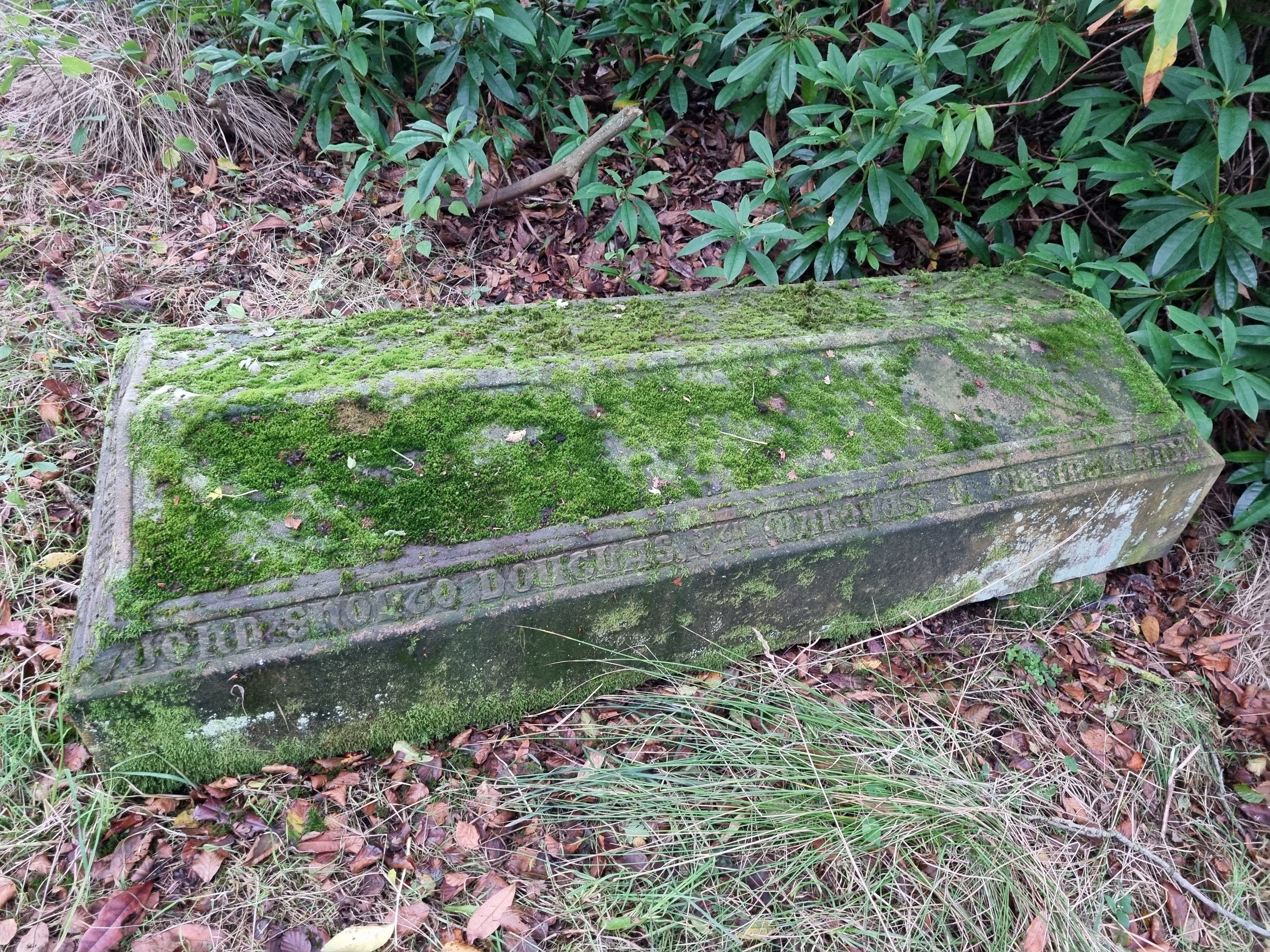
Gravestone of John Sholto Douglas at Gooley Hill, Kinmount House

Queensberry has been portrayed by a number of actors in later dramatisations of the Wilde-Alfred Douglas affair, notably:

- Edward Chapman in 20th Century Fox movie Oscar Wilde (1960).
- Lionel Jeffries in United Artists movie The Trials of Oscar Wilde (1960)
- Keith Richards in promotional film for the Rolling Stones song, “We Love You” (1967)
- Tom Wilkinson in biographical film Wilde (1997).
- Tom Andrews in historical drama A Thousand Blows (2025).

An effeminately flamboyant caricature of him, voiced by Jim Rash, is featured as a main character in the Adult Swim cartoon Mike Tyson Mysteries in which he serves as a lifestyle coach to Mike Tyson.

Peerage of Scotland
Preceded by Archibald Douglas	Marquess of Queensberry; 1858–1900	Succeeded by Percy Douglas
