= O'Donnell baronets =

Extinct baronetcy in the Baronetage of Ireland

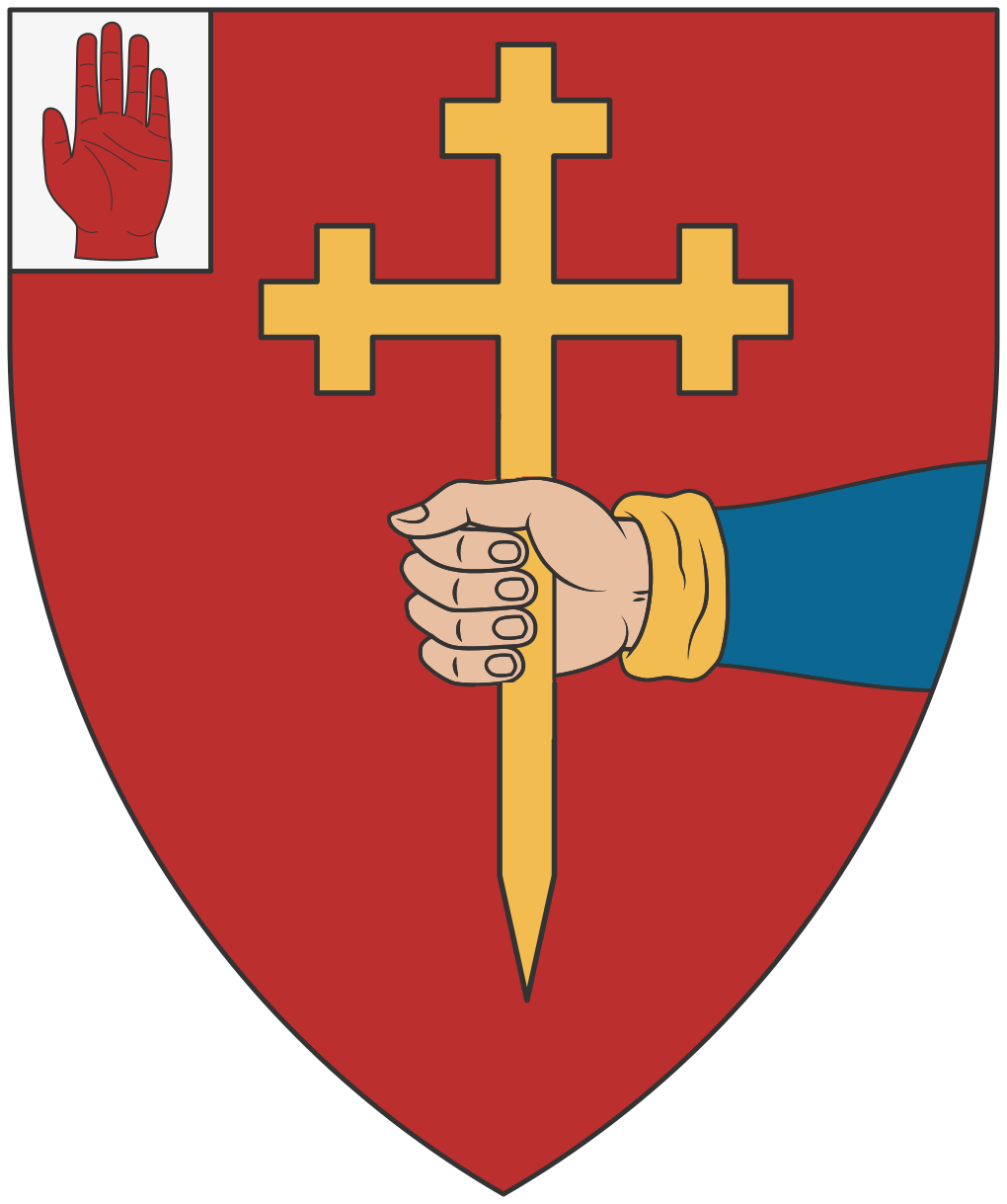
The coat of arms of the O'Donnell of Newport House, Baronets.

The O'Donnell Baronetcy, of Newport House in the County of Mayo, was a title in the Baronetage of Ireland. It was created on 22 December 1780 for Neale O'Donnell. Initially a Catholic, he renounced this faith and became a Protestant before being created a baronet. Hugh O'Donnell, eldest son of the first Baronet, sat as a member of the Irish House of Commons for Donegal Borough, and James Moore O'Donnell, second son of the first Baronet, was member for Ratoath. Both were opposed to the Act of Union and predeceased their father. The latter was succeeded by his third son, Neale, the second Baronet. The title became dormant on the death of the fifth Baronet in 1889.

Neale was the great-great-great-grandson of Niall Garve O'Donnell, a Gaelic Irish nobleman who assisted royal forces during the Nine Years' War.

== O'Donnell baronets, of Newport House (1780) ==
- Sir Neale O'Donnell, 1st Baronet (died 1811)
- Sir Neale O'Donnell, 2nd Baronet (died 1827)
- Sir Hugh James Moore O'Donnell, 3rd Baronet (1806–1828)
- Sir Richard Annesley O'Donnell, 4th Baronet (1808–1878)
- Sir George Clendining O'Donnell, 5th Baronet (1832–1889)
