= Caroline Douglas =

Irish nationalist & benefactor (1821-1904)

The Most Honourable The Dowager Marchioness of Queensberry
- Born: Caroline Margaret Clayton; 13 July 1821; Ballylickey, County Cork, Ireland
- Died: 14 February 1904 (aged 82); Glen Stuart, Annan, Dumfries and Galloway
- Spouse: Archibald Douglas (m. 1840; died 1858)
- Children: Lady Gertrude Stock; John Douglas, 9th Marquess of Queensberry; Lord Francis Douglas; Lord Archibald Edward Douglas; Lady Florence Dixie; Lord James Douglas
- Parents: Sir William Clayton (father); Alice O'Donnell (mother)

Caroline Alice Margaret Douglas, Dowager Marchioness of Queensberry (née Clayton; 13 July 1821 – 14 February 1904) was an Anglo-Irish peer and Irish nationalist benefactor.

== Early life and family ==
Caroline Douglas was born in 1821 at Ballylickey House near Bantry Bay in County Cork, Ireland. Her father was English, Sir William Clayton, a retired British army general and one of the members of parliament for Marlow, Buckinghamshire. Her mother, Alice Clayton (born O'Donnell), was from County Mayo, and was a Roman Catholic, but despite this the couple's four children were raised as Anglicans. Douglas lived in Bantry, County Cork, until the age of two, when the family moved to England to the family seat of Harleyford House, Buckinghamshire. This house was regularly visited by royalty and politicians, including Napoleon III. When her father refused to give his consent for her to marry Archibald Douglas, Lord Drumlanrig, the couple eloped and were married at Gretna Green on 28 May 1840. The couple went on to have five sons and two daughters: Gertrude, John, Francis, Archibald, and twins James and Florence. One son died in infancy. Their marriage suffered, due to her husband's gambling and adultery.

== Roman Catholicism ==
The Marquess died in 1858 in a hunting accident, leaving his widow to live what has been described as a "restless life." She travelled between fashionable resorts in Britain and Europe and the Douglas estate, Glen Stuart, in Dumfries, Scotland. In 1861, she converted to Roman Catholicism, shocking her family. She became aware that her mother-in-law planned to take her children away from her, prompting her to flee to France with her youngest children, Archibald, then twelve, and Florence and James, aged seven, where she could educate them as she wished. This led the children's guardians to threaten her with an action under English law to take her children away from her. The three were too young to choose a guardian under Scottish law. In the event, they remained in France for two years. Falconer Atlee, the British Consul at Nantes, offered them a place of safety when their first location was discovered, and the Emperor Napoleon III eventually extended Lady Queensberry his protection, ensuring that she could keep the custody of the three children. Eventually, it was agreed that Caroline would retain custody of her younger children, and they returned to England in 1864, when her mother-in-law's health started to decline.

Archibald eventually became a Roman Catholic priest. Gertrude also converted, and as her Anglican fiancé would not agree to their children being brought up in her faith, the engagement was broken off. She entered the Good Shepherd convent in Hammersmith and completed her novitiate to take her black veil of profession in 1867, but later left the order.

== Political activism ==
Douglas always considered herself to be Irish and favoured the cause of Irish Home Rule. In 1867 she caused a scandal in London society by raising money towards the defence of the Manchester Martyrs, writing to all three men while they were in prison and sending a cheque for £100 to help to support their dependents. She continued to support Irish nationalism, regardless of the cold reception she received in English society because of it, and wrote pamphlets on the subject, including Let there be light (1867). She also regularly wrote letters to newspapers about the Irish question and was a regular donor to Irish radicals. There were rumours that she funded a Fenian newspaper clandestinely.

Douglas supported a number of Scottish Roman Catholic charities and helped her son Archibald in his parish duties. It is believed she corresponded with James Connolly from 1896 to 1903 and was a subscriber to the Irish Socialist Republican Party's literature. It was incorrectly assumed that she became a nun later in life, due to a letter she wrote to John Devoy from a Franciscan convent in Bayswater. In fact, she lived in Boulogne on a small annuity bequeathed to her by her father, but was at Glen Stuart, Annan, Dumfries and Galloway when she died on 14 February 1904. She was listed among "The Devoted Friends of the Manchester Martyrs" on the National Monument erected in 1906 in Grand Parade, Cork.
