= Lady Gertrude Stock =

English writer

Lady Gertrude Georgina Stock (née Douglas; 21 August 1842 – 25 November 1893) was a Scottish aristocrat and novelist, who also wrote under the pseudonym George Douglas. In 1891 she founded the National Canine Defence League (today known as Dogs Trust) to protect dogs from "torture and ill-usage of every kind".

== Life ==
Gertrude Douglas was the daughter of Archibald Douglas, 8th Marquess of Queensberry and his wife Caroline Margaret Alice Clayton (died 1864). Like her mother, she converted to Roman Catholicism.

Her novels include Brown as a Berry (1874, as George Douglas). Her fiction has been described as "robust" and featuring "hoydenish heroines".

== Founding of Dogs Trust ==
Lady Gertrude Stock brought together a "small party of gentlemen" in the "Royal Agricultural Hall" in Islington, during the first Crufts dog show. The National Canine Defence League began operations funded entirely by donations from members and supporters. The group campaigned for the protection of strays, the provision of proper veterinary care and to campaign against muzzling, prolonged chaining and experimentation on dogs, which was a common practice at the time. By 1902 membership had risen to 1,000.
