= Kinmount House =

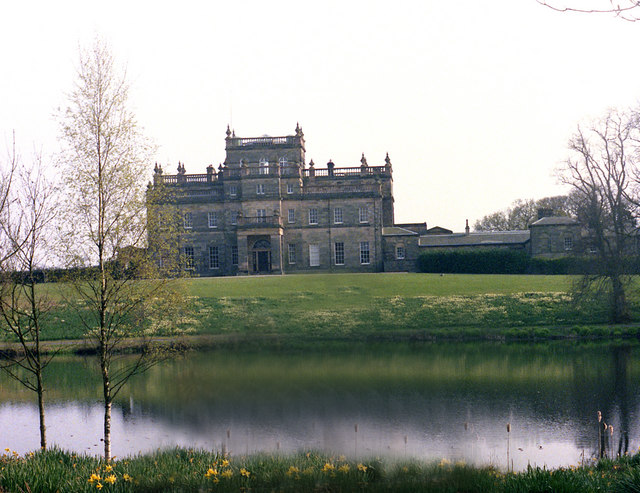
- Kinmount House

- Shown within Dumfries and Galloway
- 55°00′19″N 3°20′45″W
- Location: Dumfries and Galloway, Scotland, United Kingdom

Listed Building – Category A
- Official name: Kinmount House
- Designated: 3 August 1971
- Reference no.: LB3582

Inventory of Gardens and Designed Landscapes in Scotland
- Official name: Kinmount
- Designated: 1 July 1987
- Reference no.: GDL00244

Kinmount House is a 19th-century country house in the parish of Cummertrees in the historic county of Dumfriesshire in Dumfries and Galloway region, Scotland. It is located 3 1/2 miles (5.6 km) west of Annan. The house was designed by Sir Robert Smirke for the 6th Marquess of Queensberry and completed in 1820. It is protected as a category A listed building, and the grounds are included on the Inventory of Gardens and Designed Landscapes in Scotland.

== History ==
The lands of Kinmount were granted to the Carlyle family in the 13th century and acquired by William Douglas, 1st Earl of Queensberry, in 1633. The 4th Duke of Queensberry carried out extensive planting on the estate in the late 18th century. On his death in 1810, Kinmount passed to the 6th Marquess of Queensberry, who commissioned a new house from the English architect Sir Robert Smirke. The Greek Revival house was built between 1813 and 1820, with Smirke's assistant William Burn acting as executant architect. The masonry was carved by John Park using stone brought from Cove quarry near Kirkpatrick-Fleming.

In 1896, The 9th Marquess of Queensberry sold Kinmount to Edward Brook, a wealthy English industrialist who had bought the adjacent Hoddom Castle estate in the 1870s. Brook commissioned alterations and extensions to the house from Dumfries architects James Barbour and J. M. Bowie. These included the roof balustrades and urns and the service court to the northwest. The house found use as Kinmount Auxiliary Hospital during both the First and Second World Wars. In 1983 the house and 13 acres (5.3 ha) of its ground were bought by Ivo Pogorelić. Between 1988 and 1998 the house was owned by Steve Ovett.

The house was owned by Kinmount Leisure Ltd, which rents out holiday accommodation with access to outdoor sports. The Kinmount and Hoddom estates are owned by the Brook family trust. The Brook family has begun a restoration of Kinmount and now offers wedding, and leisure accommodations.

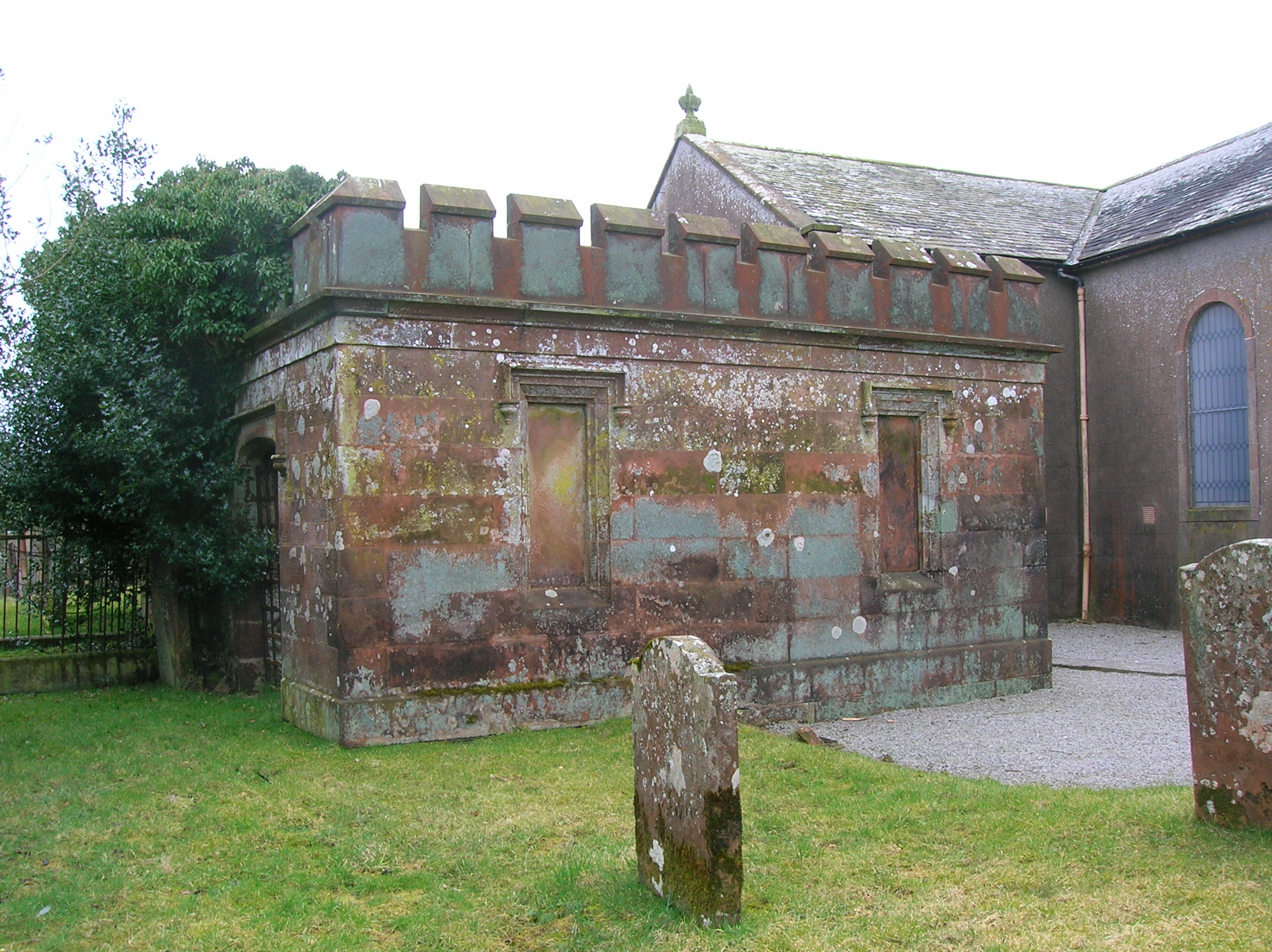
The Douglas Family Mausoleum at Cummertrees Parish Church, traditional burial place of the Marquesses of Queensberry

The Queensberry family burial ground is within the bounds of Kinmount House on Gooley Hill. The burial ground contains several sculptured monuments from the late-19th and early-20th centuries, a tall Celtic cross, and is surrounded by a circular iron fence.
