= Lord Archibald Edward Douglas =

Reverend Lord Archibald Edward Douglas (1850–1938) was the son of Archibald Douglas, 8th Marquess of Queensberry and his wife Caroline Margaret Clayton, daughter of General Sir William Clayton, 5th Baronet (1786–1866). Reverend Lord Archibald Douglas was a Roman Catholic priest who arranged the emigration of children to Canada as part of the child migration movement, whose stated goal was to place these children on farms, in sparsely settled parts of the world where they would receive training, and be able to start farms of their own. The movement was controversial from its inception, being accused of forcing the children to emigrate, of breaking up families, and of placing the children in a situation hardly different from slavery. Douglas sent children to the Ottawa area, to Manitoba, and into Quebec.

== St. Vincent's Home ==
In 1874, Father Lord Archibald Douglas became Head of St Vincent's Home for Destitute Boys, in Brook Green Lane, Hammersmith, London. There he started a printing press and bakery to provide work for the boys. The home moved to 333/339 Harrow Road, Paddington, London, in 1876. He used his own private means to purchase and run the Home, and was assisted for a time by his sister Gertrude.

He changed the policy of the Home, and took in boys of greatest need. Under Father Douglas a threefold development took place.

1. Boys from all parts of the country for whom no patron could be found were received.
2. Appeal was made to the public conscience for funds.
3. An extensive program was initiated, to organise the emigration of children to Canada.

Rev. Lord Archibald Douglas edited a monthly magazine called Boys and Girls and published by The Southwark Diocesan Council and Rescue Society, to encourage interest and support for its work.

== Southwark Catholic Emigration Society ==
Father Douglas first arrived in Canada on 2 July 1882 aboard the Peruvian. Accompanying him were his first party of children. He accompanied a group of forty boys to Manitoba.

Exactly when the Southwark Catholic Emigration Society was formed is unclear, but the first formal report of the arrival in Canada of children sent by the Southwark Society dates to 1893 when 45 boys landed at Quebec. The following year there were 17 more. Over the next three years a further 84 boys were sent, taken either by the Rev. Edward St John or by the Rev. Lord Archibald Douglas, the joint secretaries overseeing the emigration. Lord Archibald Douglas was instrumental in the formation of the Canadian Catholic Emigration Society, which was headquartered in Westminster, London. The Society absorbed the emigration work of the Southwark Rescue Society which commenced in 1892, and the work of emigration of the archdiocese of Westminster.

A reception Home (New Orpington Lodge, later St. George's Home) was established in Hintonburg, Ottawa, in 1895. In addition, land was obtained in Manitoba in 1895, and in 1897 the New Southwark Training Farm was opened in the village of Makinak in the Lake Dauphin district of Manitoba.

The Society selected the children from industrial and Poor Law schools, and from other sources. It sent them, under escort, to Canada. The escorts also supervised the work of the agency there. Parties of 40 to 60 children were sent out at intervals.

On retirement, by which time he was close to bankruptcy, he returned to his native Scotland, and St Vincent was given over to Father Douglas Hope.

== Note ==
Home Children is a common term used to refer to the child migration scheme founded by Annie MacPherson in 1869, under which more than 100,000 children were sent to Australia, Canada, New Zealand, and South Africa from the United Kingdom.
