= Samuel Bradley =

Lieutenant-Colonel Samuel Glenholme Lennox Bradley DSO DCM MC (1869–1930s) was a British soldier of the Boer War and First World War.
