= A Grammar of the Bengal Language =

1778 grammar book by Nathaniel Braasey Halhed

Grammar of the Bengal Language
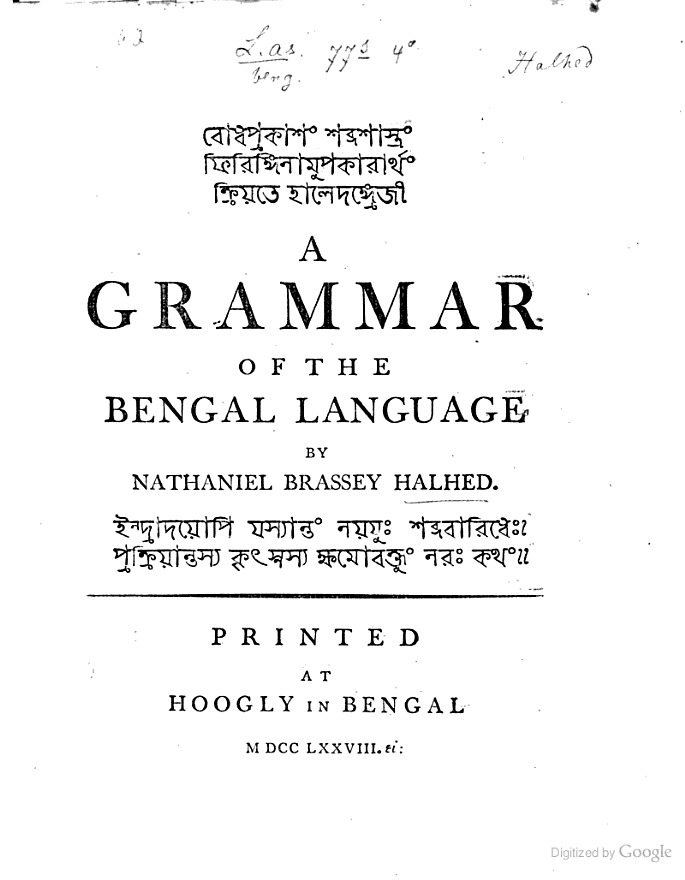
- Title page of the book, edition 1778
- Author: Nathaniel Brassey Halhed
- Original title: A Grammar of the Bengal Language
- Language: English
- Subject: Bengali grammar
- Genre: Grammar
- Published: 1778
- Publication place: Bengal Presidency
- Media type: Printed
- Pages: 217 (first edition)
- OCLC: 457571405
- Preceded by: A Code of Gentoo Laws (1776)

A Grammar of the Bengal Language is a 1778 modern Bengali grammar book written in English by Nathaniel Brassey Halhed. This is the first grammar book of the Bengali language that used Bengali types in print for the first time. The book, published in 1778, was probably printed from the Mr. Andrews’ press in Hooghly, Bengal Presidency.

== See also ==
- Bengali grammar
