= Bengali grammar =

Grammar of the Bengali language

Bengali grammar (Bengali: বাংলা ব্যাকরণ Bangla bêkôrôn) is the study of the morphology and syntax of Bengali, an Indo-European language primarily spoken in the Bengal region of South Asia.

Bengali has two standard forms, চলিত ভাষা (chôlito bhasha) and সাধু ভাষা (sadhu bhasha). The grammar discussed below applies fully only to the chôlito form, also called Standard Colloquial Bengali (SCB) or referred to by many Bengalis as শুদ্ধ বাংলা (shuddho bangla, lit. correct Bengali). (Note: SCB can be further divided into Kolkata Colloquial Bengali (KCB) and Dhaka Colloquial Bengali (DCB). Differences between the two will be mentioned below where applicable and often generalized to West Bengal or Bangladesh, respectively.) SCB is the register used by the majority of educated speakers for speaking and writing in both Bangladesh and West Bengal. Sadhu bhasha is generally considered outdated and its use in Bengali writing is at present very limited.

SCB is based on the regional dialect of Rarh, specifically the Nadia-Kushtia variety. Other regions of Bengal also possess their own native dialects of Bengali. These dialects, which are still pervasive in spoken speech (particularly in rural areas), vary by region and can differ dramatically from SCB, sometimes to the point of near-unintelligibility.

Although Bengali is typically written in the Bengali script, a romanization scheme is also used here to outline the pronunciation.

== Pronouns ==
=== Personal pronouns ===
Bengali personal pronouns are somewhat similar to English pronouns, having different words for first, second, and third person, and also for singular and plural (unlike for verbs, below). Bengali pronouns do not differentiate for gender; that is, the same pronoun may be used for "he" or "she". However, Bengali has different third-person pronouns for proximity. The first are used for someone who is present in the discussion, and the second are for those who are nearby but not present in the discussion. The third are usually for those who are not present. In daily speech, speakers may often ignore some of these distinctions. Additionally, each of the second- and third-person pronouns have different forms for the familiar and polite forms; the second person also has a "very familiar" form (sometimes called "despective"). It may be noted that the "very familiar" form is used when addressing particularly close friends or family as well as for addressing subordinates or in abusive language.

In the following tables, the abbreviations used are as follows:

VF = very familiar,

F = familiar,

P = polite (honor);

H = here,

T = there,

E = elsewhere (proximity),

I = inanimate.

The nominative case is used for pronouns that are the subject of the sentence, such as "I already did that" or "Will you please stop making that noise?"

Personal pronouns (nominative case)
Subject	Proximity	Honor	Singular	Plural
1	N/A	N/A	আমি (ami, I)	আমরা (amra, we)
2	N/A	VF	তুই (tui, you)	তোরা (tora, you)
2	N/A	F	তুমি (tumi, you)	তোমরা (tomra, you)
2	N/A	P	আপনি (apni, you)	আপনারা (apnara, you)
3	H	F	এ (e, he/she)	এরা (era, they)
3	H	P	ইনি (ini, he/she)	এঁরা/এনারা (ẽra/enara, they) (Note: The former is the most common spoken form in West Bengal and the latter in Bangladesh, though the former is the written standard in both Bengals.)
3	H	I	এটা/এটি (eţa/eţi, it) (Note: An alternate form of the -টি (-ţi) suffix is -টা (-ţa)—the former being more formal and the latter more colloquial, with no significant regional variation in this respect. This difference also applies to the suffixes' extended forms, such as those ending in -কে (-ke) or -র (-r).)	এগুলো (egulo, these) (Note: An alternate form of the -গুলো (-gulo) suffix is -গুলা (-gula)—the former is the most common spoken form in West Bengal and the latter in Bangladesh, though the former is the written standard in both Bengals. -গুলি (-guli) is a more formal alternative to both. All three forms can have additional affixes appended to them, such as the case markers -কে (-ke) or -র (-r).)
3	T	F	ও (o, he/she)	ওরা (ora, they)
3	T	P	উনি (uni, he/she)	ওঁরা/ওনারা (õra/onara they)
3	T	I	ওটা/ওটি (oţa/oţi, it)	ওগুলো (ogulo, those)
3	E	F	সে (she, he/she)	তারা (tara, they)
3	E	P	তিনি (tini, he/she)	তাঁরা (tãra, they)
3	E	I	সেটা/সেটি (sheţa/sheţi, it)	সেগুলো (shegulo, those)

The objective case is used for pronouns serving as the direct or indirect objects, such as "I told him to wash the dishes" or "The teacher gave me the homework assignment". The inanimate pronouns remain the same in the objective case.

Personal pronouns (objective case)
Subject	Proximity	Honor	Singular	Plural (Note: In Bangladesh, it is common for all plural pronouns in the objective case to be suffixed with -কে (-ke) to disambiguate them from the otherwise identical plural pronouns of the genitive case, e.g., আমাদেরকে (amaderke) and তোমাদেরকে (tomaderke).)
1	N/A	N/A	আমাকে (amake, to me)	আমাদের (amader, to us)
2	N/A	VF	তোকে (toke, to you)	তোদের (toder, to you)
2	N/A	F	তোমাকে (tomake, to you)	তোমাদের (tomader, to you)
2	N/A	P	আপনাকে (apnake, to you)	আপনাদের (apnader, to you)
3	H	F	একে (eke, to him/her)	এদের (eder, to them)
3	H	P	এঁকে/এনাকে (ẽke/enake, to him/her)	এঁদের/এনাদের (ẽder/enader, them)
3	H	I	এটাকে/এটিকে (eţake/eţike, to it)	এগুলো (egulo, to these)
3	T	F	ওকে (oke, to him/her)	ওদের (oder, to them)
3	T	P	ওঁকে/ওনাকে (õke/onake, to him/her)	ওঁদের/ওনাদের (õder/onader, to them)
3	T	I	ওটাকে/ওটিকে (oţake/oţike, to it)	ওগুলো (ogulo, to those)
3	E	F	তাকে (take, to him/her)	তাদের (tader, to them)
3	E	P	তাঁকে/তেনাকে (tãke/tenake, to him/her)	তাঁদের/তেনাদের (tãder/tenader, to them)
3	E	I	সেটাকে/সেটিকে (sheţake/sheţike, to it)	সেগুলো (shegulo, to those)

The genitive case is used to show possession, such as "Where is your coat?" or "Let's go to our house". In addition, sentences such as "I have a book" (আমার একটি বই আছে) or "I need money" (আমার টাকা দরকার) also use the genitive (the literal translation of the Bengali versions of these sentences would be "There is my book" and "There is my need for money" respectively).

Personal pronouns (genitive case)
Subject	Proximity	Honor	Singular	Plural
1	N/A	N/A	আমার (amar, my/mine)	আমাদের (amader, our)
2	N/A	VF	তোর (tor, your)	তোদের (toder, your)
2	N/A	F	তোমার (tomar, your)	তোমাদের (tomader, your)
2	N/A	P	আপনার (apnar, your)	আপনাদের (apnader, your)
3	H	F	এর (er, his/her)	এদের (eder, their)
3	H	P	এঁর/এনার (ẽr/enar, his/her)	এঁদের/এনাদের (ẽder/enader, their)
3	H	I	এটার/এটির (eţar/eţir, its)	এগুলোর (egulor, of these)
3	T	F	ওর (or, his/her)	ওদের (oder, their)
3	T	P	ওঁর/ওনার (õr/onar, his/her)	ওঁদের/ওনাদের (õder/onader, their)
3	T	I	ওটার/ওটির (oţar/oţir, its)	ওগুলোর (ogulor, of those)
3	E	F	তার (tar, his/her)	তাদের (tader, their)
3	E	P	তাঁর/তেনার (tãr/tenar, his/her)	তাঁদের/তেনাদের (tãder/tenader, their)
3	E	I	সেটার/সেটির (sheţar/sheţir, its)	সেগুলোর (shegulor, of those)

=== Indefinite and negative pronouns ===
Bengali has no negative pronouns (such as no one, nothing, none). These are typically represented by adding the negative particle না (na) to indefinite pronouns, which are themselves derived from their corresponding question words. Common indefinite pronouns are listed below.

Question word	Indefinite pronoun	Indefinite negative pronoun
কে (ke, who)	কেউ (keu, someone)	কেউ না (keu na, no one)
কার (kar, whose)	কারও (karo, someone's)	কারও না (karo na, no one's)
কাকে (kake, to whom)	কাউকে (kauke, to someone)	কাউকে না (kauke na, to no one)
কোন (kon, which)	কোনো (kono, any)	কোনো না (kono na, none)
কি (ki, what)	কিছু (kichu, some/something)	কিছু না (kichu na, nothing)

=== Relative pronouns ===
The relative pronoun যে (je) and its different variants, as shown below, are commonly employed in complex sentences. The relative pronouns for animate objects change for number and honor, but those for inanimate objects can stay the same.

Animacy	Case	Honor	Singular	Plural
Animate	Nominative	F	যে (je)	যারা (jara)
Animate	Nominative	P	যিনি (jini)	যাঁরা (jãra)
Animate	Objective	F	যাকে (jake)	যাদের (jader)
Animate	Objective	P	যাঁকে (jãke)	যাঁদের (jãder)
Animate	Genitive	F	যার (jar)	যাদের (jader)
Animate	Genitive	P	যাঁর (jãr)	যাঁদের (jãder)
Inanimate	Nominative	N/A	যা/যেটা (ja/jeţa)	যা/যেগুলো (ja/jegulo)
Inanimate	Genitive	N/A	যার/যেটার (jar/jeţar)	যার/যেগুলোর (jar/jegulor)
Inanimate	Locative	N/A	যাতে/যেটাতে (jate/jeţate)	যাতে/যেগুলোতে (jate/jegulote)

== Nouns ==
=== Case ===
Nouns are also inflected for case, including nominative, objective (accusative), genitive (possessive), and locative. The marking pattern for each noun being inflected depends on the noun's degree of animacy. The objective case cannot be inflected upon nouns that are inanimate, and the locative case cannot be inflected upon nouns that are animate. When a definite article such as -ţa (টা, for singular nouns) or -gulo (গুলো, for plural nouns) is added, nouns are also inflected for number. In formal contexts, especially in writing, the definite article -ţa is replaced by -ţi (টি). There is also an alternative way of using the plural definite article, -gulo, by making it -guli (গুলি). For animate nouns, -gulo/-guli are often replaced by -ra (রা) Below are two tables that show the inflections of an animate noun, ছাত্র chhatrô (student), and an inanimate noun, জুতা juta (shoe).

Noun inflection
Case	Animacy	Singular	Plural
Nominative	Animate	ছাত্রটি ছাত্রটা chhatrô-ţi chhatrô-ţa the student	ছাত্ররা chhatrô-ra the students
Objective	Animate	ছাত্রটিকে/রে ছাত্রটাকে/রে chhatrô-ţi-ke/re chhatrô-ţa-ke/re (to) the student	ছাত্রদেরকে chhatrô-der-ke (to) the students
Genitive	Animate	ছাত্রটির ছাত্রটার chhatrô-ţi-r chhatrô-ţa-r the student's	ছাত্রদের chhatrô-der the students'
Nominative	Inanimate	জুতাটি জুতাটা juta-ţi juta-ţa the shoe	জুতাগুলো juta-gulo the shoes
Genitive	Inanimate	জুতাটির জুতাটার juta-ţi-r juta-ţa-r the shoe's	জুতাগুলোর juta-gulo-r the shoes'
Locative	Inanimate	জুতাটিতে/ জুতাটায় juta-ţi-te/ juta-ţa-y on/in the shoe	জুতাগুলোতে juta-gulo-te on/in the shoes

All the inflected nouns above have a definite article preceding their case markers. There are some basic rules to keep in mind about the cases, apart from the "default" nominative.

For the objective case, the ending -রে -re is mostly used in Bangladesh both in standard use and across Eastern Bengali dialects. Whilst the ending -কে -ke is mostly used in West Bengal.

For the genitive case, the ending may change, though never with a definite article attached. A noun (without an article) that ends in a consonant or the inherent vowel, অ ô, is inflected by adding – ের -er to the end of the word (and deleting the inherent vowel if applicable). An example of this would be the genitive of মাংস mangshô "meat" being মাংসের mangsher "of meat" or "(the) meat's". A noun that ends in any vowel apart from the inherent vowel will just have a -র -r following it, as in the genitive of ছেলে chhele being ছেলের chheler "(the) boy's". The genitive ending is also applied to verbs (in their verbal noun forms), which is most commonly seen when using postpositions (for example: শেখার জন্য shekhar jonno, "to/for learning").

For the locative case, the marker also changes in a similar fashion to the genitive case, with consonants having their own ending, – ে -e, and all other vowels having another ending, -তে -te, with one exception. If a noun ends with – া -a, then its locative case marker would be -য় -y, as in কলকাতায় Kolkata-y "to Kolkata". However, this exception for -a ending nouns is sometimes ignored, and colloquially many will say কলকাতাতে Kolkata-te instead of the proper Kolkata-y.

=== Measure words ===
When counted, nouns must also be accompanied by the appropriate measure word. As in many East Asian languages (e.g., Chinese, Japanese, Thai, etc.), nouns in Bengali cannot be counted directly by adding the numeral directly adjacent to the noun. The noun's measure word (MW) must be used in between the numeral and the noun. Most nouns take the generic measure word ţa, although there are many more specific measure words, such as jon, which is only used to count humans.

Measure words
Bengali

Nôy-ţa ghoŗi
Nine-MW clock
Nine clocks

Kôy-ţa balish
{How many-MW} pillow
How many pillows

Ônek-jon lok
Many-MW person
Many people

Char-pañch-jon shikkhôk
Four-five-MW teacher
Four or five teachers

Measuring nouns in Bengali without their corresponding measure words (e.g., aţ biŗal instead of aţ-ţa biŗal "eight cats") would typically be considered ungrammatical. However, omitting the noun and preserving the measure word is grammatical and not uncommon to hear. For example, Shudhu êk-jon thakbe. (lit. "Only one-MW will remain.") would be understood to mean "Only one person will remain.", since jon can only be used to count humans. The word lok "person" is implied.

== Adjectives ==
Adjectives do not inflect for case, gender, or number in Bengali and are placed before the noun they modify.

Some adjectives form their opposites by prefixing অ- (before consonants) or অন- (before vowels): for example, the opposite of সম্ভব (sômbhôb, "possible") is অসম্ভব (ôsômbhôb, "impossible").

Demonstrative adjectives – this and that – correspond to এই ei and ওই oi, respectively, with the definite article attached to the following noun. Their plural forms (these/those) remain the same, with the plurality denoted by the definite article or the classifier. Thus, this book would translate to এই বইটি ei boiṭi, while those books would translate to ওই বইগুলো oi boigulo.

=== Comparatives and superlatives ===
Bengali adjectives form their comparative forms with আরও (aro, "more"), and their superlative forms with সবচেয়ে (shôbcheye, "than all"). Comparisons are formed by using the genitive form of the object in comparison, followed by the postposition চেয়ে (cheye, "than") and then by আরও (aro, "more") or একটু কম (ekṭu kôm, "little less"). Sometimes speakers change the postposition following the genitive form of the object of comparison from চেয়ে (cheye, "than") to থেকে (theke, "from"), which is not considered correct by the written standard. The word for "more" is optional, but the word for "less" is required, so in its absence "more" is inferred. Adjectives can be additionally modified by using অনেক (ônek, "much") or অনেক বেশি (ônek beshi, "much more"), which are especially useful for comparing quantities. To refer to two things as being the same, চেয়ে (cheye, "than") is not used after the genitive form of the object. Rather, the postpositions মতো (môto, "like") or সমান (shôman, "equal") are used.

Bengali

সুভাষ {আব্দুর রাহীমের} চেয়ে লম্বা
Shubhash abdur-rahimer ceye lômba
Subhash {Abdur Raheem's} than tall
Subhash is taller than Abdur Raheem

সুভাষ {আব্দুর রাহীমের} চেয়ে আরো লম্বা
Shubhash abdur-rahimer ceye aro lômba
Subhash {Abdur Raheem's} than more tall
Subhash is taller than Abdur Raheem

সুভাষ {আব্দুর রাহীমের} চেয়ে একটু কম লম্বা
Shubhash abdur-rahimer ceye ekṭu kôm lômba
Subhash {Abdur Raheem's} than little less tall
Subhash is less tall than Abdur Raheem

সুভাষ {আব্দুর রাহীমের} সমান লম্বা
Shubhash abdur-rahimer shôman lômba
Subhash {Abdur Raheem's} equal tall
Subhash is as tall as Abdur Raheem

সুভাষ {আব্দুর রাহীমের} চেয়ে অনেক লম্বা
Shubhash abdur-rahimer ceye ônek lômba
Subhash { Abdur Raheem's} than much tall
Subhash is much taller than Abdur Raheem

== Verbs ==
Bengali verbs are highly inflected and are regular with only a few exceptions. They consist of a stem and an ending; they are traditionally listed in Bengali dictionaries in their "verbal noun" form, which is usually formed by adding -a to the stem: for instance, করা (kôra, to do) is formed from the stem কর. The stem can end in either a vowel or a consonant. Verbs are conjugated for tense and person by changing the endings, which are largely the same for all verbs. However, the stem vowel can often change as part of the phenomenon known as "vowel harmony", whereby one vowel can be influenced by other vowels in the word to sound more harmonious. An example would be the verb "to write", with the stem lekh-: লেখো (lekho, you all write) but also লিখি (likhi, we write). In general, the following transformations take place: ô → o, o → u, æ → e, e → i, and a → e (the latter only in the perfect tenses), where the verbal noun features the first vowel but certain conjugations use the second. In addition, the verbs দেওয়া (dêoa, to give) and নেওয়া (nêoa, to take) switch between e, i, a, and æ. If verbs are classified by stem vowel and if the stem ends in a consonant or vowel, there are nine basic classes in which most verbs can be placed; all verbs in a class will follow the same pattern. A prototype verb from each of these classes will be used to demonstrate conjugation for that class; bold will be used to indicate mutation of the stem vowel. Additionally, there are irregular verbs, such as যাওয়া (jaoa, to go), that change the first consonant in their stem in certain conjugations, or such as চাওয়া (chaoa, to want), that add an extra ই -i- to the stem in the future, present progressive, simple past, and past habitual.

Like many other Indo-Aryan languages (such as Hindi or Marathi), nouns can be turned into verbs by combining them with select auxiliary verbs. In Bengali, the most common such auxiliary verb is করা (kôra, to do); thus, verbs such as to joke are formed by combining the noun form of joke (রসিকতা roshikôta) with to do (করা kôra) to create রসিকতা করা roshikôta kôra. When conjugating such verbs, the noun part of such a verb is left untouched, so in the previous example, only করা kôra would be inflected or conjugated (e.g., "I will make a joke" becomes আমি রসিকতা করব roshikôta korbo; see more on tenses below). Other auxiliary verbs include দেওয়া and নেওয়া, but the verb করা enjoys significant usage because it can be combined with foreign verbs to form a native version of the verb, even if a direct translation exists. Most often this is done with English verbs: for example, "to vote" is often referred to as ভোট দেওয়া (bhoṭ dêoa, where bhoṭ is the transliteration of "vote").

=== Copula ===
Bengali is considered a zero copula language in some aspects.

- In the simple present tense, there is no verb connecting the subject to the predicative (the "zero-verb" copula). There is one notable exception, however, which is when the predicative takes on the existential, locative, or genitive aspects; for such purposes, the incomplete verb আছ- (ach-) is used, which is conjugated according to the rules given below. Whereas the verb হওয়া (hôwa) means "to be", the verb আছ- ach- can be roughly translated as "to exist" or "to be present".
- In the past tense, the incomplete verb আছ- ach- is always used as the copula, regardless of the nature of the predicative.
- For the future tense and non-finite structures, the copula is supplied by the verb হওয়া (hôwa), with the exceptions being the genitive and locative predicatives for which the verb থাকা (thaka, "to remain") is utilized.
- Possession: Bengali does not have a verb for possession (i.e., "to have", "to own"). Instead of the sentence "You have a book", possession in Bengali is expressed by the verb আছ- ach- (for present and past tenses) and the verb থাকা thaka (for future tense) inflected with the possessed object ("book") and a genitive (genitive) case for the possessor (i.e., তুমি tumi, "you" → তোমার tomar, "your"). For example: তোমার একটা বই আছে (Tomar êkṭa boi ache, "You have a book"; Literally: "Your one book exists").

The following table demonstrates the rules above with some examples.

English	Bengali	Notes
Simple assertive
I am happy	আমি সুখী Ami shukhi	Simple present: No verb used to denote the copula
I was happy	আমি সুখী ছিলাম Ami shukhi chilam	Simple Past: আছ- is used as the copula (with past inflection)
I will be happy	আমি সুখী হব Ami shukhi hôbo	Simple future: হওয়া is used as the copula
Locative aspect
I am at home	আমি বাড়িতে আছি Ami baṛite achi	Present: আছ- is used to connect to a locative predicative
I was at home	আমি বাড়িতে ছিলাম Ami baṛite chilam	Past: আছ- is used
I will be at home	আমি বাড়িতে থাকব Ami baṛite thakbo	Future: থাকা is used
Genitive aspect
I have a book	আমার একটা বই আছে Amar êkṭa boi ache	Present: আছ- is used to connect to a genitive predicative
I had a book	আমার একটা বই ছিল Amar êkṭa boi chilo	Past: আছ- is used
I will have a book	আমার একটা বই থাকবে Amar êkṭa boi thakbe	Future: থাকা is used
Existential aspect
There is time	সময় আছে Shômôy ache	Present: আছ- is used to connect to an existential predicative
There was time	সময় ছিল Shômôy chilo	Past: আছ- is used
There will be time	সময় থাকবে Shômôy thakbe	Future: থাকা is used

=== Negation ===
There are four sentence negators employed in Bengali:

- The zero verb copula is negated using the incomplete negator ন-, which is conjugated as নই (1), নও (2F), নন (2P), নয় (3).
- Existential sentences that use the verb আছ- are negated with নেই (nei), which does not need to be conjugated.
- All other verbs (with the exceptions of the ones listed above) are negated using the universal negative particle না (na), which can also refer to "no" in yes–no questions. না is typically placed after the finite verb (see examples below), but can also be placed at the end of the sentence, which negates the whole sentence. না can be used in all tenses except two: the present perfect and the past perfect.
- Verbs in the present perfect and the past perfect tenses are negated using the suffix -নি (ni) attached to the simple present verb form; this naturally means that in negative sentences the distinction between the two tenses is lost, since they both use the same verb form.

Negating verbs
English	Bengali	Notes
I am not happy	আমি সুখী নই Ami shukhi noi	Incomplete negator ন- nô- conjugated for first-person
We don't have a car	আমাদের গাড়ি নেই Amader gaṛi nei	নেই nei used to negate আছ-, which is completely replaced
I don't work	আমি কাজ করি না Ami kaj kori na	না na is used to negate all other finite verbs
I didn't help him	আমি তাকে সাহায্য করিনি Ami take sahajjo korini	The suffix -নি -ni is attached to the simple present form of করা to negate the past perfect form

=== Person ===
Verbs are inflected for person and honour, but not for number. There are five forms: first person, second person (very familiar), second person (familiar), third person (familiar), and second/third person (polite). The same sample subject pronouns will be used for all the example conjugation paradigms: ami (Bengali: আমি), tui (তুই), tumi (তুমি), she (সে) and apni (আপনি). These have the following plurals, respectively: amra (আমরা), tora (তোরা), tomra (তোমরা), tara (তারা) and apnara (আপনারা).

=== Mood ===
There are two moods for Bengali verbs: the indicative and the imperative. The indicative mood is used for statements of fact; its various tenses are given below.

The imperative mood is used to give commands. Just as in other Indo-Aryan languages, the imperative form of a verb differs on the basis of honorifics. The three sets of second-person pronouns – তুই/তোরা (2 (VF)), তুমি/তোমরা (2 (F)), আপনি/আপনারা (2/3 (P)) – combined with slight modifications to the stem of any verb form the imperatives for that verb; these are described in the table below. Bengali also has a 3rd person imperative, using the pronouns সে/তারা (3 (F)). Note that the plural command forms change the pronoun but not the verb ending. The 2nd person familiar and very familiar don't take stem transformations, while the others do.

Imperative mood
Verb	2 (VF)	2 (F)	3 (F)	2/3 (P)
বলা bôla	তুই বল্ tui bôl	তুমি বল tumi bôlo	সে বলুক she boluk	আপনি বলুন apni bolun
খোলা khola	তুই খোল্ tui khol	তুমি খোল tumi kholo	সে খুলুক she khuluk	আপনি খুলুন apni khulun
খেলা khêla	তুই খেল্ tui khêl	তুমি খেল tumi khêlo	সে খেলুক she kheluk	আপনি খেলুন apni khelun
চেনা chena	তুই চেন্ tui chen	তুমি চেন tumi cheno	সে চিনুক she chinuk	আপনি চিনুন apni chinun
জানা jana	তুই জান্ tui jan	তুমি জান tumi jano	সে জানুক she januk	আপনি জানুন apni janun
হওয়া hôoa	তুই হ tui hô	তুমি হও tumi hôo	সে হোক she hok	আপনি হোন apni hon
ধোয়া dhoa	তুই ধো tui dho	তুমি ধোও tumi dhoo	সে ধুক she dhuk	আপনি ধুন apni dhun
খাওয়া khaoa	তুই খা tui kha	তুমি খাও tumi khao	সে খাক she khak	আপনি খান apni khan
দেওয়া deoa	তুই দে tui de	তুমি দাও tumi dao	সে দিক she dik	আপনি দিন apni din

Bangla also has a future imperative. In the second person familiar, this is formed by changing the vowel in the present imperative. In the second person very familiar, it's the same as the simple present form for that person. For the rest of the persons, the future imperative is the same as the future.

=== Non-finite forms ===
- আঁকা ãka – verbal noun ("act of drawing")
- আঁকতে ãkte – verbal infinitive ("to draw")
- আঁকতে-আঁকতে ãkte-ãkte – progressive participle ("while drawing")
- আঁকলে ãkle – conditional participle ("if X draws/drew/had drawn")
- এঁকে ẽke – perfect participle ("having drawn")
- এঁকে-এঁকে ẽke-ẽke – iterative participle ("having drawn many times/for a long time")

For non-causative verbs (see more on causative verbs below), the verbal infinitive and perfect participle forms require stem transformations according to the principles of vowel harmony. Causative verbs only require stem transformations for forming their perfect participles.

The verbal noun can act like a regular noun, and can therefore take case-endings and classifier particles; additionally, it can also function as an adjective. Both the verbal noun and the verbal infinitive are often used in constructions where the infinitive is needed.

The perfect participle can be combined with some verbs to denote a slight change in meaning for the first verb (as opposed to two verbs.) For example, (এটা) করে দাও (kore dao, 'do it (for us)'), করে নাও (kore nao, 'do it (for yourself)'), করে ফেল (kore phêlo, 'do it (with an emphasis on getting it done)'), etc. Many of these are similar to the light verbs used in other Indo-Aryan languages, though formed slightly differently.

==== Impersonal structures ====
Many common sentence constructions, such as those involving obligation, need, and possibility ("I have to", "We must", "He is supposed to", etc.), are built in Bengali without using nominative subjects; instead, the subject is omitted, or often put into the genitive case. These are typically constructed using the verbal noun (or the verbal infinitive in some cases) along with other nouns or verbs.

- Obligation is expressed using the verbal infinitive and a third-person form of হওয়া (in any tense, but the present tense also uses the future tense conjugation), with the subject in the objective case. For example: আমাকে খেতে হবে ("I have to eat"; হবে is the future tense conjugation for হওয়া).
- Need is expressed by using the verbal noun with the noun দরকার (dôrkar, need), and the subject in the genitive. For example: আমার কথা বলা দরকার ("I need to talk").
- Constructions involving "should", "ought to", or "must" are constructed with the verbal noun and the adjective উচিত (uchit, appropriate), and the subject in the genitive. For example: আমাদের যাওয়া উচিত ("We ought to go").

=== Passive ===
Any active verb can be turned into a passive one by attaching the auxiliary হওয়া to the verbal noun aspect of the verb in question. Only this suffix is conjugated, using the third-person endings for the various tenses. For example: "to eat" is খাওয়া, so "to be eaten" becomes খাওয়া হওয়া; in the future tense, "will be eaten" would be খাওয়া হবে, where হবে is the third-person conjugation for হওয়া in the future tense (more information on tenses below).

=== Causative ===
Most verbs (not all verbs have causative forms) can be made causative by adding the suffix -ন/নো to it. For example: "to do" is করা, which takes the -নো suffix to become করানো, or "to cause to do". The stem of such a causative verb – to be used when conjugating it – is thus the verbal noun form of the base verb (করা in the case of করানো). For the most part, such stems do not undergo any vowel transformations when conjugating for tenses. However, in the perfective participle (and thus, the perfect tenses), the -a at the end of the base gets removed, the -iye suffix is added, and the stem vowel changes, while the second person familiar future imperative is the same but with an -iyo and not an -iye.

=== Tense ===
Bengali has four simple tenses: the present tense, the past tense, the conditional or habitual past tense, and the future tense. These combine with mood and aspect to form more complex conjugations: the perfect tenses, for example, are formed by combining the perfect participles with the corresponding tense endings.

==== Aspect ====
There are three aspects for Bengali verbs: simple aspect, the progressive/continuous aspect, and the perfect. The progressive aspect is denoted by adding the prefix to the regular tense endings with ছ (for stems ending with consonants) or চ্ছ (for stems ending with vowels), while the perfect aspect requires the use of the perfect participle. These are combined with the different tenses described below to form the various verbal conjugations possible.

==== Simple present tense ====
The present tense in Bengali is similar to that of English: I eat, you run, he reads. The endings are -i, -(i)sh, -o, -e, and -(e)n, and only the 1st-person and the VF forms require stem transformations for vowel harmony.

Verb	1	2 (VF)	2 (F)	3 (F)	2/3 (P)
bôla	ami boli	tui bolish	tumi bôlo	she bôle	apni bôlen
বলা	আমি বলি	তুই বলিস	তুমি বল	সে বলে	আপনি বলেন
khola	ami khuli	tui khulish	tumi kholo	she khole	apni kholen
খোলা	আমি খুলি	তুই খুলিস	তুমি খোল	সে খোলে	আপনি খোলেন
khêla	ami kheli	tui khelish	tumi khêlo	she khêle	apni khêlen
খেলা	আমি খেলি	তুই খেলিস	তুমি খেল	সে খেলে	আপনি খেলেন
chena	ami chini	tui chinish	tumi cheno	she chene	apni chenen
চেনা	আমি চিনি	তুই চিনিস	তুমি চেন	সে চেনে	আপনি চেনেন
jana	ami jani	tui janish	tumi jano	she jane	apni janen
জানা	আমি জানি	তুই জানিস	তুমি জান	সে জানে	আপনি জানেন
hôoa	ami hoi	tui hosh	tumi hôo	she hôe	apni hôn
হওয়া	আমি হই	তুই হোস	তুমি হও	সে হয়	আপনি হন
dhoa	ami dhui	tui dhush	tumi dhoo	she dhoe	apni dhon
ধোয়া	আমি ধুই	তুই ধুস	তুমি ধোও	সে ধোয়	আপনি ধোন
khaoa	ami khai	tui khash	tumi khao	she khae	apni khan
খাওয়া	আমি খাই	তুই খাস	তুমি খাও	সে খায়	আপনি খান
deoa	ami dii	tui dish	tumi dao	she dêe	apni dên
দেওয়া	আমি দিই	তুই দিস	তুমি দাও	সে দেয়	আপনি দেন

==== Present progressive tense ====
The present progressive tense is also similar to that of English: I am eating, you are running, he is reading, etc. This tense is formed by combining the progressive aspect suffix (ছ/চ্ছ) with the present tense endings; we thus get -chhi, -chhish, -chho, -chhe and -chhen, and all forms require stem transformations for vowel harmony.

Verb	1	2 (VF)	2 (F)	3 (F)	2/3 (P)
bôla	ami bolchhi	tui bolchish	tumi bolchho	she bolchhe	apni bolchhen
বলা	আমি বলছি	তুই বলছিস	তুমি বলছ	সে বলছে	আপনি বলছেন
khola	ami khulchhi	tui khulchhish	tumi khulchho	she khulchhe	apni khulchhen
খোলা	আমি খুলছি	তুই খুলছিস	তুমি খুলছ	সে খুলছে	আপনি খুলছেন
khêla	ami khelchhi	tui khelchhish	tumi khelchho	she khelchhe	apni khelchhen
খেলা	আমি খেলছি	তুই খেলছিস	তুমি খেলছ	সে খেলছে	আপনি খেলছেন
chena	ami chinchhi	tui chinchhish	tumi chinchho	she chinchhe	apni chinchhen
চেনা	আমি চিনছি	তুই চিনছিস	তুমি চিনছ	সে চিনছে	আপনি চিনছেন
jana	ami janchhi	tui janchhish	tumi janchho	she janchhe	apni janchhen
জানা	আমি জানছি	তুই জানছিস	তুমি জানছ	সে জানছে	আপনি জানছেন
hôoa	ami hochhi	tui hochhish	tumi hochho	she hochhe	apni hochhen
হওয়া	আমি হচ্ছি	তুই হচ্ছিস	তুমি হচ্ছ	সে হচ্ছে	আপনি হচ্ছেন
dhoa	ami dhuchhi	tui dhuchhish	tumi dhuchho	she dhuchhe	apni dhuchhen
ধোয়া	আমি ধুচ্ছি	তুই ধুচ্ছিস	তুমি ধুচ্ছ	সে ধুচ্ছে	আপনি ধুচ্ছেন
khaoa	ami khachhi	tui khachhish	tumi khachho	she khachhe	apni khachhen
খাওয়া	আমি খাচ্ছি	তুই খাচ্ছিস	তুমি খাচ্ছ	সে খাচ্ছে	আপনি খাচ্ছেন
deoa	ami dichhi	tui dichhish	tumi dichho	she dichhe	apni dichhen
দেওয়া	আমি দিচ্ছি	তুই দিচ্ছিস	তুমি দিচ্ছ	সে দিচ্ছে	আপনি দিচ্ছেন

==== Present perfect tense ====
The present perfect tense is used to relate events that happened fairly recently, or even past events whose effects are still felt in the present. It is formed by adding the present progressive tense suffixes (see above) with the perfect participle of the verb.

Verb	1	2 (VF)	2 (F)	3 (F)	2/3 (P)
bôla	ami bolechhi	tui bolechhish	tumi bolechho	she bolechhe	apni bolechhen
বলা	আমি বলেছি	তুই বলেছিস	তুমি বলেছ	সে বলেছে	আপনি বলেছেন
khola	ami khulechhi	tui khulechhish	tumi khulechho	she khulechhe	apni khulechhen
খোলা	আমি খুলেছি	তুই খুলেছিস	তুমি খুলেছ	সে খুলেছে	আপনি খুলেছেন
khêla	ami khelechhi	tui khelechhish	tumi khelechho	she khelechhe	apni khelechhen
খেলা	আমি খেলেছি	তুই খেলেছিস	তুমি খেলেছ	সে খেলেছে	আপনি খেলেছেন
chena	ami chinechhi	tui chinechhish	tumi chinechho	she chinechhe	apni chinechhen
চেনা	আমি চিনেছি	তুই চিনেছিস	তুমি চিনেছ	সে চিনেছে	আপনি চিনেছেন
jana	ami jenechhi	tui jenechhish	tumi jenechho	she jenechhe	apni jenechhen
জানা	আমি জেনেছি	তুই জেনেছিস	তুমি জেনেছ	সে জেনেছে	আপনি জেনেছেন
hôoa	ami hoyechhi	tui hoyechhish	tumi hoyechho	she hoyechhe	apni hoyechhen
হওয়া	আমি হয়েছি	তুই হয়েছিস	তুমি হয়েছ	সে হয়েছে	আপনি হয়েছেন
dhoa	ami dhuyechhi	tui dhuyechhish	tumi dhuyechho	she dhuyechhe	apni dhuyechhen
ধোয়া	আমি ধুয়েছি	তুই ধুয়েছিস	তুমি ধুয়েছ	সে ধুয়েছে	আপনি ধুয়েছেন
khaoa	ami kheyechhi	tui kheyechhish	tumi kheyechho	she kheyechhe	apni kheyechhen
খাওয়া	আমি খেয়েছি	তুই খেয়েছিস	তুমি খেয়েছ	সে খেয়েছে	আপনি খেয়েছেন
deoa	ami diyechhi	tui diyechhish	tumi diyechho	she diyechhe	apni diyechhen
দেওয়া	আমি দিয়েছি	তুই দিয়েছিস	তুমি দিয়েছ	সে দিয়েছে	আপনি দিয়েছেন

==== Simple past tense ====
The (simple) past tense differs from its use in English in that it is usually reserved for events that have occurred recently; for instance, less than a day ago. It would be translated into the English simple past tense: I ate, you ran, he read. The endings are -lam, -li, -le, -lo, -len (notice that the vowels for the second and third [familiar] persons are the reverse of those in the present tense), and all forms require stem transformations for vowel harmony. For example: ami dekhlam, tui dekhli, tumi dekhle, se dekhlo, apni dekhlen. In non-rarhi varieties of Bengali, that is to say, northern and eastern dialects, "a" is substituted for "e" in second-person familiar forms; thus, tumi bolla, khulla, khella, etc., which is the original inflection, the "e" in contrast is a vowel-harmonised variant of the former, having gone through a process called abhisruti.

Verb	1	2 (VF)	2 (F)	3 (F)	2/3 (P)
bôla	ami bollam	tui bolli	tumi bolle	she bollo	apni bollen
বলা	আমি বললাম	তুই বললি	তুমি বললে	সে বলল	আপনি বললেন
khola	ami khullam	tui khulli	tumi khulle	she khullo	apni khullen
খোলা	আমি খুললাম	তুই খুললি	তুমি খুললে	সে খুলল	আপনি খুললেন
khêla	ami khellam	tui khelli	tumi khelle	she khello	apni khellen
খেলে	আমি খেললাম	তুই খেললি	তুমি খেললে	সে খেলল	আপনি খেললেন
chena	ami chinlam	tui chinli	tumi chinle	she chinlo	apni chinlen
চেনা	আমি চিনলাম	তুই চিনলি	তুমি চিনলে	সে চিনল	আপনি চিনলেন
jana	ami janlam	tui janli	tumi janle	she janlo	apni janlen
জানা	আমি জানলাম	তুই জানলি	তুমি জানলে	সে জানল	আপনি জানলেন
hôoa	ami holam	tui holi	tumi hole	she holo	apni holen
হওয়া	আমি হলাম	তুই হলি	তুমি হলে	সে হল	আপনি হলেন
dhooa	ami dhulam	tui dhuli	tumi dhule	she dhulo	apni dhulen
ধোওয়া	আমি ধুলাম	তুই ধুলি	তুমি ধুলে	সে ধুল	আপনি ধুলেন
khaoa	ami khelam	tui kheli	tumi khele	she khelo	apni khelen
খাওয়া	আমি খেলাম	তুই খেলি	তুমি খেলে	সে খেল	আপনি খেলেন
dêoa	ami dilam	tui dili	tumi dile	she dilo	apni dilen
দেওয়া	আমি দিলাম	তুই দিলি	তুমি দিলে	সে দিল	আপনি দিলেন

==== Past progressive tense ====
The past progressive tense is similar to that of English: I was eating, you were running, he was reading, etc. This tense is formed by combining the progressive aspect suffix (ছ/চ্ছ) with the past tense endings, but with an extra -i- inserted in between; we thus get -chhilam, -chhili, -chhile, -chhilo and -chhilen, and all forms require stem transformations for vowel harmony.

Verb	1	2 (VF)	2 (F)	3 (F)	2/3 (P)
bôla	ami bolchhilam	tui bolchili	tumi bolchhile	she bolchhilo	apni bolchhilen
বলা	আমি বলছিলাম	তুই বলছিলি	তুমি বলছিলে	সে বলছিল	আপনি বলছিলেন
khola	ami khulchhilam	tui khulchhili	tumi khulchhile	she khulchhilo	apni khulchhilen
খোলা	আমি খুলছিলাম	তুই খুলছিলি	তুমি খুলছিলে	সে খুলছিল	আপনি খুলছিলেন
khêla	ami khelchhilam	tui khelchhili	tumi khelchhile	she khelchhilo	apni khelchhilen
খেলা	আমি খেলছিলাম	তুই খেলছিলি	তুমি খেলছিলে	সে খেলছিল	আপনি খেলছিলেন
chena	ami chinchhilam	tui chinchhili	tumi chinchhile	she chinchhilo	apni chinchhilen
চেনা	আমি চিনছিলাম	তুই চিনছিলি	তুমি চিনছিলে	সে চিনছিল	আপনি চিনছিলেন
jana	ami janchhilam	tui janchhili	tumi janchhile	she janchhilo	apni janchhilen
জানা	আমি জানছিলাম	তুই জানছিলি	তুমি জানছিলে	সে জানছিল	আপনি জানছিলেন
hôoa	ami hochhilam	tui hochhili	tumi hochhile	she hochhilo	apni hochhilen
হওয়া	আমি হচ্ছিলাম	তুই হচ্ছিলি	তুমি হচ্ছিলে	সে হচ্ছিল	আপনি হচ্ছিলেন
dhoa	ami dhuchhilam	tui dhuchhili	tumi dhuchhile	she dhuchhilo	apni dhuchhilen
ধোয়া	আমি ধুচ্ছিলাম	তুই ধুচ্ছিলি	তুমি ধুচ্ছিলে	সে ধুচ্ছিল	আপনি ধুচ্ছিলেন
khaoa	ami khachhilam	tui khachhili	tumi khachhile	she khachhilo	apni khachhilen
খাওয়া	আমি খাচ্ছিলাম	তুই খাচ্ছিলি	তুমি খাচ্ছিলে	সে খাচ্ছিল	আপনি খাচ্ছিলেন
deoa	ami dichhilam	tui dichhili	tumi dichhile	she dichhilo	apni dichhilen
দেওয়া	আমি দিচ্ছিলাম	তুই দিচ্ছিলি	তুমি দিচ্ছিলে	সে দিচ্ছিল	আপনি দিচ্ছিলেন

==== Past perfect tense ====
The past perfect tense differs from its usage in English. It's usually used for events that didn't happen recently; over a day ago, for instance, unlike Bangla's simple past (see above). It would usually be translated with English's simple past: I ate, you ran, he read, etc., but it can also be translated with English's past perfect tense: I had eaten, you had run, he had read, etc. It's formed by adding the past progressive tense suffixes (see above) to the perfect participle of the verb.

Verb	1	2 (VF)	2 (F)	3 (F)	2/3 (P)
bôla	ami bolechhilam	tui bolechhili	tumi bolechhile	she bolechhilo	apni bolechhilen
বলা	আমি বলেছিলাম	তুই বলেছিলি	তুমি বলেছিলে	সে বলেছিল	আপনি বলেছিলেন
khola	ami khulechhilam	tui khulechhili	tumi khulechhile	she khulechhilo	apni khulechhilen
খোলা	আমি খুলেছিলাম	তুই খুলেছিলি	তুমি খুলেছিলে	সে খুলেছিল	আপনি খুলেছিলেন
khêla	ami khelechhilam	tui khelechhili	tumi khelechhile	she khelechhilo	apni khelechhilen
খেলা	আমি খেলেছিলাম	তুই খেলেছিলি	তুমি খেলেছিলে	সে খেলেছিল	আপনি খেলেছিলেন
chena	ami chinechhilam	tui chinechhili	tumi chinechhile	she chinechhilo	apni chinechhilen
চেনা	আমি চিনেছিলাম	তুই চিনেছিলি	তুমি চিনেছিলে	সে চিনেছিল	আপনি চিনেছিলেন
jana	ami jenechhilam	tui jenechhili	tumi jenechhile	she jenechhilo	apni jenechhilen
জানা	আমি জেনেছিলাম	তুই জেনেছিলি	তুমি জেনেছিলে	সে জেনেছিল	আপনি জেনেছিলেন
hôoa	ami hoyechhilam	tui hoyechhili	tumi hoyechhile	she hoyechhilo	apni hoyechhilen
হওয়া	আমি হয়েছিলাম	তুই হয়েছিলি	তুমি হয়েছিলে	সে হয়েছিল	আপনি হয়েছিলেন
dhoa	ami dhuyechhilam	tui dhuyechhili	tumi dhuyechhile	she dhuyechhilo	apni dhuyechhilen
ধোয়া	আমি ধুয়েছিলাম	তুই ধুয়েছিলি	তুমি ধুয়েছিলে	সে ধুয়েছিল	আপনি ধুয়েছিলেন
khaoa	ami kheyechhilam	tui kheyechhili	tumi kheyechhile	she kheyechhilo	apni kheyechhilen
খাওয়া	আমি খেয়েছিলাম	তুই খেয়েছিলি	তুমি খেয়েছিলে	সে খেয়েছিল	আপনি খেয়েছিলেন
deoa	ami diyechhilam	tui diyechhili	tumi diyechhile	she diyechhilo	apni diyechhilen
দেওয়া	আমি দিয়েছিলাম	তুই দিয়েছিলি	তুমি দিয়েছিলে	সে দিয়েছিল	আপনি দিয়েছিলেন

==== Habitual past tense ====
The habitual past tense has a few different uses. It is used for events that happened regularly, such as "I used to eat out every day" or "He wrote poems when he was young", the equivalent of an imperfect. It may also be used as a sort of conditional, such as the following: "If you asked I would come" or "If you had asked I would have come" (তুমি যদি বলতে আমি আসতাম tumi jodi bolte ami ashtam). It is easy to form the habitual past tense: simply start with the simple past tense and change the l to t (except in the tui [2 VF] form). The endings are -tam, -tish, -te, -to, -ten, and all forms require stem transformations for vowel harmony. For example: ami dekhtam, tui dekhtish, tumi dekhte, she dekhto, apni dekhten. In less standard varieties of Bengali, "a" is substituted for "e" in second-person familiar forms; thus, tumi bolta, khulta, khelta, etc.

Verb	1	2 (VF)	2 (F)	3 (F)	2/3 (P)
bôla	ami boltam	tui boltish	tumi bolte	she bolto	apni bolten
বলা	আমি বলতাম	তুই বলতিস	তুমি বলতে	সে বলত	আপনি বলতেন
khola	ami khultam	tui khultish	tumi khulte	she khulto	apni khulten
খোলা	আমি খুলতাম	তুই খুলতিস	তুমি খুলতে	সে খুলত	আপনি খুলতেন
khêla	ami kheltam	tui kheltish	tumi khelte	she khelto	apni khelten
খেলে	আমি খেলতাম	তুই খেলতিস	তুমি খেলতে	সে খেলত	আপনি খেলতেন
chena	ami chintam	tui chintish	tumi chinte	she chinto	apni chinten
চেনা	আমি চিনতাম	তুই চিনতিস	তুমি চিনতে	সে চিনত	আপনি চিনতেন
jana	ami jantam	tui jantish	tumi jante	she janto	apni janten
জানা	আমি জানতাম	তুই জানতিস	তুমি জানতে	সে জানত	আপনি জানতেন
hôoa	ami hotam	tui hotish	tumi hote	she hoto	apni hoten
হওয়া	আমি হতাম	তুই হতিস	তুমি হতে	সে হত	আপনি হতেন
dhooa	ami dhutam	tui dhutish	tumi dhute	she dhuto	apni dhuten
ধোওয়া	আমি ধুতাম	তুই ধুতিস	তুমি ধুতে	সে ধুত	আপনি ধুতেন
khaoa	ami khetam	tui kheltish	tumi khete	she kheto	apni kheten
খাওয়া	আমি খেতাম	তুই খেতিস	তুমি খেতে	সে খেত	আপনি খেতেন
dêoa	ami ditam	tui ditish	tumi dite	she dito	apni diten
দেওয়া	আমি দিতাম	তুই দিতিস	তুমি দিতে	সে দিত	আপনি দিতেন

==== Future tense ====
In less standard varieties of Bengali, "a" is substituted for "e" in second-person familiar forms; thus, tumi bolba, khulba, khelba, etc. The endings are -bo, -bi, -be, -be, -ben; the তুমি and সে conjugations are identical in this tense. Forms ending in a consonant do require stem transformations for vowel harmony, but ones ending in a vowel don't.

Verb	1	2 (VF)	2 (F)	3 (F)	2/3 (P)
bôla	ami bolbo	tui bolbi	tumi bolbe	she bolbe	apni bolben
বলা	আমি বলব	তুই বলবি	তুমি বলবে	সে বলবে	আপনি বলবেন
khola	ami khulbo	tui khulbi	tumi khulbe	she khulbe	apni khulben
খোলা	আমি খুলব	তুই খুলবি	তুমি খুলবে	সে খুলবে	আপনি খুলবেন
khêla	ami khelbo	tui khelbi	tumi khelbe	she khelbe	apni khelben
খেলে	আমি খেলব	তুই খেলবি	তুমি খেলবে	সে খেলবে	আপনি খেলবেন
chena	ami chinbo	tui chinbi	tumi chinbe	she chinbe	apni chinben
চেনা	আমি চিনব	তুই চিনবি	তুমি চিনবে	সে চিনবে	আপনি চিনবেন
jana	ami janbo	tui janbi	tumi janbe	she janbe	apni janben
জানা	আমি জানব	তুই জানবি	তুমি জানবে	সে জানবে	আপনি জানবেন
hôoa	ami hôbo	tui hôbi	tumi hôbe	she hôbe	apni hôben
হওয়া	আমি হব	তুই হবি	তুমি হবে	সে হবে	আপনি হবেন
dhooa	ami dhobo	tui dhobi	tumi dhobe	she dhobe	apni dhoben
ধোওয়া	আমি ধোব	তুই ধোবি	তুমি ধোবে	সে ধোবে	আপনি ধোবেন
khaoa	ami khabo	tui khabi	tumi khabe	she khabe	apni khaben
খাওয়া	আমি খাব	তুই খাবি	তুমি খাবে	সে খাবে	আপনি খাবেন
dêoa	ami debo	tui debi	tumi debe	she debe	apni deben
দেওয়া	আমি দেব	তুই দিবি	তুমি দেবে	সে দেবে	আপনি দেবেন

== Prepositions and postpositions ==
Whereas English features prepositions, Bengali typically uses postpositions. That is, while these modifying words occur before their object in English (beside him, inside the house), they typically occur after their object in Bengali (or pashe, baŗir bhitore). Some postpositions require their object noun to take the genitive case, while others require the objective case (which is unmarked for inanimate nouns); this distinction must be memorised. Most postpositions are formed by taking nouns referring to a location and inflecting them for the locative case. They can also be applied to verbal nouns.

=== Postpositions that require genitive case ===
- আগে aage 'before': সকালের আগে shôkal-er age 'before the morning'
- পরে pôre 'after': সন্ধ্যার পরে shondha-r pôre 'after the evening'
- উপরে upore 'on top of', 'above': বিছানার উপরে bichhana-r upore 'on top of the bed'
- নিচে niche 'below', 'under': বইয়ের নিচে boi-er niche 'under the book'
- পিছনে pichhone 'behind': আলমারির পিছনে almari-r pichhone 'behind the cupboard'
- সামনে shamne 'in front of': গাড়ির সামনে gaŗi-r shamne 'in front of the car'
- ওই পারে oi pare 'across': নদীর ওই পারে nodi-r oi pare 'across the river'
- কাছে kachhe 'near': জানালার কাছে janala-r kachhe 'near the window'
- পাশে pashe 'beside': চুলার পাশে chula-r pashe 'beside the stove'
- জন্য jonno 'for': শিক্ষকের জন্য shikkhôk-er jonno 'for the teacher'
- কাছ থেকে kachh theke 'from' (people): বাবার কাছ থেকে baba-r kachh theke 'from father'
- দিকে dike 'towards': বাসার দিকে basha-r dike 'towards the house'
- বাইরে baire 'outside': দেশের বাইরে desh-er baire 'outside the country'
- ভিতরে bhitore 'inside': দোকানের ভিতরে dokan-er bhitore 'inside the store'
- মধ্যে moddhe 'in the middle of': সমুদ্রের মধ্যে shomudr-er moddhe 'in the middle of the ocean'
- ভিতর দিয়ে bhitor die 'through': শহরের ভিতর দিয়ে shôhorer bhitor die 'through the city'
- মতো môto 'like': তোমার মতো tom-ar môto 'like you'
- সঙ্গে shôngge 'with': আমার সঙ্গে am-ar shôngge 'with me'
- কথা kôtha 'about': সেটার কথা sheţa-r kôtha 'about that'
- সম্মন্ধে shômmondhe 'about': ইতিহাসের সম্মন্ধে itihash-er shômmondhe 'about history'
- সাথে shathe 'with' (animate): মায়ের সাথে' ma-er 'shathe 'with Mother'

=== Postpositions that require objective case ===
- করে kore 'by means of': ট্যাক্সিকরে' ţêksi kore 'by taxi'
- ছাড়া chhaŗa 'without', 'aside from': আমাকে ছাড়া ama-ke chhaŗa 'aside from me'
- থেকে theke 'from' (places): বাংলাদেশ থেকে Bangladesh theke 'from Bangladesh'
- দিয়ে diye 'by': তাকে দিয়ে ta-ke diye 'by him'
- নিয়ে niye 'about' (animate), 'with' (animate): তোমাকে নিয়ে toma-ke niye 'about/with you'
- পর্যন্ত porjonto 'until': দশটা পর্যন্ত dôshţa porjonto 'until ten o' clock'
- সহ shôho 'with', 'including': টাকা সহ ţaka shôho 'along with the money'
- হয়ে hoe 'via': কলকাতা হয়ে Kolkata hoe 'via Kolkata'

=== Postpositions that require nominative case ===
- ধরে dhore 'for' (time): দুদিন ধরে dudin dhore 'for two days'
- নিয়ে niye 'about' (inanimate), 'with' (inanimate): 'তা নিয়ে' ta niye 'about/with it'

=== Prepositions that require locative case ===
- বিনা bina 'without': বিনা অনুমতিতে bina onumoti-te 'without permission'
