= Hindustani verbs =

Verbs in the Hindi and Urdu languages

Hindustani (Hindi and Urdu) verbs conjugate according to mood, tense, person, number, and gender. Hindustani inflection is markedly simpler in comparison to Sanskrit, from which Hindustani has inherited its verbal conjugation system (through Prakrit). Aspect-marking participles in Hindustani mark the aspect. Gender is not distinct in the present tense of the indicative mood, but all the participle forms agree with the gender and number of the subject. Verbs agree with the gender of the subject or the object depending on whether the subject pronoun is in the dative or ergative case (agrees with the object) or the nominative case (agrees with the subject).

== Overview ==
=== Verbs ===
In Hindustani, all verbs have a base form called the infinitive which is marked by the -nā ending of verbs (compare Proto-Germanic *-aną). Some of the most common verbs are: honā (to be), karnā (to do), rahnā (to stay), chalnā (to walk), bolnā (to speak).

=== Complex verbs ===
Hindustani is extremely rich in complex verbs formed by the combinations of noun/adjective and a verb. Complex verbs are of two types: transitive and intransitive.

- The transitive verbs are obtained by combining nouns/adjectives with verbs such as karnā 'to do', lenā 'to take', denā 'to give', jītnā 'to win' etc.
- The intransitive verbs are formed with the help of verbs such as honā 'to be/happen', lagnā 'to feel', ānā 'to come' etc.

Complex verbs (Complex predicates) are of the following three combinations:

1. noun + verb
2. adjective + verb
3. verb + verb

where the noun, adjective or the first verb contributes the semantic content and the verb or second verb accounts for the syntactic information of the construction. Noun/adjective and verb combinations are termed conjunct verbs, as in (1) and (2) in the examples below, whereas the combinations of two verbs are called compound verbs, as in the example (3) below:

NOUN + VERB
(1)

Shīlā-nē kām kiyā.
Shila(FEM).SG-ERG work(MASC).SG.NOM do.PRF.MASC.SG
'Shila did the work'

ADJECTIVE + VERB
(2)

Shīlā-nē kamrā sāf kiyā.
Shila(FEM).SG-ERG room(MASC).SG.NOM clean do.PRF.MASC.SG
'Shila cleaned the room'

VERB + VERB
(3)

Shīlā-nē sach bōl diyā.
Shila(FEM).SG-ERG truth(MASC).SG.NOM say give.PRF.MASC.SG
'Shila told the truth.'

In the above examples, there are verbal constructions which can be grouped into two categories of complex verbs, namely, conjunct verbs and compound verbs. (1) and (2) are examples of conjunct verbs since in (1) we find a noun kām 'work' and a perfective form of the verb karnā, 'do' whereas in (2) the verbal predicate exhibits a complex construction made of two elements, namely an adjective sāf 'clean' plus a verb karnā, 'do'. The example in (3), on the other hand, is considered a compound verb since the predicate exhibits two or more than two verbal elements, bōl 'tell' and diyā 'gave' (a form of dēnā 'give').

=== Aspects ===
There are three primary grammatical aspects: habitual aspect, perfective aspect and progressive aspect. Periphrastic verb forms consist of two elements, the first of these two elements is the aspect marker and the second element is the tense-mood marker. The three aspects are formed from their participle forms being used with the copula verb (honā "to be"). However, the primary participles which mark the aspects can be modified periphrastically by adding auxiliary participles constructed from auxiliary verbs such as rahnā (to stay/remain), ānā (to come), jānā (to go) after the primary participle to add a nuance to the aspect.

==== Habitual aspect ====
The habitual aspect is marked using the habitual participle, which is constructed by taking the verb root and suffixing -tā to it.

==== Perfective aspect ====
The perfective aspect is marked using the perfective participle, which is constructed by taking the verb root and suffixing -ā to it. If the verb root ends in a vowel, then -yā is suffixed to the verb root instead.

==== Progressive aspect ====
Hindustani has distinct constructions to convey progressive and continuous actions. Progressive actions are marked through the progressive aspect participle rahā used along with the verb root, while the continuous action is conveyed through the perfective adjectival participle, which is a combination of the verb's perfective participle and the perfective participle of the verb honā (to be), which is huā. The verbs in the examples 1a and 2a below are in the progressive aspect while in 1b and 2b the verbs are in their perfective adjectival participle form.

	Hindustani	Translation
1a	baiṭh rahā hai	He is sitting. (nuance: he is in the process of sitting)
1b	baiṭhā huā hai	He is sitting. (nuance: he is already sitting)
2a	śarṭ pahan rahī hū̃	I am wearing a shirt. (nuance: I (female) am in the process of wearing a shirt)
2b	śarṭ pahnī huī hū̃	I am wearing a shirt. (nuance: I (female) am already wearing a shirt)

Aspectual declension
Gender	Number	Habitual	Perfective	Progressive	Continuous
Masculine	Sing.	-tā	-(y)ā	+ rahā	+ huā
Masculine	Plu.	-te	-(y)e	+ rahe	+ hue
Feminine	Sing.	-tī	-(y)ī	+ rahī	+ huī
Feminine	Plu.	-tī̃	-(y)ī̃	+ rahī̃	+ huī̃

=== Moods ===
There are five grammatical moods which the three aspects can be put into. Moods in Hindustani are:

1. Indicative mood
2. Presumptive mood
3. Subjunctive mood
  - Regular subjunctive
    - Present subjunctive
    - Future subjunctive
  - Perfective subjunctive
    - Future subjunctive
4. Counterfactual mood
  - Conditional
  - Past subjunctive
5. Imperative mood
  - Present imperative
  - Future imperative

Notes:

- When making an if-clause, the conditional mood is used in both apodosis and the protasis unlike other languages such as the ones in the Romance branch which make use of unique past-subjunctive and conditional verb forms in the apodosis and the protasis, respectively.
- The regular future subjunctive is replaced by the perfective future subjunctive when an if-clause or a relative clause is used.

== Set of related verbs ==
Verbs are morphologically contrastive, leading to the existence of related verb sets divisible along such lines. While the derivation of different verb forms shows patterns, it does reach a level of variegation so as to make it somewhat difficult to outline all encompassing rules. Furthermore, some verb sets may have as many as four to five distinct members; also, the meaning of certain members of given sets may be idiosyncratic. These below are the verb forms that a verb can have —

1. Intransitive
  1. Involitional — these are actions that cannot be done intentionally.
    1. Dative — these involitional verbs require the subject to be in the dative case.
    2. Non-dative — these verbs require the subject to be in the nominative case.
  2. Volitional — these are actions that can be intentionally done.
    1. Ergative — these verbs require the subject to be in the ergative case when the verb is in the perfective aspect.
    2. Non-ergative — these verbs always require the subject to be in the nominative case even when the verb is in perfective aspect.
2. Transitive
  1. Direct — the subject itself experiences the action but the subject and the object are not the same
  2. Indirect — the subject imparts the action onto the object, the object is the experiencer of the action by the usually translated into English as "to make (someone/something) verb"
  3. Reflexive — the verb does action on the subject itself, the doer and experiencer of the action is the same subject
  4. Causative — the subject causes the action to happen

Starting from direct transitive verb forms, the other verb stems i.e., intransitive, causative, reflexive, indirect stems are produced according to these following (not exhaustive) assorted rules —

1. Root vowel changeː
  - a → ā
  - u / ū → o
  - i / ī → e
2. Sometimes the root vowel change accompanies the root's final consonant changeː
  - k → c
  - ṭ → r̥
  - l → Ø
3. Suffixation of -ā to form the indirect or reflexive formː
  - Root vowel changeː ū/o → u; e/ai/ā/ī → i
  - Insertion of semivowel l between such vowel-terminating stems
4. Suffixation of -vā (in place of -ā where it would occur) to form the causative verb stem

The meaning each verb in the verb set has is constructed from the direct form of the verb, for example: dekhnā (to see), dikhnā (to be seen), dikhānā (to make someone see; to show), dikhvānā (to cause to see). The table below shows some verbs and its verb set.

Set of related verbs
English verbs	Intransitive				Transitive			
English verbs	involitional		volitional		direct	indirect	reflexive	causative
English verbs	non-dative	dative	non-ergative	ergative	direct	indirect	reflexive	causative
be	honā	—	—	—	—	—	—	—
happen	—	honā	—	—	—	—	—	hovānā
do	—	—	—	—	karnā	karānā	—	karvānā
fall	girnā	—	—	—	—	girānā	—	girvānā
prepare	bannā	—	—	—	—	banānā	—	banvānā
send	bhijnā	—	—	—	bhejnā	—	bhejānā	bhijvānā
dance	nacnā	—	—	nācnā	—	nacānā	—	nacvānā
be found	milnā	—	—	—	—	—	—	—
unite	—	—	—	—	—	milānā	—	milvānā
receive	—	milnā	—	—	—	—	—	milvānā
open	khulnā	—	—	—	kholnā	—	khulānā	khulvānā
open	khulnā	—	—	—	kholnā	—	kholānā	kholvānā
learn	—	—	—	—	sīkhnā	sikhānā	—	sikhvānā
eat	—	—	—	—	khānā	khilānā	—	khilvānā
come	—	—	anā	—	—	—	—	—
to know how to	—	anā	—	—	—	—	—	—
drink	—	—	—	—	pīnā	pilānā	—	pilvānā
sell	biknā	—	—	—	becnā	—	becānā	bikvānā
see	—	dikhnā	—	—	dekhnā	dikhānā	—	dikhvānā
look like	lagnā	—	—	—	—	—	—	—
touch, stick (to)	—	—	lagnā	—	—	lagānā	—	lagvānā
feel, feel like	—	lagnā	—	—	—	lagānā	—	lagvānā
tell	—	—	—	kêhnā	—	—	kêhlānā	kêhêlvānā
say	—	—	—	bolnā	—	bulānā	—	bulvānā
spin	ghumnā	—	ghūmnā	—	—	ghumānā	—	ghumvānā
travel around	—	—	—	—	ghūmnā	ghumānā	—	ghumvānā
lie down	—	—	leṭnā	—	—	leṭānā	—	leṭvānā
sit	biṭhnā	—	baiṭhnā	—	—	baiṭhānā	—	baiṭhvānā
walk	—	—	calnā	—	—	calānā	—	calvātā
move	—	—	—	calnā	—	calānā	—	calvātā
be okay with	—	calnā	—	—	—	calānā	—	calvātā
sleep	sutnā	—	sonā	—	—	sulānā	—	sulvānā
wash, clean	dhulnā	—	—	—	dhonā	—	dhulānā	dhulvānā
break	ṭūṭnā	—	—	—	tor̥nā	—	tur̥ānā	tur̥vānā
die	marnā	—	—	—	mārnā	—	marānā	marvānā
move, shake	hilnā	—	—	—	hilānā	—	—	hilvānā
understand	—	—	—	samajhnā	—	samjhānā	—	samajhvānā
spread out	bichnā	—	—	—	—	bichānā	—	bichvānā
friction, rub	—	—	—	—	ghisnā	—	—	ghisvānā
wear out	ghisnā	—	—	—	—	—	ghisānā	ghisvānā
ashtonish	ca͠uknā	—	—	—	—	ca͠ukānā	—	ca͠ukvānā
tear	phaṭnā	—	—	—	phār̥nā	—	phar̥ānā	phar̥vānā
blast, shatter	phūṭnā, phaṭnā	—	—	—	phor̥nā	—	phor̥ānā	phor̥vānā
beat	piṭnā	—	—	—	pīṭnā	—	piṭānā	piṭvānā
cough	—	—	—	khā̃snā	—	—	—	khãsvānā
sneeze	—	—	—	chī̃kna	—	—	chĩkāna	chī̃kvāna
bathe	—	—	—	nahānā	—	nêhlānā	nêhêlnā	nêhêlvānā
shout	—	—	—	cillānā	—	—	—	cilvānā
scream	—	—	—	cīkhna	—	—	cikhānā	cīkhvānā
digest	pacnā	—		—	—	pacānā	—	pacvānā
play	—	—	—	—	khelnā	khelānā	—	khelvānā
know	—	—	—	jānnā	—	—	—	janvānā
sing	—	—	—	gānā	—	—	—	gavānā
fry	—	—	—	—	talnā	—	talānā	talvānā
laugh	—	—	hãsnā	—	—	hãsānā	—	hãsvānā

== Verb conjugations ==
There are four distinguished conjugation sets in Hindustani. The first person singular [1S] pronoun mãĩ, the second person singular [2S] intimate pronoun tū, the second person singular/plural [2S/2P] familiar pronoun tum, and the 2P formal pronoun āp. The first person plural [1P] pronoun ham and the third person plural [3P] conjugations are the same as the conjugations of āp, and the 3S conjugations are the same as that of the 2S pronoun tū. Hindi does not have third person personal pronouns and instead the demonstrative pronouns (ye "this/these", vo "that/those") double as the third person personal pronouns when they lack a noun argument.

There are very few irregular verbs. There are three types of irregularities that may occurː

1. Irregular indicative perfect conjugationsː
  - **honā** - to be; **karnā** - to do; **denā** - to give; **lenā** - to take; **pīnā** - to drink; **jānā** - to go
2. Irregular subjunctive conjugationsː
  - **honā** - to be; **lenā** - to take; **denā** - to give; **pīnā** - to drink; **jīnā** - to live
3. Irregular imperative conjugationsː
  - **lēnā** - to take; **dēnā** - to give; **pīnā** - to drink; **jīnā** - to live

=== Subjunctive mood conjugations ===
Subjunctive mood can be put into two tenses: the present and future tense. The only verb that has both the present and future subjunctive conjugations is the verb honā "to be" while all the other verbs only have the future subjunctive conjugations.

==== Present regular subjunctive ====
The present subjunctive conjugations for the verb honā "to be" are mentioned below. Present subjunctive conjugations of honā "to be" act as copulas that mark present subjunctive when used with aspectual participles.

mood	tense	gender	ma͠i	tū	tum	āp
**subjunctive**	**present**	♂ & ♀	hū̃	ho		hõ

==== Future regular subjunctive ====
The future subjunctive forms are constructed the following way by adding the conjugational suffixes to the verb root. The future subjunctive conjugations for the regular verb bolnā "to speak" (the verb root is bol-) is shown below. Future subjunctive conjugations of honā "to be" and rahnā "to stay" act as copulas that mark future subjunctive when used with aspectual participles.

mood	tense	gender	ma͠i	tū	tum	āp
**subjunctive**	**future**	♂ & ♀	-ū̃	-e	-o	-ẽ
**subjunctive**	**future**	♂ & ♀	bol**ū̃**	bol**e**	bol**o**	bol**ẽ**

There are a couple of verbs with irregular future subjunctive forms, they are mentioned below. Every monosyllabic verb root such as in pīnā "to drink", jīnā "to live" and sīnā "to sew" etc. change their long vowel ī to short vowel i when conjugated into future subjunctive.

mood	tense	gender	verb	regular stem	irregular stem	ma͠i	tū	tum	āp
**subjunctive**	**future**	♂ & ♀	lenā "to take"	le-	l-	lū̃	le	lo	lẽ
**subjunctive**	**future**	♂ & ♀	denā "to give"	de-	d-	dū̃	de	do	dẽ
**subjunctive**	**future**	♂ & ♀	pīnā "to drink"	pī-	pi-	piyū̃	piye	piyo	piyẽ

==== Future perfective subjunctive ====
(The conjugations for future perfective subjunctive are the same as past perfect conjugations and they are discussed in the past perfect section below)

There are two future subjunctive moods, first the regular subjunctive and the second, the perfective subjunctive which superficially has the same form as the perfect past forms of verbs but still expresses future events, it is only used with if clauses and relative clauses. In a semantic analysis, this use of the perfective aspect marker would not be considered perfective, since it is more closely related to subjunctive usage. Only the superficial form is identical to that of the perfective. This usage of perfective past as a future subjunctive is especially common colloquially; by describing the future action with a perfective verb and so stressing its completion.

==== Regular and perfective subjunctive usage ====
The regular subjunctive when used implies that the event in question is not envisaged as definitely, but does not at all imply that it is unlikely to come about. It also expresses desire or wish.

1. āp **cāhẽ** to ma͠i āpse hindi bolū̃gā. — "If you like, I'll speak Hindi with you".
2. acchā rahegā agar āp **āyẽ** — It'll be better if you come.
3. vo cāhtī hai ki ma͠i **āū̃**. — "she wants that I come."
4. usne bolā ki tum **nā jāo**. — "s/he said (wanted) that you don't go."

The perfect future subjunctive either assumes that an event will definitely happen or the event is actually going to happen. Perfective future subjunctive are not used with events that are relatively unlikely happeningsː

1. agar vo **āye** to mujhe usse milvānā. — Introduce me to him in case he comes.
2. jab vo **āye** to mujhe usse milvānā. — Introduce me to him when he comes.

Usually with if-clauses using either the regular future subjunctive or the perfect future subjunctive will give grammatically correct sentences, the meanings however will be different. There's a nuance of precaution, and perfective (completed) action attached to the future perfective subjunctive, it is also used when giving out warnings, while the regular subjunctive expresses just a desire or wishː

1. agar tūm **kaho** to ma͠i nahī̃ gāū̃gā — I won't sing if you say. (nuanceː "If you say so then I'll take your advice and won't sing.")
2. agar tūmne **kahā** to ma͠i nahī̃ gāū̃gā — I won't sing if you say (anything). (nuanceː "If you say anything to me, I won't sing at all.")

And usually replacing the perfective subjunctive with the regular subjunctive in relative clauses makes the sentence ungrammatical. However, replacing the perfective subjunctive with indicative future would still result in a grammatical sentence but with a different nuanceː

1. jis din tum **āye** us din karū̃gā — I'll do it the day you come.
2. *jis din tum **āo** us din karū̃gā — (intended) I'll do it the day you (will) come.
3. jis din tum **āoge** us din karū̃gā — I'll do it the day you will come.

=== Indicative mood conjugations ===
==== Present tense ====
The only verb in Hindustani that has indicative present tense forms is the verb honā "to be" and all other verbs lack this conjugation. Older forms of the language used to have present indicative forms but over time their meaning have change and now those forms are considered the future subjunctive forms which are discussed in the section above. These conjugations act as the present indicative copula with aspectual participles.

mood	tense	gender	ma͠i	tū	tum	āp
**indicative**	**present**	♂ & ♀	hū̃	hai	ho	ha͠i

Indicative present tense conjugations of honā "to be" act as copulas that mark the indicative present tense when used with aspectual participles.

==== Perfect past tense ====
The indicative perfect conjugations are derived from a participle and hence decline according to number and gender of the pronoun and not the pronoun itself. They are constructed by taking the verb root and adding the vowels -ā, -e, -ī, & -ī̃ respectively for masculine singular, masculine plural, feminine singular, and feminine plural. The perfect past conjugation also doubles as the perfective participle. Past perfect conjugations for the regular verb bolnā "to speak" (verb root is bol-) is shown below. Past perfect tense conjugations of honā "to be" and rêhnā "to stay" act as copulas that mark future perfective subjunctive when used with aspectual participles.

mood	tense	gender	ma͠i	tū	tum	āp
**indicative**	**perfect**	♂	-ā		-e	
**indicative**	**perfect**	♀	-ī			-ī̃
**indicative**	**perfect**	♂	bol**ā**		bol**e**	
**indicative**	**perfect**	♀	bol**ī**			bol**ī̃**

There are a couple of verbs that have irregular perfect past forms, these are mentioned belowː

Verbs Irregular in Indicative Perfect Conjugations
Verb	Regular Stem	Irregular Stem		Masculine		Feminine	
Verb	Regular Stem	Irregular Stem		Singular	Plural	Singular	Plural
honā "to be"	ho-	hu-		huā	hue	huī	huī̃
jānā "to go"	jā-	ga-		gayā	gaye	gayī	gayī̃
karnā "to do"	kar-	ki-	kī-	kiyā	kiye	kī	kī̃
denā "to give"	de-	di-	dī-	diyā	diye	dī	dī̃
lenā "to take"	le-	li-	lī-	liyā	liye	lī	lī̃
pīnā "to drink"	pī-	pi-	pī-	piyā	piye	pī	pī̃

==== Imperfect past tense ====
The only verb in Hindustani that has indicative present tense forms is the verb honā "to be" and all other verbs lack this conjugation. These indicative imperfect forms of honā "to be" come from Sanskrit स्थित (stʰita) "standing, situated" which are derived from the PIE root *steh₂- (“to stand”). Imperfect past tense conjugations of honā "to be" act as copula that mark indicative imperfect past when used with aspectual participles.

mood	tense	gender	ma͠i	tū	tum	āp
**indicative**	**perfect**	♂	th**ā**		th**e**	
**indicative**	**perfect**	♀	th**ī**			th**ī̃**

==== Future tense ====
The indicative future tense forms are constructed using the future subjunctive conjugations (which are discussed above) by adding the future marking suffix -gā that declines for the number and the gender of the noun that the pronoun refers to.

Future inflectional suffix
gender	singular	plural
♂	-gā	-gē
♀	-gī	

mood	tense	gender	ma͠i	tū	tum	āp
**subjunctive**	**future**	♂ & ♀	-ū̃	-e	-o	-ẽ
**indicative**	**future**	♂	-ū̃-gā	-e-gā	-o-ge	-ẽ-ge
**indicative**	**future**	♀	-ū̃-gī	-e-gī	-o-gī	-ẽ-gī
**indicative**	**future**	♂	bol**ū̃gā**	bol**egā**	bol**oge**	bol**ẽge**
**indicative**	**future**	♀	bol**ū̃gī**	bol**egī**	bol**ogī**	bol**ẽgī**

=== Presumptive mood conjugations ===
The only verb that has presumptive mood conjugations is the verb honā "to be" and all other verbs lack this conjugation. These are constructed from the present subjunctive by adding the future suffix -gā. The same conjugation is used for all three tensesː present, past, and future. Presumptive mood conjugations of honā "to be" act as copulas that mark presumptive mood when used with aspectual participles.

Future inflectional suffix
gender	singular	plural
♂	-gā	-gē
♀	-gī	

mood	tense	gender	ma͠i	tū	tum	āp
**subjunctive**	**present**	♂ & ♀	hū̃	ho		hõ
**presumptive**	**present** **past** **future**	♂	h**ū̃gā**	h**ogā**		h**õge**
**presumptive**	**present** **past** **future**	♀	h**ū̃gī**	h**ogī**		h**õgī**

=== Contrafactual mood conjugations ===
Just like the indicative imperfect past and the indicative perfect past conjugations, the contrafactual mood conjugations are also derived from a participle form and declines the same way as them. It is constructed by taking the verb root and adding the suffix -tā to it which declines for number and gender of the noun that the pronoun refers to. Contrafactual mood conjugations for all verbs are regular. Contrafactual mood can only be used in the past tense as it expresses hypothetical scenarios that "could have" happened but didn't. It acts as both the past subjunctive and the past conditional. Contrafactual mood conjugations of honā "to be" and rêhnā "to stay" act as copulas that mark contrafactual mood when used with aspectual participles.

The participle that makes up the contrafactual mood conjugations also double as the habitual aspect participle.

mood	tense	gender	ma͠i	tū	tum	āp
**contrafactual**	**past**	♂	-tā		-te	
**contrafactual**	**past**	♀	-tī			-tī̃
**contrafactual**	**past**	♂	bol**tā**		bol**te**	
**contrafactual**	**past**	♀	bol**tī**			bol**tī̃**

=== Imperative mood conjugations ===
The rules to form the imperatives areː Whenever a single-syllable verb root ends in the vowel -ī then the consonant -j- is added between the imperative conjugation suffix and the verb root.

1. **Intimate pronoun** (**tū**)ː
  1. Present imperative — The verb root is the imperative form. All the present imperatives for the pronoun **tū** are regular.
  2. Future imperative — The suffix **-iyo** is added to the verb root. For the verbs **lenā** and **denā**, the verb stem changes from **le-** and **de-** to just **l-** and **d-**, respectively. Hence forming the future imperatives **diyo** and **liyo**.
2. **Familiar pronoun** (**tum**)ː
  1. Present imperative — The suffix **-o** (or **-yo** when the verb root ends in a vowel) is added to the verb root. For the verbs **lenā** and **denā** the verb root changes to **l-** and **d-**, respectively. Hence forming **do** and **lo**. For **pīnā** the stem changes to **pi-**.
  2. Future imperative — The future imperative for **tum** is the same as the infintive form. All future imperative forms of **tum** are regular.
3. **Formal pronoun** (**āp**)ː
  1. Present imperative — The suffix **-iye** is added to the verb root. Some verbs whose roots are one-syllabled and end in the vowel **-ī** or **-i** form the formal imperatives by adding the consonant **-j-** between the root and suffix as **-j-iye**.
  2. Future imperative — The future suffix **-gā** is added to the present imperative form for the pronoun **āp**. So, equivalently the suffix **-iyegā** is added to the verb root as suffix following the same rules as the present imperative for **āp**.

Irregular verbs in imperative conjugations
Verb		2nd person pronoun					
Verb		tū (2S intimate)		tum (2S/2P familiar)		āp (2P formal)	
Verb		present	future	present	future	present	future
regular	bolnā "to speak"	bol	boliyo	bolo	bolnā	boliye	boliyegā
irregular	denā "to give"	de	**diyo**	**do**	denā	**dījiye**	**dījiyegā**
irregular	lenā "to take"	le	**liyo**	**lo**	lenā	**lījiye**	**lījiyegā**
irregular	pīnā "to drink"	pī	pīiyo	**piyo**	pīnā	**pījiye**	**pījiyegā**

**Noteː** The irregular forms are bolded in the table above.

== Participles ==
There are two types of participles, aspectual participles which mark the aspect and non-aspectual participles which do not mark aspect. In the table below which mentions the different participles present in the language, ɸ denotes the verb root. The verb root ɸ for non-complex verbs is a single root however for complex verbs ɸ is in the form of ɸ1 + ɸ2 where ɸ2 acts like ɸ of the non-complex verbs which is declinable according to the aspect, for example, for the verb karnā ("to do") the root is kar and for the complex verb kar jānā (which is one of the perfective forms of "to do") the root is "kar jā-" where ɸ1 = kar and ɸ2 = jā.

Participles
Participle		Participle				Usage and Copulas
Participle		♂		♀		Usage and Copulas
Participle		singular	plural	singular	plural	Usage and Copulas
Aspectual	Habitual	ɸ-tā	ɸ-te	ɸ-tī	ɸ-tī̃	The copulas that can be used with habitual and perfective aspect participles are: 1. honā (to be); 2. rahnā (to stay, remain); 3. ānā (to come); 4. jānā (to go)
Aspectual	Perfective	ɸ-(y)ā	ɸ-(y)e	ɸ-(y)ī	ɸ-(y)ī̃	The copulas that can be used with habitual and perfective aspect participles are: 1. honā (to be); 2. rahnā (to stay, remain); 3. ānā (to come); 4. jānā (to go)
Aspectual	Progressive	ɸ + rahā	ɸ + rahe	ɸ + rahī	ɸ + rahī̃	The copulas that can be used with progressive aspect participle are: 1. honā (to be); 2. rahnā (to stay, remain)
Aspectual	Perfective adjectival	ɸ-(y)ā huā	ɸ-(y)e hue	ɸ-(y)ī huī	ɸ-(y)ī huī̃	translation: "(already) verbed"
Aspectual	Imperfective adjectival	ɸ-tā huā	ɸ-te hue	ɸ-tī huī	ɸ-tī huī̃	translation: "(while) verbing"
Aspectual	Imperfective progressive	ɸ-te-ɸ-te				translation: "(while in the process of) verbing", "during verbing"
Aspectual	Perfective progressive	ɸ-(y)e-ɸ-(y)e				Only a few verbs which express a temporary state have perfective progressive participle. For e.g.: 1. baiṭhnā (to sit) → baiṭhe-baiṭhe = while (already) sitting 2. par̥nā (to lie flat, to fall flat) → par̥e-par̥e = while (already) lying flat 3. bichnā (to get spread out) → biche-biche = while (already) spread out
Non-aspectual	Infinitive	ɸ-nā	ɸ-ne	ɸ-nī	ɸ-nī̃	Infinitive participle is always takes in the dative case pronouns as the subject. (seeː Dative subjects & Quirky subjects) The copulas that are used with the infinitive participle are: 1. honā (to be) — shows what is to be done; "have to verb" or "want to verb" 2. rahnā (to stay, remain) — shows what was remaining to do 3. ānā (to come) — shows ability; ableness 4. par̥nā (to fall flat) — shows cumpulsion; inevitability; "(will) have to verb"; "had to verb" etc.; Grammaticalised conjugated verbs that are used with the infintive participle: 1. chāhiye (want) (from the verb chāhnā "to want/love") — used to give advice; "should"
Non-aspectual	Oblique infinitive	ɸ-ne				1. with postpositions; ɸ-ne mẽ (= in verbing); ɸ-ne se (= because of verbing); ɸ-ne ke liye (= for verbing, to verb); ɸ-ne ko (= to verb); ɸ-ne kā (= of verbing; with which could be verbed); 2. without postpositions; ɸ1-ne ɸ2-nā (e.g. karne jānā = to go somewhere to do something; karne lagnā = to start to do; to start doing)
Non-aspectual	Prospective	ɸ-ne-vālā	ɸ-ne-vāle	ɸ-ne-vālī	ɸ-ne-vālī̃	translation: "going to verb" ("honā" (to be) and "rahnā" (to stay) can be used as copulas)
Non-aspectual	Conjunctive	ɸ-ke (short for, ɸ-kar)				translations: "after verbing", "by verbing", "because of verbing", "while verbing"

Notes:

- ɸ-(y)ā denotes that when the verb root ɸ ends in a vowel, the consonant -y- is added, else it isn't.
- The participles which do not end in the vowel ā in their masculine singular form are cannot be declined according to gender or number, for example, the oblique infinitive and the progressive participle end in the vowel -e and hence have the same form for all gender and number combinations. Also, usually such participles do not take in the copula after them but instead a verb.
- Infinitive participles always use the dative pronouns as subjects, while other participles can have the nominative or the dative case pronouns as subjects, depending on the verb used. For example:
  1. mujhe bolnā acchā lagtā hai. = I like to speak. ("bolnā" here is the infinitive participle, and not the infinitive. It agrees in gender and number with the direct object in the sentence. It takes the default masculine form when no object is present.)
  2. ma͠i bolnā pasand kartā hū̃. = I like to speak. ("bolnā" here is the infinitive, and hence it cannot decline according to the gender and number)
  3. mujhe bolne se thakān hotī hai. = I get tired because of speaking.
  4. ma͠i bolne se thak jātā hū̃. = I get tired because of speaking.

== Copulas and subaspects ==
As discussed in the above section, there are three aspect marking participles which take in a copula in order to assign a grammatical mood and tense to the aspectual form. There are four verbs which can be used as the copula: honā (to be), rêhnā (to stay), ānā (to come), jānā (to go), and karnā (to do). Each of the four copulas provide a unique nuance to the aspect. The default (unmarked) copula is honā (to be). Below is a table showing the infinitive forms of each of the aspectual forms using different copulas:

Simple aspect	Perfective aspect					Habitual aspect				Progressive aspect		Translation
honā	huā honā	huā rêhnā	huā jānā	huā ānā	huā karnā	hotā honā	hotā rêhnā	hotā jānā	hotā ānā	ho rahā honā	ho rahā rêhnā	to happen
karnā	kiyā honā	kiyā rêhnā	kiyā jānā	kiyā ānā	kiyā karnā	kartā honā	kartā rêhnā	kartā jānā	kartā ānā	kar rahā honā	kar rahā rêhnā	to do
marnā	marā honā	marā rêhnā	marā jānā	marā ānā	marā karnā	martā honā	martā rêhnā	martā jānā	martā ānā	mar rahā honā	mar rahā rêhnā	to die

The other copulas unlike honā (to be) can also again be put into their aspectul forms and then the copula honā (to be) is used to mark the tense and the mood, hence forming subaspects. However, these copulas cannot be put into all three aspects. It depends on the verb and also the copula itself what grammatical aspects can the copula can be put into. The following two tables show subaspectual forms for each of the three aspects.

Perfective aspect
rêhnā			jānā				ānā	karnā
Habitual subaspect	Perfective subaspect	Progressive subaspect^{2}	Habitual subaspect^{1}	Perfective subaspect^{1}	Progressive subaspect^{2}		Progressive subaspect	Habitual subaspect
huā rêhtā honā	huā rahā honā	huā rêh rahā honā	*huā jātā honā	*huā gāyā honā	huā jā rahā honā	huā jā rahā rêhnā	huā ā rahā honā	huā kartā honā
kiyā rêhtā honā	kiyā rahā honā	kiyā rêh rahā honā	kiyā jātā honā	kiyā gayā honā	kiyā jā rahā honā	kiyā jā rahā rêhnā	kiyā ā rahā honā	kiyā kartā honā
marā rêhtā honā	marā rahā honā	marā rêh rahā honā	marā jātā honā	marā gayā honā	marā jā rahā honā	marā jā rahā rêhnā	marā ā rahā honā	marā kartā honā

^{1} When the copula jānā (to go) is used, only transitive and volitional intransitive verbs can be put into the habitual and perfective subaspect. So, *huā jātā honā and *huā gāyā honā are not valid constructions. However, somehow huā jā rahā honā is a valid construction but it means the same as hotā jā rahā honā which is the progressive subaspect of the habitual aspect using the copula jānā (shown below) but just emphasising the rate (shows its faster) at which the action is happening; progressive subaspects of the perfective aspect using jānā (to go) is often just the more emphasised version of the progressive subaspect of the habitual aspect using jānā (to go). marnā (to die) is intransitive but it is a volitional action especially when used metaphorically as in "pizzā khāne ke liye marā jā rahā hū̃" = "I am dying to eat a pizza". Other commonly used voliational usage of marnā (to die) is for e.g. "dying in a videogame".

^{2} The progressive subaspect of the perfective aspect can also use the copula rêhnā (to stay, remain) and it can be again conjugated into aspectual participle forms, hence forming what could be called a sub-sub-aspect. An example using habitual sub-subaspectː "jab bhī uske sāth bāhar jātī hū̃ vo marā jā rahā rêhtā hai pizzā khāne ke liye" = "Whenever I go out with him he always is (nuanceː I always find him) dying to eat a pizza". This sentence combines and mixes the nuances of all the three, perfective (main), progressive (sub), and habitual (subsub), aspects on the same verb marnā (to die).

Habitual aspect							Progressive aspect
rêhnā			jānā		ānā		rêhnā
Habitual subaspect	Perfective subaspect	Progressive subaspect	Habitual subaspect	Progressive subaspect	Habitual subaspect	Progressive subaspect	Habitual subaspect
hotā rêhtā honā	hotā rahā honā	hotā rêh rahā honā	hotā jātā honā	hotā jā rahā honā	hotā ātā honā	hotā ā rahā honā	ho rahā rêhtā honā
kartā rêhtā honā	kartā rahā honā	kartā rêh rahā honā	kartā jātā honā	kartā jā rahā honā	kartā ātā honā	kartā ā rahā honā	kar rahā rêhtā honā
martā rêhtā honā	martā rahā honā	martā rêh rahā honā	martā jātā honā	martā jā rahā honā	martā ātā honā	martā ā rahā honā	mar rahā rêhtā honā

== Light verbs ==
Compound verbs, a highly visible feature of Hindustani grammar, consist of a verbal stem plus a light verb. The light verb (also called "subsidiary", "explicator verb", and "vector") loses its own independent meaning and instead "lends a certain shade of meaning" to the main or stem verb, which "comprises the lexical core of the compound". While almost any verb can act as a main verb, there is a limited set of productive light verbs. Shown below are prominent such light verbs, with their independent meaning first outlined, followed by their semantic contribution as auxiliaries. Finally, having to do with the manner of an occurrence, compounds verbs are mostly used with completed actions and imperatives, and much less with negatives, conjunctives, and contexts continuous or speculative. This is because non-occurrences cannot be described to have occurred in a particular manner. The auxiliaries when combined with the main verb provides an aspectual sense to the main verb it modifies. Light verbs such as jānā "to go", ānā "to come", cuknā when combined with the main verb give the formed compound verb a perfective aspect, while retaining the original meaning of the main verb.

Frequent light verbs
Light verb	Explanation	Main verb	Examples
jānā "to go"	Shows perfective aspect (completed action) of the main verb which means gives a sense of completeness of the action, finality, or change of state.	1. ānā "to come"; 2. khānā "to eat"; 3. marnā "to die"; 4. pīnā "to drink"; 5. baiṭhnā "to sit"; 6. honā "to happen"	1. ā jānā "to arrive" " to have come"; 2. khā jānā "to eat up (all/everything/completely)"; 3. mar jānā "to be dead"; 4. pī jānā "to drink up (all/everything/completely)" "to gulp"; 5. baiṭh jānā "to sit down" "to have sit down"; 6. ho jānā "to have happened (completely)" "to have finished happening"
lenā "to take"	Suggests that the action is completed and the benefit of the action flows towards the doer. This auxiliary verb can also be used to soften down the tone of imperatives (commands) and usually is used to give suggestions.	1. paṛhnā "to read"; 2. karnā "to do"; 3. calnā "to walk"; 4. mārnā "to kill, hit"	1. paṛh lenā "to read (for oneself/for own's desire)"; 2. kar lenā "to do (something fully for oneself)" "to have finished doing something"; 3. cal lenā "to have walked"; 4. mār lenā "to kill (for oneself)"
denā "to give"	suggests that the action was completed and the benefit of the action flows away from the doer.	1. paṛhnā "to read, study"; 2. mārnā "to kill, hit"; 3. karnā "to do"	1. paṛh denā "to read (for someone)" "to read out"; 2. mār denā "to kill", "to kill off", "to murder"; 3. kar denā "to do (something completely for someone else and not oneself)"
ānā "to come"	Shows perfective aspect of the main verb which means gives a sense of completeness of the action, finality, or change of state. The meaning conveyed is the doer went somewhere to do something and came back after completing the action.	1. karnā "to do"; 2. nikalnā "to come out"	1. kar ānā "to finish (and come back)", "to do (and return)"; 2. nikal ānā "to escape"
cuknā "to have (already) completed something"	Shows sense of completeness of an action in the past, that the action was already done/finished/completed by the doer sometime in the past.	1. marnā "to die"; 2. jītnā "to win"	1. mar cuknā "to have already died"; 2. jīt cuknā "to have already won"

The first three light verbs in the above table are the most common of auxiliaries, and the "least marked", or "lexically nearly colourless". The nuance conveyed by an auxiliary can often be very subtle, and need not always be expressed with different words in English translation. lenā (to take) and denā (to give), transitive verbs, occur with transitives, while intransitive jānā (to go) occurs mostly with intransitives; a compound of a transitive and jānā (to go) will be grammatically intransitive as jānā (to go) is.

Other light verbs
Light verb	Explanation	Examples
ḍālnā "to throw, pour"	Indicates an action done vigorously, decisively, violently or recklessly. it is an intensifier, showing intensity, urgency, completeness, or violence.	1. mārnā "to hit/kill" → mār ḍālnā "to kill (violently)"; 2. pīnā "to drink" → pī ḍālnā "to drink (all of something in one go)".
baiṭhnā "to sit"	Implies an action done foolishly or stubbornly; shows speaker disapproval or an impulsive or involuntary action.	1. kêhnā "to say" → kêh baiṭhnā "to say something (involuntarily or by mistake)"; 2. karnā "to do" → kar baiṭhnā "to do (something as a blunder)"; 3. laṛnā "to fight" → laṛ baiṭhnā "to quarrel (foolishly, or without giving a second thought)".
paṛnā "to fall flat"	Connotes involuntary, sudden, or unavoidable occurrence;	1. uṭhnā "to get up" → uṭh paṛnā "to suddenly get up"
uṭhnā "to rise"	Functions like an intensifier; suggests inception of action or feeling, with its independent/literal meaning sometimes showing through in a sense of upward movement.	1. jalnā "to burn" → jal uṭhnā "to burst into flames"; 2. nācnā "to dance" → nāc uṭhnā "to break into dance".
saknā "to be able to"	A modal verb that indicates the capability of performing an action.	1. karnā "to do" → kar saknā "to be able to do"; 2. dekhnā "to see" → dekh saknā "to be able to see"
rakhnā "to keep, maintain"	Implies a firmness of action, or one with possibly long-lasting results or implications. It occurs with lenā and denā, meaning "to give/take (as a loan)", and with other appropriate verbs, showing an action performed beforehand. It usually works almost the same as cuknā the main difference being the nuance conveyed by rakhnā is that the action has either "continued effect till the present time" or "is more recent than the same action conveyed using cuknā." cuknā conveys a distant past.	1. dekhnā "to see" → dekh rakhnā "to have already seen"; 2. karnā "to do" → kar rakhnā "to have already done"
rêhnā "to remain/stay"	The continuous aspect marker rahā apparently originated as a compound verb with rahnā ("remain"): thus ma͠i bol rahā hū̃ = "I have remained speaking" → "I have continued speaking" → "I am speaking". However, it has lost the ability to take any form other than the imperfective, and is thus considered to have become grammaticalized.	1. karnā "to do"→ kar rahā rêhnā "to be/stay doing."; 2. karnā "to do"→ kar rahā honā "to be doing."
mārnā "to hit"	It is a non-productive light verb (LV) and is used with very limited verbs, most commonly with denā "to give".	1. denā "to give" → de mārnā "to hit once but with all force"
phāṛnā "to tear"	It is a non-productive LV. Used only with the verb cīrnā "to tear apart"	1. cīrnā "to tear apart" → cīr phāṛnā "to tear apart brutally"

== Ergativity and light verbs ==
Hindustani is an aspectually split ergative language, with the ergative case marker, -ne, appearing on the subject of the transitive perfective clauses. A standard ergative construction is shown below — the verb is a transitive perfective participle, the subject carries the ergative case marker -ne, the object is unmarked and the participle agrees in gender with the object.

(a)
(b)

Kabir-nē vo gār̥ī jaldī-se becī.
Kabir(MASC)-ERG that.DEM car(FEM).NOM quick-INST sell.PRF.FEM
"Kabir sold that car quickly"

Kabir-nē vo gār̥ī jaldī-se bec dī.
Kabir(MASC)-ERG that.DEM car(FEM).NOM quick.INST sell take.PRF.FEM
"Kabir sold that car quickly"

The light verb construction exemplified in (b) above has been studied extensively in Hindi linguistics. It is a two-verb sequence (referred to here as V1–v2) [bec = V1, dī = v2 ] in which the first verb (V1) is morphologically the bare stem and the second verb (v2) carries the usual clausal inflection. The V1 functions as the main verb, providing the bulk of meaning/thematic information, and the v2 is "relatively" light. This "light" v2 does provide certain subtle semantic information, mostly (though not entirely) aspectual/directional in nature.

=== Compound verbs and ergative marking ===
Ergative case marking in compound verb constructions is affected by the transitivity of the v2. McGregor (1972:104) notes that "Compound verbs are used in construction with -ne when both the stem verb and the auxiliary (=v2) are themselves used independently with -ne." Amritavalli (1979:77–78) comments "In sentences with compound verbs it is the transitivity (and perfectivity) of v2 that determines the ergative case-marking." The basic pattern of compound verb constructions is given in (1a)–(1c) below.

(1a)	Kabir-nē vo kitāb jaldī-se par̥h lī. Kabir(MASC)-ERG that.DEM book(FEM).NOM quick-INST read take.PRF.FEM "Kabir read that book quickly"
(1b)	*Kabir-nē vo kitāb jaldī-se par̥h gayī. Kabir(MASC)-ERG that.DEM book(FEM).NOM quick-INST read go.PRF.FEM intendedː "Kabir read that book quickly"
(1c)	Kabir vo kitāb jaldī-se par̥h gayā. Kabir(MASC).NOM that.DEM book(FEM).NOM quick-INST read go.PRF.MASC "Kabir read that book quickly"

Certain intransitive V1s do allow for ergative subjects when the light v2 is transitive. Intransitive V1s that permit ergative subjects with transitive v2's belong to the unergative khā̃snā "to cough" class of verbs. Verbs in this class of intransitives independently permit ergative subjects and the choice of -ne subjects has been argued to be associated with properties of volitionality or conscious choice. Some other voliational (intransitive) verbs which allow ergative case assignment are bolnā "to speak", chī̃knā "to sneeze", cillānā "to shout", nahānā "to take a bath" etc. In all these cases the agent has complete control and volition of the activity.

(2a)
(2b)

Kabir-ne khā̃s diyā
Kabir(MASC)-ERG cough do.PRF.MASC
"Kabir coughed"

Kabir-ne khā̃sā
Kabir(MASC)-ERG cough.PRF.MASC
"Kabir coughed"

Examples in (1a)–(2b) show that V1v2 compound verb constructions allow ergative subjects when both V1 and v2, when functioning as main verbs, independently allow ergative subjects. Crucial evidence as to the source of ergativity in V1v2 constructions comes from pairings in which the case properties of the V1 are distinct from those of the v2. Though it is rare to find V1(intransitive)v2(transitive) sequences in which the V1 is not independently an ergative case licensing verbs, such examples do exist: cal denā "to move-give" (=move, depart), khisak lenā "to slip away-take" (=to slip away) and sarak lenā "crawl-take" (=to slip away/to move away). Interestingly, V1v2 sequences of this type do not permit ergative subjects, despite the ability of the v2 to license ergative subjects when functioning as main verbs.

(3a)
(3b)

gār̥ī cal dī
car(FEM).NOM move give.PRF.FEM
"The car moved"

*gār̥ī-ne cal diyā
car(FEM).ERG move give.PRF.MASC
intendedː "The car moved"

Examples in (4a)-(4b) below show that the ergative case licensing property of the light v2 is nevertheless critical, as intransitive (usually unaccusative) v2's never allow ergative subjects, regardless of the ergative case licensing properties of the V1.

(4a)
(4b)

*Kabir-nē vo kitāb jaldī-se par̥h gayī.
Kabir(MASC)-ERG that.DEM book(FEM).NOM quick-INST read go.PRF.FEM
intendedː "Kabir read that book quickly"

*Sītā-nē bahut bar̥ī galtī kar baiṭhī.
Sita(FEM)-ERG very big.FEM mistake(FEM) do sit.PRF.FEM
intendedː "Sita made a very big mistake"

== Verb paradigm ==
=== Non-personal Forms ===
Participles

Undeclined forms
	Verb forms	translation
Infinitive	honā	1. to be; 2. to exist; 3. to happen; 4. to have
Oblique infinitive	hone	1. being; 2. existing; 3. happening; 4. having
Conjunctive	hoke / hokar	1. after happening; 2. after being/becoming
Imperfective progressive	hote-hote	1. while happening; 2. while being; 4. while existing
Perfective progressive^{1}	hue-hue	1. while (already) been

Participles (Declined forms)
	♂		♀		translation
	singular	plural	singular	plural	translation
Habitual	hotā	hote	hotī	hotī̃	1. happens (habitually) [present]; 2. used to happen [past]
Perfective	huā	hue	huī	huī̃	1. happened
Progressive	ho rahā	ho rahe	ho rahī	ho rahī̃	1. happening; 2. being
Infinitive	honā	hone	honī	honī̃	1. have/want/should (to) be; 2. have/want/should (to) happen; 3. have/want/should (to) exist
Prospective	honevālā	honevāle	honevālī	honevālī̃	1. going to be; 2. going to happen; 3. going to exist
Perfective adjectival	huā-huā	hue-hue	huī-huī	huī-huī̃	1. already been; 2. already happened
Habitual adjectival	hotā-huā	hote-hue	hotī-huī	hotī-huī̃	1. already been; 2. already happened

^{1} perfective progressive form of verbs is mainly only used with verbs that describe a temporary state. for e.g.
- baiṭhnā (to sit) → baiṭhe-baiṭhe = while (already) sitting
- baiṭhnā (to sit) → baiṭhte-baiṭhte = while (in the process of) sitting

=== Conjugation of verbs ===
All the verbs except honā (to be) are defective and cannot be conjugated into the following moods and tenses in their non-aspectual forms (or simple aspect):

- present indicative
- imperfect indicative
- presumptive mood
- present subjunctive

The verb honā (to be) serves as the copula whose conjugations are used to form the three aspectual forms of verbs (habitual, perfective, and progressive). In the tables below all the conjugations of the copula are shown on the top and all the conjugations of the verb karnā (to do) (like which all other verbs behave) are shown on the bottom.

VERB CONJUGATIONS (NON-ASPECTUAL FORMS)

honā (to be)
mood	tense	1S - ma͠i		2S - tum^{1} (singular & plural)		3S - yah/ye, vah/vo		1P - ham		Translations (3rd person)
mood	tense	1S - ma͠i		2S - tum^{1} (singular & plural)		3S - yah/ye, vah/vo		2P - āp^{1} (singular & plural)		Translations (3rd person)
mood	tense	1S - ma͠i		2S - tum^{1} (singular & plural)		2S - tū		3P - ye, ve/vo		Translations (3rd person)
mood	tense	♂	♀	♂	♀	♂	♀	♂	♀	Translations (3rd person)
indicative	present	hū̃		ho		hai		ha͠i		is, there is, exists
indicative	perfect^{3}	huā	huī	hue	huī	huā	huī	hue	huī̃	was, happened
indicative	imperfect	thā	thī	the	thī	thā	thī	the	thī̃	was
indicative	future^{2}	hoū̃gā	hoū̃gī	hooge	hoogī	hoegā	hoegī	hoẽge	hoẽgī	will be
presumptive	present	hū̃gā	hū̃gī	hoge	hogī	hogā	hogī	hõge	hõgī	might be
presumptive	past	hū̃gā	hū̃gī	hoge	hogī	hogā	hogī	hõge	hõgī	might have been
presumptive	future^{2}	hū̃gā	hū̃gī	hoge	hogī	hogā	hogī	hõge	hõgī	might be
subjunctive	present	hū̃		ho		ho		hõ		(that) it be
subjunctive	future	hoū̃		hoo		hoe		hoẽ		(that) it become
subjunctive	future^{3} (perfective)	huā	huī	hue	huī	huā	huī	hue	huī̃	(if/when) it happens
contrafactual	past	hotā	hotī	hote	hotī	hotā	hotī	hote	hotī̃	would have been
imperative	present	—		hoo		ho		hoiye		beǃ (right now)
imperative	future	—		honā		hoiyo		hoiyegā		beǃ (in the future)

karnā (to do)
mood	tense	1S - ma͠i		2S - tum^{1} (singular & plural)		3S - yah/ye, vah/vo		1P - ham		Translations (3rd person)
mood	tense	1S - ma͠i		2S - tum^{1} (singular & plural)		3S - yah/ye, vah/vo		2P - āp^{1} (singular & plural)		Translations (3rd person)
mood	tense	1S - ma͠i		2S - tum^{1} (singular & plural)		2S - tū		3P - ye, ve/vo		Translations (3rd person)
mood	tense	♂	♀	♂	♀	♂	♀	♂	♀	Translations (3rd person)
indicative	perfect^{3}	kiyā	kī	kiye	kī	kiyā	kī	kiye	kī̃	did
indicative	future	karū̃gā	karū̃gī	karoge	karogī	karegā	karegī	karẽge	karẽgī	will do
subjunctive	future	karū̃		karo		kare		karẽ		(that) s/he do
subjunctive	future^{3} (perfective)	kiyā	kī	kiye	kī	kiyā	kī	kiye	kī̃	(if/when) s/he does
contrafactual	past	kartā	kartī	karte	kartī	kartā	kartī	karte	kartī̃	would have done
imperative	present	—		karo		kar		kariye		doǃ (right now)
imperative	future	—		karnā		kariyo		kariyegā		doǃ (in the future)

^{1} the second person pronouns tum, āp can be used both in singular and plural sense akin to the English second person pronoun "you".
^{2} the indicative future and presumptive future conjugations are often used synonymously.
^{3} the simple perfect verb forms when used in an if-cause or a relative clause, they would not be considered perfect indicative but instead a type of future subjunctive.

=== Aspectual form of verbs ===
Using the three aspectual participles, the habitual, perfective, and the progressive aspectual forms are constructed. The aspectual forms for the verb karnā (to do) are shown in the table below:

VERB CONJUGATIONS (ASPECTUAL FORMS)

mood	tense	1S - ma͠i		2S - tum^{1}		3S - yah/ye, vah/vo (singular)		1P - ham		Translations (3rd person)
mood	tense	1S - ma͠i		2S - tum^{1}		3S - yah/ye, vah/vo (singular)		2P - āp^{1} (singular & plural)		Translations (3rd person)
mood	tense	1S - ma͠i		2S - tum^{1}		2S - tū		3P - ye, ve/vo		Translations (3rd person)
mood	tense	♂	♀	♂	♀	♂	♀	♂	♀	Translations (3rd person)
HABITUAL ASPECT^{3}
indicative	present	kartā hū̃	kartī hū̃	karte ho	kartī ho	kartā hai	kartī hai	karte ha͠i	kartī ha͠i	s/he does
indicative	past	kartā thā	kartī thī	karte the	kartī thī	kartā thā	kartī thī	karte the	kartī thī̃	s/he used to do
indicative	future^{3}	kartā rahũgā	kartī rahũgī	karte rahoge	kartī rahogī	kartā rahegā	kartī rahegī	karte rahẽge	kartī rahẽgī	s/he will keep doing
presumptive	present	kartā hū̃gā	kartī hū̃gī	karte hoge	kartī hogī	kartā hogā	kartī hogī	karte hõge	kartī hõgī	s/he (presumably) does
presumptive	past	kartā hū̃gā	kartī hū̃gī	karte hoge	kartī hogī	kartā hogā	kartī hogī	karte hõge	kartī hõgī	s/he (presumably) used to do
subjunctive	present	kartā hū̃	kartī hū̃	karte ho	kartī ho	kartā ho	kartī ho	kartā hõ	kartī hõ	(that) s/he does
subjunctive	future	kartā rahũ	kartī rahũ	karte raho	kartī raho	kartā rahe	kartī rahe	karte rahẽ	kartī rahẽ	(that) s/he continuous doing
subjunctive	future^{6} (perfective)	kartā rahā	kartī rahī	karte rahe	kartī rahī	kartā rahā	kartī rahī	karte rahe	kartī rahī̃	(if/when) s/he keeps doing
contrafactual	past	kartā hotā	kartī hotī	karte hote	kartī hotī	kartā hotā	kartī hotī	karte hote	kartī hotī̃	1. s/he would have been doing; 2. (wish) she were doing
imperative^{4}	present	—	—	karte raho	kartī raho	kartā rêh	kartī rêh	karte rahiye	kartī rahiye	keep doingǃ (as you are doing right now)
imperative^{4}	future	—	—	karte rêhnā	kartī rêhnā	kartā rahiyo	kartī rahiyo	karte rahiyegā	kartī rahiyegā	keep doingǃ (in the future as well)
PERFECTIVE ASPECT
indicative	present	kiyā hū̃	kī hū̃	kiye ho	kī ho	kiyā hai	kī hai	kiye ha͠i	kī ha͠i	s/he has done
indicative	past	kiyā thā	kī thī	kiye the	kī thī	kiyā thā	kī thī	kiye the	kī thī̃	s/he had done
indicative	future^{5}	kiyā hoū̃gā	kī hoū̃gī	kiye hooge	kī hoogī	kiyā hoegā	kī hoegī	kiye hoẽge	kī hoẽgī	s/he will have done
indicative	future^{5}	kiyā rahū̃gā	kī rahū̃gī	kiye rahoge	kī rahogī	kiyā rahegā	kī rahegī	kiye rahẽge	kī rahẽgī	s/he will have done
presumptive	present	kiyā hū̃gā	kī hū̃gī	kiye hoge	kī hogī	kiyā hogā	kī hogī	kiye hõge	kī hõgī	s/he might have done
presumptive	past	kiyā hū̃gā	kī hū̃gī	kiye hoge	kī hogī	kiyā hogā	kī hogī	kiye hõge	kī hõgī	s/he might have done
subjunctive	present	kiyā hū̃	kī hū̃	kiye ho	kī ho	kiyā ho	kī ho	kiye hõ	kī hõ	(that) s/he has done
subjunctive	future^{5}	kiyā hoū̃	kī hoū̃	kiye hoo	kī hoo	kiyā hoe	kī hoe	kiye hoẽ	kī hoẽ	(that) s/he will have done
subjunctive	future^{5}	kiyā rahū̃	kī rahū̃	kiye raho	kī raho	kiyā rahe	kī rahe	kiye rahẽ	kī rahẽ	(that) s/he will have done
subjunctive	future^{6} (perfective)	kiyā rahā	kī rahī	kiye rahe	kī rahī	kiyā rahā	kī rahī	kiye rahe	kī rahī̃	(if/when) s/he will have done
contrafactual	past	kiyā hotā	kī hotī	kiye hote	kī hotī	kiyā hotā	kī hotī	kiye hote	kī hotī̃	1. s/he would have done; 2. (wish) s/he had done
imperative^{4}	present	—	—	kiye raho	kī raho	kiyā rêh	kī rêh	kiye rahiye	kī rahiye	keep it doneǃ (right now)
imperative^{4}	future	—	—	kiye rêhnā	kī rêhnā	kiyā rahiyo	kī rahiyo	kiye rahiyegā	kī rahiyegā	keep it doneǃ (in the future)
PROGRESSIVE ASPECT
indicative	present	kar rahā hū̃	kar rahī hū̃	kar rahe ho	kar rahī ho	kar rahā hai	kar rahī hai	kar rahe ha͠i	kar rahī ha͠i	s/he is doing
indicative	past	kar rahā thā	kar rahī thī	kar rahe the	kar rahī thī	kar rahā thā	kar rahī thī	kar rahe the	kar rahī thī̃	s/he was doing
indicative	future^{2,5}	kar rahā hoū̃gā	kar rahī hoū̃gī	kar rahe hooge	kar rahī hoogī	kar rahā hoegā	kar rahī hoegī	kar rahe hoẽge	kar rahī hoẽgī	s/he will be doing
indicative	future^{2,5}	kar rahā rahū̃gā	kar rahī rahū̃gī	kar rahe rahoge	kar rahī rahogī	kar rahā rahegā	kar rahī rahegī	kar rahe rahẽge	kar rahī rahẽgī	s/he will be doing
presumptive	present	kar rahā hū̃gā	kar rahī hū̃gī	kar rahe hoge	kar rahī hogī	kar rahā hogā	kar rahī hogī	kar rahe hõge	kar rahī hõgī	s/he might be doing
presumptive	past	kar rahā hū̃gā	kar rahī hū̃gī	kar rahe hoge	kar rahī hogī	kar rahā hogā	kar rahī hogī	kar rahe hõge	kar rahī hõgī	s/he might have been doing
presumptive	future^{2}	kar rahā hū̃gā	kar rahī hū̃gī	kar rahe hoge	kar rahī hogī	kar rahā hogā	kar rahī hogī	kar rahe hõge	kar rahī hõgī	s/he presumably will be doing
subjunctive	present	kar rahā hū̃	kar rahī hū̃	kar rahe ho	kar rahī ho	kar rahā ho	kar rahī ho	kar rahe hõ	kar rahī hõ	(that) s/he is doing
subjunctive	future	kar rahā hoū̃	kar rahī hoū̃	kar rahe hoo	kar rahī hoo	kar rahā hoe	kar rahī hoe	kar rahe hoẽ	kar rahī hoẽ	(that) s/he will be doing
subjunctive	future^{5,6} (perfective)	kar rahā huā	kar rahī huī	kar rahe hue	kar rahī huī	kar rahā huā	kar rahī huī	kar rahe hue	kar rahī huī̃	(if/when) s/he will be doing
subjunctive	future^{5,6} (perfective)	kar rahā rahā	kar rahī rahī	kar rahe rahe	kar rahī rahī	kar rahā rahā	kar rahī rahī	kar rahe rahe	kar rahī rahī̃	(if/when) s/he will be doing
contrafactual	past	kar rahā hotā	kar rahī hotī	kar rahe hote	kar rahī hotī	kar rahā hotā	kar rahī hotī	kar rahe hote	kar rahī hotī̃	1. s/he would have been doing; 2. (wish) s/he were doing
imperative	present	—	—	kar rahe raho	kar rahī rêhnā	kar raha rêh	kar rahī rêh	kar rahe rahiye	kar rahī rahiye	be doingǃ (now)
imperative	future	—	—	kar rahe rehnā	kar rahī rêhnā	kar rahā rahiyo	kar rahī rahiyo	kar rahe rahiyegā	kar rahī rahiyegā	be doingǃ (in the future)

^{1} the pronouns tum and ham are grammatically plural but are more often used in as singular pronouns, akin to the English pronoun "you".
^{2} the indicative and presumptive future conjugations using the copula honā (to be) are often used synonymously.
^{3} the habitual aspect cannot express the future using the copula "honā" (to be), instead the copula verb "rêhnā" (to stay) is used to construct future forms.
^{4} the imperative mood of the habitual and perfective aspect forms require the copula "rêhnā" (to stay).
^{5} the indicative future for the perfective and progressive aspects can alternatively also use the copula "rêhnā" (to stay), they are roughly synonymous.
^{6} the simple perfect verb forms when used in an if-cause or a relative clause, they would not be considered perfect indicative but instead a type of future subjunctive.

== Bibliography ==
- Masica, Colin (1991). The Indo-Aryan Languages. Cambridge: Cambridge University Press. ISBN 978-0-521-29944-2.
- Schmidt, Hans (2003). "Temathesis in Rotuman" (PDF). In John Lynch (ed.). Issues in Austronesian Historical Phonology. Pacific Linguistics Research School of Pacific and Asian Studies. pp. 175–207. ISBN 978-0-85883-503-0.
- Shapiro, Michael C. (2003). "Hindi". In Cardona, George; Jain, Dhanesh (eds.). The Indo-Aryan Languages. Routledge. pp. 250–285. ISBN 978-0-415-77294-5.
- Snell, Rupert; Weightman, Simon (1989). Teach Yourself Hindi (2003 ed.). McGraw-Hill. ISBN 978-0-07-142012-9.
