= Ormeley Lodge =

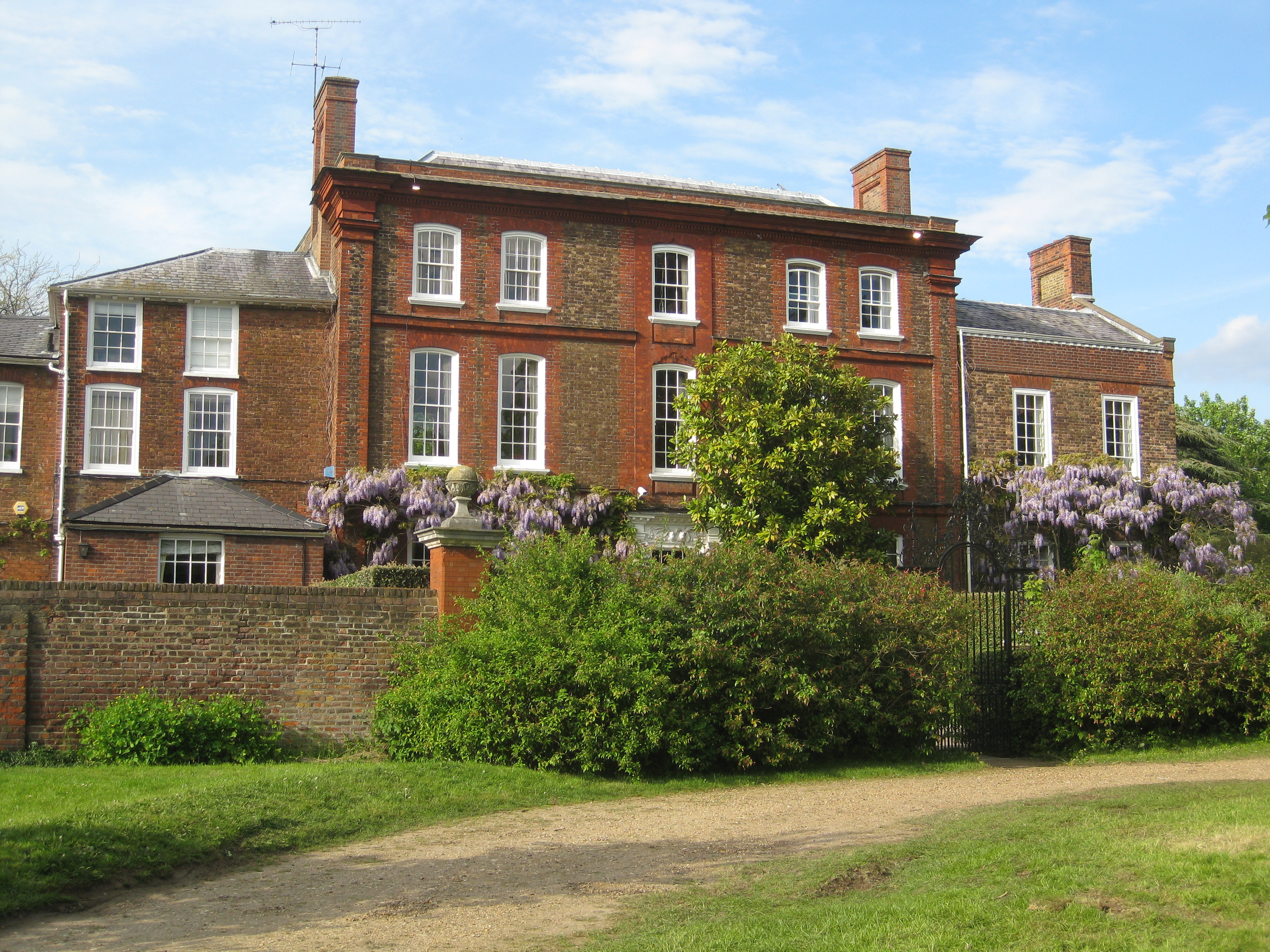
- Ormeley Lodge in May 2009
- Interactive map of the Ormeley Lodge area

General information
- Type: House
- Architectural style: Georgian
- Location: Ham Common, Ham Gate Avenue, Ham, TW10 5HB, Ham, London, England
- Coordinates: 51°26′07″N 0°18′08″W
- Construction started: c. 1715
- Owner: Lady Annabel Goldsmith (until her death in October 2025)

Technical details
- Floor count: 3

Listed Building – Grade II*
- Official name: Ormeley Lodge, with gates and railings to front
- Designated: 10 January 1950
- Reference no.: 1286489

Ormeley Lodge is a Grade II* listed early 18th-century Georgian house, set in 6 acres (2 ha) on the edge of Ham Common, near to Richmond Park in Ham, London. It was, until her death in October 2025, owned by Lady Annabel Goldsmith.

== Description ==
Bridget Cherry and Nikolaus Pevsner describe the house as "exquisite" and point out the "[b]eautiful doorway with Corinthian pilasters and a frieze carved with cherubs' heads and palm leaves" and the "[o]utstandingly fine wrought-iron gatepiers, gates and railings".

The house, together with the gates and railings, has been Grade II* listed since 1950. The grounds include a tennis court and swimming pool. The gardens are occasionally open to the public as part of the National Gardens Scheme.

== History ==
The house was built on the site of a former cottage in about 1715 by Thomas Hammond, son of a wealthy landowner from Teddington. At about the same time John Campbell, 2nd Duke of Argyll began establishing the neighbouring Sudbrook Lodge and estate. Charles Townshend, second husband to Caroline, one of Campbell's four daughters, bought Ormeley Lodge in 1763 as a country retreat and they lived there until 1767, moving to Sudbrook Lodge on the death of the Dowager Duchess of Argyll.

A claim that the house was the honeymoon destination of George, Prince of Wales and Maria Fitzherbert on 15 December 1785, following their secret marriage, has not been substantiated.

Between 1814 and 1819 the house, then called Ormly Lodge, was one of the homes of Sir John Sinclair, President of the Board of Agriculture and whose fourth daughter, Catherine Sinclair, was a notable writer of children's fiction. In 1817 a footpath was built from the Petersham Road passing in front of the Lodge and leading to Ham Gate Lodge at the entrance to Richmond Park. Named Barnard's Footpath after its benefactor, it was known as Park Road by 1861 and was renamed Ham Gate Avenue in 1945.

Mrs Elizabeth Palmer (c.1757-1832) was the wealthy widow, reputedly worth £40,000 (equivalent to £4.94 million or US$6.32 million in 2024) a year, of Joseph Budworth (1756–1815), a writer and poet, who changed his name to Palmer in 1812. She had lived at the Lodge since the 1820s. On 31 May 1832 she was living as a recluse at Ormly Lodge together with Richard Sharp, a nephew of her late husband, Francis, her elderly brother, and William Bellingham, her son. She was wearing a "full muslin dress with a quantity of loose trimming about it" when she retired to bed with a candle. It was conjectured that part of her dress caught fire from the candle. The Evening Standard reported the events.

"At half-past nine o'clock Mrs. Palmer desired her maid to inform Mr. Sharpe, to whom she was greatly attached, that feeling herself rather indisposed, she should not be able to see him again that night. The servant accordingly proceeded down stairs for that purpose leaving her mistress at the door of her bed-chamber, with a lighted candle in her hand. Scarcely had the young woman left Mrs. Palmer than Miss Potter, the housekeeper, who was reading in the front parlour, heard a noise as if some person was gasping for breath. She immediately ran into the hall; but, before any answer could be made to her inquiries, she distinctly heard the same sound again, issuing from an apartment on the first floor, and it instantly occurred to her that Mrs. Palmer was either in a fit, or had met with some accident. Miss Potter rushed up stairs, when the first object that met her view, was her mistress enveloped in flames, and standing with both arms extended, in the door-way of a passage leading and immediately contiguous to her bed-room. The horrifying sight for the instant paralysed her exertions; but momentarily recovering herself, she attempted to extinguish the flames, but without effect. The cries of Miss Potter for assistance alarmed Mr. Sharpe, who also in vain tried to put out the fire, which completely enveloped the unfortunate lady. There was nothing near sufficiently incombustible with which they could smother the flames, and they continued to endeavour to extinguish them with their hands. The smoke, however, was so dense that it nearly suffocated them, and they were under the necessity of leaving Mrs. Palmer to her fate, or they would themselves have met their deaths by suffocation. As it was, they were much burnt, but more particularly Mr. Sharpe, who received some severe burns on his face and hands. The smoke, it would seem, prevented Mrs. Palmer calling loudly for aid; and from the period at which she was discovered on fire until she fell on the floor insensible and half burnt, she was unable to utter a word. There can be no doubt she died from suffocation, and when she fell her head struck against the outer door immediately facing the stairs. The flames from her head-dress had partially ignited the canvas which formed the interior covering of the door, and left a burnt hole about the size of the unfortunate lady’s head. When Mr. Sharpe recovered from the effects of the smoke, he ran into Mrs. Palmer's bedroom, and for the first time ascertained that it was on fire; the flames were extending their ravages throughout the room, which was very shortly completely filled with fire. An alarm was given, and about 50 persons, who were at the time attending the fair on the common, most promptly lent their aid. Water was plentifully supplied to them, and they succeeded in confining the flames to the room in which they originated."

A well-attended coroner's inquest took place the following day at Ormly Lodge which concluded that her death was an accident. Over £3,300 in cash was found in a closet.

The grand funeral took place at the Chapel Royal, Hampton Court, and she was buried in the family vault at St Peter's Church, West Molesey, along with her husband. A service was also held at the newly built St Andrew's Church, Ham.

Mrs Palmer's daughter, Emma Mary, who was married to William Alexander Mackinnon, failed when she contested her mother's will “on the ground that they were procured by undue influence and importunity” by Mr Sharp. Mrs Palmer left copyhold property worth £17,000 (equivalent to £2.1 million or US$2.68 million in 2024), personal property worth £200,000 (equivalent to £24.71 million or US$31.58 million in 2024) and £38,000 in Ireland. She left the bulk of her property to Mr Sharp, who as well as being her husband's nephew was also agent managing her estates in Ireland, in trust for her son and brother, who were both described as "imbecile in mind"; they both already had incomes worth £5,000 and £8,000 respectively. On their deaths the remaining residue to be held in trust by Mr Sharp for her daughter and then divided between her children. Mr Sharp received a legacy of £10,000 and £5,400 in trust for Mrs Mackinnon. Francis Palmer died in 1834 and Mrs Palmer's son died in 1853; Ormley Lodge and Mole Lodge in West Molesey were sold in 1854.

In 1860 Mary Cawthorne Hunter, daughter of the late John Alexander Hunter of Ormeley Lodge, married Sir Edmund Arnaut Grattan. Capt Charles Hunter, son of John A Hunter, died at Ormeley Lodge in 1866.

Later the house was occupied by Lauchlan Mackinnon, a captain in the Royal Navy and son of W A Mackinnon, who wrote three books about his experiences. He died there in 1877. The Mackinnon family lived there until about 1891.

The house was bought in 1893 by Charles Hanbury-Tracy, 4th Baron Sudeley and his wife, Ada, daughter of Frederick Tollemache, living there until 1922. Their youngest son Felix, who was killed in action in 1914 is commemorated on a memorial in nearby St Andrew's Church, Ham. Their second son, Algernon, died in 1915 and is buried at St Peter's Church, Petersham. Their daughter, Alice, was married at St Andrew's in 1898.

The house's link to the Earls of Dysart, to whom Townshend, Sinclair and Hanbury-Tracy had all been connected by marriage, was broken in 1949 when the Tollemache family auctioned the Ham estates. Ormeley Lodge was purchased by antique dealer Ronald Lee. Lee held a loan exhibition entitled Masterpieces of British Art and Craftsmanship in the house in 1954, which was attended by The Queen Mother. Later that year Lee sold the house to the Earl of Westmorland and in 1964 it was sold to Lord and Lady Howard de Walden.

Ormeley Lodge was subsequently purchased by Sir James Goldsmith in the mid-1970s, and, with Lady Annabel Goldsmith, it became home for their family of five children, the elder three from Annabel's first marriage; Rupert, Robin and India, Jemima and Zac, and a sixth, Ben, being born after the move.
