= Sir William Lewis, 1st Baronet =

Sir William Lewis, 1st Baronet (26 March 1598 – November 1677) of Llangorse, Brecon and Bordean House, East Meon, Hampshire, supported the Parliamentary cause during the English Civil War. He sat in the House of Commons variously between 1640 and 1677.

== Biography ==
Lewis was the son of Lodowick Lewis of Trewalter, and his wife, a daughter of William Watkins of Llangorse. He was created Baronet of Llangorse on 14 September 1628 and was High Sheriff of Breconshire for 1619 and 1636.

In April 1640, Lewis was elected Member of Parliament for Petersfield in the Short Parliament. He was re-elected MP for Petersfield in November 1640 for the Long Parliament, where he sat until he was excluded under Pride's Purge. He was Parliamentary Governor of Portsmouth for 1642–43.

Lewis was elected in March 1660 as a member of the Convention Parliament for Breconshire. In 1661 he was elected MP for Lymington in the Cavalier Parliament where he sat until his death.

Lewis died at the age of 79. He had married Mary, the daughter of Robert Calton of Goring, Oxfordshire and the widow of Sir Thomas Neale of Warnford, Hampshire. He had one son, who predeceased him, and two daughters. The title thus became extinct.

== Notes ==
Parliament of England
Vacant Parliament suspended since 1629	Member of Parliament for Petersfield; 1640–1648; With: William Uvedale	Not represented in the Rump Parliament
Preceded by Col. Philip Jones	Member of Parliament for Breconshire; 1660	Succeeded by Sir Henry Williams, 2nd Baronet
Preceded by John Button; Henry Bromfield	Member of Parliament for Lymington; 1661–1667; With: John Bulkeley 1661–1662; Sir Nicholas Steward, 1st Baronet 1663–1677	Succeeded by Sir Richard Knight; Sir Nicholas Steward, 1st Baronet
Baronetage of England
New creation	Baronet (of Llangorse); 1628–1677	Extinct
