= Henry Dawley =

English politician (1646–1703)

Henry Dawley (1646–1703) was MP for Lymington from 1680 to 1685.

Dawley was born at Sparsholt, Hampshire, the son of Henry Dawley and Anne née Worsley. He was educated at Wadham College, Oxford. In 1670 he married Mary Collins of Newport, Isle of Wight: they had one son and three daughters. He was appointed a Freeman of Winchester in 1677, and of Lymington in 1680. He was Commissioner for Assessment for Hampshire from 1679 to 1680 and again from 1689 to 1702. He was a JP from 1679 to 1689; Commissioner of Inquiry for the New Forest from 1691; and Deputy Lieutenant of Hampshire from 1689. In 1697 he was Colonel of a Regiment of Hampshire Militia Foot.

Parliament of Great Britain
Preceded by John Button	Member of Parliament for Lymington; 1680–1685; With: John Burrard	Succeeded by Richard Holt
