= Rivett-Carnac baronets =

Baronetcy in the Baronetage of the United Kingdom

Escutcheon of the Rivett-Carnac baronets

The Rivett-Carnac baronetcy, of Derby, is a title in the Baronetage of the United Kingdom. It was created on 12 March 1836 for James Rivett-Carnac, Chairman of the East India Company, Member of Parliament for Sandwich and Governor of Bombay. His father James Rivett had assumed by royal warrant the additional surname of Carnac in 1801. The second Baronet represented Lymington in the House of Commons as a Conservative.

The fourth Baronet was missing for many years, with his last confirmed location being Seattle in 1906. After this date he was also reported to have visited Portland, Oregon, Philadelphia, Standerton, Durban and Vancouver. On 11 March 1924 an order was issued in the Chancery Division of the High Court of Justice, presuming his death to have occurred on 31 December 1909.

Admiral John Rivett-Carnac was the younger brother of the first Baronet. James Rivett-Carnac, a younger son of the sixth Baronet, was a vice-admiral in the Royal Navy. The designer Lulu Guinness is the daughter of the ninth Baronet.

== Rivett-Carnac baronets, of Derby (1836) ==
- Sir James Rivett-Carnac, 1st Baronet (1784–1846)
- Sir John Rivett-Carnac, 2nd Baronet (1818–1883)
- Sir James Henry Sproule Rivett-Carnac, 3rd Baronet (1846–1909)
- Sir Claud James Rivett-Carnac, 4th Baronet (1877–1909)
- Sir William Percival Rivett-Carnac, 5th Baronet (1847–1924)
- Sir Clennell George Rivett-Carnac, 6th Baronet (1851–1932)
- Sir Henry George Crabbe Rivett-Carnac, 7th Baronet (1889–1972)
- Canon Sir (Thomas) Nicholas Rivett-Carnac, 8th Baronet (1927–2004)
- Sir Miles James Rivett-Carnac, 9th Baronet (1933–2009)
- Sir Jonathan James Rivett-Carnac, 10th Baronet (born 1962)

The heir presumptive is the present baronet's nephew, Tom Alexander Miles Rivett-Carnac (born 1996).

== Notes ==
Baronetage of the United Kingdom
Preceded by Campbell baronets	Rivett-Carnac baronets of Derby; 12 March 1836	Succeeded by Fairfax baronets
