= Sir Nicholas Steward, 1st Baronet =

English MP

Sir Nicholas Steward
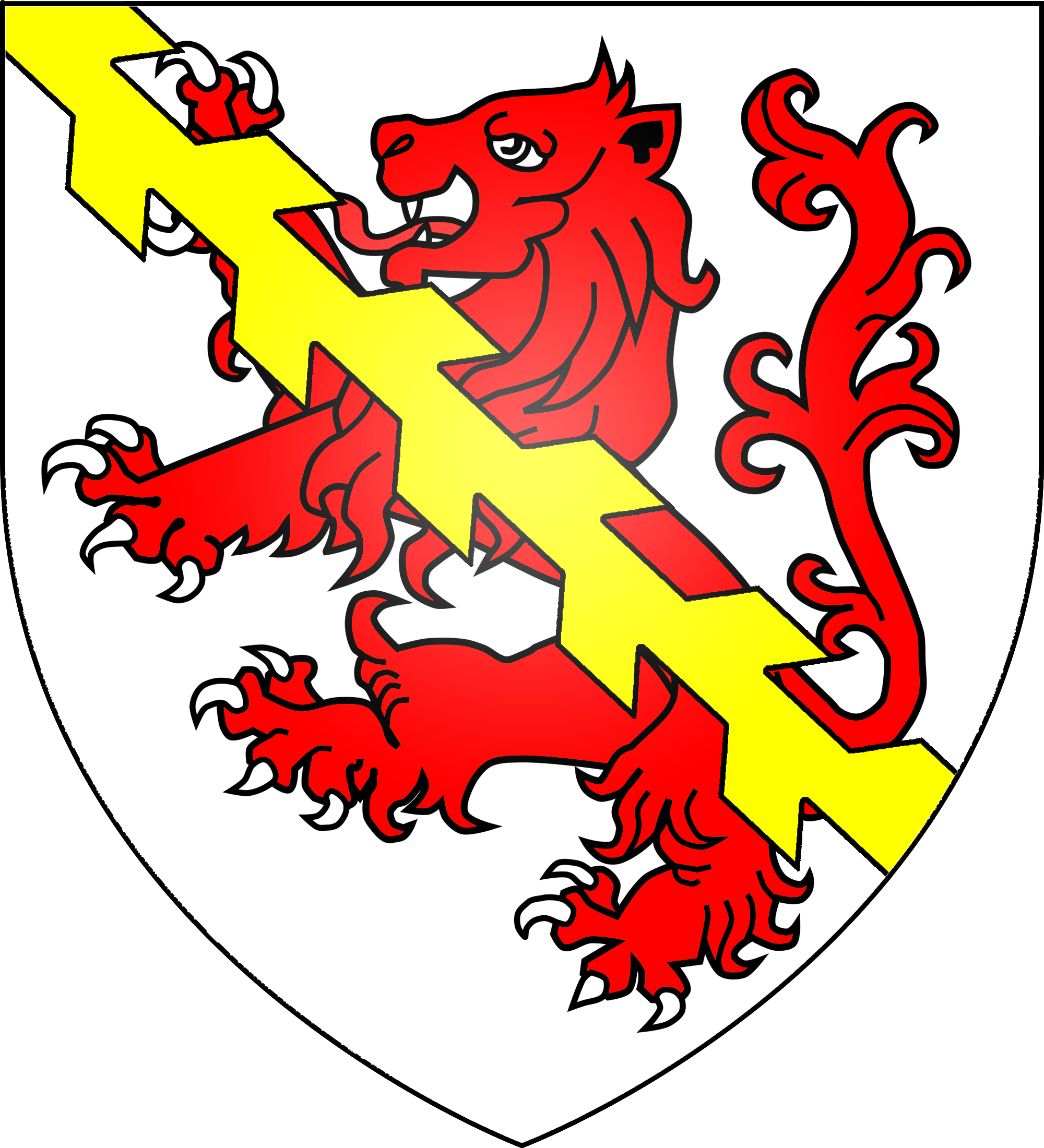
- Arms of Steward: Argent, a lion rampant gules debruised by a bend raguly or, said to have been an augmentation of honour granted to an ancestor Sir Alexander Steward "The Fierce" by King Charles VI of France
- Born: 11 February 1618
- Died: 15 February 1710 (aged 92)
- Occupation: English MP

Sir Nicholas Steward, 1st Baronet FRS (11 February 1618 – 15 February 1710) of Pylewell Park, Hampshire was an English MP and Chamberlain of the Exchequer.

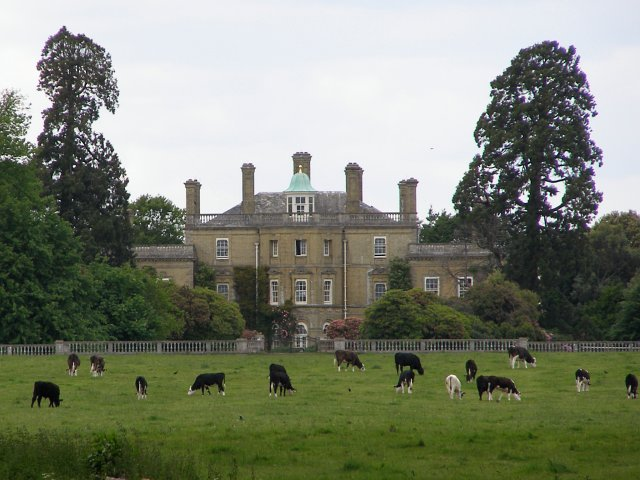
Pylewell House, Hampshire

He was born the eldest son of Simeon Steward of Hartley Mauditt, Hampshire and studied law at Lincoln's Inn.

He was fined by the Parliamentary forces for being a Royalist in 1645. After the Restoration of the Monarchy in 1660 he was created Baronet Steward of Hartley Mauditt and given the sinecure position of Chamberlain of the Exchequer until his death in 1710. He was a justice of the peace for Hampshire between 1660 and his death and a Deputy Lieutenant of Hampshire from 1673 to 1676 and 1683 to 1688.

He was elected member of parliament for Lymington in a by-election in 1663, sitting until 1679. In 1667 he was elected a Fellow of the Royal Society.

He died in 1710 and was buried in the churchyard of St Leonard's Church, Worldham. He had married Mary, the daughter of Sir Miles Sandys of Miserden, Gloucestershire, with whom he had 3 sons (who all predeceased him) and 7 daughters. He was succeeded as second baronet by his grandson Simeon, son of his youngest son Charles. The family name then became Stuart.

Parliament of England
Preceded by John Bulkeley; Sir William Lewis, 1st Baronet	Member of Parliament for Lymington; 1663–1679; With: Sir William Lewis, 1st Baronet 1663–1678; Sir Richard Knight 1678–1679	Succeeded by John Button; Bartholomew Bulkeley
Baronetage of England
New creation	Baronet (of Hartley Mauduit); 1660–1710	Succeeded by Simeon Stuart
