= Hampshire Militia =

Auxiliary force of the British Army

The Hampshire Militia was an auxiliary military force in Hampshire and the Isle of Wight in Southern England. From their formal organisation as Trained Bands in 1572 until their final service as the Special Reserve, the Militia regiments of the county served in home defence in all of Britain's major wars. They also saw active service during the Monmouth Rebellion, and supplied thousands of recruits to the fighting battalions during World War I. After 1921 the militia had only a shadowy existence until its final abolition in 1953.

== Early history ==
The English militia was descended from the Anglo-Saxon Fyrd, the military force raised from the freemen of the shires under command of their Sheriff. The universal obligation to serve continued under the Norman and Plantagenet kings and was reorganised under the Assizes of Arms of 1181 and 1252, and again by the Statute of Winchester of 1285. The able-bodied men were equipped by their parishes and arrayed by the Hundreds into which each county was divided. Those of the County of Southampton (Note: For a large part of its history Hampshire was formally known as the County of Southampton to distinguish it from Northamptonshire; today 'Southampton' refers only to the city.) and the Isle of Wight were assembled on several occasions to repel French incursions. In 1545 a French fleet entered the Solent and invaded the Isle of Wight, being opposed by the Isle of Wight and Hampshire militia at the Battle of Bonchurch and at Bembridge.

== Trained Bands ==
The legal basis of the militia was updated by two acts of 1557 covering musters (4 & 5 Ph. & M. c. 3) and the maintenance of horses and armour (4 & 5 Ph. & M. c. 2). The county militia was now under the Lord Lieutenant, assisted by the deputy lieutenants and justices of the peace (JPs). The entry into force of these acts in 1558 is seen as the starting date for the organised county militia in England. Although the militia obligation was universal, it was impractical to train and equip every able-bodied man, and from 1572 the practice was to select a proportion of men for the Trained bands (TBs) who were mustered for regular training.

When war broke out with Spain, training and equipping the militia became a priority. From 1583 counties were organised into groups for training purposes, with emphasis on the invasion-threatened 'maritime' counties including Hampshire. Different districts were made responsible for guarding certain parts of the coastline, while other villages in the west and north-west of the county were to send reinforcements to the Isle of Wight, recognised as the most likely place for an invasion. These plans were put into operation in July 1588 when the Spanish Armada was spotted off the coast and the signal beacons were lit, calling out the TBs along the south coast and across the country. The Armada was engaged by the Royal Navy in a running fight up the English Channel, and at one point it appeared that the Spanish would try to land on the Isle of Wight, but facing continued attacks and contrary winds the Armada continued up the Channel. It was finally driven away into the North Sea by fireships and bad weather and the TBs along the coast could be stood down.

With the passing of the threat of invasion, the trained bands declined in the early 17th Century. Later, King Charles I attempted to reform them into a national force or 'Perfect Militia' answering to the king rather than local control. However, when armies were assembled in 1639 and 1640 for service in Scotland in the Bishops' Wars, few of the men sent by the counties were actually trained bandsmen, and there was widespread disorder among the unwilling levies. Control of the militia was one of the major points of dispute between Charles I and Parliament that led to the First English Civil War. At the outbreak of hostilities a detachment of the Hampshire TBs served alongside Sir William Waller's Parliamentarian Southern Association Army at the Siege of Portsmouth in August 1642. However, as the war developed neither side made much further use of the TBs except as a source of recruits and weapons for their own full-time regiments. Once Parliament had established full control it passed new Militia Acts in 1648 and 1650 that replaced lords lieutenant with county commissioners appointed by Parliament or the Council of State. At the same time the term 'Trained Band' began to disappear in most counties. Under the Commonwealth and Protectorate the militia received pay when called out, and operated alongside the New Model Army to control the country.

== Restoration Militia ==
After the Restoration of the Monarchy, the English Militia was re-established by the Militia Act 1661 under the control of the king's lords-lieutenant, the men to be selected by ballot. This was popularly seen as the 'Constitutional Force' to counterbalance a 'Standing Army' tainted by association with the New Model Army that had supported Cromwell's military dictatorship, and almost the whole burden of home defence and internal security was entrusted to the militia under politically reliable local landowners. The deputy lieutenants of Hampshire had detained so many gentlemen on political or religious grounds that there was a shortage of suitable officers, leading the deputies to request that some of their number should double as Colonels of militia regiments, although this was not the government's intention. One of those deemed politically reliable was Thomas Jervoise who had been a Parliamentary Captain of Horse in 1643–6, and a commissioner and captain of militia for Hampshire in 1660; he was still commanding a Troop of horse militia in 1685.

The Hampshire Militia had been formed into six regiments by the time of the Second Dutch War in 1666 when they were called out to face the threatened French and Dutch invasion. Again, in the Third Dutch War a Hampshire regiment was sent to guard Portsmouth in 1673. The militiamen were provided with uniforms and equipment by the county: one of the regiments in 1666 was known as the White Regiment because its coats were of undyed wool. At the time of the Rye House Plot in 1683 the government demanded that dissenters' houses should be searched, and the Lord Lieutenant of Hampshire, the Earl of Gainsborough, promptly sent word to the magistrates and militia officers in the major towns to carry this out. They searched all suspects, restricted movement overseas, and arrested a Nonconformist minister. Weapons were seized, and those held by individuals for militia use were taken and stored centrally by the local authorities or at the Great Magazine in Portsmouth.

=== Monmouth's rebellion ===
In 1685 there was a rebellion against King James II. Its leader, the exiled Duke of Monmouth, landed with his supporters at Lyme Regis in Dorset on 11 June 1685. Two days before, Gainsborough had been ordered to arrest Thomas Dore, the mayor of Lymington, a known Monmouth supporter, but his men missed him. As Monmouth's rebels gathered, the government of James II responded by declaring him a traitor and calling out the militia on 13 June, while the regulars of the Royal army were assembled. Gainsborough claimed that his Hampshire Militia was ready by 14 June, but marching orders were not issued until 17 June, when it marched to secure Southampton, Portsmouth and the south coast. It also forestalled Christopher Battiscombe and Sir Francis Rolle's attempts to raise Hampshire for Monmouth

In 1685 the Hampshire Militia mustered 2500 men in five regiments of foot and 120 troopers in one regiment of horse:

- The Yellow Regiment of Andover – possibly Col Webb
- The Green Regiment of the New Forest – Col Fleming
- The Blue Regiment – possibly Col John Dean
- The Grey Regiment – possibly Col Norton
- The White Regiment
- Regiment of Horse
  - Capt Thomas Brocas's Troop
  - Capt Thomas Jervoise's Troop

(The Earl of Gainsborough, as Lord Lieutenant of Hampshire and Governor of Portsmouth, had also been colonel of a regiment of the county militia since 1678.) The mustering towns for Hampshire were Andover & Fawley, Alton, Basingstoke, New Forest, Portsdown and Winchester.

As Monmouth advanced into Somerset, the Hampshire Militia marched into Wiltshire, while the Sussex Militia arrived to secure East Dorset and Hampshire. After a false alarm on 24 June the Red Regiment of Wiltshire Militia made a hasty retreat from Bradford-on-Avon to Trowbridge, where Col John Dean's Hampshire Regiment marched to join them. By 28 June the Hampshire Yellow Regiment was camped outside Trowbridge with the Red and Blue Wiltshire Regiments. When a mistake by the Royal commander, the Earl of Feversham, gave Monmouth a fleeting chance of evading the Royal forces and marching on London, the Wiltshire and Hampshire Militia promptly occupied Westbury, thereby denying him access to the London road. They following day they rendezvoused with Feversham's army at Westbury. Feversham sent away two of the Hampshire regiments, allegedly for indiscipline (possibly also a cost-saving measure), but kept the Blue Regiment to boost his numbers. Of the other two, one was probably left to secure the Wiltshire border. On 27 June the Green Regiment of Hampshire Militia was at the Battle of Norton St Philip, and during the decisive Battle of Sedgemoor on 6 July, the regiment secured the bridge over the River Parrett at Burrowbridge.

James distrusted the militia under its county landed gentry, and after Sedgemoor he neglected it in favour of a greatly increased Regular Army. However, when William of Orange landed in the West Country in 1688 he was virtually unopposed by the army or the militia, and deposed James II in the Glorious Revolution. The militia organisation continued unchanged under William.

In 1697 the counties were required to submit detailed lists of their militia. The Militia of the County of Southampton under the Lord-Lieutenant, Charles Paulet, 1st Duke of Bolton, comprised:

- Duke of Bolton's Regiment of Foot – 6 companies, 366 men
- Marquess of Winchester's Regiment of Foot – 6 companies, 435 men
- Col Henry Compton's Regiment of Foot – 6 companies, 399 men
- 'Late Col Norton's' (Note: Possibly Col Richard Norton of Southwick Park, MP, died 1691, or his younger son, who both commanded regiments under the Duke of Bolton) Regiment of Foot – 5 companies, 376 men
- Col George Rodney Brydges' Regiment of Foot – 6 companies, 448 men
- Col Henry Dawley's Regiment of Foot – 5 companies, 440 men
- Winchester Independent Company of Foot – Capt Lord William Powlett, 150 men
- Southampton Independent Company of Foot – Capt John Smith (Note: Probably John Smith, MP for Hampshire 1698–1700.) 200 men
- Duke of Bolton's Troop of Horse – 50 men
- Capt Thomas Jervoise's Troop of Horse – 70 men

The Isle of Wight Militia under the Governor, Lord Cutts, comprised:

- East Medina Regiment – Col Lord Cutts, 8 companies, 802 men
- West Medina Regiment – Col David Urry, 8 companies, 854 men
- Independent Company at Cowes – Lieutenant Joseph Burton, 96 men

However, the militia passed into virtual abeyance during the long peace after the Treaty of Utrecht in 1713, and few units were called out during the Jacobite Risings of 1715 and 1745.

== 1757 Reforms ==
Under threat of French invasion during the Seven Years' War a series of Militia Acts from 1757 reorganised the county militia regiments, the men being conscripted by means of parish ballots (paid substitutes were permitted) to serve for three years. In peacetime they assembled for 28 days' annual training. There was a property qualification for officers, who were commissioned by the lord lieutenant. An adjutant and drill sergeants were to be provided to each regiment from the Regular Army, and arms and accoutrements would be supplied when the county had secured 60 per cent of its quota of recruits.

Hampshire was given a quota of 960 men to raise in two regiments with an independent company at Cowes on the Isle of Wight. The North Regiment was formed by 14 September 1759, when its arms were ordered to be issued, and the South Regiment by 3 October 1759. The Lord Lieutenant, Lieutenant-General Charles Powlett, 5th Duke of Bolton, commanded both regiments with the rank of Colonel ('Brigadier-General of Militia for the County of Southampton' from 13 January 1762). He commissioned Hans Stanley, Member of Parliament (MP) for Southampton as colonel of the North Regiment, while the South Regiment was under Lieutenant-Colonel Sir Thomas Worsley, 6th Baronet. The North Regiment was ordered to be embodied 15 December 1759 and this was carried out at Winchester on Christmas Day. The South Regiment was embodied at Southampton on 12 May 1760. Although mainland Hampshire had raised its militia quickly, this was not the case for the Isle of Wight: its 60-strong company was not formed until 1771 or embodied before 1778.

After serving in Hampshire, the North Hampshires moved to Bristol in 1760 to take charge of French prisoners-of-war. Later that year the regiment was in Devonshire, then went into winter quarters in Berkshire, spending most of 1761 in that county. It moved around Hampshire during 1762, often guarding prisoners. The South Hampshires also spent time guarding prisoners in Kent and in garrisoning Dover. In 1761 the regiment was part of a large militia training encampment at Winchester, and then wintered in Wiltshire. Like the North Hants, it was in Hampshire guarding prisoners for most of 1762. Both regiments were disembodied in December 1762 after a peace treaty was agreed. The regiments mustered for annual training thereafter.

=== American War of Independence ===
The American War of Independence broke out in 1775, and by 1778 Britain was threatened with invasion by the Americans' allies, France and Spain, while the bulk of the Regular Army was serving overseas. The militia were called out on 28 March, and the North Hants regiment crossed to the Isle of Wight, reinforcing the local company, which had been assembled for the first time. The South Hants regiment served in Sussex and attended the great camp at Coxheath near Maidstone. After wintering in small towns across Hampshire it moved to the Isle of Wight in 1779 to relieve the North Hants, which went to form part of the Plymouth garrison. Both regiments were stationed in London's Hyde Park at the time of the Gordon Riots. The South Hants returned to Coxheath in 1781 and afterwards was stationed in Sussex. The North Hants returned to the Isle of Wight for the rest of the war, which ended in March 1783, when the militia was disembodied.

From 1784 to 1792 the militia were assembled for their 28 days' annual peacetime training, but to save money only two-thirds of the men were actually mustered each year.

=== French Revolutionary War ===
On 5 December 1792 the 6th Duke of Bolton, as lord-lieutenant, was ordered to recall the militiamen of the county who had already been trained in May that year. Once they had assembled for a 20-day embodiment, it was changed to permanent service. Thus a portion of the militia was already under arms before Revolutionary France declared war on Britain on 1 February 1793. Recruiting parties soon brought the regiments up to strength. The North Hants was sent to join the garrison at Chatham, Kent, and that summer was at Ashdown Camp, while the South Hants was in the Portsmouth garrison at Gosport Barracks. The Isle of Wight, as always, remained on the island.

The French Revolutionary Wars saw a new phase for the English Militia: they were embodied for a whole generation, and became regiments of full-time professional soldiers (though restricted to service in the British Isles), which the Regular Army increasingly saw as a prime source of recruits. They served in coast defences, manned garrisons, guarded prisoners of war, and carried out internal security duties, while their traditional local defence duties were taken over by the Volunteers and mounted Yeomanry. In 1794 the militia was augmented by adding a company of volunteers rather than balloted men to each regiment; in this way the Isle of Wight was doubled to two companies. Over the following years the North Hants served on the Isle of Wight and then at Brighton Camp in 1794, across Sussex in 1795, at Plymouth Dock in 1796 and in Dorset in 1797. The South Hants returned from Kent to Portsmouth in 1795, and then spent the next two summers along the Sussex coast.

=== Supplementary Militia ===
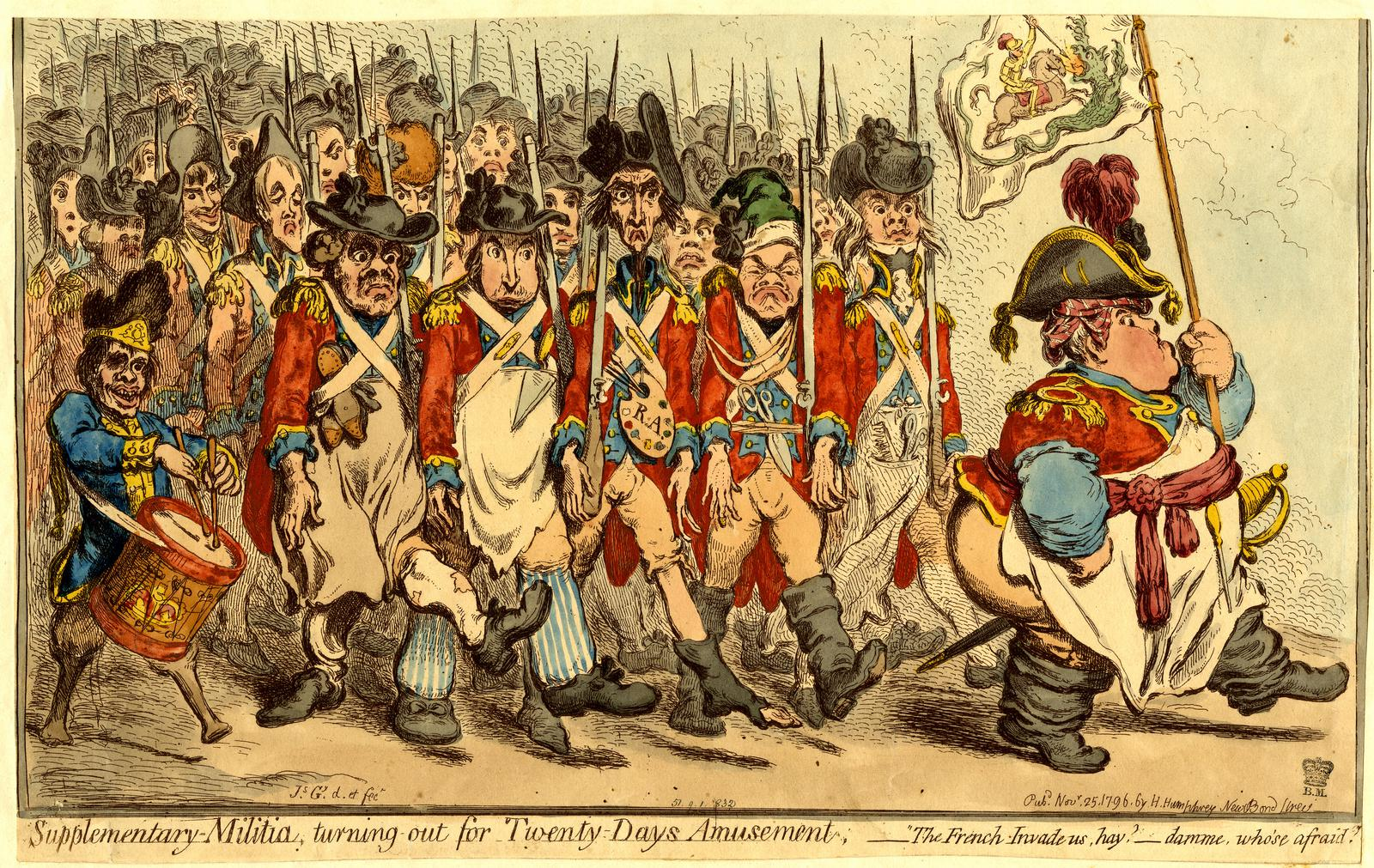
Supplementary-Militia, turning-out for Twenty Days Amusement: 1796 caricature by James Gillray.

In an attempt to have as many men as possible under arms for home defence to release Regulars for overseas service, the Government created the Supplementary Militia in 1796, a compulsory levy of men to be trained in their spare time, and to be incorporated in the Militia in emergency. Hampshire's additional quota was fixed at 847 men. The lieutenancies were required to carry out 20 days' initial training as soon as possible, and detachments from the North and South Hampshire Militia went back to their home districts to carry this out. The Supplementaries were called out in 1798 and those in Hampshire were added to the existing regiments, bringing them up to a total of 1955 men. The North and South each added two companies to their establishment, and it was proposed (but never carried out) to split them both into two battalions, each of 8 companies of 122 men. At the same time the Isle of Wight Militia increased to 3 companies. The supplementaries assigned to the North Hants joined the regiment at Gosport as it embarked to join the Isle of Wight garrison. The South Hants marched to Winchester to incorporate its supplementaries and then went into the Portsmouth Garrison.

In the summer of 1798 the Irish Rebellion became serious, and the French were sending help to the rebels. An Act was passed allowing the English Militia to volunteer for service in Ireland. Two companies of the Isle of Wight Militia offered to serve there but their offer was not accepted since it would denude the island when a cross-Channel invasion was still possible. The North Hants was, however, allowed to leave the island, and embarked at Cowes for Ireland. However, due to contrary winds and gales they were still there after five weeks, by which time the rebellion had been quelled. The regiment finally disembarked at Lymington, where it went into winter quarters.

The threat of invasion seemed to have receded and the Supplementary Militia was stood down in July. However, great efforts were made in 1799 to induce militiamen to volunteer for the regular army, and the numbers with the regiments soon fell, the establishment for Hampshire and the Isle of Wight being reduced to just 638 men. By 1800 some of the supplementaries had to be recalled to keep them up to strength. The North Hants served on the Isle of Wight again in 1799, then guarded prisoners-of-war in Devonshire in 1800–01, the South Hants followed then to the Isle of Wight and then served in Cornwall. The Treaty of Amiens was signed in March 1802, ending the war, and the regiments were disembodied in April.

=== Napoleonic Wars ===
The Peace of Amiens was short-lived and the government began recalling the militia in November 1802, the North Hants being embodied on 29 November. The South Hants and Isle of Wight regiments completed their embodiment on 24–25 March 1803. Britain declared war on France once more on 18 May 1803. The North and South Hants regiments were stationed in Sussex.

During the summer of 1805, when Napoleon was massing his 'Army of England' at Boulogne for a projected invasion, the North Hants marched to Portsmouth Barracks, where it formed part of the Portsmouth Garrison under Maj-Gen John Hope, the South Hants was at Lewes Barracks in Maj-Gen William Houston's Brigade, and the Isle of Wight (referred to as the 3rd Hampshire) at Grange Chine Barracks in Maj-Gen John Whitelocke's Brigade. By now volunteering for the regulars had so reduced the Hampshire militia regiments (particularly the South regiment) that the Lord Lieutenant, Lord Bolton, proposed combining them into a single regiment, but nothing came of this.

The North Hants remained at Portsmouth until September 1807, when it moved to Plymouth. In the summer of 1809 it was at Exeter, then moved to Bristol the following year and remained there until 1811. The South Hants moved around various locations in Sussex and then wintered on the Isle of Wight in 1806–07, before serving in Dorset and then Sussex again. In 1809 it moved to Devon and guarded prisoners of war (including those building Dartmoor Prison) until 1811.

In 1807 the commanding officer of the South Hants had offered his regiment for conversion into a rifle corps, on the grounds that many of the men were from the New Forest and the Forest of Bere and were expert marksmen. Nothing came of his proposal then, but on 20 June 1811 orders were issued for the regiment to become the South Hampshire Light Infantry.

=== Hampshire Local Militia ===
While the Regular Militia were the mainstay of national defence during the Napoleonic Wars, they were supplemented from 1808 by the Local Militia, which were part-time and only to be used within their own districts. These were raised to counter the declining numbers of Volunteers, and if their ranks could not be filled voluntarily the militia ballot was employed.

The following Volunteer companies offered to transfer to the new force:

- Romsey
- Eling & Millbrook under Lt-Col Peter Serle, later also Lt-Col of the South Hants Militia
- Lymington, Boldre & Milford
- Alverstoke Riflemen
- Christchurch
- Prince of Wales's New Forest Rangers
- The Easton & Arrington Company from the Alresford Volunteers
- Nutshalling
- Ringwood

The Hampshire Local Militia was established in September 1808 and divided into two regiments in January 1809:

- South-West Hampshire Local Militia – based at Romsey, it was commanded by the future Prime Minister Lord Palmerston, who was Secretary at War from 1809 onwards. The second-inc-command was Lt-Col E.P. Buckley, and the majors were William Stewart Rose, MP, previously Maj-Commandant of the New Forest Rangers, and George Compton, who had been major in the Eling & Milbrook Volunteers.
- South-East Hampshire Local Militia – based at Lymington and commanded by Lt-Col Commandant John Abel Walter, previously major in the Lymington, Boldre & Milford Volunteers; his second-in-command was Lt-Col Thomas Thistlethwaite, formerly Lt-Col Cmndt of the Portsdown (or South East Hants) Cavalry. On the death of Lt-Col Walter in 1812, Charles Hulse, formerly captain of the Fordingbridge Yeomanry Cavalry, was promoted to succeed him.

The Hampshire Local Militia trained for two weeks each year from 1809 to 1813, usually in May. In February 1814 the regiments assembled for the last time, to encourage the men to volunteer for the Regular Army, and both regiments were disbanded on 24 April 1816.

=== Ireland and Scotland ===
Until now the Hampshire Militia had never served outside Southern England. That changed in 1811, when the Interchange Act was passed in July to allow English militia regiments to volunteer for two years' service in Ireland. The North Hampshires did so, and at the end of August the regiment sailed from Bristol to Dublin, and was stationed at Strabane for its period of service in Ireland. In May 1813 it returned across the Irish Sea to Scotland, where it was quartered at Haddington until November, when it marched back to Portsmouth. The South Hants Light Infantry was rushed north by hired carts in 1812 as part of a militia concentration in response to the Luddite riots. It served in Yorkshire and Lancashire and then in April 1813 the regiment was also ordered to Scotland, where it was housed at Dunbar Barracks for the next year. Early in 1814 the South Hants moved to Musselburgh Barracks, where the duties included guarding Penicuik Prison. While the regiment was at Musselburgh news arrived that Napoleon had abdicated and the war was over. The South Hampshire Light Infantry sailed from Leith to Gravesend before marching to Portsmouth to be disembodied on 16 July 1814. The North Hampshire Militia marched from Portsmouth to Winchester where they were paid off on 18 July.

However, Napoleon returned from exile in 1815, initiating the Hundred Days campaign. The Hampshire Militia was re-embodied in June and July (just after the decisive Battle of Waterloo was fought). The South Hants LI was quartered at Gosport Old Barracks and on 6 December it embarked for service in Ireland. However, bad weather prevented the ships from sailing and it disembarked next day. The warrant for disembodying the regiment was received on 15 January 1816, and this was carried out on 1 February. The North Hants remained quartered at Winchester until 1 February when it was also disembodied.

=== Long Peace ===
After Waterloo there was another long peace. Although officers continued to be commissioned into the militia and ballots were occasionally held, the regiments were rarely assembled for training: the Hampshire Militia regiments were embodied in 1820, 1821 and 1825, but not again until 1831, and never thereafter. The permanent staffs of sergeants and drummers (who were occasionally used to maintain public order) were progressively reduced. In 1845–46 there was an effort to replace elderly members of the permanent staff and to appoint a few younger officers from the county gentry, though they had no duties to perform. The Isle of Wight Militia had long claimed to be Light Infantry, and this was accepted in 1846.

== 1852 Reforms ==
The Militia of the United Kingdom was revived by the Militia Act 1852, enacted during a renewed period of international tension. As before, units were raised and administered on a county basis, and filled by voluntary enlistment (although conscription by means of the Militia Ballot might be used if the counties failed to meet their quotas). Training was for 56 days on enlistment, then for 21–28 days per year, during which the men received full army pay. Under the act, Militia units could be embodied by royal proclamation for full-time home defence service in three circumstances:

1. 'Whenever a state of war exists between Her Majesty and any foreign power'.
2. 'In all cases of invasion or upon imminent danger thereof'.
3. 'In all cases of rebellion or insurrection'.

The North and South Hampshire and Isle of Wight units were reformed in 1852 and carried out their first training at the beginning of 1853. The Militia Act 1852 had introduced Artillery Militia units in addition to the traditional infantry regiments. The Isle of Wight Light Infantry Militia was converted into Artillery Militia in April 1853 and the government decided to form another regiment on the Hampshire mainland to guard the approaches to Portsmouth. On 27 December 1853 the South Hampshire Light Infantry Militia merged with North Hampshire Militia (henceforth simply the 'Hampshire Militia'), while a large number of men transferred from the South Hants to form the new Hampshire Militia Artillery.

=== Artillery Militia ===
The role of the new Artillery Militia units was to man coastal defences and fortifications, relieving the Royal Artillery (RA) for active service. The Isle of Wight Artillery Militia consisted of two, later three, companies at Newport, and the Hampshire Militia Artillery had eight companies at Portsmouth. Their wartime role was to man the existing defences and new 'Palmerston Forts' of the Isle of Wight and Gosport as part of the wider defence scheme for Portsmouth. Annual training was carried out on the heavy guns at these forts and batteries, though both units also had some light cannon for field days.

=== Crimean War and Indian Mutiny ===
War having broken out with Russia in 1854 and an expeditionary force sent to the Crimea, the militia began to be embodied for home defence. The Hampshire Militia was one of the first infantry units called out, on 29 May 1854, though its assembly was delayed until 1 August when sufficient accommodation was available at Haslar Barracks and Fort Monckton, Gosport. The Hampshire Militia Artillery followed on 7 December, and the Isle of Wight on 1 February 1855, both serving in the forts around the Solent. After the war ended all the militia were disembodied in June 1856.

The Hants Militia Artillery also called out on 10 October 1858 when much of the Regular Army was away during the Indian Mutiny. It serving at Devonport, Pendennis Castle and Pembroke Dock during the embodiment, which ended in December 1860.

Thereafter the militia regiments were called out for their annual training, usually at a season when farm labourers (who made up the bulk of the infantry militia) could be spared from their work. The Isle of Wight artillery was increased to three companies in 1859 and four in 1863. The regiments produced large numbers of volunteers for the regulars each year. In 1867 the Militia Reserve was introduced, consisting of present and former militiamen who undertook to serve with the regulars in case of war. They were called out in April 1878 during the international crisis following the Russo-Turkish War.

== Cardwell reforms ==
Under the 'Localisation of the Forces' scheme introduced by the Cardwell Reforms of 1872, infantry Militia regiments were brigaded with their local Regular and Volunteer battalions. Sub-District No 40 (County of Hampshire) comprised:

- 37th (North Hampshire) Regiment of Foot
- 67th (South Hampshire) Regiment of Foot
- Hampshire Militia at Winchester
- 2nd Hampshire Militia – to be formed
- 1st Administrative Battalion, Hampshire Rifle Volunteer Corps at Winchester
- 2nd Administrative Battalion, Hampshire Rifle Volunteer Corps at Portsmouth
- 4th Administrative Battalion, Hampshire Rifle Volunteer Corps at Southampton
- 1st Administrative Battalion, Isle of Wight Rifle Volunteer Corps at Newport
- No 40 Brigade Depot at Fort Elson, Gosport, pending a move to a permanent depot at Lower Barracks, Winchester

The plan had been for each pair of linked regular regiments to have two militia battalions associated with it, and the intention was to raise a second battalion for the Hampshire Militia, but this was never done. Following the Cardwell Reforms a mobilisation scheme began to appear in the Army List from December 1875. This assigned places in an order of battle to Militia units serving in an 'Active Army' and a 'Garrison Army'. The Hampshire Militia's assigned war station was with the Garrison Army in the Portsmouth defences.

=== 3rd (Hampshire Militia) Battalion, Hampshire Regiment ===
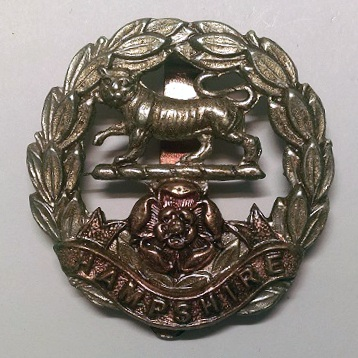
Cap badge of the Hampshire Regiment.

The Childers Reforms of 1881 completed the Cardwell process by converting the Regular regiments into county regiments and incorporating the militia battalions into them. The 37th and 67th Foot became the Hampshire Regiment on 1 July 1881 with the following organisation:

- 1st and 2nd Battalions, Hampshire Regiment
- 3rd (Hampshire Militia) Battalion, Hampshire Regiment
- 4th (Militia) Battalion – never formed
- 1st–5th Volunteer Battalions, Hampshire Regiment

The 3rd Battalion continued to carry out its annual training each year.

=== Duke of Connaught's Own Artillery ===
The Royal Artillery and Militia Artillery were reorganised on 14 April 1882, when 11 territorial divisions of garrison artillery were formed, each consisting of a number of brigades. (Note: In contemporary Royal Artillery terminology, a 'brigade' was a group of batteries brigaded together for administrative rather than tactical purposes, the officer in command normally being a lieutenant-colonel rather than a brigadier-general or major-general, the ranks usually associated with command of an infantry or cavalry brigade.) In each division the 1st Brigade was composed of Regular RA batteries, the others being a varying number of militia corps. The Hampshire and Isle of Wight units joined the Southern Division, becoming 2nd and 3rd Brigade, Southern Division, RA. In 1886 the Isle of Wight's title was changed to 3rd (Duke of Connaught's Own) Brigade, Southern Division, the Duke of Connaught having been the unit's Honorary Colonel since 1875.

The 2nd Brigade (the Hants Artillery) was one of only a handful of militia units called out for duty during the Panjdeh Crisis in 1885, when it manned the forts around Gosport from February until the end of September.

By 1889 the militia artillery was finding difficulty in obtaining enough recruits, and the Hampshire Brigade was permitted to recruit outside Hampshire in the other counties of the Southern Division (Wiltshire and Dorset). But this was not enough, and in 1891 the Hampshire and Isle of Wight Brigades were amalgamated as the Duke of Connaught's Own Hampshire and Isle of Wight Artillery, consisting of four companies based at Sandown, Isle of Wight. From 1899 the militia artillery formally became part of the Royal Garrison Artillery (RGA), and when the RGA abolished the divisional structure the unit took the title of Duke of Connaught's Own Hampshire and Isle of Wight RGA (Militia) on 1 January 1902.

=== Hampshire Submarine Miners ===
The Submarine Mining Service had been founded in 1871 as a branch of the Royal Engineers (RE) with the task of installing and maintaining fixed minefields to defend seaports. This role became a serious drain on the Regular RE's resources, and could readily be carried out by militia units. The first such militia unit was formed in 1878 as the Hampshire Engineers (Submarine Miners) at Gosport, under the command of Capt Francis John Webber, formerly a lieutenant in the 21st Foot. During 1884 the unit was expanded into the Southern Division Submarine Mining Militia of four companies:

- 1st (Hampshire) Submarine Mining Company – Gosport
- 2nd (Hampshire) Submarine Mining Company – Gosport
- 3rd (Devonshire) Submarine Mining Company – Plymouth
- 4th (Kent) Submarine Mining Company – Chatham

Each SM company was commanded by a captain, with Capt Webber of 1st Company listed as captain commandant.

A high level committee on RE manpower in 1885–6 recommended a rapid expansion of the SM service, including the Militia. The Southern Division was split into separate Portsmouth, Plymouth, and Thames & Medway Divisions in 1888, and the Portsmouth Division itself was divided into the Portsmouth and Needles Divisions in 1893, the latter establishing its headquarters at Fort Victoria, Isle of Wight.

==== Commmanders ====
The following officers commanded the SM units:

Southern Division

- Capt Francis John Webber from formation; promoted to major 1 April 1887

Portsmouth Division

- Maj T.E.A. Jones, appointed 25 February 1888
- Maj (hon Lt-Col) William Hawley, promoted 15 August 1906

Needles Division

- Maj Leonard Norman Barrow, appointed 19 August 1893
- Maj (hon Lt-Col) A.F.W.H. Somerset-Leeke, promoted 26 September 1903

=== Second Boer War ===
With the bulk of the Regular Army serving in South Africa during the Second Boer War, the Militia were called out for home defence. The 3rd Battalion was embodied from January to December 1900.

The Duke of Connaught's Artillery was embodied for garrison duty from 1 May to 6 November 1900. In addition, the unit volunteered for overseas service, and this offer was accepted. It formed a service company of 5 officers and 149 other ranks that went to South Africa where it was brigaded with the service company formed by the Prince of Wales's Own Norfolk Artillery. The two companies provided gun detachments for several forts and garrisoned towns. They returned to the UK after peace was declared in May 1902, the Duke of Connaught's having lost four gunners died of wounds or disease.

The SM Militia were also mobilised to release Regular RE personnel for field service. The Portsmouth and Needles Divisions were embodied from 14 April 1900 to October–November that year.

== Special Reserve ==
After the Boer War, the future of the Militia was called into question. There were moves to reform the Auxiliary Forces (Militia, Yeomanry and Volunteers) to take their place in the six Army Corps proposed by St John Brodrick as Secretary of State for War. However, little of Brodrick's scheme was carried out. The Submarine Mining service was disbanded on 1 April 1907 and the militia units disbanded.

Under the sweeping Haldane Reforms of 1908, the Militia was replaced by the Special Reserve, a semi-professional force whose role was to provide reinforcement drafts for Regular units serving overseas in wartime. Although the majority of the officers and men of the RGA (M) accepted transfer to the Special Reserve Royal Field Artillery, and the Sandown unit became the Duke of Connaught's Own Hampshire and Isle of Wight Royal Field Reserve Artillery on 24 May 1908, all these units were disbanded in March 1909.

The 3rd (Hampshire Militia) Battalion, Hampshire Regiment transferred to the SR as the 3rd (Reserve) Battalion on 21 June 1908.

=== World War I ===
On the outbreak of war on 4 August 1914 the 3rd (R) Bn Hampshire Regiment was embodied at Winchester and went to its war station at Parkhurst, Isle of Wight. In January 1915 it moved to Gosport, where it spent the rest of the war as part of the Portsmouth Garrison, carrying out its dual roles of coast defence and training reinforcement drafts for the battalions of the Hampshire Regiment serving overseas. It also formed the 13th (Reserve) Battalion.

=== Postwar ===
The SR resumed its old title of Militia in 1921 but like most militia units the 3rd Hampshire remained in abeyance after World War I. By the outbreak of World War II in 1939, the only officer still listed for the battalion was the Hon Colonel, the Earl of Selborne. The Militia was formally disbanded in April 1953.

== Heritage & Ceremonial ==
=== Uniforms & Insignia ===
Although the White Regiment of the later 17th Century derived its name from its undyed woollen coats, it is not clear whether the others (Yellow, Blue, Green and Grey) were named after their coats or their Regimental colours (flags). When the militia was revived in 1757 the standard British Army red coat was used, distinguished by black facings, the South Hants later changing to yellow; the Isle of Wight also wore yellow. The Supplementary Militia wore black or yellow facings according to which regiment they were attached. The combined Hampshire Militia adopted black facings in 1853. In 1881 all battalions of the Hampshire Regiment adopted the standard white facings of English county regiments. In 1904 they regained the yellow facings worn by both the 37th and 67th Foot before 1881.

The traditional badge of Hampshire is a rose, granted according to legend by King Henry V before he departed on the Agincourt campaign. The North Hampshire Militia adopted the rose, which was displayed on the regiment's early buttons. A red rose was confirmed as the badge of the amalgamated militia regiment in 1860. The badge of the Hampshire Regiment from 1881 incorporated a rose (representing both the Hampshire rose worn by the county militia and the Minden Rose of the 37th Foot) and the Royal Tiger awarded to the 67th Foot for service in India. The Isle of Wight Militia's badge had been a tower within a circle bearing the unit's name.

The Artillery Militia adopted the blue uniform and red facings of the Royal Artillery, but with silver lace and badges instead of gilt.

=== Precedence ===
In the Seven Years' War, militia regiments camped together took precedence according to the order in which they had arrived. During the War of American Independence, the counties were given an order of precedence determined by ballot each year. For Hampshire and the Isle of Wight the positions were:

- 1st on 1 June 1778
- 42nd on12 May 1779
- 3rd on 6 May 1780
- 10th on 28 April 1781
- 15th on 7 May 1782

The militia order of precedence balloted for in 1793 (Hampshire was 6th) remained in force throughout the French Revolutionary War. Another ballot for precedence took place at the start of the Napoleonic War, when Hampshire and the Isle of Wight were 15th. This order continued until 1833. In that year the King drew the lots for individual regiments. The regiments raised before the peace of 1763 took the first 47 places: the North Hampshire was 13th, the South Hampshire 43rd, and the Isle of Wight (formed after 1763) was 63rd. In 1855, with a number of new units and others converted into artillery, the list was revised: the combined North and South Hampshires was considered a new unit and given the precedence of 122nd, despite the protestations of the regiment.

When the militia artillery corps were first formed in 1853 they were assigned an order of precedence based on alphabetical order: Hampshire and the Isle of Wight were 16th and 17th respectively. When the two units amalgamated, they took the precedence of 17th (even though the 16th place remained vacant).

=== Memorials ===
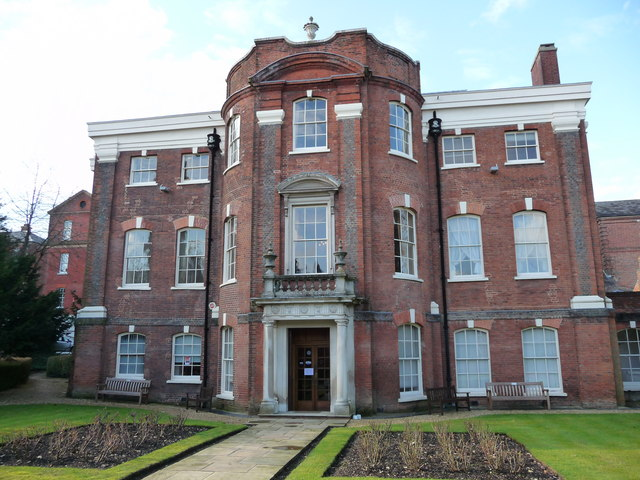
Serle's House, now The Royal Hampshire Regiment Museum.

Colonel Peter Serle sold his house on Southgate Street in Winchester to the government in 1796. Serle's House became the headquarters first of his Eling and Millbrook Volunteers and then of the South Hampshire Militia when he commanded that regiment. During the 19th Century it was used as a judge's lodgings and then as the Lower Barracks were developed in that part of the city it served as the barrackmaster's residence, officers' married quarters and the officers' mess. In 1881 it became the headquarters (HQ) of the 3rd (Hampshire Militia) Battalion, Hampshire Regiment and of the 37th Regimental district, and later the Regimental HQ of the Hampshire Regiment. It is now in use as the Royal Hampshire Regiment Museum and Memorial Garden.

== See also ==
- Militia (English)
- Militia (Great Britain)
- Militia (United Kingdom)
- Hampshire Trained Bands
- North Hampshire Militia
- South Hampshire Light Infantry Militia
- Isle of Wight Militia
- Hampshire Militia Artillery
- Duke of Connaught's Own Hampshire and Isle of Wight Artillery
- Royal Hampshire Regiment
