= Richard Blount (MP for Lymington) =

English Member of Parliament

Richard Blount (died 1628), of Dedisham, Sussex, was an English Member of Parliament (MP).

He was a Member of the Parliament of England for Lymington in 1593.

Parliament of England
Preceded by Francis Keilway; William White	Member of Parliament for Lymington; 1593; With: John Knight	Succeeded by Thomas West; Henry Wallop
