= William White (MP for Lymington) =

English Member of Parliament

William White (February 1549- 1594), of Christchurch and Moyles Court, Hampshire, was an English Member of Parliament (MP).

He was a Member of the Parliament of England for Lymington in 1589.

Parliament of England
Preceded by Francis Keilway; William Wallop	Member of Parliament for Lymington; 1589; With: Francis Keilway	Succeeded by Richard Blount; John Knight
