= Joseph Palmer (writer) =

English writer

- Born: 1756
- Died: 4 September 1815 (aged 58–59); Eastbourne, Sussex, England
- Occupation: Writer

Joseph Palmer, formerly Joseph Budworth, (1756 – 4 September 1815) was an English writer. He took the name Palmer in 1812.

== Early life ==
Palmer was born in 1756 in Manchester, He was a nephew of the Rev. William Budworth, master of Brewood School, Staffordshire, and son of Joseph Budworth, originally of Coventry, the landlord of the Palace Inn. He was admitted to the Manchester Grammar School in 1769.

== Career ==
=== Military ===
At an early age he joined the 72nd regiment, or royal Manchester volunteers. He was promoted to the rank of lieutenant, and proceeded with the regiment to Gibraltar. In the course of the siege of that fortress by the combined forces of France and Spain, he was severely wounded. He returned home with his regiment in 1783, and accepted a cadetship in the Bengal artillery, though he did not long remain in India. Subsequently, he retired from the service; but in the war occasioned by the French revolution, he volunteered as a captain in the North Hampshire militia.

He was elected a fellow of the Society of Antiquaries on 4 June 1795 (Gough, Chronological List, p. 58).

=== Writer ===
Palmer wrote much in the Gentleman's Magazine, under the signature 'Rambler.' His works are:

- 'A Fortnight's Ramble to the Lakes in Westmoreland, Lancashire, and Cumberland. By a Rambler,' London, 1792, 8vo; 2nd edit. 1795; 3rd edit. 1810; dedicated to William Noble, banker. To the latter edition were added 'A Re-visit to Buttermere, January 1795,' and 'Half-pay.' Many interesting anecdotes of the siege of Gibraltar, including particulars of his own military services, occur in pp. 358–82.
- 'Half-pay [a poem]. Written at Gibraltar on a very stormy evening, with the melancholy prospect of going upon Half-pay,' 1794; dedicated to Colonel Hans Sloane, MP.
- 'The Lancashire Collier-Girl. A true Story,' in 'Gentleman's Magazine,' 1795, pt. i. p. 197. This tale was widely disseminated by the Society for Circulating Serious Tracts among the Poor, but with some alterations not approved by the author.
- 'The Siege of Gibraltar: a Poem,' London, 1795, 4to.
- 'A View of the Village of Hampton from Moulsey Hurst. With the original "Lancashire Collier-Girl,"' London, 1797, 12mo.
- 'Windermere: a Poem,' London, 1798, 8vo.
- A memoir of his father, the Rev. William Budworth, and an account of an interesting conversation between Bishop Hurd and himself, are in John Nichols's 'Literary Anecdotes,' vol. iii.

== Personal life ==
Shortly after leaving the army he married Elizabeth Palmer on 29 March 1787 in St James, Westminster, London. She was born c.1757, the daughter of Francis Palmer of Palmerstown, Co. Mayo, who had married Elizabeth Echlin in 1747 and lived in Rush House, near Dublin; her brother Roger Palmer died unmarried in 1811 and bequeathed 'May Money' to the area.

On the decease of her brother in 1811 she inherited the estates and name of Palmer. A son, William Bellingham, was born in 1789 and a daughter, Emma Mary, in 1791 in Dublin. They later lived at Mole Lodge, West Molesey, Surrey. Emma Mary, his daughter and sole heiress, "who was a great beauty and an even greater heiress" married W. A. Mackinnon, of Newtown Park, MP for Lymington. She died on 15 November 1835, aged 43 (Gent. Mag. 1835, pt. ii. p. 663).

Palmer died at Eastbourne, Sussex, on 4 September 1815, and was buried on the 14th in the churchyard of St Peters Church, West Molesey, to which parish he had been a liberal benefactor. The church clock was given by his widow in 1815 and a school, now the NHS Joseph Palmer Centre, named for him.

Elizabeth tragically died when her dress caught fire at Ormeley Lodge, Ham Common on 31 May 1832. She was buried in the family vault at St Peter's Church, West Molesey, after a grand funeral at the Chapel Royal, Hampton Court. This was well attended because she was known to be a generous local benefactor as well as donating to the poor on her estates in County Mayo in the 1820s and 1830s.

Her daughter unsuccessfully contested her mother's will "on the ground that they were procured by undue influence and importunity" by Mr Sharp. Mrs Palmer left copyhold property worth £17,000 (equivalent to £2.1 million or US$2.68 million in 2024), personal property worth £200,000 (equivalent to £24.71 million or US$31.58 million in 2024) and £38,000 in Ireland. She left the bulk of her property to Mr Sharp, who as well as being her husband's nephew was also agent managing her estates in Ireland, in trust for her son and Francis, her brother, who were both described as "imbecile in mind"; they both already had incomes worth £5,000 and £8,000 respectively. On their deaths the remaining residue to be held in trust by Mr Sharp for her daughter and then divided between her children. Mr Sharp received a legacy of £10,000 and £5,400 in trust for Mrs Mackinnon. The estates in Ireland passed to another Palmer relative. Mrs Palmer's son died in 1853; Ormeley Lodge and Mole Lodge were sold in 1854.

== Sources ==
This article incorporates text from a publication now in the public domain: Cooper, Thompson (1895). "Palmer, Joseph". In Lee, Sidney (ed.). Dictionary of National Biography. Vol. 43. London: Smith, Elder & Co.
