= John Stewart (Camelford MP) =

English politician

Member of the British Parliament for Camelford
- In office 1819

Personal details
- Born: c. 1755
- Died: 1826
- Children: John Stewart

John Stewart (c. 1755 – 1826), of 3D, The Albany, Piccadilly, Westminster, Middlesex, was an English politician.

He was a Member (MP) of the Parliament of the United Kingdom for Camelford from 17 April 1819 to 16 June 1819 but was unseated and disqualified for bribery and corruption.

His son was John Stewart who became member of Parliament for Lymington.
