= Sir John Rivett-Carnac, 2nd Baronet =

British politician

Sir John Rivett-Carnac, 2nd Baronet (10 August 1818 – 4 August 1883) was a member of the baronetage of the United Kingdom. He succeeded his father, Sir James Rivett-Carnac, 1st Baronet in 1846. He represented Lymington in the House of Commons as a Conservative from 1852 to 1860.

== Personal background ==
John Rivett-Carnac was born on 10 August 1818. He was the son of Sir James Rivett-Carnac, 1st Baronet, and Anna Maria Richardes. He married Anne Jane Sproule on 19 December 1840. Together, they had five children, including Maria Eliza Sproule Rivett-Carnac, Frances Henrietta Rivett-Carnac, Caroline Ann Emma Rivett-Carnac, Sir James Henry Sproule Rivett-Carnac, 3rd Baronet, and John Louis Rivett-Carnac.

== Military service ==
Rivett-Carnac served as a captain in the Army of the 73rd Regiment.

Parliament of the United Kingdom
Preceded by Edward John Hutchins; William Mackinnon (elder)	Member of Parliament for Lymington; 1852–1860; With: Edward John Hutchins to 1857; William Mackinnon (younger) from 1857	Succeeded by William Mackinnon (younger); Lord George Gordon-Lennox
Baronetage of the United Kingdom
Preceded by James Rivett-Carnac	Baronet (of Derby); 1846–1883	Succeeded by James Rivett-Carnac
