= William Alexander Mackinnon (Lymington MP) =

British Member of Parliament

- Born: 4 October 1813; Marylebone, London, England
- Died: 14 September 1903 (aged 90); Folkestone, Kent, England
- Known for: Member of Parliament
- Father: William Alexander Mackinnon

William Alexander Mackinnon DL JP (1813 – 14 September 1903) was elected the Whig MP for Rye on 10 July 1852 but the result was declared void as a result of "treating". There was a question of £220 left behind a sofa cushion at the Red Lion to pay for a dinner. At the resulting bye-election the seat was taken by his father William Alexander MacKinnon. At the next election he was elected MP for Lymington which he held until 1868 but he never spoke in parliament. He was the 34th Chief of the Clan Mackinnon. He was educated at St John's College, Cambridge.

== Personal life ==
He was born on 4 October 1813 at Portman Square. He married Miss Willes on 25 April 1846. Mackinnon died aged 90 at his home Acrise Place near Folkestone, Kent.

Parliament of the United Kingdom
Preceded by Herbert Mascall Curteis	Member of Parliament for Rye; 1852 – 1853	Succeeded by William Alexander Mackinnon (father)
Preceded by Sir John Rivett-Carnac, Bt; Edward John Hutchins	Member of Parliament for Lymington; 1857 – 1868; With: Sir John Rivett-Carnac, Bt to 1860; Lord George Gordon-Lennox from 1860	Succeeded by Lord George Gordon-Lennox
