= John Kingston (MP for Lymington) =

John Kingston (1736–1820) was an Irish wine merchant in Porto and London, and Member of Parliament for Lymington from 1802 to 1814.

Lymington was a two-member close borough controlled by Sir Harry Burrard. When Burrard stepped down in December 1802, Kingston took over his seat without a contest. After Burrard died in 1813, the constituency fell into the hands of his brother George. Kingston gave up the seat in 1814.

Kingston was an abolitionist. He joined the Sierra Leone Company in 1791, as one of its early directors. He was the owner of Claremont plantation in British Guiana.
