= John Stewart (Lymington MP) =

British Conservative and Tory politician and pro-slavery lobbyist

Member of Parliament for Lymington
- In office 12 December 1832 – 31 July 1847 Serving with William Alexander Mackinnon (1835–1847); Harry Burrard-Neale (1832–1835)
- Preceded by: William Alexander Mackinnon; George Burrard
- Succeeded by: William Alexander Mackinnon; George Keppel

Personal details
- Born: 1789
- Died: 14 March 1860 (aged 70–71) London, England
- Party: Conservative/Tory
- Spouses: Elizabeth Vincent; Phoebe Rossiter (m. 1848)
- Parent: John Stewart

John Stewart (1789 – 14 March 1860) was a British Conservative and Tory politician.

He was one of the first mixed-race Member of Parliament (MP) of the Parliament of the United Kingdom.

== Family ==
Stewart was an illegitimate son of former Camelford Tory MP John Stewart (1754/5–1826) and Mary Duncan, who was Black. Upon his father's death, he took ownership of plantations in Grenada and Demerara, as well as the family home in Albany, London. However, by 1830, he was living in Wellington Street, Westminster, with his wife, Elizabeth, née Vincent, and son William Duncan Stewart (born April 1829). On 14 December 1848, Stewart remarried to Phoebe Rossiter, daughter of Joseph Rossiter.

== Business career ==
After the abolition of slavery in 1833, Stewart was compensated £22,486 for the Demerara plantation in British Guiana, where 433 were enslaved. He retained possession of this estate, as well as Stewartville, also in British Guiana, and purchased a further estate in the region in 1839, importing some labour from Madeira to Annandale. Also, a trustee of the Hope Vale estate in Grenada, in 1836 he claimed to have owned the "largest slave state" in Antigua between 1824 and 1826.

By the 1850s, he was well-established in the City of London, having become a director of the British West India Company in 1846, a member of the provisional committee of the Demerara Railway Company in the same year, a director of the London and Westminster Joint Stock Bank; and deputy chairman of the Universal Life Assurance Society.

== Member of Parliament ==
Stewart became one of parliament's first mixed-race MPs when he was elected Tory MP for Lymington at the 1832 general election. During this election, he defended his record as a slave owner and rebuffed arguments that slaves on his Demerara estates were subject to cruelty. After his election, he presented a petition to the Commons against the abolition of slavery, and often spoke in defence of West Indian plantation owners, sharing concerns over apprenticeships and sugar duties with other MPs with West Indian interests.

Becoming a Conservative MP in 1834, Stewart then went on to oppose Sir George Strickland, 7th Baronet's motion that apprenticeships should be abolished on 1 August 1838, and in 1833 and the 1840s, he opposed the reduction of sugar duties, although this latter position was "a little inconsistent". While a supporter of free trade, the abolition of the Corn Laws, and Robert Peel's government, he voted against the government on some occasions.

However, these positions ultimately led to his downfall at the 1847 general election, when he was defeated. While his career was "undistinguished", "the bigoted anti-colour party in the West Indies could never get over his election by an English borough, but he was extremely popular with his constituents".

Parliament of the United Kingdom
Preceded by William Alexander Mackinnon; George Burrard	Member of Parliament for Lymington; 1832–1847; With: William Alexander Mackinnon (1835–1847); Harry Burrard-Neale (1832–1835)	Succeeded by William Alexander Mackinnon; George Keppel
