= Daniel Mackinnon =

Colonel Daniel Mackinnon (1791 – 22 June 1836) was a Scottish Colonel of the Coldstream Guards who played an important part at the Battle of Waterloo.

== Family ==
Daniel was the younger son of William Mackinnon, eldest son of the Clan MacKinnon Chief in the western Highlands, and the nephew of General Mackinnon who was killed at the storming of Ciudad Rodrigo. His brother William Alexander was a Member of Parliament, whilst his sister Harriet was the wife of the High Church clergyman John Edward Nassau Molesworth.

== Life ==
=== Baltic and Peninsula ===
At the age of fourteen, he entered the army as an ensign in the Coldstream Guards, and shortly after accompanied the regiment to Bremen. In 1807, the battalion to which he belonged sailed for Copenhagen, and after the capture of that city it returned to England.

In 1809, the Coldstream Guards embarked for the Iberian Peninsula, and was present in all the great battles there against the Napoleonic forces, beginning with Talavera and ending with Toulouse. Having attained the rank firstly of lieutenant, then Captain, Mackinnon was appointed aide-de-camp to General Sir Edward Stopford. Whilst there he was also recorded as the constant companion of Lord Byron, then staying in Lisbon.

He became noted throughout the campaign by his cool daring. On one occasion, when the army was passing a defile where British troops were debouching from it under destructive fire, the troops found Captain Mackinnon coolly shaving himself in a spot where the danger was greatest. Encouraged by this, the soldiers rushed forward and drove the French before them.

=== Waterloo ===
In 1814, Mackinnon was promoted to the rank of lieutenant colonel. Early in June 1815, he embarked with another officer at Ramsgate in an open boat, in order to join his regiment who were quartered near Brussels, and arrived the next morning at Ostend. He was present at the engagements of the 16th and 17th, and at the Battle of Waterloo on the 18th, where he had three horses shot from under him.

In advancing to charge the French, leading a portion of his regiment, he received a shot in his knee which killed his horse and in falling he lost his sword. He fell close beside a French officer who was even more severely wounded, and in taking the latter's sword gently told him he hoped they might sup together that night. On recovering his legs he again mounted, urging on his men, advancing at their head. In the latter part of the day Colonel Mackinnon was ordered to occupy the farm of Hougoumont on the allied forces' flank, where he was placed with about 250 of the Coldstream Guards and the first regiment of the Grenadier Guards.

Aware of the critical importance of the farm's position, the Duke of Wellington sent orders that it be defended to the last. Napoleon ordered battalion after battalion to try to take the farm, with terrific carnage. Notwithstanding the pain of his wound, and his leg being almost disabled, Colonel Mackinnon continued to defend that perilous post until the advance of the whole British line, and the subsequent rout of the French Army, put an end to the struggle of the day. When the action was over, Mackinnon collapsed from blood loss and fatigue and was sent on a litter to Brussels to recover. He had regularly exercised before being wounded and newspaper reports ascribed his relatively early death to having to give up this habit due to the wound's after-effects.

=== Post-war life ===
On 17 July 1823, at St George's Hanover Square, Daniel Mackinnon married Anne Jane Dent by bishop's license – she was the eldest daughter of the member of parliament for Poole, John Dent. In 1826, he purchased the majority in the Coldstream Guards which gave him the rank of full colonel in the British Army, and the command of the regiment to which he had been attached all his military life.

King William IV had expressed a desire that every officer in command of a regiment should send some account of it to the War Office and Commander-in-Chief at Horse Guards. Colonel Mackinnon produced the account for his regiment, The Origin and Services of the Coldstream Guards, which was published in 1833. His library was sold at auction by Evans on 11 May 1820 in 243 lots, the anonymous catalogue entitled 'the choice and valuable library of a distinguished man of fashion'. A contemporary note on the copy of the catalogue at Cambridge University Library (shelfmark Munby.c.122(11)), ascribes the collection to Mackinnon. Mackinnon died at home on Hertford Street in Mayfair and is buried at Kensal Green Cemetery.

== Works ==
- Daniel Mackinnon (1833). Origin and services of the Coldstream guards. Vol. 1.
