= Campbell baronets of Dunstaffnage (1836) =

The Campbell baronetcy, of Dunstaffnage in the County of Argyll, was created in the Baronetage of the United Kingdom on 11 March 1836 for Donald Campbell, subsequently Lieutenant Governor of Prince Edward Island. The title became extinct on the death of the third Baronet in 1879.

== Campbell baronets, of Dunstaffnage (1836) ==
- Sir Donald Campbell, 1st Baronet (1800–1850)
- Sir Angus Campbell, 2nd Baronet (1827–1863)
- Sir Donald Campbell, 3rd Baronet (1829–1879)

== Notes ==
Baronetage of the United Kingdom
| Preceded by Bethune baronets | Campbell baronets of Dunstaffnage; 11 March 1836 | Succeeded by Rivett-Carnac baronets |
