= Thomas Dore =

English Member of Parliament

Thomas Dore (9 January 1658 – 1705) was M.P. for Lymington, Hampshire, England from 1690 to 1705.

Thomas Dore was born at Lymington, the son of Philip Dore. He was educated at Trinity College, Oxford. In 1681 he married Elianor, daughter of John Button, M.P.: they had one son and one daughter.

Dore was appointed a Freeman of Lymington in 1681 and was Mayor from 1683 to 1685. A soldier, he served in the Duke of Bolton's Second Regiment, Sir John Gibson's Regiment of Foot and Lord Lucas's Regiment of Foot. In 1705 he was appointed a Freeman of Winchester.
