= Lord George Gordon-Lennox =

British Conservative politician

- Preceded by: Sir John Rivett-Carnac, Bt; William Alexander Mackinnon
- Succeeded by: Edmund Hegan Kennard

Member of Parliament for Lymington
- In office 1860–1874

Personal details
- Born: George Charles Lennox; 22 October 1829
- Died: 22 February 1877 (aged 47)
- Party: Conservative
- Spouse: Minnie Palmer Cook (m. 1875; died 1877)
- Parent: Charles Gordon-Lennox (father)
- Relatives: Charles Gordon-Lennox (brother); Henry Lennox (brother); Alexander Gordon-Lennox (brother)

Lord George Charles Gordon-Lennox (né Lennox; 22 October 1829 – 22 February 1877), was a British Conservative politician.

== Early life ==
George Charles Lennox was born on 22 October 1829. He was the fifth son of Charles Gordon-Lennox, 5th Duke of Richmond and Lady Caroline Paget, daughter of Field Marshal Henry Paget, 1st Marquess of Anglesey. Charles Gordon-Lennox, 6th Duke of Richmond, Lord Henry Lennox and Lord Alexander Gordon-Lennox were his elder brothers. George was born with the surname Lennox; when his father inherited the Gordon estates from his uncle, the father took the surname Gordon-Lennox for himself and his issue, by royal licence dated 9 August 1836.

== Career ==
Gordon-Lennox sat as Member of Parliament for Lymington between 1860 and 1874. He was also a Lieutenant in the Royal Horse Guards.

== Personal life ==
Gordon-Lennox married Minnie Augusta (née Palmer) Cook, daughter of William Henry Palmer and widow of Edwin Adolphus Cook, in 1875. They had no children.

Lord George died in February 1877, aged 47. Lady George Gordon-Lennox remained a widow until her death in September 1913.

Parliament of the United Kingdom
Preceded by Sir John Rivett-Carnac, Bt; William Alexander Mackinnon	Member of Parliament for Lymington; 1860–1874; With: William Alexander Mackinnon 1860–1868 (representation reduced to one member 1868)	Succeeded by Edmund Hegan Kennard
