= Lulu Guinness =

British fashion designer (born 1960)

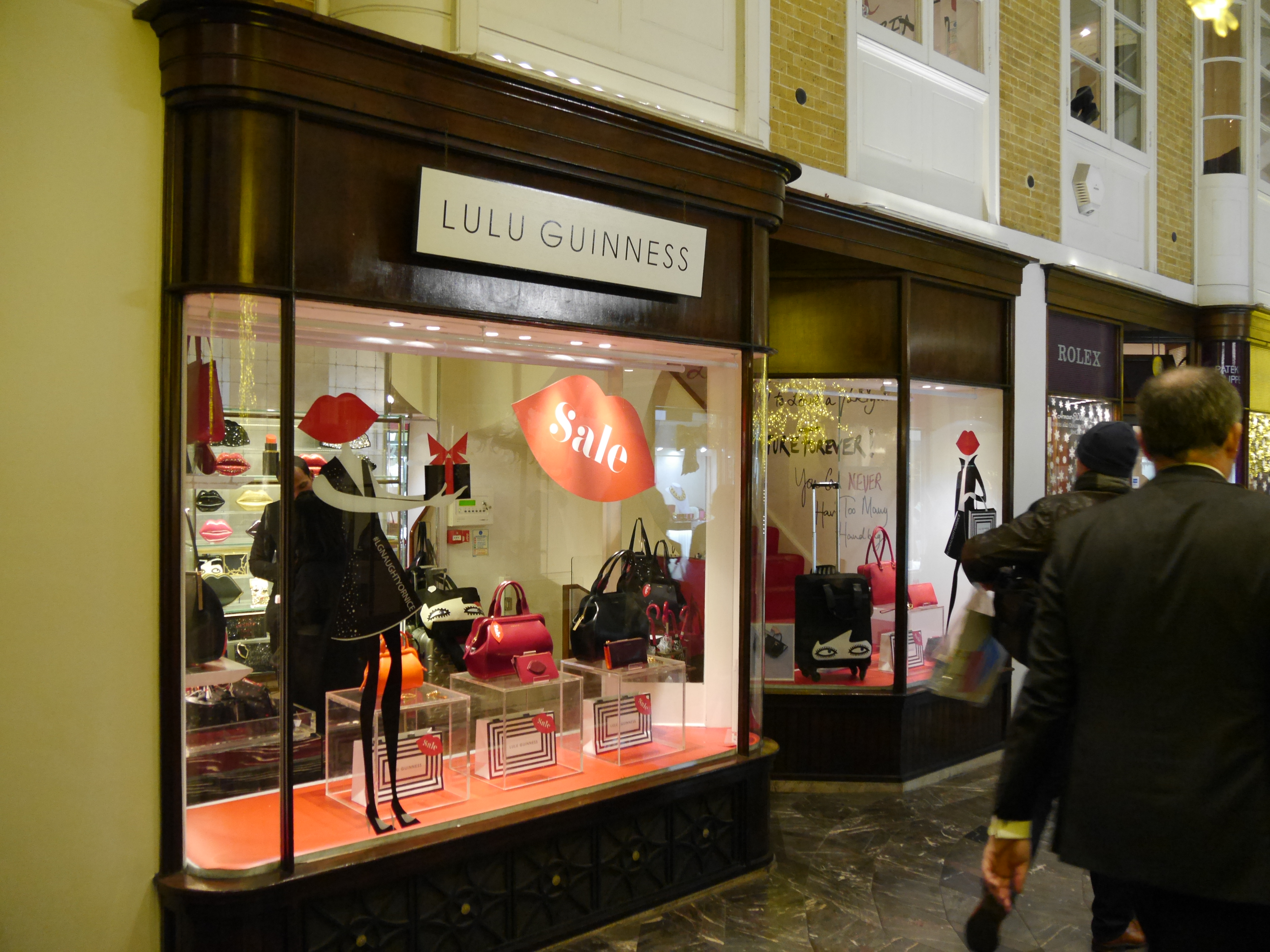
Lulu Guinness store, Burlington Arcade, London

Lucinda "Lulu" Jane Guinness OBE (née Rivett-Carnac; born 29 May 1960) is a British accessories fashion designer.

== Biography ==
She was born in May 1960, the daughter of Sir Miles Rivett-Carnac, 9th Baronet, descended from a chairman of the East India Company who was also an MP and (briefly) Governor of Bombay.

In 1986, she married the Honourable Valentine Guinness (born 9 March 1959), a younger son of the 3rd Baron Moyne. She has two daughters, Tara and Madeleine. The couple divorced in 2013, having lived apart for several years.

Lulu was appointed an OBE for services to the Fashion Industry in the 2006 Queen's Birthday Honours and in 2009 received The Independent Handbag Designer Awards ICONOCLAST Award for "Lifetime Achievement in Handbag Design".

== Lulu Guinness company ==
Lulu Guinness was launched in 1989 as a handbag and accessories retailer and currently operates multinationally.

The brand unveiled its first ready-to-wear range of clothing in 2017.

As part of her 'Collectables' range, Lulu's The Florist Basket forms a permanent part of the Victoria and Albert Museum's "The Cutting Edge: 50 Years of British Fashion 1947-1997" exhibition in London.

The brand has sold through QVC for many years.
