= Edmund Hegan Kennard =

English politician (1834–1912)

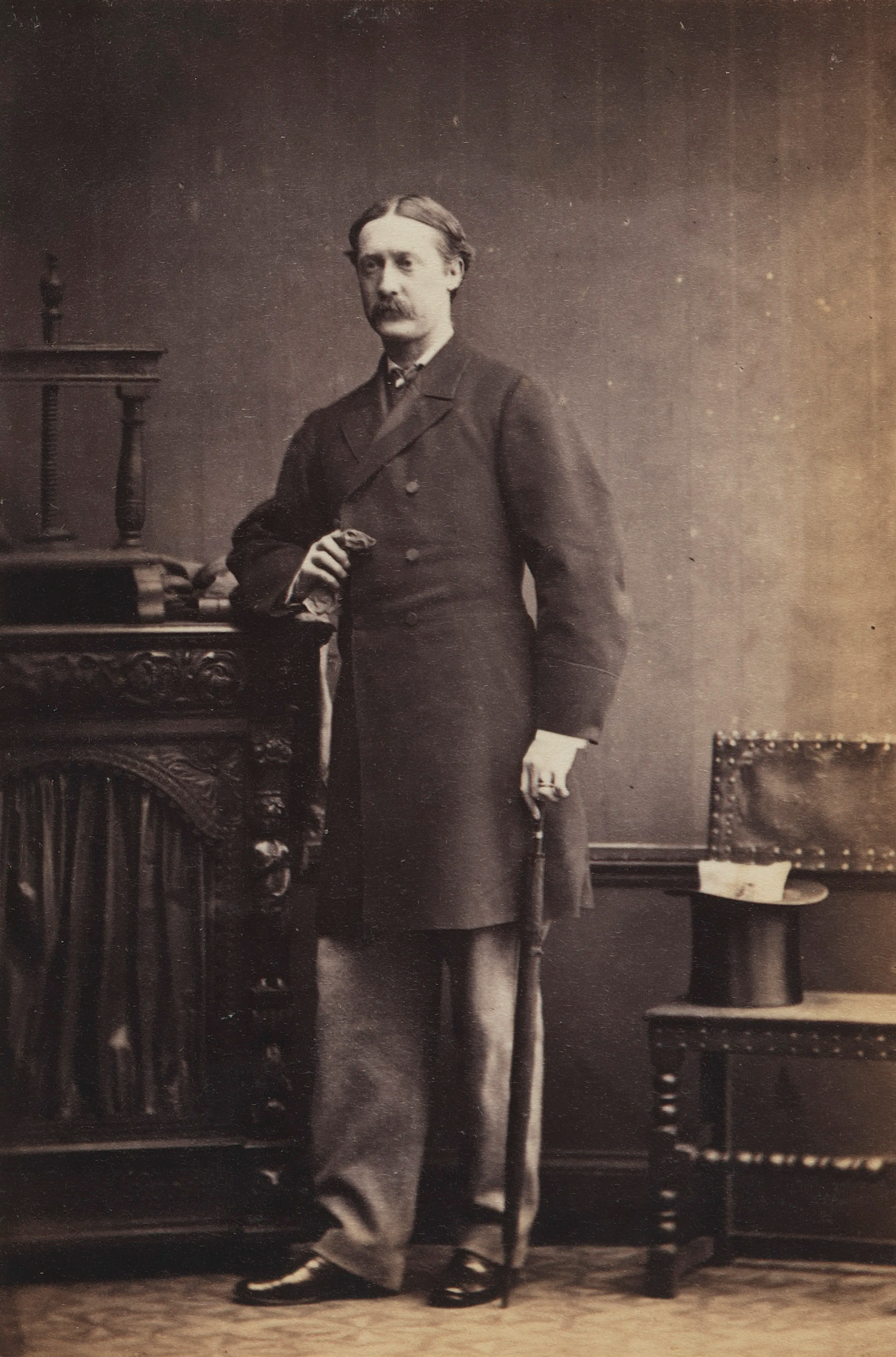
Portrait by Camille Silvy, c. 1864

Colonel Edmund Hegan Kennard VD FRGS (14 October 1834 – 9 July 1912) was an English Conservative politician who sat in the House of Commons in two periods between 1868 and 1885.

Kennard was the son of John Peirse Kennard and his wife Sophia Chapman. He was educated at Balliol College, Oxford, and joined the army, rising to the rank of Captain in the 8th Hussars.

At the 1868 general election Kennard was elected Member of Parliament (MP) for Beverley. The election was declared void on 11 March 1869. No writ was issued to replace the members and the constituency was disenfranchised by an Act which received Royal assent on 4 July 1870. The novelist Anthony Trollope was one of the defeated candidates in this final corrupt election for which Beverley was disfranchised, and drew on his experience directly for his description of the Percycross election in his novel Ralph the Heir, and also told the story in his Autobiography. Kennard was elected MP for Lymington in 1874 and held the seat until 1885.

Having left the Regular Army when he was elected MP, Kennard became Lieutenant-Colonel Commandant of the part-time 26th (Customs and Excise) Middlesex Rifle Volunteer Corps on 3 February 1870. The unit was renumbered the 15th Middlesex (The Customs and Docks) Rifle Volunteer Corps in 1880, and after Kennard retired from the command he became its Honorary Colonel on 16 December 1885. He was also ADC to the Lord-Lieutenant of Ireland.

Apart from a period when he rented Condover Hall in Shropshire for three years during the 1880s, Kennard lived at Great Tangley Manor, Guildford, Surrey, where he died at the age of 77 on 9 July 1912.

Kennard married Agnes Hegan, daughter of Joseph Hegan, in January 1868. Their daughter Victoria married Frederick Ponsonby, 1st Baron Sysonby. Agnes, Mrs Hegan Kennard, published a translation from the Magyar of Maurus Jokai's 1872 work Az arany ember (The Man with the Golden Touch) in 1888 as Timar's Two Worlds.

Parliament of the United Kingdom
Preceded by Christopher Sykes; Henry Edwards	Member of Parliament for Beverley; 1868–1869; With: Henry Edwards	Writ suspended Constituency abolished 1870
Preceded by Lord George Gordon-Lennox	Member of Parliament for Lymington; 1874–1885	Constituency abolished
