= Lauchlan Bellingham Mackinnon =

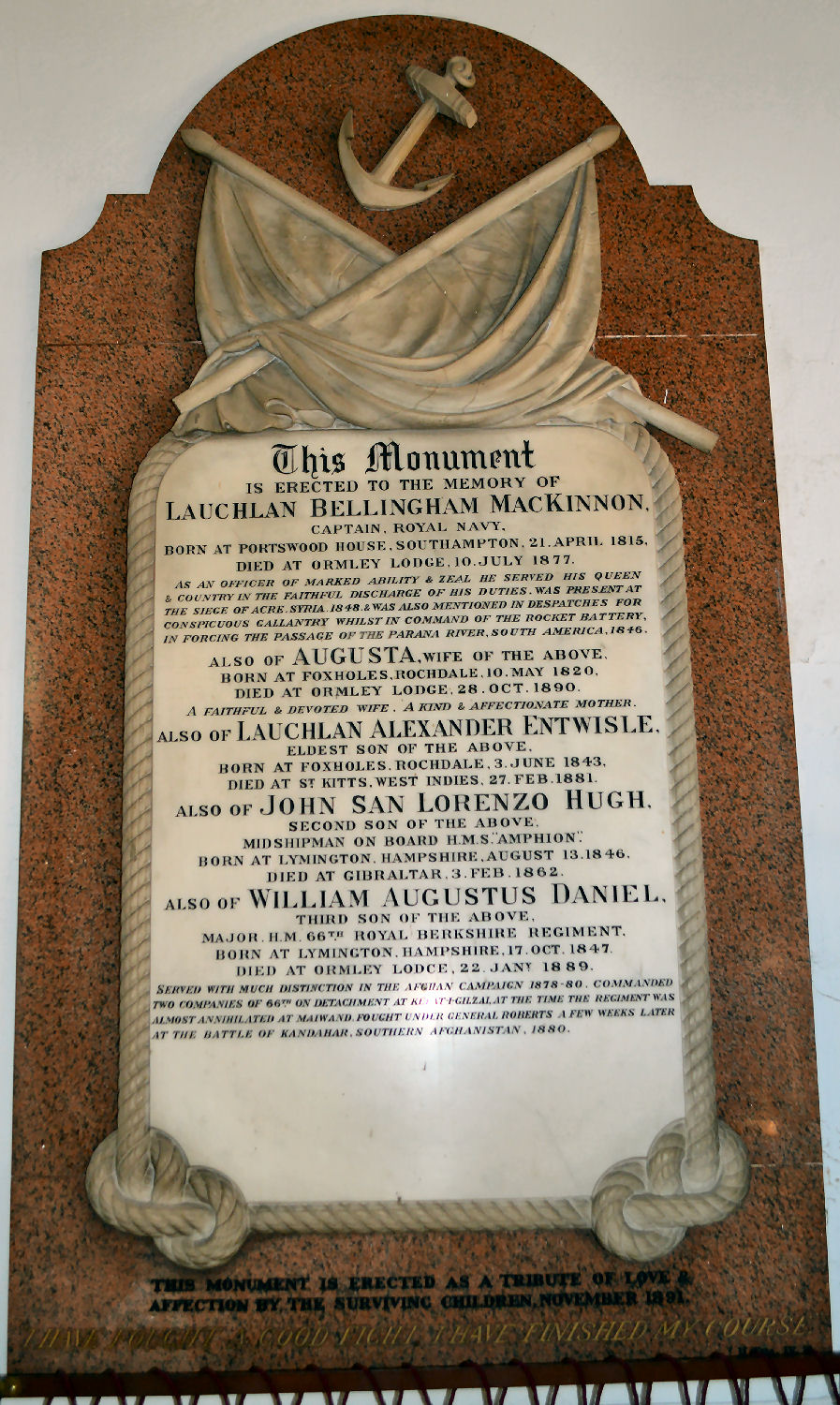
St Andrew's Church, Ham, MacKinnon memorial

Lauchlan Bellingham Mackinnon (April 21, 1815 - 10 Jul 1877) was the Member of Parliament for Rye, Sussex, England from 1865 to 1868.

He was the second son of William Alexander Mackinnon. He served with some distinction as a captain in the Royal Navy and wrote three books about his experiences: Atlantic and transatlantic: sketches afloat and ashore, Steam Warfare in the Parana and Some Account of the Falkland Islands. From a Six Months' Residence in 1838 and 1839. When his father retired from parliament in 1865 he stood for the seat in Rye as a Liberal but only served one term and never spoke in Parliament.

He died at Ormeley Lodge, Ham Common, and is buried at St Andrew's Church, Ham.

Parliament of the United Kingdom
Preceded by William Alexander Mackinnon (elder)	Member of Parliament for Rye; 1865 – 1868	Succeeded by John Gathorne-Hardy
