= Lymington (constituency) =

Former parliamentary constituency in the United Kingdom

- Former borough constituency for the House of Commons

1584–1885
- Seats: Two (1584–1868); One (1868–1885)
- Replaced by: New Forest

Lymington was a parliamentary borough in Hampshire, which elected two Members of Parliament (MPs) to the House of Commons from 1584 until 1868, and then one member from 1868 until 1885, when the borough was abolished.

== Members of Parliament ==
=== 1584-1640 ===
Parliament	First member	Second member
1584	Anthony Cooke	Richard Cooke
1586 (Oct)	Francis Keilway	William Wallop
1588 (Oct)	Francis Keilway	William White
1593	Richard Blount	John Knight
1597 (Oct)	Thomas West	Henry Wallop
1601 (Oct)	Sir Francis Darcy	Thomas Ridley
1604	Thomas Marshal	Thomas South
1614	Philip Fleming	Charles Thynne
1621-1622	Sir William Doddington	Henry Crompton
1624	Nicholas Ferrar	John More
1625	John Button	John Mills
1626	Herbert Doddington	John More
1628–1629	Herbert Doddington	Richard Whitehead
1629–1640	No Parliaments summoned	

=== 1640-1868 ===
Year	First member	First party	Second member	Second party
November 1640	John Doddington		John Kempe	
November 1640	John Button	Parliamentarian	Henry Campion	Parliamentarian
December 1648	Button excluded in Pride's Purge - seat vacant		Campion not recorded as sitting after Pride's Purge	
1653	Lymington was unrepresented in the Barebones Parliament and the First and Second Parliaments of the Protectorate			
January 1659	John Button		Richard Whitehead	
May 1659	Not represented in the restored Rump			
April 1660	John Button		Henry Bromfield	
1661	Sir William Lewis		John Bulkeley	
1663	Sir William Lewis		Sir Nicholas Steward	
1678	Sir Richard Knight		Sir Nicholas Steward	
February 1679	John Button		Bartholomew Bulkeley	
May 1679	John Button		John Burrard	
1680	Henry Dawley		John Burrard	
1685	Richard Holt		John Burrard	
1690	Thomas Dore		John Burrard	
May 1698	Thomas Dore		William Tulse	
July 1698	Thomas Dore		George Burrard	
1701	Thomas Dore		Paul Burrard	
May 1705	Thomas Dore		Paul Burrard, junior	
December 1705	Marquess of Winchester		Paul Burrard, junior	
1708	Richard Chaundler		Paul Burrard, junior	
1710	Lord William Powlett		Paul Burrard, junior	
1713	Lord William Powlett		Sir Joseph Jekyll	Whig
April 1715	Richard Chaundler		Sir Joseph Jekyll	Whig
March 1722	Lord Harry Powlett		Paul Burrard, junior	
October 1722	Sir Gilbert Heathcote	Whig	Paul Burrard, junior	
1727	Lord Nassau Powlett		Anthony Morgan	
1729	Lord Nassau Powlett		William Powlett	
1734	Sir John Cope, Bt		Colonel Maurice Bocland	
May 1741	Lord Nassau Powlett		(Sir) Harry Burrard	
December 1741	(Sir) Charles Powlett	Whig	(Sir) Harry Burrard	
1755	Lord Harry Powlett		(Sir) Harry Burrard	
1761	Adam Drummond		(Sir) Harry Burrard	
1769	Hugo Meynell	Whig	(Sir) Harry Burrard	
1774	Edward Morant		(Sir) Harry Burrard	
1778	Edward Morant		Henry Goodricke	
1780	Thomas Dummer		Harry Burrard	
1781	Edward Gibbon	Whig	Harry Burrard	
1784	Robert Colt		Harry Burrard	
1788	Robert Colt		George Rose	Tory
1790	Harry Burrard		(Sir) Harry Burrard (later Burrard-Neale)	
1791	Nathaniel Brassey Halhed		(Sir) Harry Burrard (later Burrard-Neale)	
1796	William Manning		(Sir) Harry Burrard (later Burrard-Neale)	
July 1802	William Manning		Harry Burrard	
December 1802	William Manning		John Kingston	
1806	Sir Harry Burrard-Neale, Bt		John Kingston	
1807	George Duckett		John Kingston	
1812	Sir Harry Burrard-Neale, Bt	Tory	John Kingston	
1814	Sir Harry Burrard-Neale, Bt	Tory	John Taylor	
1818	Sir Harry Burrard-Neale, Bt	Tory	William Manning	Tory
1820	Sir Harry Burrard-Neale, Bt	Tory	George Finch	Tory
1821	Sir Harry Burrard-Neale, Bt	Tory	William Manning	Tory
1823	Walter Boyd	Tory	William Manning	Tory
1826	Walter Boyd	Tory	Guy Lenox Prendergast	Tory
1827	Walter Boyd	Tory	Thomas Divett	
1828	Walter Boyd	Tory	George Burrard	Tory
1830	William Egerton	Tory	George Burrard	Tory
1831	William Alexander Mackinnon	Tory	George Burrard	Tory
1832	John Stewart	Tory	Sir Harry Burrard-Neale, Bt	Tory
1834	John Stewart	Conservative	Sir Harry Burrard-Neale, Bt	Conservative
1835	John Stewart	Conservative	William Alexander Mackinnon	Conservative
1847	Hon. George Keppel	Whig	William Alexander Mackinnon	Peelite
1850 by-election	Edward John Hutchins	Whig	William Alexander Mackinnon	Peelite
1852	Edward John Hutchins	Whig	Sir John Rivett-Carnac, Bt	Conservative
1857	William Mackinnon (the younger)	Whig	Sir John Rivett-Carnac, Bt	Conservative
1859	William Mackinnon (the younger)	Liberal	Sir John Rivett-Carnac, Bt	Conservative
1860 by-election	William Mackinnon (the younger)	Liberal	Lord George Gordon-Lennox	Conservative
1868	representation reduced to one member			

=== 1868-1885 ===
Election	Member	Party
1868	Lord George Gordon-Lennox	Conservative
1874	Edmund Hegan Kennard	Conservative
1885	constituency abolished	

== Election results ==
=== Elections in the 1830s ===
General election 1830: Lymington
Party	Candidate	Votes	%
Tory	George Burrard	Unopposed	
Tory	William Egerton	Unopposed	
Registered electors		c. 38	
Tory hold			
Tory hold			

General election 1831: Lymington
Party	Candidate	Votes	%
Tory	George Burrard	Unopposed	
Tory	William Alexander Mackinnon Sr.	Unopposed	
Registered electors		c. 38	
Tory hold			
Tory hold			

General election 1832: Lymington
Party	Candidate	Votes	%
Tory	Harry Burrard-Neale	158	43.5
Tory	John Stewart	128	35.3
Radical	John Blackiston	77	21.2
Majority		51	14.1
Turnout		219	88.0
Registered electors		249	
Tory hold			
Tory hold			

General election 1835: Lymington
Party	Candidate	Votes	%
Conservative	William Alexander Mackinnon Sr.	Unopposed	
Conservative	John Stewart	Unopposed	
Registered electors		294	
Conservative hold			
Conservative hold			

General election 1837: Lymington
Party	Candidate	Votes	%
Conservative	John Stewart	161	40.7
Conservative	William Alexander Mackinnon Sr.	138	34.8
Radical	Samuel Gregson	97	24.5
Majority		41	10.3
Turnout		227	76.7
Registered electors		296	
Conservative hold			
Conservative hold			

=== Elections in the 1840s ===
General election 1841: Lymington
Party	Candidate	Votes	%	±%
Conservative	John Stewart	170	40.0	−0.7
Conservative	William Alexander Mackinnon Sr.	149	35.1	+0.3
Whig	George Keppel	106	24.9	+0.4
Majority		43	10.2	−0.1
Turnout		266 (est)	86.5 (est)	c. +9.8
Registered electors		307		
Conservative hold		Swing	−0.7	
Conservative hold		Swing	+0.3	

General election 1847: Lymington
Party	Candidate	Votes	%	±%
Whig	George Keppel	162	37.9	+13.0
Peelite	William Alexander Mackinnon Sr.	146	34.1	−1.0
Conservative	John Stewart	120	28.0	−12.0
Turnout		295 (est)	92.8 (est)	+6.3
Registered electors		307		
Majority		42	9.9	N/A
Whig gain from Conservative		Swing	+9.5	
Majority		26	6.1	N/A
Peelite gain from Conservative		Swing	+2.5	

=== Elections in the 1850s ===
Keppel resigned, causing a by-election.

By-election, 30 April 1850: Lymington
Party	Candidate	Votes	%	±%
Whig	Edward John Hutchins	121	54.0	+16.1
Conservative	Andrew Stewart	103	46.0	+18.0
Majority		18	8.0	−1.9
Turnout		224	78.0 (est)	−14.8
Registered electors		287		
Whig hold		Swing	−1.0	

General election 1852: Lymington
Party	Candidate	Votes	%	±%
Conservative	John Rivett-Carnac	201	40.4	+12.4
Whig	Edward John Hutchins	158	31.7	−6.2
Peelite	William Alexander Mackinnon Sr.	139	27.9	−6.2
Turnout		249 (est)	73.7 (est)	−19.1
Registered electors		338		
Majority		62	12.5	N/A
Conservative gain from Peelite		Swing	+6.2	
Majority		19	3.8	−6.1
Whig hold		Swing	−6.2	

General election 1857: Lymington
Party	Candidate	Votes	%	±%
Whig	William Alexander Mackinnon Jr.	194	40.8	+9.1
Conservative	John Rivett-Carnac	187	39.4	−1.0
Conservative	Warren William Richard Peacocke	83	17.5	N/A
Whig	Patrick Francis Campbell-Johnstone	11	2.3	N/A
Turnout		238 (est)	73.5 (est)	−0.2
Registered electors		323		
Majority		7	1.4	−2.4
Whig hold		Swing	+4.8	
Majority		176	37.1	+24.6
Conservative hold		Swing	−4.8	

General election 1859: Lymington
Party	Candidate	Votes	%	±%
Liberal	William Alexander Mackinnon Jr.	157	37.2	−5.9
Conservative	John Rivett-Carnac	140	33.2	−6.2
Conservative	John Bramley-Moore	125	29.6	+12.1
Majority		17	4.0	+2.6
Turnout		290 (est)	88.8 (est)	+15.3
Registered electors		326		
Liberal hold		Swing	−5.9	
Conservative hold		Swing	−1.6	

=== Elections in the 1860s ===
Carnac's resignation caused a by-election.

By-election, 24 May 1860: Lymington
Party	Candidate	Votes	%	±%
Conservative	George Gordon-Lennox	147	54.4	−8.4
Liberal	Henry Grenfell	123	45.6	+8.4
Majority		24	8.8	N/A
Turnout		270	81.8	−7.0
Registered electors		330		
Conservative hold		Swing	−8.4	

General election 1865: Lymington
Party	Candidate	Votes	%	±%
Liberal	William Alexander Mackinnon Jr.	192	49.1	+30.5
Conservative	George Gordon-Lennox	174	44.5	−18.3
Liberal	Thomas Norton	25	6.4	−12.2
Turnout		183 (est)	52.7 (est)	−36.1
Registered electors		347		
Majority		18	4.6	+0.6
Liberal hold		Swing	+19.8	
Majority		149	38.1	N/A
Conservative hold		Swing	−18.3	

Seat reduced to one member

General election 1868: Lymington
Party	Candidate	Votes	%	±%
Conservative	George Gordon-Lennox	330	62.4	+17.9
Liberal	Daniel Pratt	199	37.6	−17.9
Majority		131	24.8	−13.3
Turnout		529	79.9	+27.2
Registered electors		662		
Conservative hold		Swing	+17.9	

=== Elections in the 1870s ===
General election 1874: Lymington
Party	Candidate	Votes	%	±%
Conservative	Edmund Hegan Kennard	449	74.0	+11.6
Liberal	William West	158	26.0	−11.6
Majority		291	48.0	+23.2
Turnout		607	85.0	+5.1
Registered electors		714		
Conservative hold		Swing	+11.6	

=== Elections in the 1880s ===
General election 1880: Lymington
Party	Candidate	Votes	%	±%
Conservative	Edmund Hegan Kennard	432	64.4	−9.6
Liberal	Hermes Southwood Smith	239	35.6	+9.6
Majority		193	28.8	−19.2
Turnout		671	86.2	+1.2
Registered electors		778		
Conservative hold		Swing	−9.6	
