= William Alexander Mackinnon (Dunwich MP) =

British politician, died 1870

William Alexander Mackinnon DL JP FRS
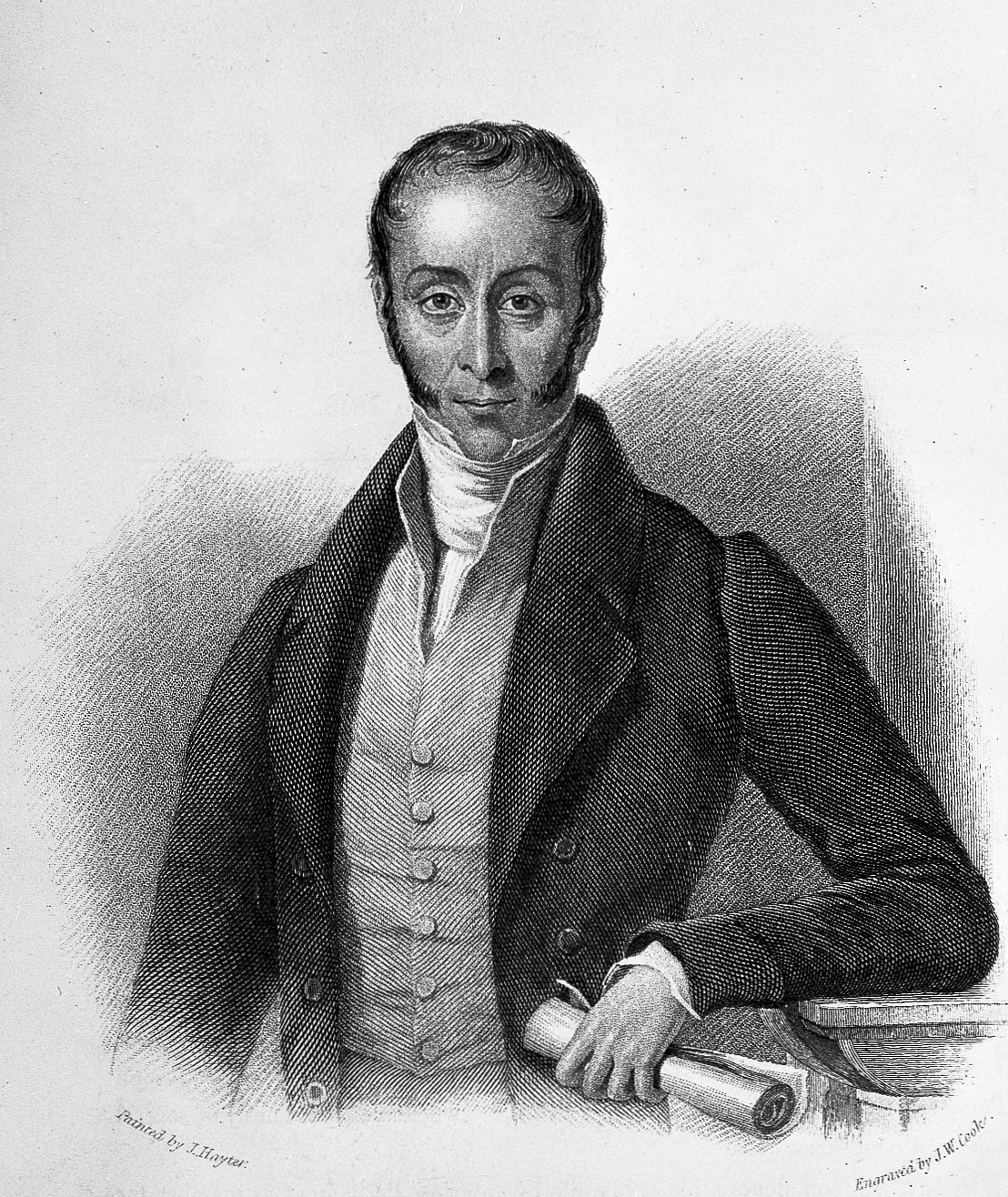

Member of Parliament for Rye
- In office 1853–1865
- Preceded by: William Alexander Mackinnon
- Succeeded by: Lauchlan Mackinnon

Member of Parliament for Lymington
- In office 1835–1852 Serving with John Stewart, Hon. George Keppel, Edward John Hutchins
- Preceded by: Sir Harry Burrard-Neale; John Stewart
- Succeeded by: Edward John Hutchins; Sir John Rivett-Carnac
- In office 1831–1832 Serving with George Burrard
- Preceded by: George Burrard; William Egerton
- Succeeded by: Sir Harry Burrard-Neale; John Stewart

Member of Parliament for Dunwich
- In office 1819–1820 Serving with Michael Barne
- Preceded by: Michael Barne; The Lord Huntingfield
- Succeeded by: Michael Barne; George Henry Cherry

Personal details
- Born: 2 August 1789 Broadstairs, Kent
- Died: 30 April 1870 (aged 80)
- Party: Whig, Liberal
- Spouse: Emma Mary Palmer (died 1835)
- Relations: Daniel Mackinnon (brother) Douglas Cochrane, 12th Earl of Dundonald (grandson); Thomas Cochrane, 1st Baron Cochrane of Cults (grandson) John Molesworth (brother-in-law)
- Children: 6, including William Jr., Lauchlan
- Education: St John's College, Cambridge

William Alexander Mackinnon DL JP FRS (2 August 1789 – 30 April 1870) was a British politician and a colonisation commissioner for South Australia.

== Early life ==
He was born in Broadstairs, Kent in 1789 and educated at St John's College, Cambridge. He was the eldest son of William Mackinnon of Antigua and Harriet (née Frye) Mackinnon, a daughter of Francis Frye of Antigua. This made him brother of Lieutenant Colonel Daniel Mackinnon and brother-in-law of John Molesworth.

He was a beneficiary of slavery in the British West Indies. He succeeded in 1809 as the 33rd Chief of the Clan Mackinnon.

== Career ==
A Whig, he was Member of Parliament (MP) for Dunwich from 1819 to 1820, for Lymington from 1831 to 1832 and from 1835 to 1852, and for Rye from 1853 to 1865. He was a signatory of the third (of four) annual report of the Colonisation Commissioners of South Australia.

At the 1852 general election he was defeated in Lymington, but his son William had been elected in Rye. However, a petition was lodged against the younger Mackinnon's election, and in May 1853 it was declared void. The elder Mackinnon successfully contested the resulting by-election on 23 May 1853. On his retirement in 1865 the seat was taken by his son, Lauchlan Bellingham. Again, treating was alleged.

He was a J.P. and Deputy Lieutenant of Middlesex. Some of his parliamentary work concerned animal welfare and in 1858 he chaired the AGM of the RSPCA, having been appointed vice chair in 1837.

He was elected a Fellow of the Royal Society in 1827, submitting a paper on the absorption of atmospheric moisture by the state of chalk and limestone. He was also invested as a fellow of the Society of Antiquaries. He was chairman of the Furness Iron and Steel Co at its inauguration in 1866. His three sons were also shareholders. He was a director of the Elan Valley Railway He wrote three books, "Thoughts on the currency question", "Public Opinion" and "The history of civilisation"

== Personal life ==
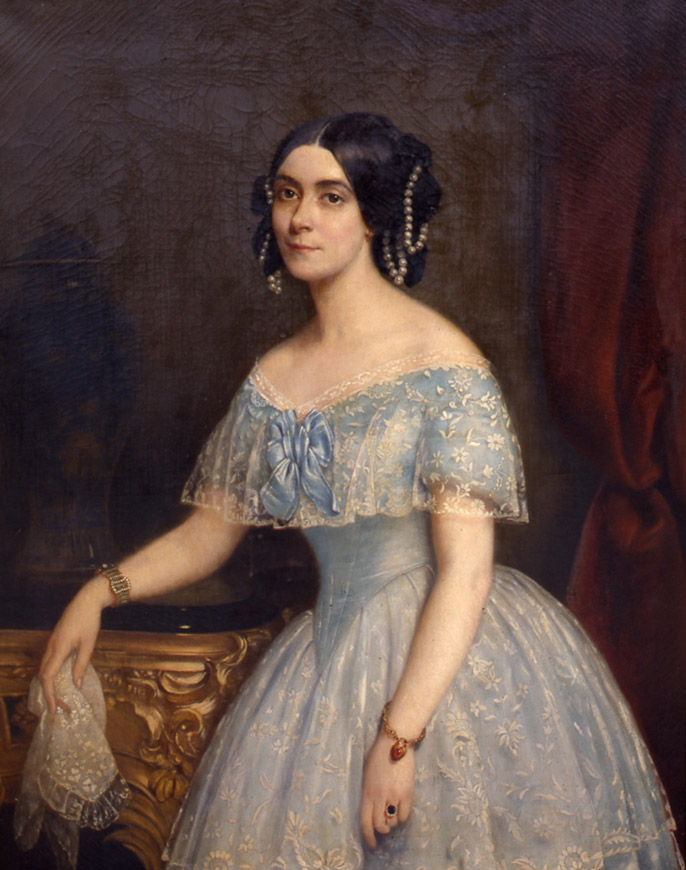
Portrait of his daughter Emma Mary Mackinnon, Duchess of Gramont, by Jules Laure.

Mackinnon was married on 3 August 1812 to Emma Mary Palmer, daughter of Joseph Palmer, of Palmerstown, County Mayo and Rush House, County Dublin. She was "a great beauty and an even greater heiress", who died 15 November 1835, and was buried in the family vault at St Peter's Church, West Molesey. They had three sons and three daughters, including:

- William Alexander Mackinnon (1813–1903), who was also an M.P.
- Lauchlan Bellingham Mackinnon (1814–1877), who was a Royal Navy captain and wrote three books.
- Emma Mary Mackinnon (1816–1891), who married Antoine Alfred Agénor, 10th Duke of Gramont, who was Foreign minister for the French Second Empire, and who instigated contact with Wilhelm I leading to the Ems Telegram. Emma was the mother of Agénor de Gramont, 11th Duke of Gramont
- Louisa Harriet Mackinnon (1821–1902), who married Thomas Cochrane, 11th Earl of Dundonald.
- Daniel Lionel Mackinnon (1824–1854) was killed at Inkerman in 1854. He married Charlotte Lavinia, daughter of Sir Dudley Hill.

Mackinnon inherited Joseph Palmer's estates. The inheritance included the estates of Greenscoe and Greenhaume near Dalton in Furness.

Mackinnon died in 1870 at his house Belvedere, Broadstairs, Kent. He was buried at St Martin's Church, near his house Acrise Place, Kent.

=== Mackinnon and the RSPCA ===
Mackinnon's religious and ‘gentlemanly’ morals drove his enthusiasm for animal welfare. During the late eighteenth century, a new type of humanitarianism was developed through evangelical piety and romanticised ideology, which advertised the plight of animals. In Britain, animals had generally been regarded ‘as man’s property, to be treated as he pleased’, however, according to Arthur W. Moss, during the nineteenth century, various organisations progressed in daring ‘to take as their objectives the prevention of cruelty to animals’.

Founded in London as the Society for the Prevention of Cruelty to Animals by Reverend Arthur Broome and Richard Martin in 1824, the charity was granted Royal status by Queen Victoria in 1840 and became the RSPCA as it is known today. From 1824, the RSPCA began concentrating on cruelty in London's meat markets, but its ambitions were not restricted to Britain's borders. Humanitarians such as William Alexander Mackinnon were eager to reduce Britain's national association with cruel sports as well as tackling cruelty overseas. Brian Harrison notes that during the 1836 annual meeting of the Society, Mackinnon took pride in the fact that ‘to Englishmen alone is the credit due, of having been the first to take up the cause of the suffering dumb creation’.

Mackinnon's role in the RSPCA was invaluable. The Society could not promote legislation of Acts of Parliament to protect animals and birds, so instead relied on the prerogative of individual MPs and governments. Mackinnon was able to present a Parliamentary Bill ‘for consolidating and amending the laws relating to the cruel and improper treatment of animals’. This initial Bill was initially unsuccessful, however, it paved the way for a partnership with Joseph Pease, MP for South Durham, who, like Mackinnon, was a member of the Society of Friends, and on the RSPCA Committee. The two worked in conjuncture, creating another Bill – the Cruelty to Animals Act 1835 – which was passed. This was a momentous step forward as it illegalised the use of public and private spheres for running, baiting or fighting bulls, bears, badgers, dogs and other animals, whether wild or domestic.

== Notes ==
Parliament of the United Kingdom
Preceded by Michael Barne; The Lord Huntingfield	Member of Parliament for Dunwich; 1819–1820; With: Michael Barne	Succeeded by Michael Barne; George Henry Cherry
Preceded by George Burrard; William Egerton	Member of Parliament for Lymington; 1831–1832; With: George Burrard	Succeeded by Sir Harry Burrard-Neale; John Stewart
Preceded by Sir Harry Burrard-Neale; John Stewart	Member of Parliament for Lymington; 1835–1852; With: John Stewart 1835–1847; Hon. George Keppel 1847–1850; Edward John Hutchins 1850–1857	Succeeded by Edward John Hutchins; Sir John Rivett-Carnac
Preceded by William Alexander Mackinnon (younger)	Member of Parliament for Rye; 1853–1865	Succeeded by Lauchlan Mackinnon
