= Henry Bromfield =

English politician

Henry Bromfield (c. 1610 – 19 February 1683) was an English politician who sat in the House of Commons in 1660. He was a verderer of the New Forest.

Bromfield was the son of Arthur Bromfield and his wife Lucy Quinby and was of Chawcroft, Hampshire. In 1660, he was elected Member of Parliament for Lymington in the Convention Parliament. He was a verderer of the New Forest, and bow bearer to King Charles II.

Bromfield married Frances Kempe, daughter of Thomas Kempe. who brought him the property of Haywood, Hampshire.
