= Chapel Royal, Hampton Court =

Coordinates: 51°24′13″N 0°20′13″W

Chapel Royal, Hampton Court Palace
- The Chapel Royal of St Peter ad Vincula, Hampton Court Palace
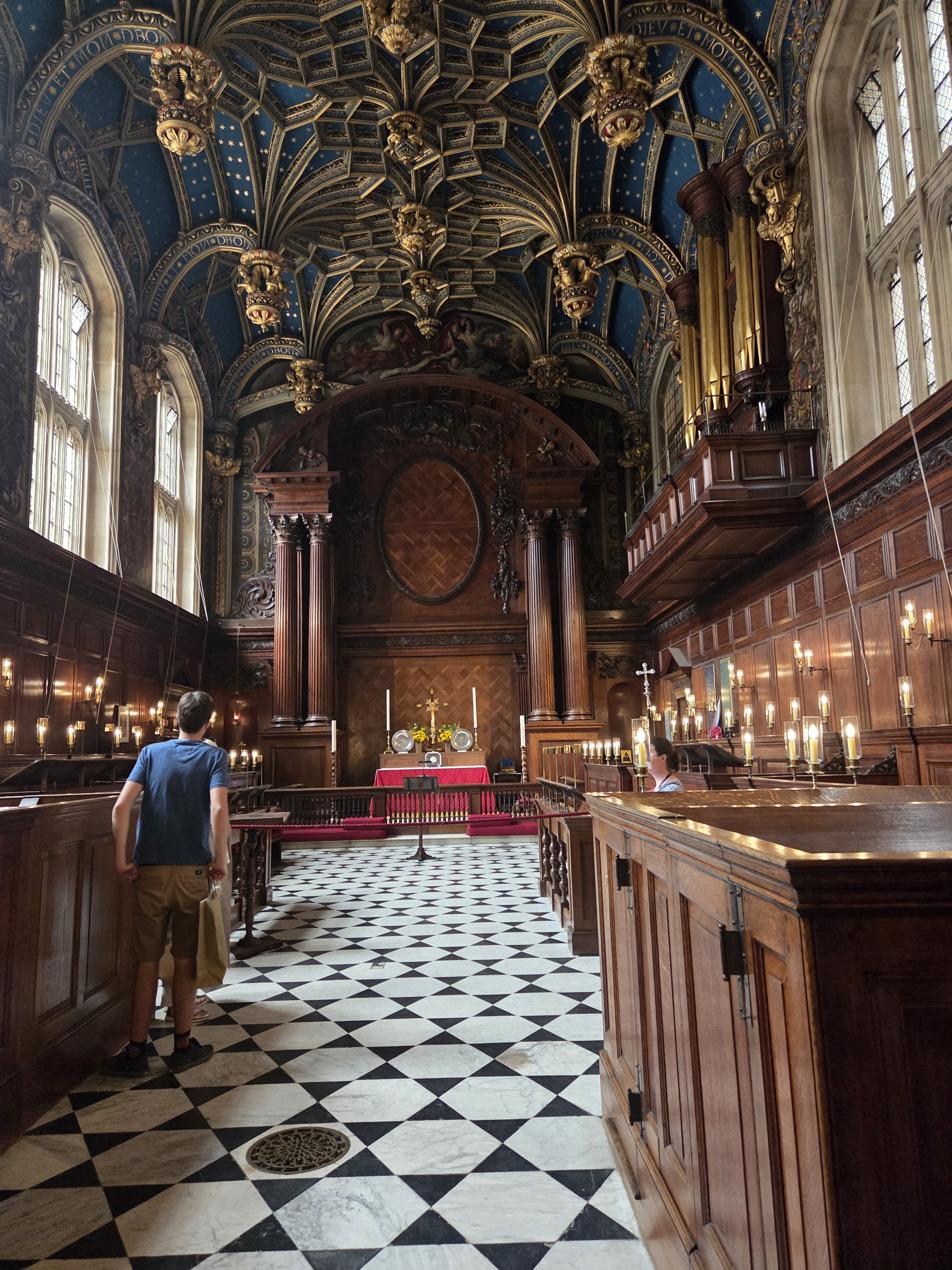
- The Chapel Royal at Hampton Court Palace
- Chapel Royal, Hampton Court Palace
- Location: Hampton Court Palace, East Molesey, Surrey
- Country: England
- Denomination: Church of England
- Previous denomination: Roman Catholic
- Churchmanship: High Church/Anglican chapel royal
- Website: hrp.org.uk

History
- Status: Chapel Royal
- Dedication: Saint Peter ad Vincula

Architecture
- Functional status: Active
- Architect(s): Henry VIII (patron); Sir Christopher Wren (restoration)
- Style: Tudor/Gothic

Specifications
- Materials: Timber roof, stone and brick

The Chapel Royal, Hampton Court Palace is the historic chapel of Hampton Court Palace, located in East Molesey, Surrey, England. It forms part of the complex of royal chapels known collectively as the Chapels Royal, which serve the spiritual needs of the sovereign and the royal household. The chapel has been in continuous use for over 480 years and is noted for its rich blue and gold Tudor roof and association with Henry VIII and subsequent monarchs.

== History ==
=== Tudor origins ===
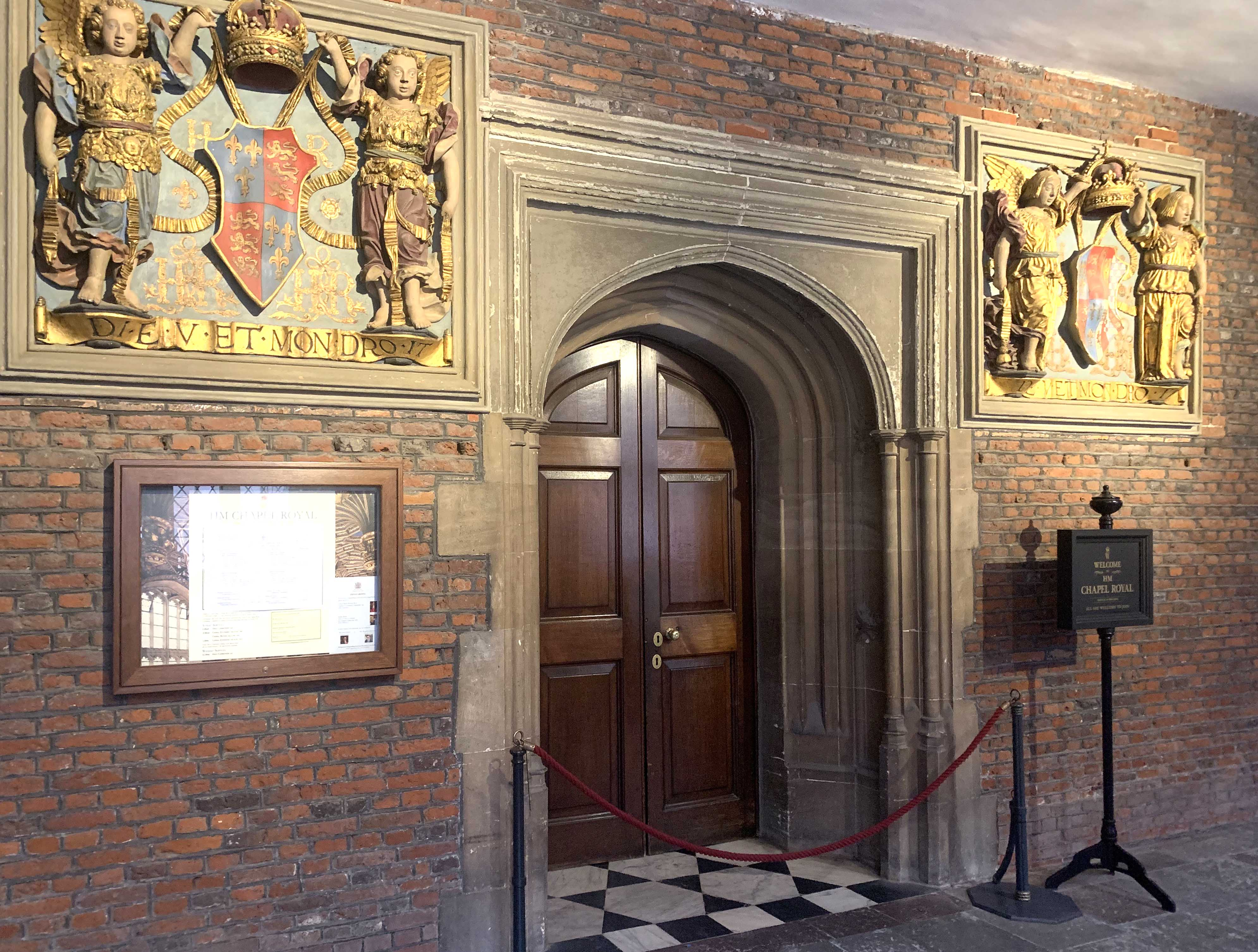
Entry to the Chapel Royal, Hampton Court

The chapel was originally built in 1518 by Thomas Wolsey, Archbishop of York and Cardinal, part of Hampton Court Palace. However, just ten years after completing the building, Wolsey was forced to surrender it to King Henry VIII. Wolsey's fall from the king's favour was caused by his failure to secure the annulment of the King's marriage to Catherine of Aragon.

Following Henry VIII's divorce and the break with Rome, the chapel became a royal place of worship for the newly formed Church of England. It played a key role in the Tudor court: in 1540, it was here that Henry VIII received news of the execution of Thomas Cromwell. Later, in 1540, it was in the Chapel Royal that Archbishop Thomas Cranmer handed Henry VIII a letter outlining the accusations of adultery against the King's new wife, Catherine Howard, Henry's fifth wife, whose downfall followed soon afterwards.

=== Stuart kings ===
During the reigns of the Stuart monarchs, the chapel continued in royal use and underwent refurbishment, notably under Christopher Wren, who was commissioned in 1710 by Queen Anne to restore and modernise the interior, while preserving its Tudor hammerbeam roof.

== Architecture ==
The chapel's most famous feature is its magnificent blue and gold Tudor ceiling, completed in 1535 and considered one of the finest examples of its type. The hammerbeam structure, richly decorated with gilded pendants and royal emblems, symbolises both religious devotion and royal authority.

The interior also contains a Renaissance-style screen and 18th-century woodwork added during the reign of William and Mary.

== Chapel Royal today ==
The Chapel Royal remains an active place of Anglican worship and holds regular services, including choral evensong sung by the Choir of the Chapel Royal, which continues a musical tradition dating back to Tudor times. It is under the jurisdiction of the Dean of the Chapels Royal and part of the Royal Household.

Visitors to Hampton Court Palace can view the chapel as part of the public tour, though it remains a consecrated space used for regular services, concerts, and special royal events. An accurate replica of the original crown worn by King Henry VIII is on display in the Royal Pew of the Chapel Royal, where Henry himself would have sat wearing it.

== See also ==
- Hampton Court Palace
- Chapels Royal
- Henry VIII
