= Francis Keilway =

English Member of Parliament

Francis Keilway (died 1602), of Rockbourne, Hampshire, was an English Member of Parliament (MP).

He was a Member of the Parliament of England for Lymington in 1586 and 1589.
