= John Button (1624–1679) =

English politician

John Button (1624 – December 1679) was an English politician who sat in the House of Commons at various times between 1659 and 1679.

Button was the only son of John Button of Buckland in Hampshire and his first wife Eleanor South, daughter of Thomas South of South Baddesley. He entered Inner Temple in 1641. He was made freeman of Lymington in 1646 and was a commissioner for militia in 1648. In 1659, he was elected Member of Parliament for Lymington in the Third Protectorate Parliament. He was re-elected MP for Lymington in 1660 for the Convention Parliament. In 1665 he succeeded his father to the estate of Buckland. He was a commissioner for assessment for Hampshire from 1677 and was a captain of the militia by 1679. In 1679 he was returned as MP for Lymington in the two elections but died before the second parliament met.

Button married Mary Jesson, daughter of William Jesson, dyer, of Coventry, Warwickshire and had a son and five daughters.

Parliament of England
Preceded by Not represented in Second Protectorate Parliament	Member of Parliament for Lymington; 1659; With: Richard Whitehead	Succeeded by Not represented in Restored Rump
