= Burrard =

Burrard may refer to:

== People ==
- Burrard baronets
  - Sir George Burrard, 3rd Baronet (1769–1856)
  - Sir George Burrard, 4th Baronet (1805–1870)
  - Sir Harry Burrard, 1st Baronet, of Lymington (1755–1813), British general
  - Sir Harry Burrard, 1st Baronet, of Walhampton (1707–1791)
  - Sir Harry Burrard Neale, 2nd Baronet (1765-1840) British admiral
  - Sir Sidney Burrard, 7th Baronet (1860–1943)
- George Burrard (disambiguation)
- Harry Burrard (disambiguation)
- John Burrard (1646–1698), British politician and Member of Parliament
- Paul Burrard (1678–1735), British politician and Member of Parliament
- Sidney Gerald Burrard (1860–1943), British army officer and Surveyor General of India

== Places in British Columbia, Canada ==
- Burrard Inlet, an inlet in Vancouver
- Burrard Peninsula, southwestern British Columbia, Canada
- Burrard (electoral district) (1896–1904, 1917–1925), a federal electoral district
- Vancouver-Burrard, a provincial electoral district
- Burrard Street, Vancouver
- Burrard Bridge, Vancouver
- Burrard station, a station on Vancouver's SkyTrain system
- Burrard Dry Dock, a shipyard in North Vancouver
- Burrard Generating Station, was a natural gas-fired station in Port Moody, British Columbia

== Other uses in British Columbia ==
- Burrard Band or Tsleil-Waututh First Nation, a First Nations band government
- Maple Ridge Burrards, a box lacrosse Club
- Vancouver Burrards, several lacrosse teams in Vancouver, British Columbia
