= Burrard baronets of Walhampton (1769) =

Escutcheon of the Burrard baronets of Walhampton

The Burrard, later Burrard-Neale, later Burrard baronetcy, of Walhampton in the County of Southampton, was created in the Baronetage of Great Britain on 3 April 1769 for Harry Burrard, for many years Member of Parliament for Lymington, with remainder failing heirs male of his own to his brothers. He was the son of Paul Burrard and the grandson of Paul Burrard, who both represented Lymington in Parliament. Burrard outlived all of his four sons and was succeeded according to the special remainder by his nephew, Harry, the second Baronet, the son of Lieutenant-Colonel William Burrard.

Sir Harry was an admiral in the Royal Navy and also represented Lymington in Parliament. In 1795 he adopted the additional surname of Neale on his marriage to Grace, daughter of Robert Neale, of Shaw House, Wiltshire. He was succeeded by his younger brother George, the third Baronet (who like the subsequent baronets used the surname Burrard only). He was a clergyman and served as Chaplain in Ordinary to Queen Victoria for 38 years. On his death the title passed to his son, George, the fourth Baronet, who sat as Member of Parliament for Lymington. He was childless and was succeeded by his half-brother, Harry, the fifth Baronet. The latter went bankrupt and the Walhampton estate was sold in 1883. He was succeeded by his cousin, Sidney, the seventh Baronet, the son of Colonel Sidney Burrard, younger son of the third Baronet. He was Surveyor General of India between 1911 and 1919. The title became extinct on the death of his son, the eighth Baronet, in 1965.

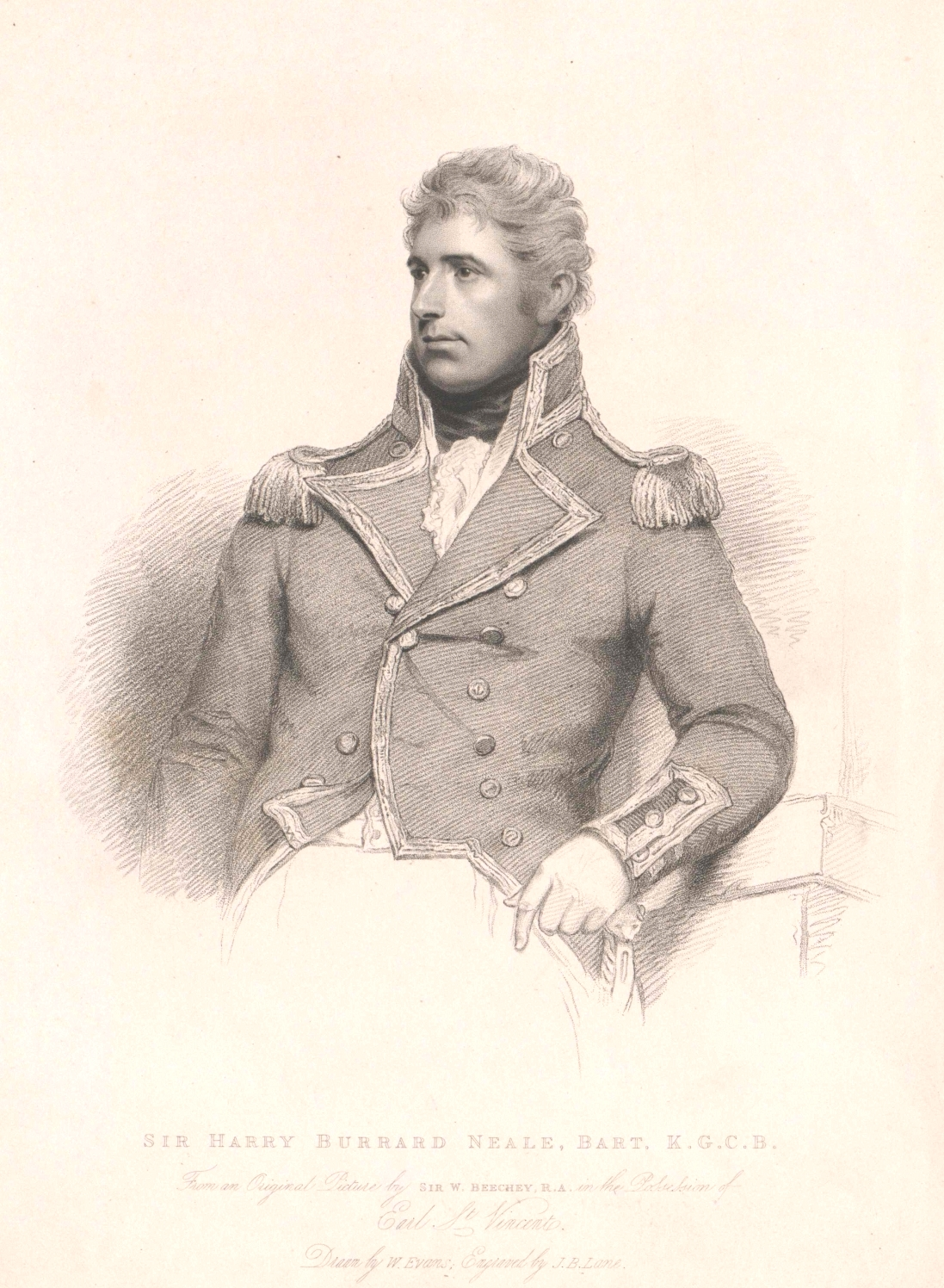
Sir Harry Burrard-Neale, 2nd Baronet

== Burrard, later Burrard-Neale, later Burrard baronets, of Walhampton (1769) ==
- Sir Harry Burrard, 1st Baronet (1707–1791)
- Sir Harry Burrard-Neale, 2nd Baronet (1765–1840)
- Sir George Burrard, 3rd Baronet (1769–1856)
- Sir George Burrard, 4th Baronet (1805–1870)
- Sir Harry Burrard, 5th Baronet (1818–1871)
- Sir Harry Paul Burrard, 6th Baronet (1846–1933)
- Sir Sidney Gerald Burrard, 7th Baronet (1860–1943)
- Sir Gerald Burrard, 8th Baronet (1888–1965), whose only son predeceased him.

== Notes ==
Baronetage of Great Britain
Preceded by Price baronets	Burrard baronets of Walhampton; 3 April 1769	Succeeded by Hume baronets
