= Harry Burrard =

Harry Burrard may refer to:

- Sir Harry Burrard, 1st Baronet, of Walhampton (1707–1791), British politician
- Sir Harry Burrard, 1st Baronet, of Lymington (1755–1813), British general during the Peninsular War, nephew of Sir Harry Burrard, 1st Baronet, of Walhampton
- Sir Harry Burrard-Neale, 2nd Baronet (1765–1840), born Harry Burrard, British Royal Navy officer and politician, also a nephew of Sir Harry Burrard, 1st Baronet, of Walhampton
- Sir Harry Burrard, 5th Baronet (1818–1871), of the Burrard baronets
- Sir Harry Paul Burrard, 6th Baronet (1846–1933), of the Burrard baronets

== See also ==
- Burrard (surname)
