= George Burrard =

George Burrard may refer to:

- Sir George Burrard, 3rd Baronet (1769–1856), Church of England priest and baronet
- Sir George Burrard, 4th Baronet (1805–1870), British politician, MP

== See also ==
- Burrard (surname)
