= William Burnaby (disambiguation) =

William Burnaby was a British naval officer.

William Burnaby may also refer to:

- Sir William Chaloner Burnaby, 2nd Baronet (1746–1794) of the Burnaby baronets
- Sir William Crisp Hood Burnaby, 3rd Baronet (c. 1788–1853) of the Burnaby baronets
- Sir William Edward Burnaby, 4th Baronet (1824–1881) of the Burnaby baronets
- William Burnaby (writer) (1673–1706), playwright and translator of the Satyricon

== See also ==
- Burnaby (surname)
