= Burnaby (surname) =

Burnaby is an English surname. Notable people with the surname include:

- Algernon Edwyn Burnaby (1868–1938), English landowner and Master of the Quorn Hunt
- Andrew Burnaby (1732–1812), English clergyman and travel writer
- Davy Burnaby (1881–1949), British stage and film actor
- Edwyn Burnaby (1798–1867), English landowner and British Army officer
- son Edwyn Sherard Burnaby (1830–1883), British Army general and Member of Parliament; son of the above
- Frederick Gustavus Burnaby (1842–1885), English army officer and traveller
- John Burnaby (priest) (1891–1978), Anglican clergyman and Regius Professor of Divinity at Cambridge University
- Louisa Cavendish-Bentinck (née Caroline Louisa Burnaby, 1832–1918), daughter of Edwyn Burnaby and great-grandmother of Queen Elizabeth II
- Robert Burnaby (1828–1878), British Columbian politician
- William Burnaby (disambiguation)
  - Sir William Burnaby, 1st Baronet (c. 1710–1776), British naval officer
