= Belizean nationality law =

Belizean nationality law is regulated by 1981 Constitution of Belize, as amended; the Belizean Nationality Act, as revised; and various British Nationality laws. These laws determine who is, or is eligible to be, a national of Belize. Belizean nationality is typically obtained either by descent or registration. Descent relies on the principles of jus soli, i.e. by birth in Belize; or under the rules of jus sanguinis, i.e. by birth abroad to parents with Belizean nationality; whereas registration applies to obtaining nationality after birth. There is currently no program in Belize for citizenship by investment, as the previous program lapsed in 2002. Nationality establishes one's international identity as a member of a sovereign nation. Though it is not synonymous with citizenship, rights granted under domestic law for domestic purposes, the United Kingdom, and thus the Commonwealth of Nations, has traditionally used the words interchangeably.

== Acquiring Belizean nationality ==
Belizeans acquire nationality by descent or registration. Belize does not allow persons born aboard government aircraft or ships, or aircraft or ships registered in Belize, to be considered as Belizean nationals.

=== By descent ===
- Persons who were a "Citizen of the United Kingdom and Colonies" under the 1948 British Nationality Act and who were registered or naturalized in Belize as a British subject prior to that Act going in to force or under the terms of the Act are citizens on 21 September 1981;
- Persons born outside Belize prior to independence who had one parent or grandparent who became, or would have become except for death, nationals of Belize at independence;
- Women who were married to a citizen of Belize or a person who became, or would have become except for death, a citizen of Belize on Independence Day;
- Persons born in Belize, as long as their parents are not nationals of a country at war with Belize or possess diplomatic immunity;
- Persons born abroad after 21 September 1981 to at least one Belizean parent; or
- Foundlings.

=== By registration ===
Persons who acquire nationality by registration include, applicants who are spouses of Belizeans and those who are eligible to be naturalised. In general, applicants for registration must be adult persons of legal capacity, who are of good character. Applicants petition the Minister of Foreign Affairs, Foreign Trade and Immigration though the Chief Immigration Officer, who considers the risk the person may pose for public morality and safety, such as criminal acts or activities in or outside the country which might upset legal or public order; by an undischarged bankruptcy proceeding; or with an insufficient means of self-sustainability. Upon approval, applicants must take an Oath of Allegiance. Belize does not permit international adoptions.

- Spousal applicants are granted at the discretion of the Minister and applicants must confirm one year of residency.
- Non-spousal applicants are required to have resided in Belize for at least five years.

== Loss of nationality ==
Nationals may voluntarily renounce their affiliation with Belize, if the declarant is a legal adult of full capacity. Denaturalisation may occur if a person obtained nationality through fraud, false representation, or concealment; acts of treason or disloyalty; certain criminal offences; and in the case of nationality by registration, residence abroad for a period of more than five consecutive years, unless they are in government service, abroad for health, enrolled abroad in an educational institution, lives with a Belizean spouse who is a national by descent, or other reasons accepted by the Minister.

== Dual nationality ==
Dual nationality is permitted in Belize, by virtue of Section 27 of the Constitution, as amended in 2017.

== Commonwealth citizenship ==
Belizeans are also Commonwealth citizens as well.

== History ==
=== Spanish period (1502–1798) ===
The Bay of Honduras was reported in Spanish records in 1502 and by virtue of a papal bull issued by Pope Alexander VI in 1492, the territory fell into the lands of the Spanish Empire. The Bay Settlement was established by shipwrecked English sailors in 1638 and the British were granted free trading rights by Spain to the area in 1667 by virtue of the Treaty of Madrid. In Britain, allegiance, in which subjects pledged to support a monarch, was the precursor to the modern concept of nationality. The crown recognized from 1350 that all persons born within the territories of the British Empire were subjects. Those born outside the realm — except children of those serving in an official post abroad, children of the monarch, and children born on a British sailing vessel — were considered by common law to be foreigners. Marriage did not affect the status of a subject of the realm. The first British settlers in Belizean territory were stateless buccaneers, who transitioned into logging, supplying hardwood for European markets. As such, they had no centralized government and relied on buccaneer codes for regulating their scattered settlements. Atypically for the Caribbean, Belize did not develop as a plantation society, yet it was similarly a monoeconomy. Slaves, who were first reported there in 1724, worked in the logging industry, primarily as timber cutters, but also as boat builders, domestics, porters, and warehouse laborers. Unlike other colonial powers with slave societies in the Caribbean, the British did not have a single slave code. Each British colony was allowed to establish its own rules about the slave trade, and though the Bay Settlement did not create its own code, it adopted the Jamaican code.

Though technically Belize was within Spanish territory, from 1744 a British Order in Council instructed that the settlement was to form a council to be supervised by a Governor with laws compatible to English law. There was still no centralized government, but English common law thereafter became the foundation to which customary practices of the Baymen were incorporated. Terms of the 1763 Treaty of Paris recognized Spanish sovereignty over the Belize Settlements but granted British loggers the right to live and work in the territory. In 1765 Admiral William Burnaby, commander-in-chief of the Jamaican Station sailed to the settlement because of threats of conflict with Spain. He established the first constitution, known as Burnaby's Code which allowed participation of all free inhabitants of Belize, or those settlers of the Bay of Honduras, in the governance structure, known as the public meeting. The code was an amalgamation of Royal Navy law and customary practices in existence in the settlement and was signed by the inhabitants, which included two women. Another conflict between England and Spain erupted in 1779 and ended with the Spanish crown allowing again, per the 1783 Treaty of Versailles, for the British colony to remain in Spanish territory. Hostilities between Britain and Spain emerged again in 1785, culminating in the 1786 Treaty of London. Spain agreed to extended the logging boundaries of the Bay Settlement, granted rights to mahogany extraction and fishing, and permitted occupancy on St. George's Caye and other islands, in exchange for the British evacuating their shore colony along the Mosquito Coast. Burnaby's Code was abolished in 1789 and then reinstated in 1791 when attempts to create a new governance structure failed.

=== British period (1798–1981) ===
The last attempt to remove the British settlement from Spanish territory occurred in 1798, and the Judicial Committee of the Privy Council noted in Attorney-General for British Honduras v. Bristowe (1880) that from that date Spain had abandoned its claim to the territory and the lands passed into the realm of the British Crown. Other than common law, there was no standard statutory law which applied for subjects throughout the realm, meaning different jurisdictions created their own legislation for local conditions, which often conflicted with the laws in other jurisdictions in the British Empire. Nationality laws passed by the British Parliament were extended only to the Kingdom of Great Britain, and later the United Kingdom of Great Britain and Ireland. In 1807, the British Parliament passed the Slave Trade Act, barring the Atlantic slave trade in the empire. From 1808, free men, both white and coloured, who had sufficient means were allowed to participate in public meetings in the Bay Settlement, but the residency requirement for whites was one year, compared to five years for freedmen. Though British legal opinion was that free people of color were neither aliens nor British subjects, the Solicitor General in London deferred to the Baymen to determine their status based upon local law. By the late 18th century, the cultural model included in descending power, whites, free coloured Creoles, free blacks, and slaves. Married women were subjugated to the authority of their husbands under coverture, and the law was structured to maintain social hierarchies by regulating familial matters like, who could marry, legitimacy, and inheritance.

In 1811, the Baymen established a Charter of Justice, which based its civil code on the customs of the colony. The 1833 Emancipation Act which ended slavery went into effect in 1834. Under its terms, slaves were converted into apprentices and remained bound to their former owners for four years if they had worked in the home and for six years if they had been field labourers. In the Bay Settlement, the apprenticeship period ended in 1838. Though free, there was never a British plan to give former slaves a voice in Parliament, leaving them as British subjects in a highly stratified system of rights. Denied political and economic rights, former slaves were not entitled to formal recognition as nationals by other nations. In 1840, the British Superintendent declared that English law extended over the Belize Settlement and that customary laws which were not in-line with English codes were revoked. In 1854 a new constitution was drawn up in London using the form of a British West Indian Colony, but without formal recognition of the settlement as a colony. It was submitted to the inhabitants of the Belize Settlement for approval. Those who were able to vote on it included British-born subjects or subjects born in the Bay Settlement. In 1862, the Settlement of Belize became an official British colony, under the administration of the Governor of Jamaica, and was renamed British Honduras. Conflict with the Maya and a need for greater security, caused the local assembly to dissolve in 1870 and give up self-governance in favor of the Crown. In 1871, the status was changed to Crown colony and a new constitution was drafted. The following year, the Crown Lands Ordinance was passed confining the Maya to reservations and barring them from land ownership.

In 1911, at the Imperial Conference a decision was made to draft a common nationality code for use across the British Empire. The British Nationality and Status of Aliens Act 1914 allowed local jurisdictions in the self-governing Dominions to continue regulating nationality in their territories, but also established an imperial nationality scheme throughout the Empire. The uniform law, which went into effect on 1 January 1915, required a married woman to derive her nationality from her spouse, meaning if he was British, she was also, and if he was foreign, so was she. It stipulated that upon loss of nationality of a husband, a wife could declare that she wished to remain British and provided that if a marriage had terminated, through death or divorce, a British-born national who had lost her status through marriage could reacquire British nationality through naturalisation without meeting a residency requirement. The statute reiterated common law provisions for natural-born persons born within the realm on or after the effective date. By using the word person, the statute nullified legitimacy requirements for jus soli nationals. For those born abroad on or after the effective date, legitimacy was still required, and could only be derived by a child from a British father (one generation), who was natural-born or naturalised. Naturalisations required five years residence or service to the crown.

Amendments were enacted in 1918, 1922, 1933 and 1943 changing derivative nationality by descent and modifying slightly provisions for women to lose their nationality upon marriage. Because of a rise in statelessness, a woman who did not automatically acquire her husband's nationality upon marriage or upon his naturalisation in another country, did not lose their British status after 1933. The 1943 revision allowed a child born abroad at any time to be a British national by descent if the Secretary of State agreed to register the birth. Under the terms of the British Nationality Act 1948, British nationals in British Honduras were reclassified at that time as "Citizens of the UK and Colonies" (CUKC). The basic British nationality scheme did not change overmuch, and typically those who were previously defined as British remained the same. Changes included that wives and children no longer automatically acquired the status of the husband or father, children who acquired nationality by descent no longer were required to make a retention declaration, and registrations for children born abroad were extended. In 1964, British Honduras was returned to self-governing status for internal matters. Effective 1 June 1973, the Colony of British Honduras changed its name to Belize, but continued as a self-governing colony until gaining independence on 21 September 1981.

=== Post-independence (1981–present) ===
Generally, persons who had previously been nationals as defined under the classification of "Citizens of the UK and Colonies", in the 1948 Nationality Act, would become nationals of Belize on Independence Day and ceased to be British nationals. Exceptions were made for persons to retain their British nationality and status if they (or their father or grandfather) were born, naturalised, or registered in a part of the realm which remained on 1 November part of the United Kingdom or colonies, had been annexed by such a place, or was a British protectorate. Other exceptions allowed women who might lose their nationality because of marriage to remain British unless their spouse lost his CUKC status and persons who had established the right of abode in the United Kingdom were permitted to retain their British nationality. Divergences from the 1948 Act included that CUKCs by descent who were born outside Belize with dual nationality did not become Belize nationals. Dual nationality was only permitted for persons who had the right of abode in the UK. The first act passed by the Parliament of Belize in 1981 was a Nationality Act with strict measures to curtail dual nationality. This was amended in 1985.
