= Burrard baronets of Lymington (1807) =

Escutcheon of the Burrard baronets of Lymington

The Burrard baronetcy, of Lymington in the County of Southampton, was created in the Baronetage of the United Kingdom on 12 November 1807 for Harry Burrard, a general in the British Army and Member of Parliament for Lymington. He was the nephew of the first Baronet of Walhampton and consequently in remainder to that title (see above for earlier history of the family).

His son, the second Baronet, was an admiral in the Royal Navy. The title became extinct on his death in 1870.

== Burrard baronets, of Lymington (1807) ==
- Sir Harry Burrard, 1st Baronet (1755–1813)
- Sir Charles Burrard, 2nd Baronet (1793–1870)

== Notes ==
Baronetage of the United Kingdom
Preceded by Jones baronets	Burrard baronets of Lymington; 12 November 1807	Succeeded by Stanhope baronets
