= Sir Harry Burrard, 1st Baronet, of Lymington =

British Army general (1755–1813)

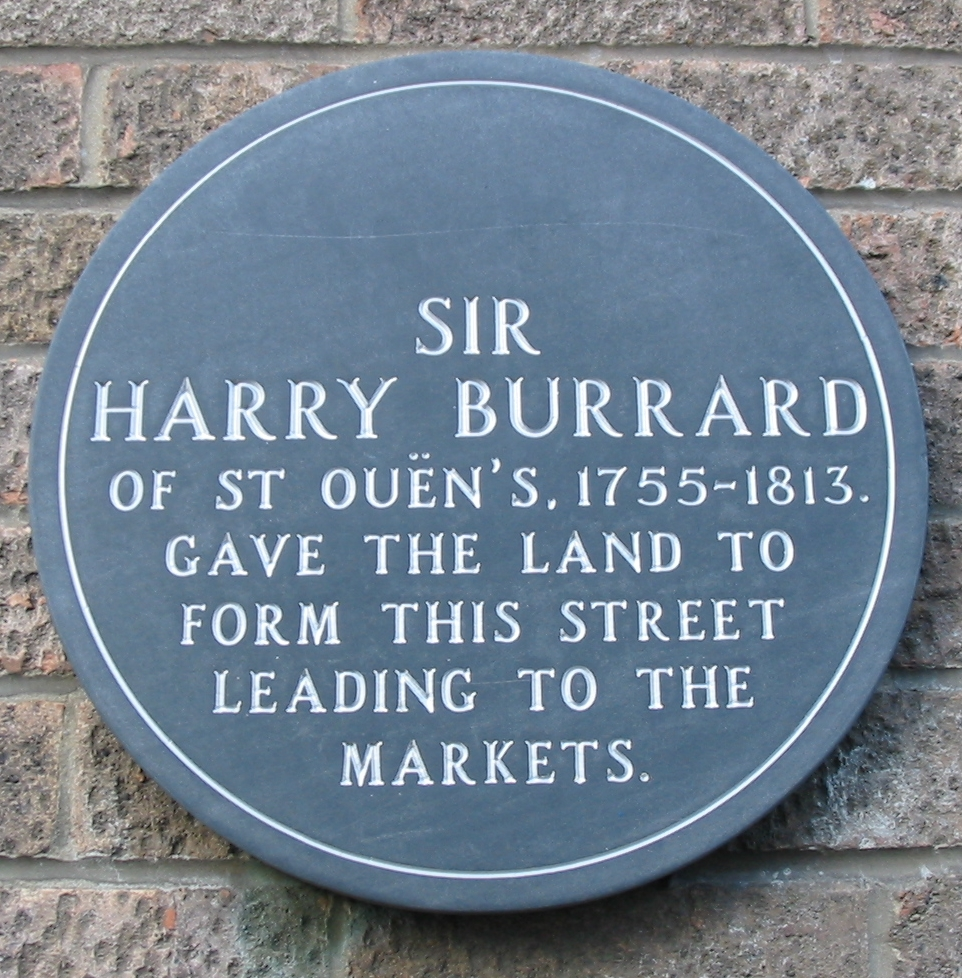
Harry Burrard inherited land in Saint Helier and enabled the construction of a road

General Sir Harry Burrard, 1st Baronet (1 June 1755 – 17 October 1813) was a British soldier and officer who fought in the American War of Independence, the French Revolutionary Wars and in the Peninsular War.

== Biography ==
Burrard was born at Walhampton on 1 June 1755, the elder son of George Burrard of Walhampton, Hampshire, who was the third son of Paul Burrard, M.P. for Lymington from 1706 to 1736, and younger brother of Sir Harry Burrard, M.P. for Lymington from 1741 to 1784 and created a baronet in 1769.

Burrard became an ensign in the Coldstream Guards in 1772. He was promoted lieutenant and captain in 1773, and in 1777 exchanged into the 60th Foot, in order to see service in the American War of Independence. With his regiment he served under Sir William Howe in 1778 and 1779—He was captured during a raid on the Bruges canal in 1798. He led the 2nd Brigade during the 1799 Anglo-Russian invasion of Holland, fighting at the battles of Bergen, Egmont and Castricum. In 1780 returned to England on being elected M.P. for Lymington through the influence of his uncle Sir Harry. He served under Lord Cornwallis in America in 1781 and 1782.

After peace had been declared he returned to the guards in 1786 as lieutenant and captain in the Grenadier Guards, and was promoted captain and lieutenant-colonel in 1789. With the guards he served in Flanders from 1793 to 1795, and was promoted colonel in 1795, and major-general in 1798. In 1804 he became lieutenant-colonel commanding the 1st Foot Guards, and in 1805 he was promoted lieutenant-general.

In 1807 he received his first command in the expedition to Copenhagen under Lord Cathcart, when he commanded the 1st Division, and as senior general under Cathcart acted as second in command. He had very little to do in the expedition; yet on his return he was created a baronet, and also made governor of Calshot Castle.

In 1808 he was selected to supersede Sir Arthur Wellesley. He arrived on the coast of Portugal on 19 August, and wisely decided not to interfere with Sir Arthur Wellesley's arrangements. On 21 August Jean-Andoche Junot attacked Sir Arthur's position at Vimeiro, and was successfully beaten off, and the British general had just ordered Ronald Ferguson to pursue the beaten enemy, when Burrard assumed the chief command, and, believing the French had a reserve as yet untouched, forbade Ferguson to advance. The very next day Sir Hew Dalrymple assumed the chief command, and made the Convention of Cintra, with the full concurrence of Burrard, while Wellesley was ordered to do so due to his opposition to the convention. All three generals were recalled, and a court of inquiry was appointed to examine their conduct. Burrard succinctly declared the reasons for his course of action on 21 August. While the inquiry officially absolved all three, unofficially the blame fell on Burrard and Dalrymple. Wellesley soon returned to active duty in Portugal, while Burrard and Dalrymple were pushed into a series of obscure administrative posts and never again held an active command.

Burrard never applied for another command, but in 1810 as senior lieutenant-colonel he assumed the command of the Brigade of Guards in London. He died at Calshot Castle near Fawley, Hampshire, on 17 October 1813. He was buried in Lymington churchyard. He was succeeded by his eldest surviving son, Charles (1793–1870), an officer who rose to the rank of admiral in the Royal Navy and on whose death in 1870 the baronetcy became extinct.

== Family ==
On 20 February 1789 he married Hannah, the daughter of Harry Darby, a London merchant; they had five sons and two daughters. All the sons served in the army or the navy. Two sons were killed in 1809, one of whom was acting as aide-de-camp to Sir John Moore at the Battle of Corunna. He lost a third at the siege of San Sebastián, which is said to have caused him to die of a broken heart. His wife survived him.

== In fiction ==
He appears in Naomi Novik's fifth Temeraire novel, Victory of Eagles, and in Dewey Lambdin's novel Kings and Emperors, book 21 of the Alan Lewrie series.

== Notes ==
Parliament of Great Britain
Preceded by Edward Morant; Henry Goodricke	Member of Parliament for Lymington; 1780–1788; With: Thomas Dummer 1780–81; Edward Gibbon 1781–84; Robert Colt 1784–88	Succeeded by Robert Colt; George Rose
Preceded by Robert Colt; George Rose	Member of Parliament for Lymington; 1790–1791; With: Sir Harry Burrard-Neale	Succeeded by Sir Harry Burrard-Neale; Nathaniel Brassey Halhed
Parliament of the United Kingdom
Preceded by Sir Harry Burrard-Neale; William Manning	Member of Parliament for Lymington; 1802–1802; With: William Manning	Succeeded by William Manning; John Kingston
Military offices
Preceded by Sir Harry Burrard	Governor of Calshot Castle; 1787–1813	Succeeded by The Earl of Cavan
Baronetage of the United Kingdom
New title	Baronet (of Lymington); 1807–1813	Succeeded by Charles Burrard
