= Edward Morant (politician) =

British politician and plantation owner

Honourable Edward Morant DCL
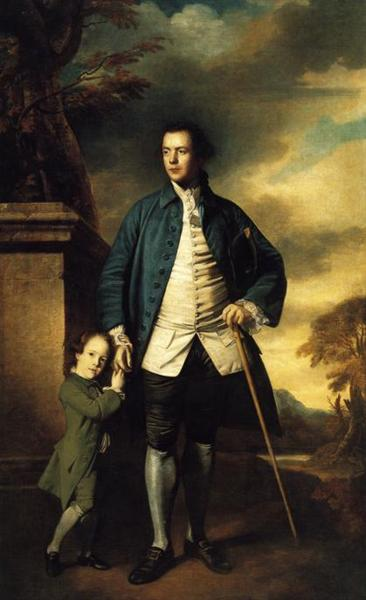
- Edward Morant and his son John, by Joshua Reynolds
- Born: c. 1730
- Died: 27 July 1791
- Occupation: Member of parliament

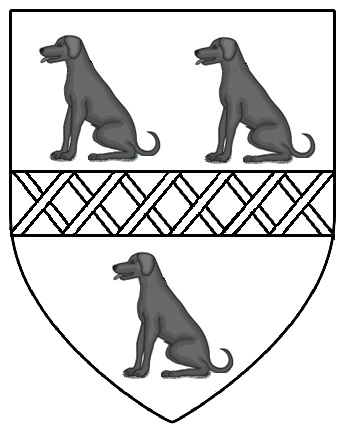
Coat of arms Morant

Edward Morant (1730–1791) was a British politician and plantation owner who sat in the House of Commons for 26 years from 1761 to 1787.

== Early life and education ==
Morant was the son of John Morant of Jamaica and his wife Mary Pennant, daughter of Edward Pennant, chief justice of Jamaica, and was baptised on 10 December 1730.

He was educated at John Roysse's Free School in Abingdon, (now Abingdon School). He matriculated at St Mary Hall, Oxford on 7 March 1747. gaining a Doctor of Civil Law. Morant's father died when he was three and when he came of age, he inherited family estates on the island of Jamaica; they were put at 8,159 acres (3,302 ha), and the plantation accounts show an average income from Jamaica of about £20,000 per annum. Several places on the island take the family name including Morant River, Morant Point and Morant Bay.

== Marriages ==
Morant married firstly Eleanor Angelina Dawkins, widow of William Dawkins and daughter of Edward Yeamans of Liguanea, Jamaica, on 10 June 1754. She died two years later. Morant represented Vere in the Jamaica assembly between 1752 and 1756 and served in the council from 1757 to 1759. He left Jamaica for England in 1759. He made a second marriage to Mary Whitehorne Goddard, daughter of James Goddard of Conduit St London on 22 April 1762.

== Political career ==
In the 1761 general election Morant was returned on William Beckford's interest as Member of Parliament for Hindon. In the 1768 general election he stood for re-election at Hindon, but his own agents threw him over just before the poll and he came third. In February 1770 he purchased Brockenhurst House at Brockenhurst near Lymington for £6,400 and began to move in the foremost political and social circles. He was awarded DCL in 1773.

Morant next stood for parliament in 1774 when he was put up by his friend the Duke of Bolton for Lymington and was elected MP. As he was unlikely to be returned again for Lymington he quickly arranged to stand at Yarmouth in the 1780 general election and was returned as MP in that and the next election in 1784. He supported the 1783 East India Bill and the Peace of Paris (1783). He vacated his seat in 1787. He was described as a thoroughly independent Member: never held, nor solicited, any office or favour.

== Later years ==
On 16 July 1791, Morant was driving in Kensington when his horses took fright. He was thrown from the carriage and carried home senseless. He died on 27 July 1791. His son Edward Morant was a cricketer.

Parliament of Great Britain
Preceded by James Calthorpe; William Mabbott	Member of Parliament for Hindon; 1761–1768; With: William Blackstone	Succeeded by John St Leger Douglas; William Hussey
Preceded by Hugo Meynell (Sir) Harry Burrard	Member of Parliament for Lymington; 1774–1780; With: (Sir) Harry Burrard 1774-1778; Henry Goodricke 1778-1780	Succeeded by Thomas Dummer; Harry Burrard
Preceded by James Worsley; Captain Robert Kingsmill	Member of Parliament for Yarmouth; 1780– 1787; With: Edward Rushworth1780-1781; Sir Thomas Rumbold1781-1784; Philip Francis1784-1787	Succeeded by Thomas Clarke Jervoise; Philip Francis

== See also ==
- List of Old Abingdonians
