= William Manning (British politician) =

British politician

- Portrait by James Lonsdale, 1813
- Born: 1 December 1763
- Died: 17 April 1835 (aged 71)
- Occupations: Merchant, politician
- Spouse(s): Elizabeth Smith; Mary Hunter
- Children: 10, including Henry
- Parent(s): William Coventry Manning; Elizabeth Ryan
- Relatives: Benjamin Vaughan (brother-in-law); John Laurens (brother-in-law)

William Manning (1 December 1763 – 17 April 1835) was a British merchant, politician, and Governor of the Bank of England.

== Biography ==
Manning was the son of West India merchant William Coventry Manning and Elizabeth Ryan. Manning's sister Martha married American Revolutionary War patriot John Laurens.

Manning joined his father's firm, taking control after his father's death in 1791. He was elected a Director of the Bank of England from 1792 to 1831 and its Governor between 1812 and 1814, having served as its Deputy Governor from 1810 to 1812.

He worked as a merchant in the West Indies, acting as agent for St Vincent (1792–1806) and for Grenada (1825–1831). He also invested in the Australian Agricultural Company, becoming its Deputy Governor in 1826, and was president of the London Life Assurance from 1817 to 1830. The Manning River in New South Wales, Australia was named in his honour.

Around the same time, Manning and several other merchants lobbied Secretary for Colonies William Huskisson for exclusive trading rights with New Zealand. A "William Mannings" is listed as a director of the New Zealand Company in 1825, a venture chaired by the wealthy John George Lambton, Whig MP (and later 1st Earl of Durham), that made the first attempt to colonise New Zealand.

Between 1794 and 1830 Manning served almost continuously as a Member of Parliament in turn for Evesham, Lymington and Penryn. He was a prominent slave owner and member of the West India Committee. He was active politically trying to prevent the abolition of slavery.

== Personal life ==
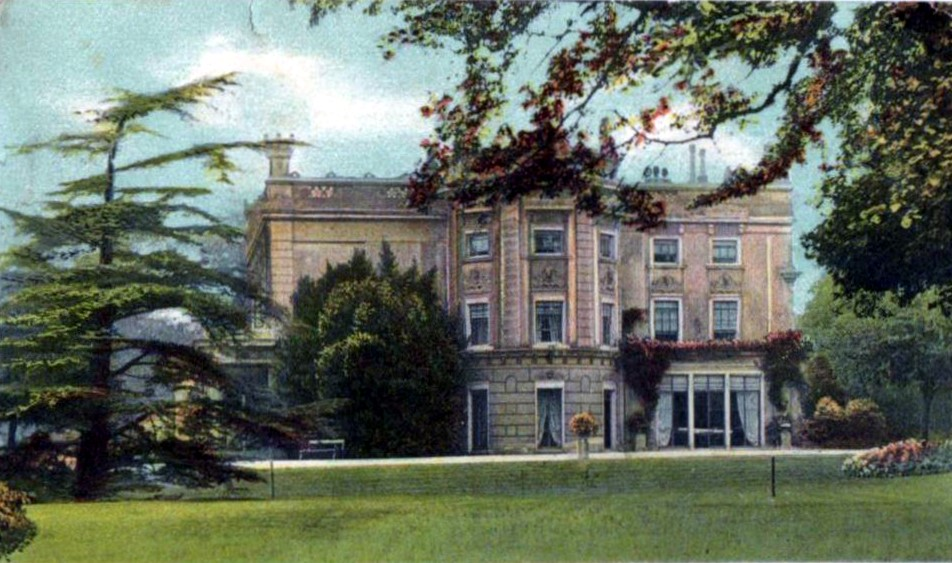
Copped Hall, Hertfordshire

He married twice; firstly Elizabeth Smith, daughter of banker Abel Smith of Nottingham, with whom he had two daughters and secondly Mary Hunter, daughter of barrister Henry Lannoy Hunter of Beech Hill, Reading, Berkshire with whom he had four sons and four daughters.

He inherited Copped Hall, Totteridge, Hertfordshire, where his second wife Mary Hunter re-designed the grounds, probably with the advice of Humphry Repton, damming the Folly Brook to create the ornamental Darland's Lake.

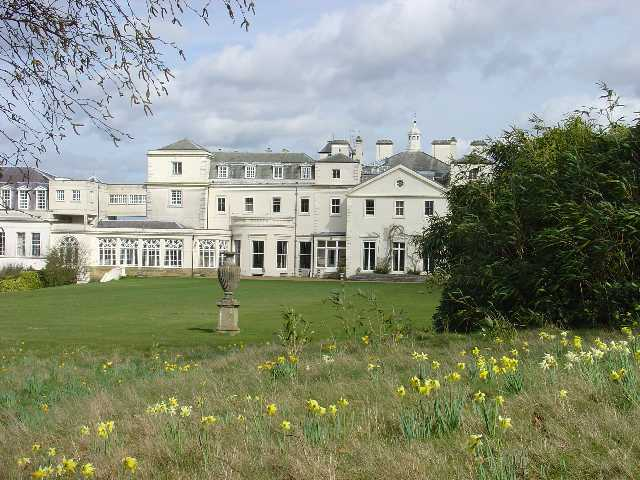
Combe Bank

After the death of Lord Frederick Campbell in 1816, he bought Combe Bank near Sevenoaks, Kent from Campbell's daughter. However, he got into financial difficulties in the 1820s and had to declare himself bankrupt in 1831. He was forced to resign from the Bank of England, sell his estates and move to a smaller property in Gower Street, London.

William Manning died at Gower Street in 1835 and was buried at Sundridge, Kent.

One son, Henry Manning, was ordained as an Anglican clergyman and became a leader of the Oxford Movement, later converting to Catholicism and becoming the Archbishop of Westminster in 1865.

== Notes ==
Parliament of Great Britain
Preceded by The Earl of Carhampton; Philip Metcalfe	Member of Parliament for Plympton Erle; 1794–1796; With: Philip Metcalfe	Succeeded by William Adams; William Mitchell
Preceded by Sir Harry Burrard-Neale, Bt; Nathaniel Brassey Halhed	Member of Parliament for Lymington; 1796–1801; With: Sir Harry Burrard-Neale, Bt	Parliament of Great Britain abolished
Parliament of the United Kingdom
New creation Parliament of the United Kingdom created	Member of Parliament for Lymington; 1801–1806; With: Sir Harry Burrard-Neale, Bt to 1802; Harry Burrard 1802; John Kingston 1802–1806	Succeeded by John Kingston; Sir Harry Burrard-Neale, Bt
Preceded by Patrick Craufurd Bruce; Charles Thellusson	Member of Parliament for Evesham; 1806–1818; With: Humphrey Howorth 1806–1807, 1808–1818; Sir Manasseh Lopes, Bt 1807–1808	Succeeded by William Rouse-Boughton; Humphrey Howorth
Preceded by Sir Harry Burrard-Neale, Bt; John Taylor	Member of Parliament for Lymington; 1818–1820; With: Sir Harry Burrard-Neale, Bt	Succeeded by Sir Harry Burrard-Neale, Bt; George Finch
Preceded by Sir Harry Burrard-Neale, Bt; George Finch	Member of Parliament for Lymington; 1821–1826; With: Sir Harry Burrard-Neale, Bt to 1823; Walter Boyd from 1823	Succeeded by Walter Boyd; Guy Lenox Prendergast
Preceded by Pascoe Grenfell; Robert Stanton	Member of Parliament for Penryn; 1826–1830; With: David Barclay	Succeeded by Sir Charles Lemon; James William Freshfield
Government offices
Preceded by John Pearse	Governor of the Bank of England; 1812–1814	Succeeded by William Mellish
