= Edward Gale =

English cricketer

Personal information
- Full name: Edward John Morant Gale
- Born: 7 October 1818; Banbury, Oxfordshire, England
- Died: 23 February 1894 (aged 75); Hove, Sussex, England
- Relatives: Edward Morant (father)

Domestic team information
- Years: Team
- 1843–1845: Hampshire

Career statistics
Competition	First-class
Matches	7
Runs scored	92
Batting average	6.57
100s/50s	0/0
Top score	27
Catches/stumpings	6/–
- Source: Cricinfo, 6 March 2010

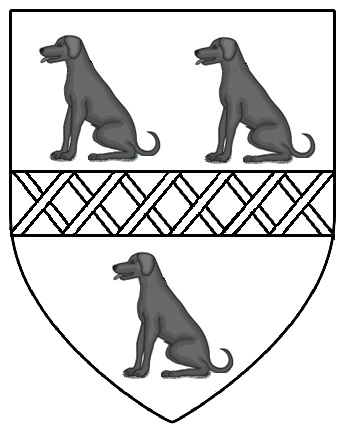
Coat of arms Morant

Edward John Morant Gale (7 October 1818 – 23 February 1894) was an English first-class cricketer.

== Biography ==
Gale was the son of Edward Morant of Upton near Banbury, who made three first-class appearances in his cricket career. He matriculated at Christ Church, Oxford on 11 May 1837.

Gale made his first-class debut for Hampshire against the Marylebone Cricket Club in 1843. Gale represented Hampshire in seven first-class matches from 1843 to 1845 with his final match for Hampshire coming against the Marylebone Cricket Club in 1845. In his seven matches for Hampshire he scored 92 runs at a batting average of 6.57. His highest score was 27.

Gale succeeded his father, who took the additional surname Gale on inheriting slave plantations in Jamaica from his uncle William Gale. and resided at Upham House, Bishop's Waltham, Hampshire. He married Maria Henrietta Stuart, second daughter of Sir Simeon Stuart, Bt in 1845. He died at Hove, Sussex on 23 February 1894.
