= Paul Benfield =

British politician and businessman

Paul Benfield (1742–1810) was an English East India Company employee and trader, financier and politician. He is now known as a target for the rhetoric of Edmund Burke, and for his spectacular bankruptcy.

== Life ==
Benfield went out to India as a civil servant of the East India Company in 1764, on a modest salary. He reportedly amassed a fortune of over £500,000. At Madras he entered into partnership with local Indian bankers. He made money partly by trade, partly by loans at high rates of interest, and partly by contracts. He had extensive money transactions with the Nawab of the Carnatic, and he entered into and completed contracts with the government for the construction of fortifications for the town of Madras and for Fort St. George.

== The Carnatic affair ==
One of Benfield's major loans was made for the purpose of enabling the Nawab, who, with the aid of the English, had invaded and conquered the Maratha state of Tanjore, to satisfy some claims of the Dutch at Tranquebar on territories of the Rajah of Tanjore. Benfield was then charged with having helped malcontents in the Madras council, in conflict with George Pigot, 1st Baron Pigot. He was ordered by the Company's court of directors in 1777 to return to England. He resigned the Company's service, and on reaching London in 1779 demanded an investigation into his conduct.

Benfield made no attempt to conceal his loans to the Nawab, stating that though they had been extensive, they had not been of a clandestine nature, and that they were well known to the governor, to the council, and indeed to the whole settlement. He alleged that he had enjoyed commercial confidence, argued that by his loans he had prevented war, and had promoted the interests of the Company. He was subsequently restored to the service and permitted to return to Madras: the court of directors resolving that his conduct, in relation to the loan to satisfy the claims of the Dutch, was beneficial.

== In England ==
During his stay in England in 1780, Benfield was elected to Parliament as member for Cricklade, spending freely to do so. At the same time William Burke was working for the Rajah of Tanjore. When Benfield brought an action for bribery against his opponent, S. Petrie, which was tried at Salisbury 12 March 1782, Petrie was defended by Richard Burke Jr. and William Pitt the Younger. Petrie was acquitted, and published an account of the trial with a letter giving his history of the case in 1782. It was said in the case that Benfield returned eight or nine members to parliament; this assertion is not now given credence.

Benfield finally returned to England, via France, in 1793. He established a mercantile firm in London, called Boyd, Benfield, & Co., with Walter Boyd. He entered Parliament again, for Malmesbury (1790), and then by buying into the seat of Shaftesbury. Boyd engaged in speculations which turned out badly, and Benfield's fortune collapsed rapidly. He died in Paris in poverty in 1810.

== Family ==
In 1793, Benfield married Mary Frances Swinburne, of Hamsterley, Durham, eldest daughter of Henry Swinburne. The marriage settlement was lavish. They had a son and at least two daughters; their elder daughter Henrietta Sophia was married to Robert Berkeley, of Spetchley, while their younger daughter Caroline Martha was married in 1824 to Grantley Berkeley. Through these marriages, their descendants married into several aristocratic families such as the Feildings (earls of Denbigh & Desmond), and landed families.
