= Price baronets of Jamaica (1768) =

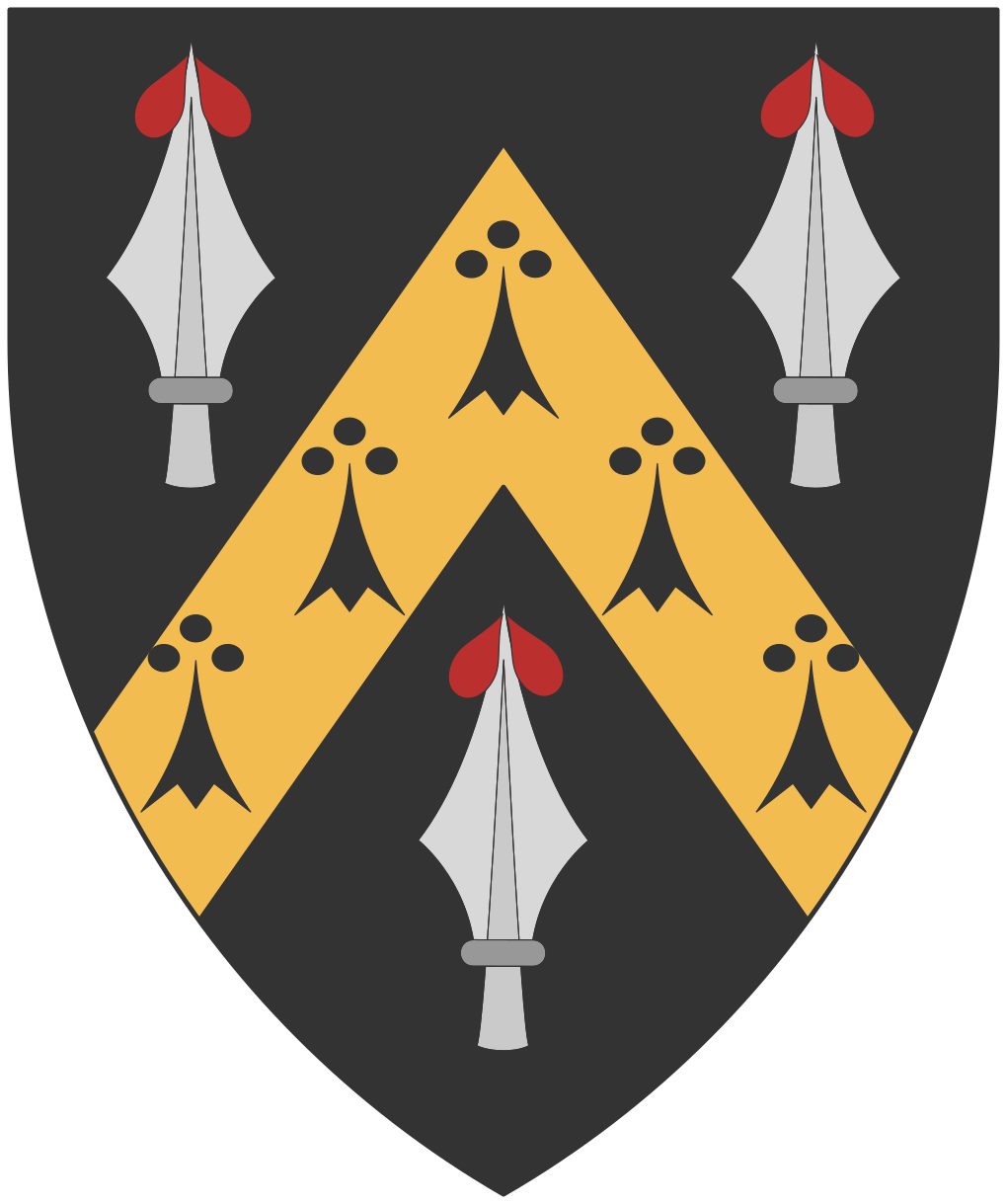
Arms of Price of Jamaica

The Price baronetcy, of Jamaica in the West Indies, was created in the Baronetage of Great Britain on 13 August 1768 for Charles Price, Speaker of the House of Assembly of Jamaica. He was the son of the plantation owner Col. Charles Price and his wife Sarah Edmunds, and grandson of Francis Price, who settled in Jamaica in the 1650s.

The 2nd Baronet also served as Speaker of the House of Assembly of Jamaica. The title became extinct on his death in 1788.

== Price baronets of Jamaica (1768) ==
- Sir Charles Price, 1st Baronet (1708–1772). He matriculated at Trinity College, Oxford in 1724. He owned a number of sugar plantations in Jamaica.
- Sir Charles Price, 2nd Baronet (c. 1733–1788). He matriculated at Trinity College, Oxford in 1752. He inherited his father's estates, and followed in his political footsteps.

== Notes ==
Baronetage of Great Britain
Preceded by Burnaby baronets	Price baronets of Jamaica; 13 August 1768	Succeeded by Burrard baronets
