= Bernard baronets of Nettleham (1769) =

The Bernard baronetcy, of Nettleham in the County of Lincoln, was created in the Baronetage of Great Britain on 5 April 1769 for Francis Bernard. He was colonial governor of New Jersey and Massachusetts Bay.

His younger son, the 4th Baronet, sat as Member of Parliament for Aylesbury and for St Mawes; and served under William Pitt the Younger as Under-Secretary of State for the Home Department. In 1789 he assumed by Royal licence the additional surname of Tyringham and in 1811 the surname of Morland in lieu of Tyringham. The 6th Baronet, also represented Aylesbury in the House of Commons. On his death in 1883 without surviving male issue, the baronetcy became extinct.

== Bernard baronets, of Nettleham (1769) ==
- Sir Francis Bernard, 1st Baronet (c. 1712–1779)
- Sir John Bernard, 2nd Baronet (c. 1746–1809)
- Sir Thomas Bernard, 3rd Baronet (1750–1818)
- Sir Scrope Bernard-Morland, 4th Baronet (1758–1830)
- Sir Francis Bernard-Morland, 5th Baronet (1790–1876)
- Sir Thomas Tyringham Bernard, 6th Baronet (1791–1883)

== Notes ==
Baronetage of Great Britain
Preceded by Hume baronets	Bernard baronets of Nettleham; 5 April 1769	Succeeded by Alleyne baronets
