= Edward Morant (cricketer, born 1772) =

English cricketer

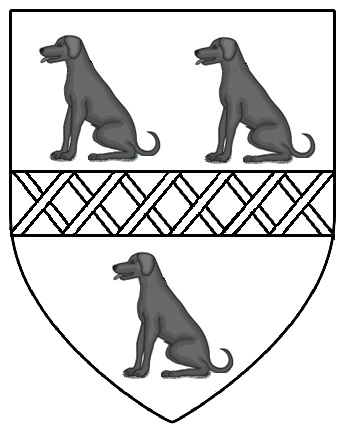
Coat of arms Morant

Edward Gregory Morant Gale (1772–1855) was an English amateur cricketer who made three known appearances between 1793 and 1795. He was a noted patron of the game who organised a number of matches in the 1790s and was a plantation owner in the British West Indies.

== Biography ==
Morant was born in 1772, the son of Edward Morant, a Member of Parliament, and his second wife Mary Whitehorne Goddard, daughter of James Goddard of Conduit Street, London. His family had owned a number of slave plantations producing sugar in Jamaica for generations, and Morant inherited the estates belonging to his aunt Elizabeth Morant and her husband William Gale who died in 1784, as well as those of his father who died in 1791. He assumed the name Gale as part of the terms of his inheritance from his aunt.

Morant served as ensign in the 1st Regiment of Foot Guards from 1791.

As a cricketer, Morant played mainly for Marylebone Cricket Club and for Berkshire. He made his debut for R. Leigh's XI at Burley-on-the Hill in August 1792 and his last for Berkshire against Middlesex at Lord's Old Ground in July 1795. He batted in six innings, was not out in three of them, and scored a total of 13 runs. He never bowled but took one wicket by stumping and another with a catch.

Morant lived at Upham near Bishop's Waltham in Hampshire. He married twice: his first wife was Elizabeth Townsend whom he married in 1798, and his second wife was Emily Jane Gambier. His daughter Louisa married William Skipwith, son of Sir Grey Skipwith, 8th Baronet in 1843. His son Edward John Morant Gale was also a cricketer, and married Maria Henrietta, second daughter of Sir Simeon Stuart in 1845.

Morant died at Upham in August 1855. At his death most of his properties in Jamaica, where slavery had been abolished in 1838, were heavily mortgaged, with only one passing to his wife and son.
