= Jones-Brydges baronets =

Extinct baronetcy in the Baronetage of the United Kingdom

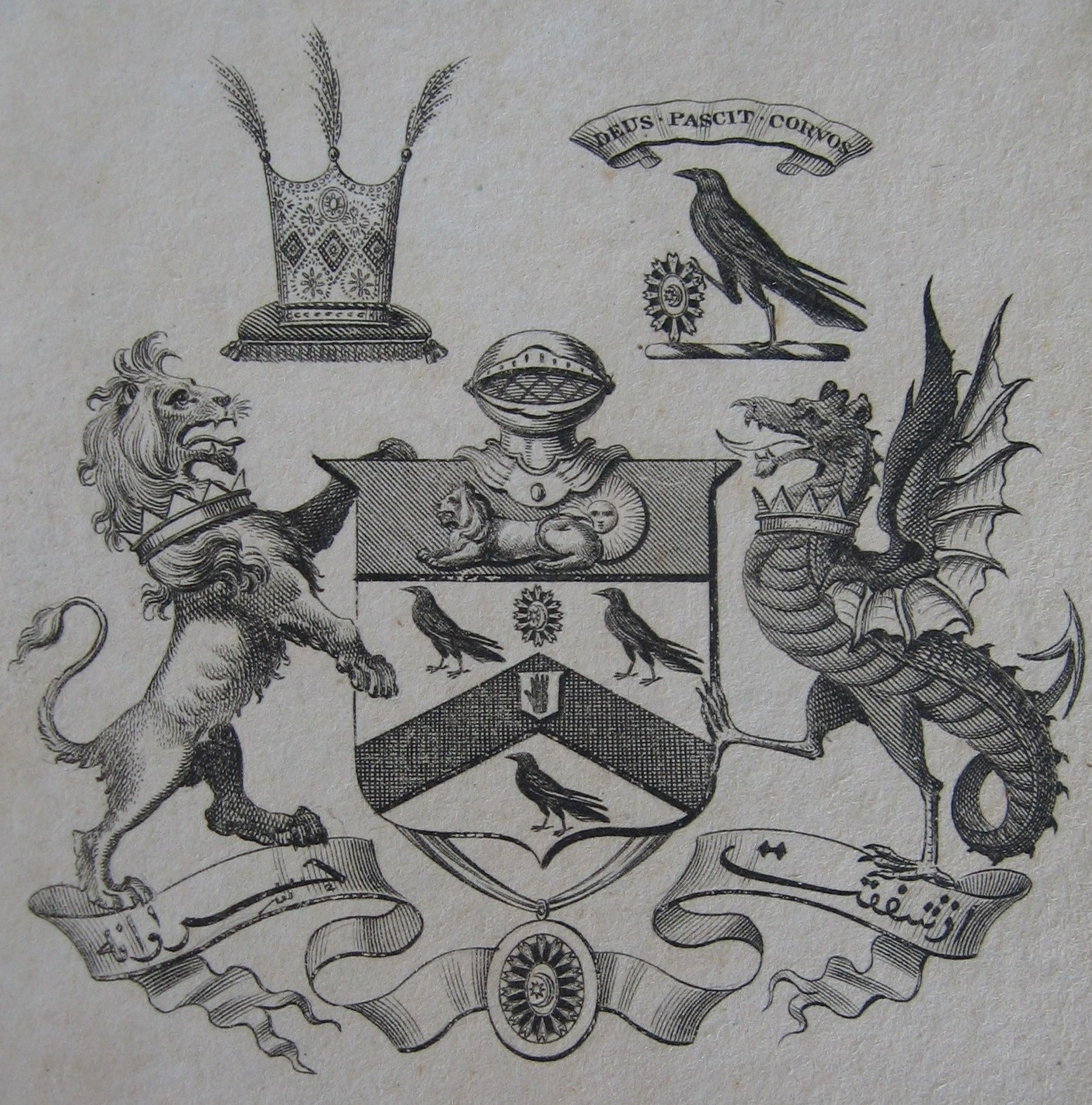
Coat of arms of Sir Harford Jones-Brydges, 1st Baronet

The Jones, later Jones-Brydges Baronetcy, of Boultibrook in the County of Radnorshire, was a title in the Baronetage of the United Kingdom. It was created on 9 October 1807 for Harford Jones, Envoy Extraordinary and Minister Plenipotentiary to Persia from 1807 to 1811. He later assumed the additional surname of Brydges. The title became extinct on the death of the second Baronet in 1891.

== Jones, later Jones-Brydges baronets, of Boultibrook (1807) ==
- Sir Harford Jones-Brydges, 1st Baronet (1764–1847)
- Sir Harford James Jones-Brydges, 2nd Baronet (1808–1891)

Coat of arms of Jones-Brydges of Boultibrook
Crest Crest 1: two wings addorsed, argent, charged with a bend, engrailed, sable (BRYDGES); Crest 2: on a cushion, gules, garnished and tasseled, or, a representation of the royal crown of Persia (JONES); Crest 3: a crow, sable, rating the dexter claw on the star of the Order of the Crescent Escutcheon Quarterly : 1st & 4th, argent, a chief, pules; over all a bend engrailed, sable, charged on the chief point with a chaplet, or (BRYDGES); 2nd & 3rd. argent, a chevron, between three crows, sable; in chief the star of the Order of the Crescent; on a chief of augmentation, vert, a lion couchant in front of the sun in splendour, proper, being the royal arms of Persia, granted to the 1st Baronet by Patch Ali Shall, King of Persia, and conferred, by royal warrant in 1810, (JONES). Supporters Dexter, a lion, proper, gorged with an eastern crown, vert; sinister, a wyvern, vert, gorged with an eastern crown, or; granted by royal warrant in 1810.

Baronetage of the United Kingdom
Preceded by Sibbald baronets	Jones-Brydges baronets of Boultibrook; 9 October 1807	Succeeded by Burrard baronets
