= Hume baronets of Wormleybury (1769) =

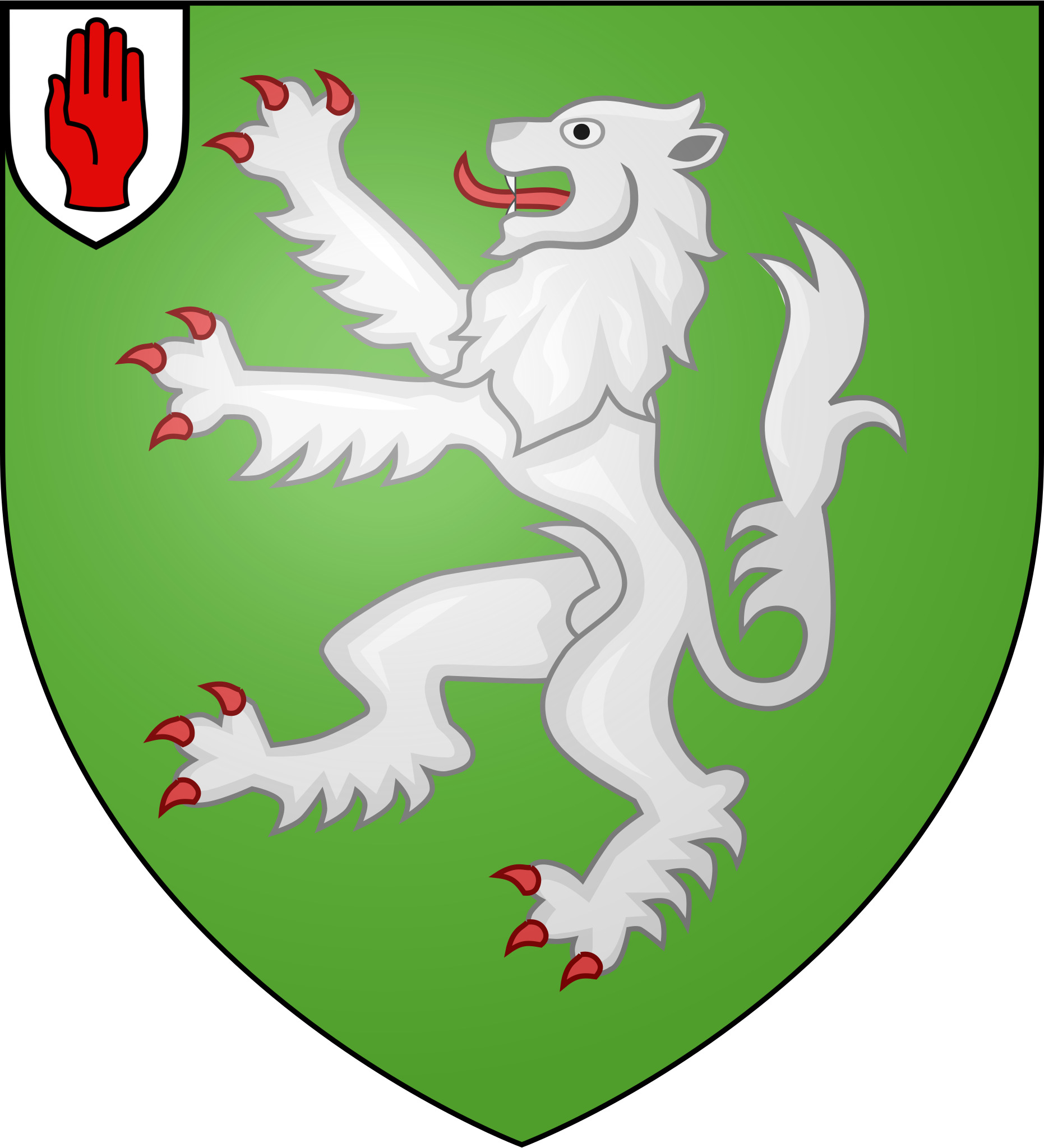
Arms of Hume of Wormleybury

The Hume baronetcy, of Wormleybury in the County of Hertford, was created in the Baronetage of Great Britain on 4 April 1769 for Abraham Hume, Member of Parliament for Steyning and Tregony. He was a government contractor.

He was succeeded by his son, the 2nd Baronet, a Member of Parliament and founder of the Geological Society. The title became extinct on his death in 1838.

== Hume baronets, of Wormleybury (1769) ==
- Sir Abraham Hume, 1st Baronet (c. 1703–1772)
- Sir Abraham Hume, 2nd Baronet (1749–1838)

== Notes ==
Baronetage of Great Britain
Preceded by Burrard baronets	Hume baronets of Wormleybury; 4 April 1769	Succeeded by Bernard baronets
