= Governor of Calshot Castle =

The Governor of Calshot Castle was a military officer who commanded the fortifications at Calshot Castle, a Device Fort of Henry VIII guarding Southampton Water. It was in military use until 1956.

== Governors of Calshot Castle ==
- Capt. Richard Smith
- 1650s: Thomas Bettesworth
- 1660–1661: Francis Burghill
- 1661–1672: Lord Henry Paulet
- 1673–1689: James Halsall
- 1689–1693: Francis Paulet
- 1693–aft. 1756: William Knapton
- 1761–1787: Sir Harry Burrard, 1st Baronet, of Walhampton
- 1787–1813: Sir Harry Burrard, 1st Baronet, of Lymington
- 1813–1837: Richard Lambart, 7th Earl of Cavan
- office abolished
