= Walter Boyd (financier) =

British financier (c.1754–1837)

Walter Boyd (c.1754–1837) was a British financier.

== Life ==
Boyd was born in obscure circumstances in Scotland about 1754. Before the outbreak of the French Revolution he was a banker in Paris. The progress of events soon caused him to flee, and the property of the firm of Boyd, Ker, & Co., of which he was the chief member, was confiscated in October 1793. In March 1793 the firm of Boyd, Benfield, & Co. was established in London. Boyd, as the principal partner, contributed £60,000 to the common stock. From 1793 to 1799, the firm was the leading government loan contractor in Britain.

He was a supporter of William Pitt the Younger, and enjoyed his confidence. He was employed in contracting to the amount of over £30 million for large government loans, and for some time was very prosperous. He was also M.P. for Shaftesbury (1796–1802), which at the period of his election was a pocket borough of his partner Paul Benfield, who was returned along with him .

After a few years the firm got into difficulties. It had at one time seemed likely that the property seized at Paris would be restored, but the revolution of 4 September 1797 caused the overthrow of the government which had taken preliminary steps towards restitution, and the final confiscation of the property followed. In expectation of a different issue, Boyd, Benfield, & Co. had entered into arrangements which soon resulted in disaster. They obtained private help, and even assistance from government, but in 1799 the affairs of the company were put into liquidation, and Boyd found himself ruined.

He visited France in the brief interval of the Peace of Amiens (March 1802 – May 1803), was one of those detained, and was not released till the fall of Napoleon in 1814. On his return to England he was able to recover something of his former prosperity, and sat as M.P. for Lymington from April 1823 to 1830. Walter Scott met him in April 1828, and gives an account, though not accurate, of his remarkable self-sacrifice on behalf of his creditors.

Boyd died at Plaistow Lodge, Kent, on 16 September 1837.

== Works ==
Boyd wrote pamphlets on financial subjects. They were:

- Letter to the Right Honourable William Pitt on the Influence of the Stoppage of Issues in Specie at the Bank of England on the Prices of Provisions and other Commodities (London, 1801, 2nd ed. 1811). This was called forth by a pamphlet on the effects of the suspension of cash payments in 1797, and was intended to prove "that the increase of banknotes is the principal cause of the great rise in the price of commodities and every species of exchangeable value" (p. 7). These conclusions were attacked by Sir Francis Baring in his Observations (1801), and other writers, including Thomas Skinner Surr.
- Reflections on the Financial System of Great Britain, and particularly on the Sinking Fund (1815, 2nd ed. 1828). This was written in captivity in France in 1812. It discusses the benefits of a sinking fund as a means of clearing off national debt, and explains various schemes for its application.
- Observations on Lord Grenville's Essay on the Sinking Fund (London, 1828), a reply to a treatise published the same year.

Parliament of the United Kingdom
Preceded by Paul Benfield; Charles Duncombe	Member of Parliament for Shaftesbury; 1796–1801; With: Paul Benfield	Succeeded by Parliament of the United Kingdom
Parliament of the United Kingdom
Preceded by Parliament of Great Britain	Member of Parliament for Shaftesbury; 1801–1802; With: Paul Benfield	Succeeded by Edward Loveden; Robert Hurst
Preceded by William Manning; Sir Harry Burrard-Neale, Bt	Member of Parliament for Lymington; 1823–1830; With: William Manning to 1826; Guy Lenox Prendergast 1826–27; Thomas Divett 1827–28; George Burrard from 1828	Succeeded by George Burrard; William Egerton
