= Burnaby baronets =

- Escutcheon of the Burnaby Baronets of Broughton Hall
- Creation date: 1767
- Status: extinct
- Motto: Pro rege, For the king

The Burnaby Baronetcy, of Broughton Hall in the County of Oxford, was a title in the Baronetage of Great Britain. It was created on 31 October 1767 for Vice-Admiral Sir William Burnaby, High Sheriff of Oxfordshire in 1756. He was the son of John Burnaby, Ambassador to Sweden.

The title is extinct. The fifth and last Baronet is believed to have died in Spain.

== Burnaby baronets, of Broughton Hall (1767) ==
- Sir William Burnaby, 1st Baronet (c. 1710 – c. 1777)
- Sir William Chaloner Burnaby RN, 2nd Baronet (1746–1794)
- Sir William Crisp Hood Burnaby, 3rd Baronet (c. 1788–1853)
- Sir William Edward Burnaby, 4th Baronet (1824–1881)
- Sir Henry Burnaby, 5th Baronet (1829–by 1914?). The Westminster Gazette for 27 February 1914 noted that he had not assumed the title, and that the recent Official Roll of the Baronetage regarded him as missing. The following year, the Roll declared that the baronetcy had become extinct in 1894.

Baronetage of Great Britain
Preceded by Denis baronets	Burnaby baronets of Broughton Hall; 31 October 1767	Succeeded by Price baronets
