= Sir George Burrard, 3rd Baronet =

Sir George Burrard, 3rd Baronet GCB GCMG (6 April 1769 – 17 May 1856) was a Church of England priest.

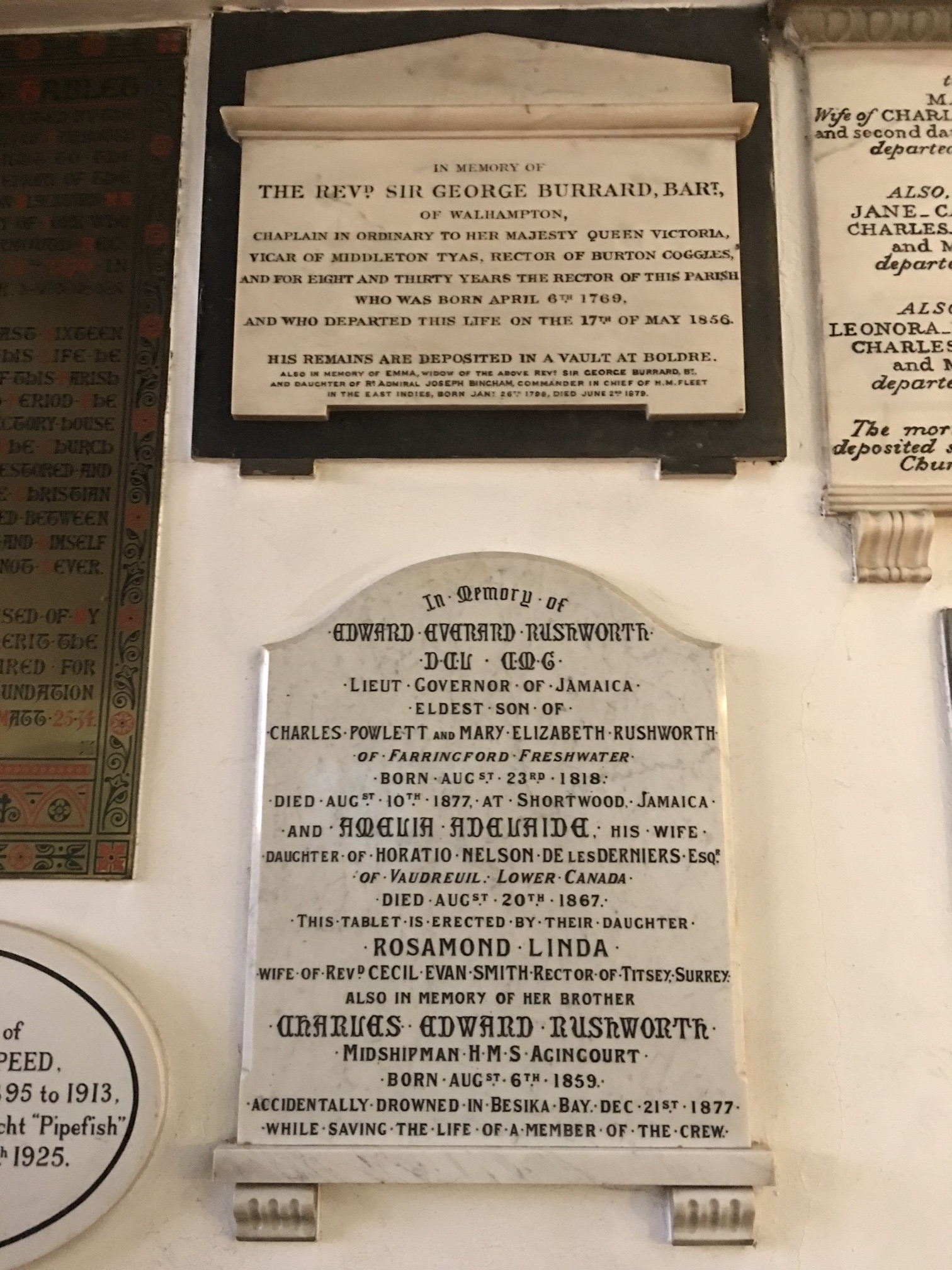
Memorial to Sir George Burrard, 3rd Baronet in St James' Church, Yarmouth, Isle of Wight

He was the second son of William Burrard and nephew of Sir Harry Burrard, 1st Baronet, of Walhampton and succeeded his brother as baronet in 1840. He was Chaplain in Ordinary to Queen Victoria for 38 years.

== Arms ==
Coat of arms of Sir George Burrard, 3rd Baronet

Notes
Granted by the College of Arms on 31st October 1815.
Crest
A naval crown Or therefrom issuant a cubit arm erect Proper charged with a cross patée Gules the hand grasping a trident in bend sinister the points downwards Gules.
Escutcheon
Azure a lion passant between two estoiles in chief and a cross crosslet fitchée in base Argent on a chief Or two lions rampant respecting each other supporting a sinister hand couped Gules.
Motto
Persevere

Baronetage of Great Britain
| Preceded by Harry Burrard-Neale | Baronet (of Walhampton); 1840–1856 | Succeeded by George Burrard |
