= Henry Goodricke (1741–1784) =

English politician

Henry Goodricke (6 April 1741 – 9 July 1784) was an English politician who sat in the House of Commons from 1778 to 1780.

Goodricke was the only son of Sir John Goodricke, 5th Baronet and his wife Mary Benson, illegitimate daughter of Robert Benson, 1st Baron Bingley. His father was a diplomat and he was born at Boulogne on 6 April 1741. He married Levina Benjamina Sessler, daughter of Peter Sessler of Namur on 31 January 1761.

Goodricke was elected unopposed as Member of Parliament (MP) for Lymington on the Burrard interest at a by-election on 4 December 1778. He left the House of Commons at the 1780 general election.

Goodricke died on 9 July 1784. He had three sons and four daughters, not all of whom survived him. His son Henry succeeded to the baronetcy on the death of the 5th Baronet.

Parliament of Great Britain
| Preceded by Edward Morant; Harry Burrard | Member of Parliament for Lymington; 1778 – 1780; With: Edward Morant | Succeeded by Thomas Dummer; Harry Burrard |
