= Sir George Burrard, 4th Baronet =

British politician

Sir George Burrard, 4th Baronet (13 October 1805 – 7 September 1870) was a British politician.

He was the only son of Sir George Burrard, 3rd Baronet and his first wife Elizabeth Anne Coppell, daughter of William Coppell. In 1856, he succeeded his father as baronet. Burrard was Member of Parliament (MP) for Lymington from 1828 to 1832.

On 3 January 1830, he married Isabella Duckett, the only daughter of Sir George Duckett, 2nd Baronet. Their marriage was childless. Burrard drowned, aged 65, while bathing in Lyme Regis and was succeeded in the baronetcy by his younger half-brother Harry.

Parliament of the United Kingdom
Preceded by Thomas Divett; Walter Boyd	Member of Parliament for Lymington; 1828–1832; With: Walter Boyd 1828–1830; William Tatton Egerton 1830–1831; William Alexander Mackinnon 1831–1832	Succeeded by Sir Harry Burrard-Neale; John Stewart
Baronetage of Great Britain
Preceded by George Burrard	Baronet (of Walhampton); 1856–1870	Succeeded by Harry Burrard
