= Walhampton =

Hamlet in Hampshire, England

Coordinates: 50°45′39″N 1°31′51″W

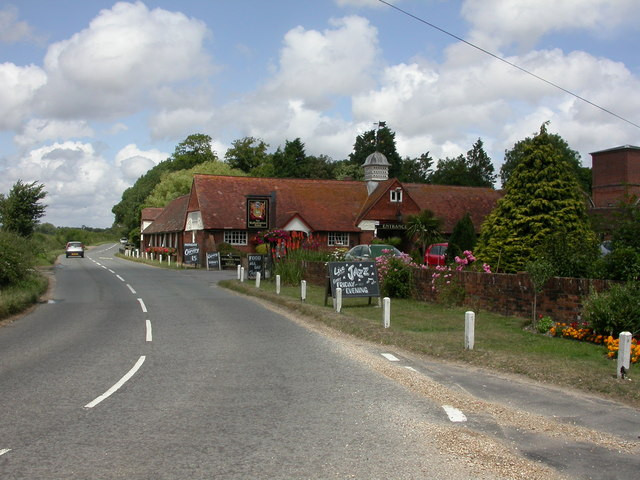
- The Walhampton Arms pub in the hamlet

- Location within Hampshire
- OS grid reference: SZ332958
- Civil parish: Boldre
- District: New Forest
- Shire county: Hampshire
- Region: South East
- Country: England
- Sovereign state: United Kingdom
- Post town: LYMINGTON
- Postcode district: SO41 5
- Dialling code: 01590
- UK Parliament: New Forest West

Walhampton is a hamlet in the New Forest National Park of Hampshire, England. It is in the civil parish of Boldre. It is approximately half a mile east of Lymington, on the east bank of the Lymington River. The Solent Way, a long-distance footpath, passes close to the hamlet.

The Grade II* Burrard Monument, also known as the Walhampton Monument, is located in the hamlet. It was erected in 1840 to the memory of Sir Harry Burrard-Neale, 2nd Baronet, a former Royal Navy Admiral and M.P. for Lymington from 1790 to 1832. The base of the 75-foot (23 m) tapered obelisk is designed to look like an Egyptian doorway.

Walhampton has an independent prep school, the Walhampton School, which was founded after World War II. The school is housed in Walhampton House, a Grade-II*-listed building. A pub, the Walhampton Arms, is housed in the former dairy on the estate, listed at Grade II.
