= Sir Harry Burrard, 1st Baronet, of Walhampton =

British politician (1707–1791)

Sir Harry Burrard, 1st Baronet (1707 – 12 April 1791) was a British politician who sat in the House of Commons for 37 years from 1741 to 1778.

== Early life ==
Burrard was the eldest son of Paul Burrard MP, of Walhampton, and his wife Lucy Dutton-Colt, daughter of Sir Thomas Dutton-Colt, Envoy to the Courts of Hanover and Dresden. In 1728, Burrard was appointed Gentleman Usher to Frederick, Prince of Wales and in 1731 was appointed as a Collector of the Customs of London. In 1738, Burrard succeeded his father to Walhampton Manor.

== Political career ==
The Burrard family had a strong interest in the port town of Lymington, which usually enabled them to fill both of its seats in Parliament. Burrard's father and grandfather both represented the borough in Parliament. At the 1761 he was returned as Member of Parliament for the Lymington constituency and retained the seat until 1778. He was appointed riding forester of the New Forest in 1754 and Governor of Calshot Castle in 1761. On 3 April 1769, he was made a baronet, of Walhampton in the County of Southampton, with a special remainder to his brothers.

== Family ==
In 1731, Burrard married firstly Alicia Snape, daughter of Francis° Snape, and in 1754, secondly Mary Frances Clarke, daughter of James Clarke. He had a daughter and four sons by his first wife and a daughter and a son by his second wife. His sons died all before him, so he was succeeded in his baronetcy by Harry Burrard-Neale, the oldest son of his younger brother.

== Notes ==
Parliament of Great Britain
Preceded by Sir John Cope; Maurice Bocland	Member of Parliament for Lymington; 1741–1778; With: Lord Nassau Powlett 1741; Sir Charles Powlett 1741–1754; Lord Harry Powlett 1755–1761; Adam Drummond 1761–1769; Hugo Meynell 1769–1774; Edward Morant 1774–1778	Succeeded by Edward Morant; Henry Goodricke
Military offices
Preceded by William Knapton?	Governor of Calshot Castle; 1761–1787	Succeeded by Sir Harry Burrard
Baronetage of Great Britain
New creation	Baronet (of Walhampton); 1769–1791	Succeeded by Harry Burrard-Neale
