= Sir William Burnaby, 1st Baronet =

British naval officer (18th century)

Rear-Admiral Sir William Burnaby Bt
- Born: ca. 1710
- Died: 1776
- Military career
- Allegiance: Kingdom of Great Britain
- Branch: Royal Navy
- Rank: Rear-Admiral
- Commands: HMS Thunder; HMS Lichfield; HMS Jersey; HMS Royal Anne; Jamaica Station

Sir William Burnaby, 1st Baronet (c. 1710 – 1776) was a British naval officer who became Commander-in-Chief, Jamaica Station.

== Naval career ==
Burnaby was the son of John Burnaby of Kensington. He entered the navy and was promoted to lieutenant in 1732. In August 1741 he was given command of the bomb-ketch HMS Thunder and posted to Admiral Vernon's squadron in the West Indies. In 1742 he became captain of the fourth-rate HMS Lichfield.

On his return to England he bought Broughton Hall in Oxfordshire in 1747, was knighted in 1754 and served as High Sheriff of Oxfordshire for 1755.

On the outbreak of war with France he was given command of the fourth-rate HMS Jersey and then the first-rate HMS Royal Anne and in 1762 promoted to rear-admiral. In 1763 he was back in the West Indies in command of the fourth-rate HMS Dreadnought with orders to protect and exploit local trade. He was appointed Commander-in-Chief, Leeward Islands Station in 1763 and Commander-in-Chief, Jamaica Station in 1764. In 1765 he sailed to Belize at the request of the loggers there to protect them from Spanish attacks, drawing up a Civil Law for the colony called Burnaby's Code, which some claim to be the world's first constitution and that has been signed by two women. He returned to England in 1767 and on 31 October 1767 was created a baronet. He was promoted to Vice-admiral of the White on 20 October 1770 and to Vice-admiral of the Red soon afterward.

He died in 1776, and was succeeded by his son Sir William Chaloner Burnaby. He had married twice: firstly Margaret, widow of Tim Donovan of Jamaica (they had the son, William Chaloner, and a daughter, Elizabeth) and secondly Grace, daughter of Drewry Ottley with whom he had six children, including Edward, who followed his father into the Royal Navy. His daughter Charlotte married the MP Josias Porcher.

His six times great-grandson is actor Daniel Craig.

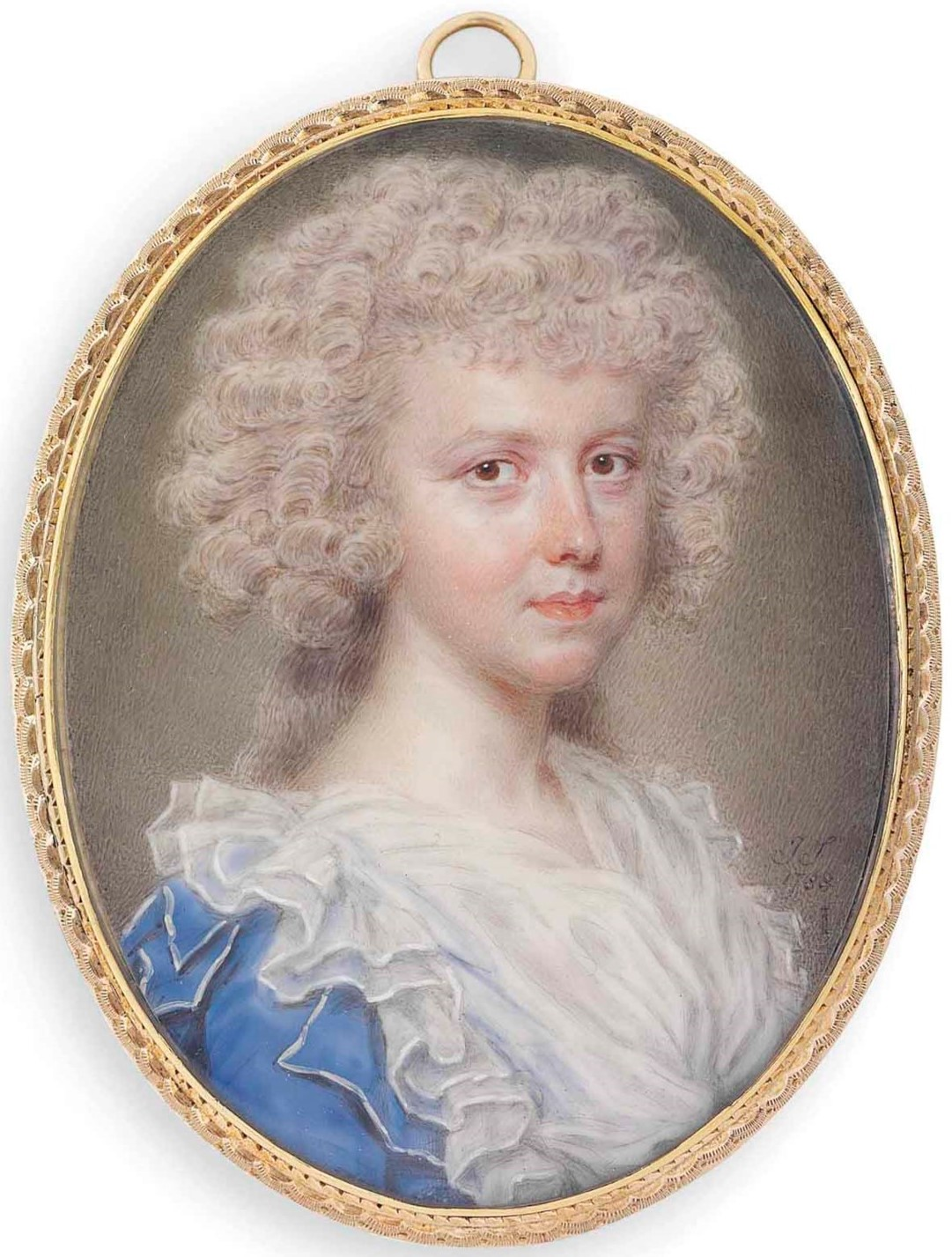
Charlotte Burnaby (daughter)

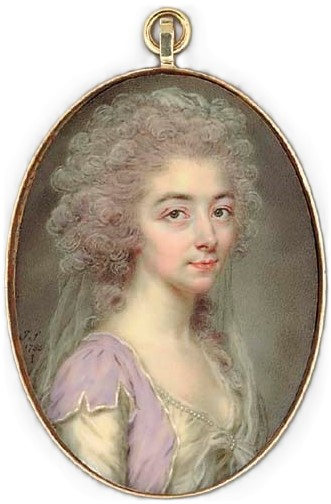
Georgiana Grace Burnaby (daughter)

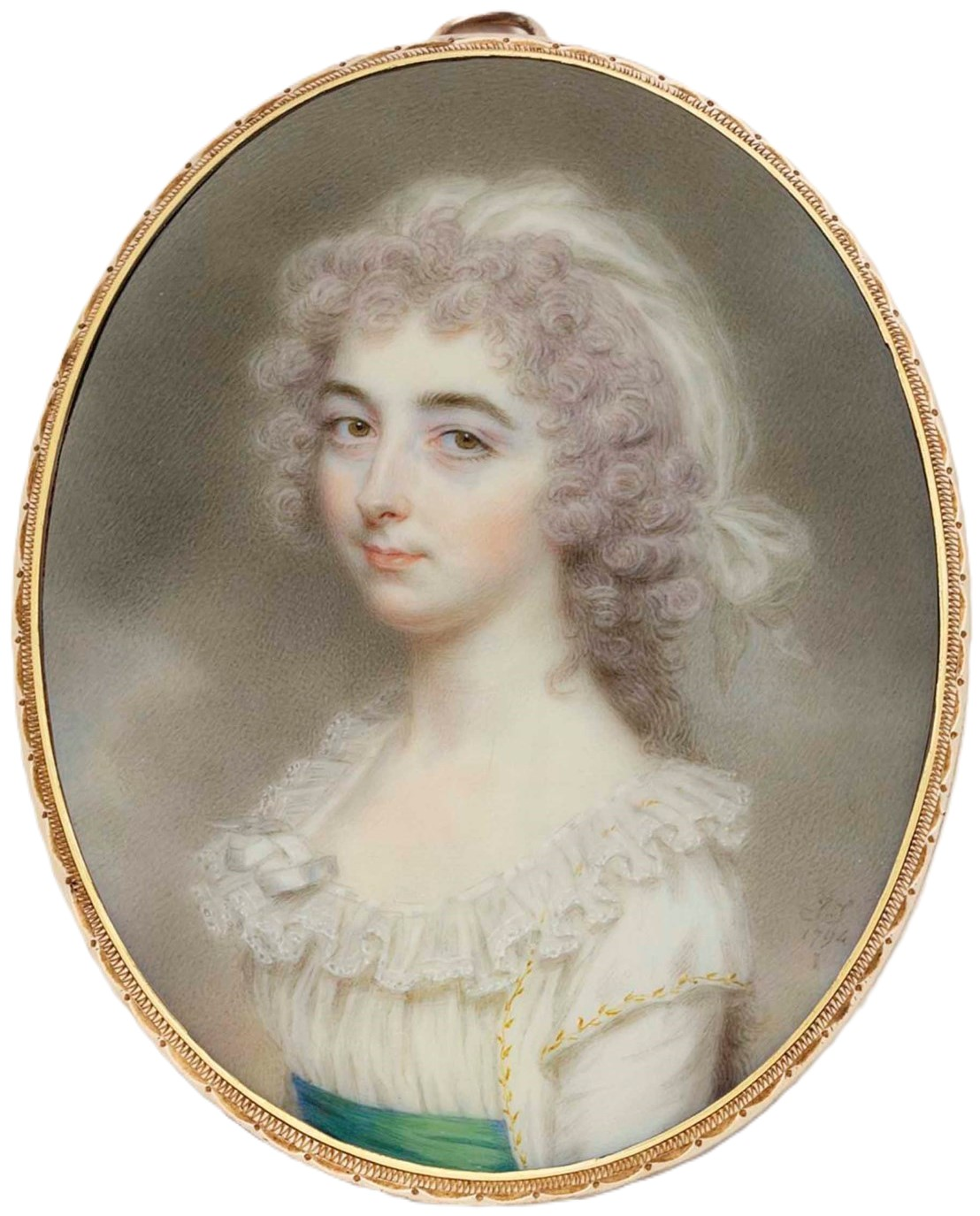
Harriet Emma Burnaby (daughter)

== Sources ==
- Cundall, Frank (1915). Historic Jamaica. West India Committee.

Military offices
Preceded by George Brydges Rodney	Commander-in-Chief, Leeward Islands Station; 1763	Succeeded by Robert Swanton
Preceded by Augustus Keppel	Commander-in-Chief, Jamaica Station; 1764–1766	Succeeded by William Parry
Baronetage of Great Britain
New creation	Baronet (of Broughton Hall); 1767–1776	Succeeded by William Chaloner Burnaby
