= Harry Burrard Neale =

Royal Navy officer and politician (1765–1840)

Admiral Sir Harry Burrard Neale Bt GCB GCMG
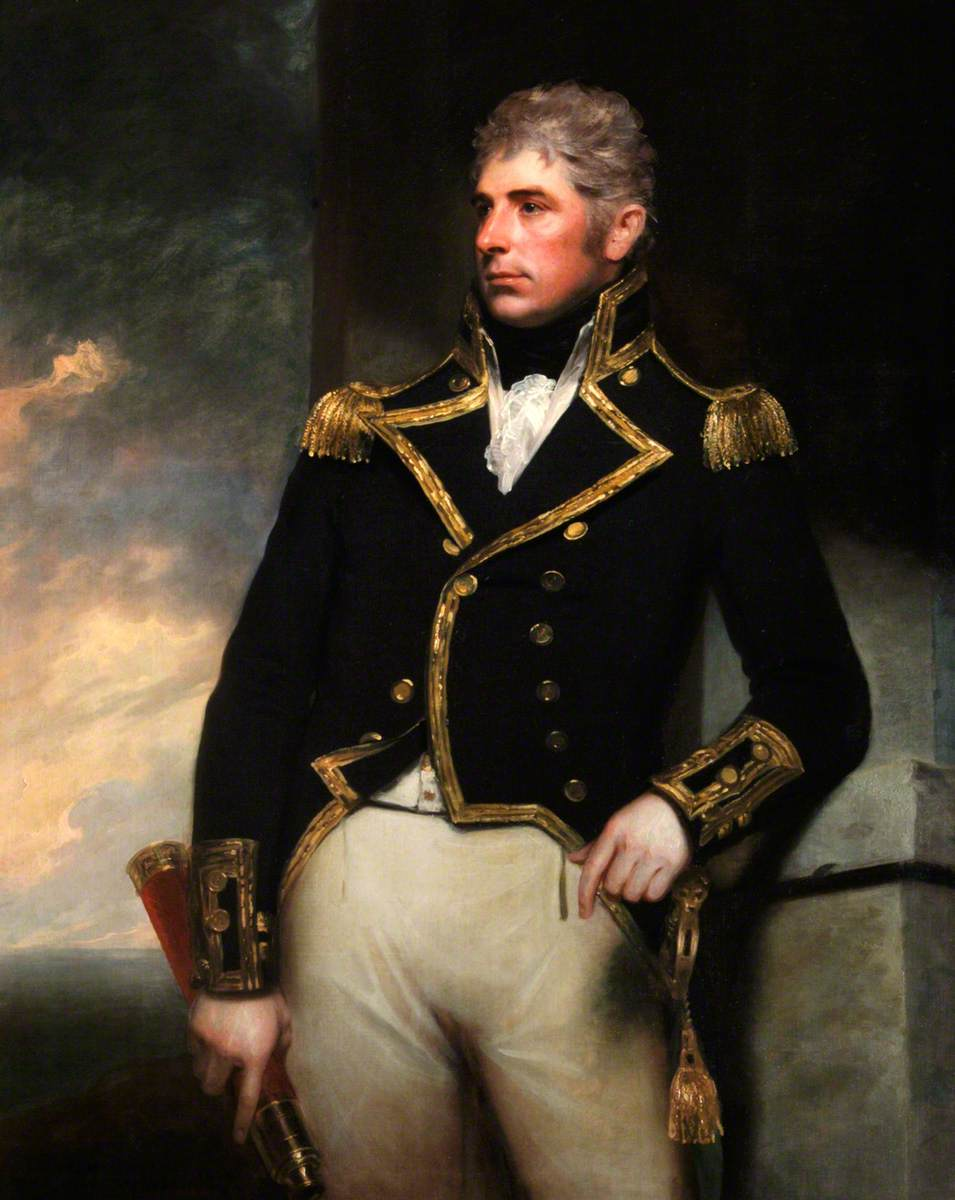
- Portrait by William Beechey, 1822
- Born: 16 September 1765
- Died: 7 February 1840 (aged 74)
- Burial place: Lymington
- Military career
- Allegiance: Great Britain; United Kingdom
- Branch: Royal Navy
- Service years: 1778–1840
- Rank: Admiral
- Commands: Mediterranean Fleet
- Conflicts: American Revolutionary War; Napoleonic Wars
- Awards: Knight Grand Cross of the Order of the Bath; Knight Grand Cross of the Order of St Michael and St George

Admiral Sir Harry Burrard Neale, 2nd Baronet, GCB, GCMG (born Harry Burrard; 16 September 1765 – 7 February 1840) was a Royal Navy officer and politician who represented Lymington in the British House of Commons between 1790 and 1835. He was the son of William Burrard, the governor of Yarmouth Castle on the Isle of Wight, and nephew of Sir Harry Burrard, 1st Baronet, of Walhampton, whom he succeeded in 1791. In 1795, he adopted the additional name of Neale on his marriage to Grace, daughter of Robert Neale of Shaw House, Wiltshire.

== Naval career ==
Educated at Christchurch Grammar School, Burrard joined the Royal Navy in 1778. He was present at the Siege of Charleston in 1780 during the American Revolutionary War.

Burrard distinguished himself during the mutiny at the Nore in 1797. He was one of the Lords of the Admiralty between 1804 and 1807, and was promoted to rear-admiral on 31 July 1810. He was engaged at the action of 13 March 1806 during the Napoleonic Wars aboard HMS London. He was invested as a Knight Commander of the Order of the Bath on 2 January 1815, and advanced to a Knight Grand Cross of that order on 14 September 1822. He became Commander-in-Chief, Mediterranean Fleet in 1823, which led to his appointment as a Knight Grand Cross of the Order of St Michael and St George the following year.

In the summer of 1809 he was called as a witness at the court-martial of James, Lord Gambier which assessed whether Admiral Lord Gambier had failed to support Captain Lord Cochrane at the Battle of the Basque Roads in April 1809. Gambier was controversially cleared of all charges.

== Political career ==
Neale was Member of Parliament for Lymington from 1790 to 1802, 1806 to 1807, 1812 to 1823 and 1832 to 1835. He was a Groom of the Bedchamber to King George III from 1801 to 1812, continuing afterwards at Windsor from 1812 to 1820 during the Regency.

== Personal life ==
Burrard Neale died without issue at age 74 in 1840, and was buried at Lymington parish church. He was succeeded by his brother George.

== Namesakes ==
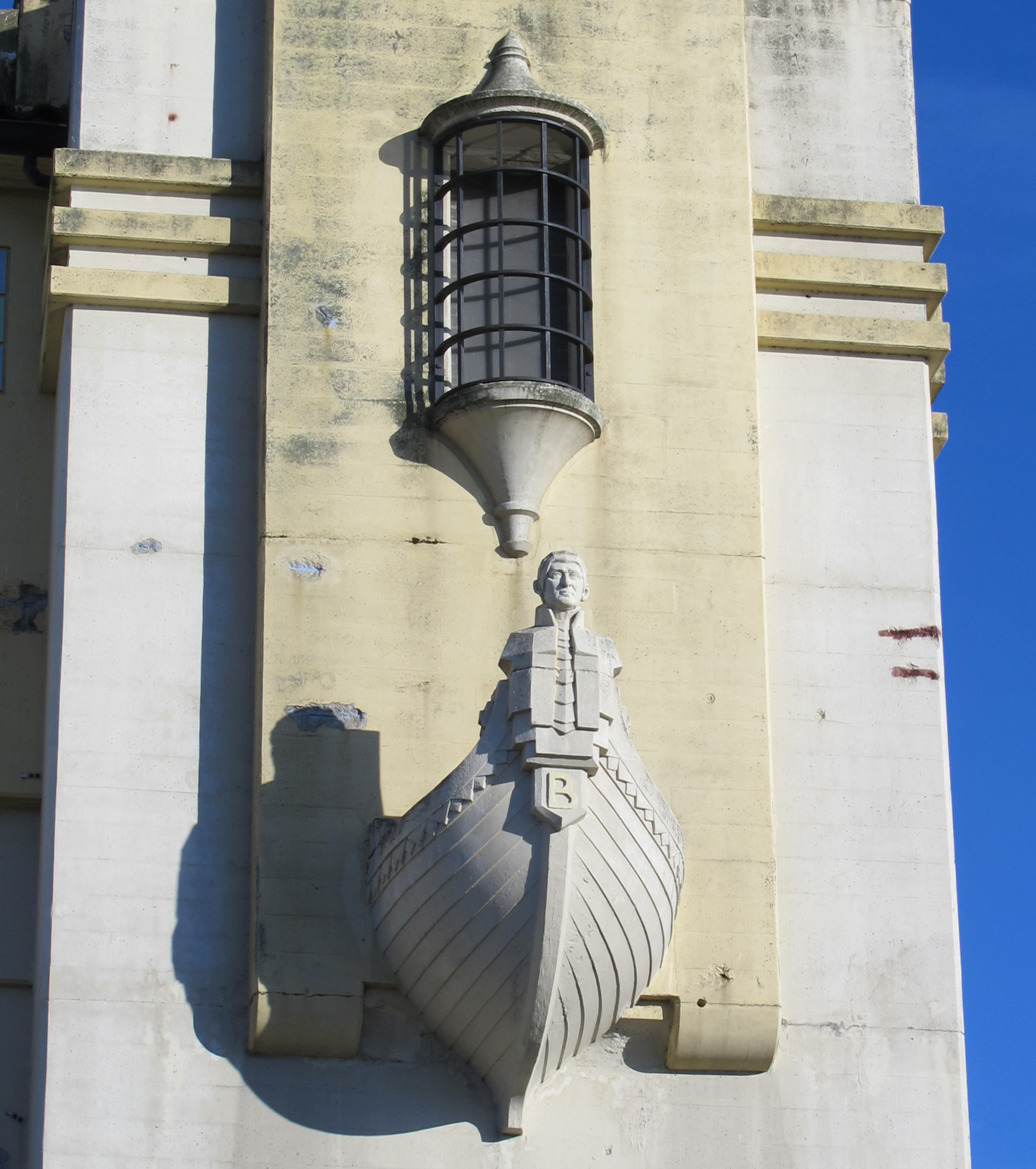
Bust of Burrard by Charles Marega on Burrard Bridge, Vancouver

Burrard Inlet was named in his honour by Captain George Vancouver in June 1792, during his expedition of exploration in the Pacific Northwest. During the later development of the city of Vancouver, a major north–south thoroughfare, Burrard Street, was named for the inlet, which subsequently gave its name to Burrard Bridge, one of the three major bridges that connect downtown Vancouver to its suburbs to the south. The inlet and street have inspired many other building, business and institution names in the Vancouver area, so although Harry Burrard never visited British Columbia his name is commonly found in that area.

Parliament of Great Britain
Preceded by Robert Colt; George Rose	Member of Parliament for Lymington; 1790–1801; With: Harry Burrard 1790–1791; Nathaniel Brassey Halhed 1791–1796; William Manning 1796–1801	Succeeded by Parliament of the United Kingdom
Parliament of the United Kingdom
Preceded by Parliament of Great Britain	Member of Parliament for Lymington; 1801–1802; With: William Manning	Succeeded by William Manning; Harry Burrard
Preceded by William Manning; John Kingston	Member of Parliament for Lymington; 1806–1807; With: John Kingston	Succeeded by George Duckett; John Kingston
Preceded by George Duckett; John Kingston	Member of Parliament for Lymington; 1812–1823; With: John Kingston 1812–1814; John Taylor 1814–1818; William Manning 1818–1820; George Finch 1820–1821; William Manning 1821–1823	Succeeded by William Manning; Walter Boyd
Preceded by William Alexander Mackinnon; George Burrard	Member of Parliament for Lymington; 1832–1835; With: John Stewart	Succeeded by John Stewart; William Alexander Mackinnon
Military offices
Preceded by Sir Graham Moore	Commander-in-Chief, Mediterranean Fleet; 1823–1826	Succeeded by Sir Edward Codrington
Baronetage of Great Britain
Preceded by Harry Burrard	Baronet (of Walhampton); 1791–1840	Succeeded by George Burrard
