= Burrard baronets =

There have been two baronetcies created for members of the Burrard family, one in the Baronetage of Great Britain and one in the Baronetage of the United Kingdom. Both creations are extinct.

- Burrard baronets of Walhampton (1769)
- Burrard baronets of Lymington (1807)
